= Sutkūnai, Kėdainiai =

Sutkūnai
- Village
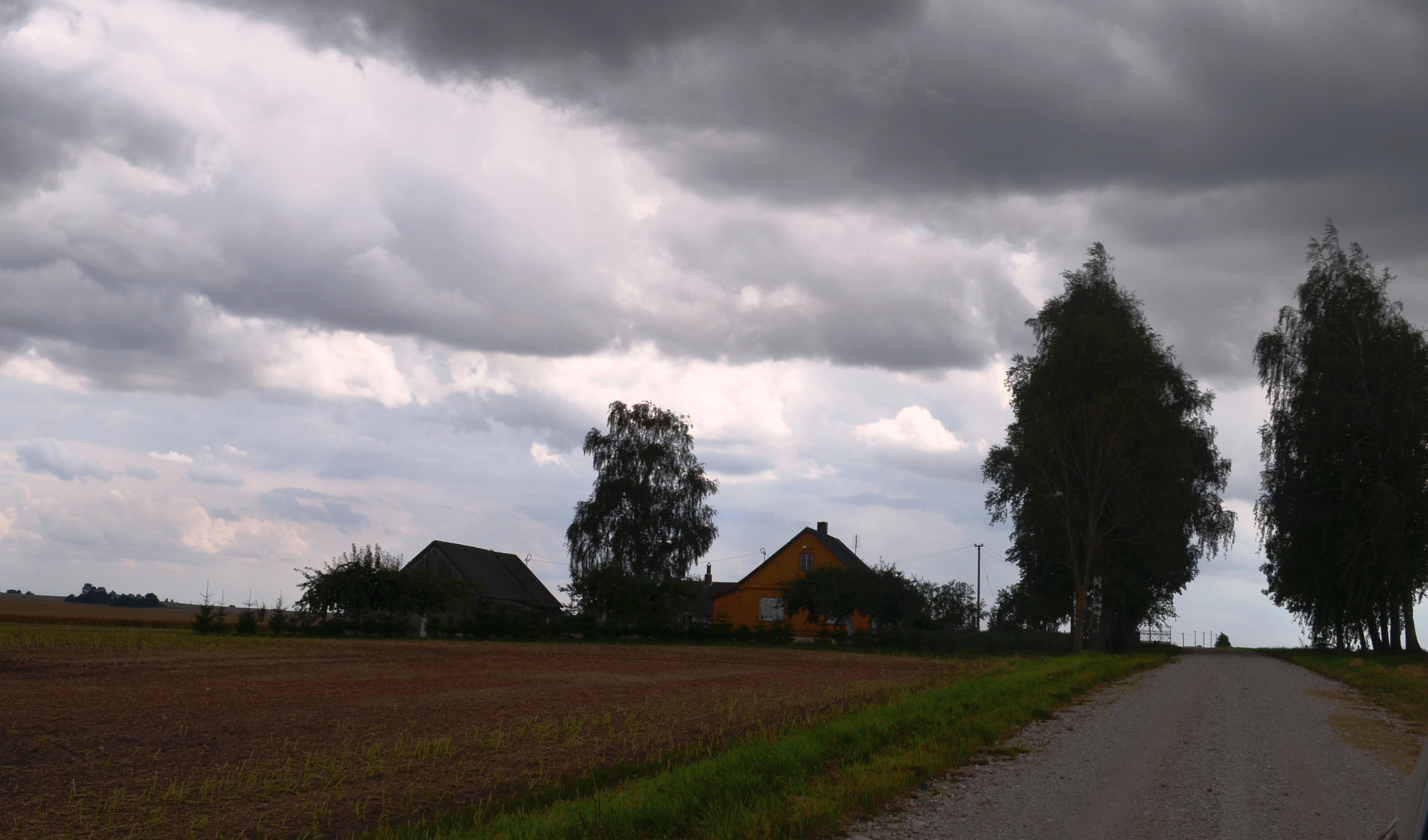

- Location in Lithuania Sutkūnai (Lithuania)
- Coordinates: 55°22′08″N 23°40′08″E
- Country: Lithuania
- County: Kaunas County
- Municipality: Kėdainiai district municipality
- Eldership: Krakės Eldership

Population (2011)
  - Total: 3
- Time zone: UTC+2 (EET)
  - Summer (DST): UTC+3 (EEST)

Sutkūnai (formerly Russian: Суткуны, Polish: Sutkuny) is a village in Kėdainiai district municipality, in Kaunas County, in central Lithuania. According to the 2011 census, the village had a population of 3 people. It is located 2.5 kilometres (1.6 mi) from Pajieslys.

Sutkūnai estate and okolica are mentioned at the end of the 19th century.

== Demography ==
Historical population

Year	Pop.	±% p.a.
1923	32	—
1959	38	+0.48%
1970	34	−1.01%
1979	13	−10.13%

Year	Pop.	±% p.a.
1989	3	−13.64%
2001	4	+2.43%
2011	3	−2.84%

Source: 1902, 1923, 1959 & 1970, 1979, 1989, 2001, 2011
