= Jankūnai, Krakės =

Jankūnai
- Village
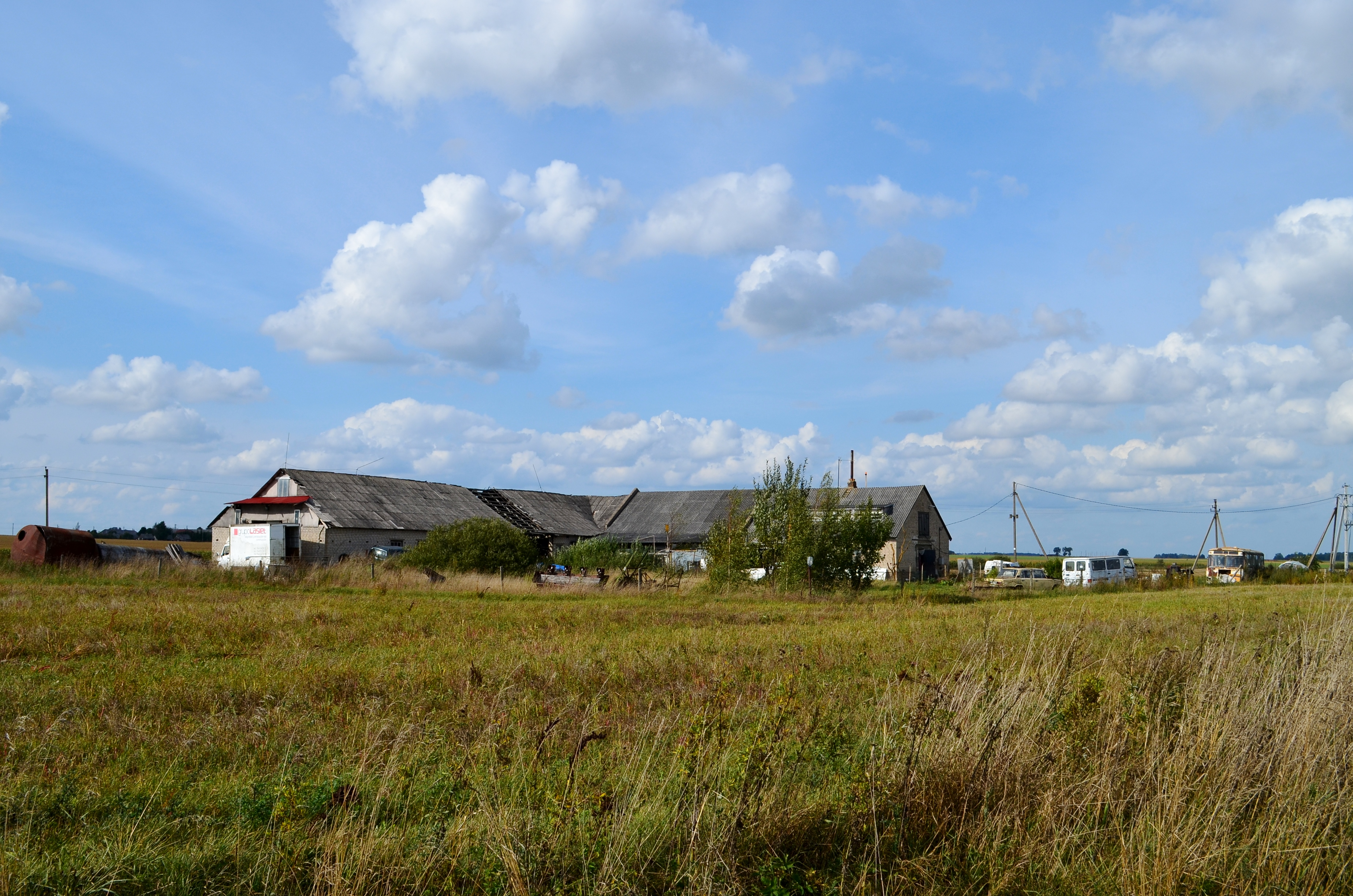

- Location in Lithuania Jankūnai (Lithuania)
- Coordinates: 55°26′49″N 23°45′40″E
- Country: Lithuania
- County: Kaunas County
- Municipality: Kėdainiai district municipality
- Eldership: Krakės Eldership

Population (2011)
  - Total: 6
- Time zone: UTC+2 (EET)
  - Summer (DST): UTC+3 (EEST)

Jankūnai (Polish: Jankuny, Russian: Янкуны) is a village in Kėdainiai district municipality, in Kaunas County, in central Lithuania. According to the 2011 census, the village had a population of 6 people. It is located 2.5 kilometres (1.6 mi) from Mantviliškis, nearby the Krakės-Dotnuva Forest. There is a cemetery.

At the beginning of the 20th century Jankūnai village was a property of the Jaugėlos and Liudkevičiai families.

== Demography ==
Historical population

Year	Pop.	±% p.a.
1902	95	—
1923	80	−0.81%
1959	67	−0.49%
1970	36	−5.49%

Year	Pop.	±% p.a.
1979	11	−12.34%
1989	9	−1.99%
2001	17	+5.44%
2011	6	−9.89%

Source: 1902, 1923, 1959 & 1970, 1979, 1989, 2001, 2011

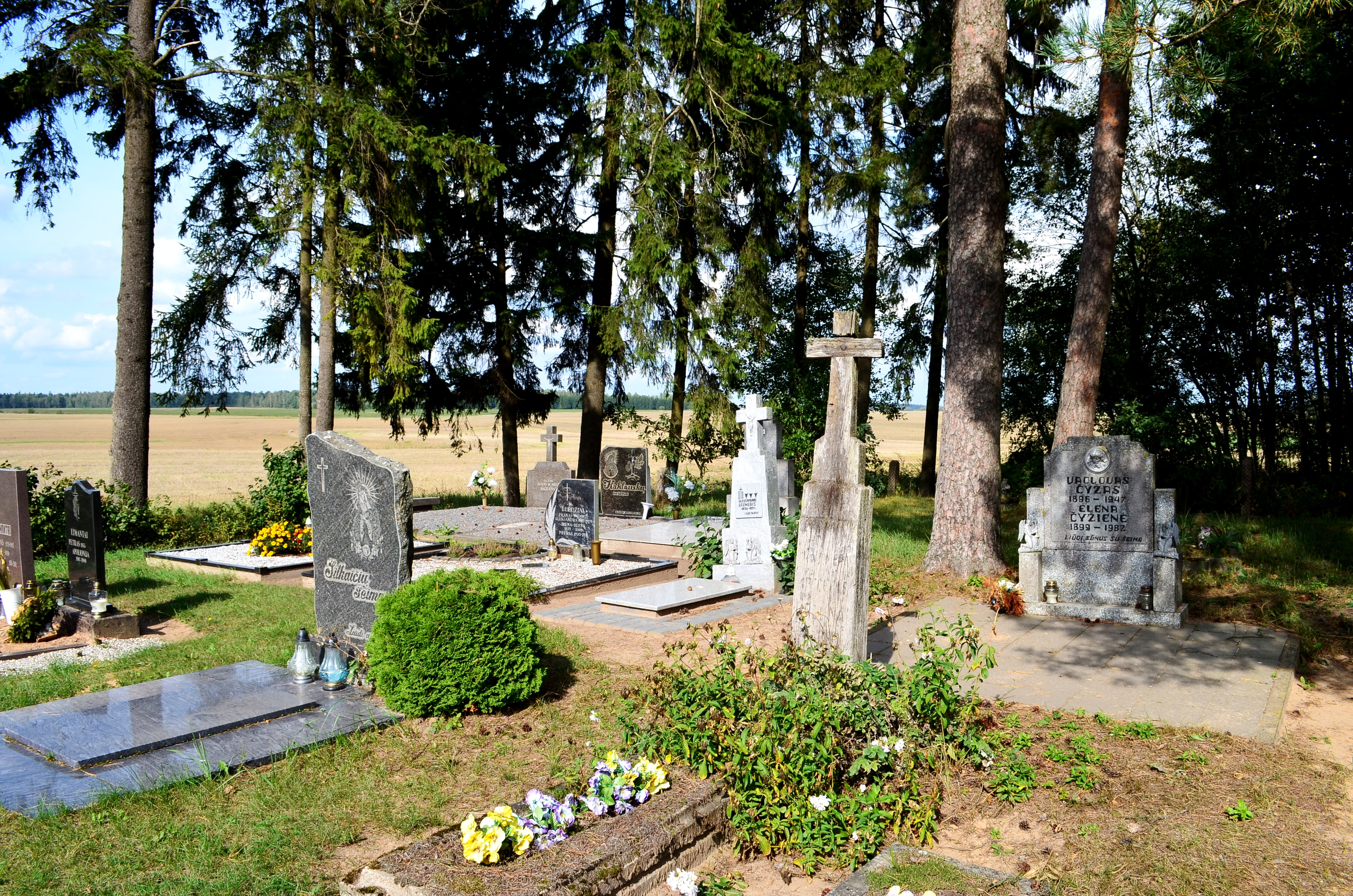
Jankūnai cemetery
