= Barkūnėliai =

- Village
- Location in Lithuania Barkūnėliai (Lithuania)
- Coordinates: 55°26′50″N 23°37′45″E
- Country: Lithuania
- County: Kaunas County
- Municipality: Kėdainiai district municipality
- Eldership: Krakės Eldership

Population (2011)
  - Total: 2
- Time zone: UTC+2 (EET)
  - Summer (DST): UTC+3 (EEST)

Barkūnėliai is a village in Kėdainiai district municipality, in Kaunas County, in central Lithuania. According to the 2011 census, the village had a population of 2 people. It is located 10 kilometres (6.2 mi) from Krakės, 1.5 kilometres (0.93 mi) from Ažytėnai, next to the Slabada Forest.

Historically, it was a folwark.

== Demography ==
Historical population

Year	Pop.	±% p.a.
1923	15	—
1959	21	+0.94%
1970	23	+0.83%
1979	14	−5.37%

Year	Pop.	±% p.a.
1989	4	−11.77%
2001	3	−2.37%
2011	2	−3.97%

Source: 1902, 1923, 1959 & 1970, 1979, 1989, 2001, 2011
