= Donava =

- Village
- Location in Lithuania Donava (Lithuania)
- Coordinates: 55°20′35″N 23°40′20″E
- Country: Lithuania
- County: Kaunas County
- Municipality: Kėdainiai district municipality
- Eldership: Krakės Eldership

Population (2011)
  - Total: 24
- Time zone: UTC+2 (EET)
  - Summer (DST): UTC+3 (EEST)

Donava (formerly Donuva) is a village in Kėdainiai district municipality, in Kaunas County, in central Lithuania. According to the 2011 census, the village had a population of 24 people. It is located on the southeastern limit of Pajieslys village (Toplių street) and de facto is a part of Pajieslys village.

== Demography ==
Historical population

Year	Pop.	±% p.a.
1959	8	—
1970	21	+9.17%
1979	50	+10.12%

Year	Pop.	±% p.a.
1989	42	−1.73%
2001	26	−3.92%
2011	24	−0.80%

Source: 1902, 1923, 1959 & 1970, 1979, 1989, 2001, 2011
