= Maconiai =

- Village
- Location in Lithuania Maconiai (Lithuania)
- Coordinates: 55°21′50″N 23°41′31″E
- Country: Lithuania
- County: Kaunas County
- Municipality: Kėdainiai district municipality
- Eldership: Krakės Eldership

Population (2011)
  - Total: 0
- Time zone: UTC+2 (EET)
  - Summer (DST): UTC+3 (EEST)

Maconiai is a village in Kėdainiai district municipality, in Kaunas County, in central Lithuania. According to the 2011 census, the village was uninhabited. It is located 2 kilometres (1.2 mi) from Pajieslys, on the slope of the ridge.

== Demography ==
Historical population

Year	Pop.	±% p.a.
1959	18	—
1970	16	−1.07%
1979	5	−12.12%

Year	Pop.	±% p.a.
1989	0	−100.00%
2001	1	—
2011	0	−100.00%

Source: 1902, 1923, 1959 & 1970, 1979, 1989, 2001, 2011
