= Žebgraužiai =

- Village
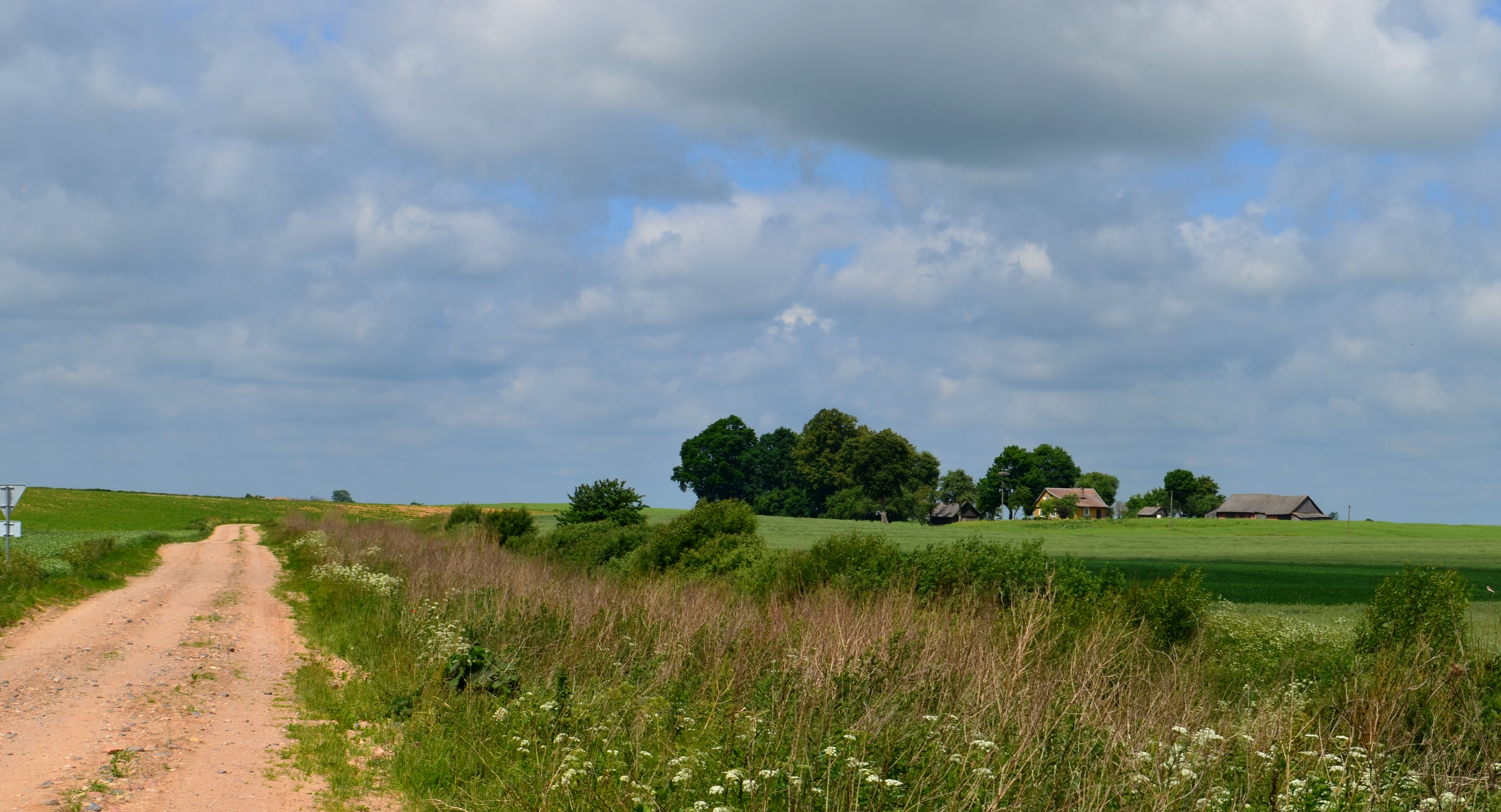

- Location in Lithuania Žebgraužiai (Lithuania)
- Coordinates: 55°22′30″N 23°42′11″E
- Country: Lithuania
- County: Kaunas County
- Municipality: Kėdainiai district municipality
- Eldership: Krakės Eldership

Population (2011)
  - Total: 0
- Time zone: UTC+2 (EET)
  - Summer (DST): UTC+3 (EEST)

Žebgraužiai (formerly Russian: Жабграуже, Polish: Żabgrauże) is a village in Kėdainiai district municipality, in Kaunas County, in central Lithuania. According to the 2011 census, the village was uninhabited. It is located 1 kilometre (0.62 mi) from Pajieslys, on the Pajieslys Ridge.

== Demography ==
Historical population

Year	Pop.	±% p.a.
1902	59	—
1923	49	−0.88%
1959	41	−0.49%
1970	32	−2.23%

Year	Pop.	±% p.a.
1979	25	−2.71%
1989	8	−10.77%
2001	5	−3.84%
2011	0	−100.00%

Source: 1902, 1923, 1959 & 1970, 1979, 1989, 2001, 2011
