= Vantainiai, Kėdainiai =

Vantainiai
- Village
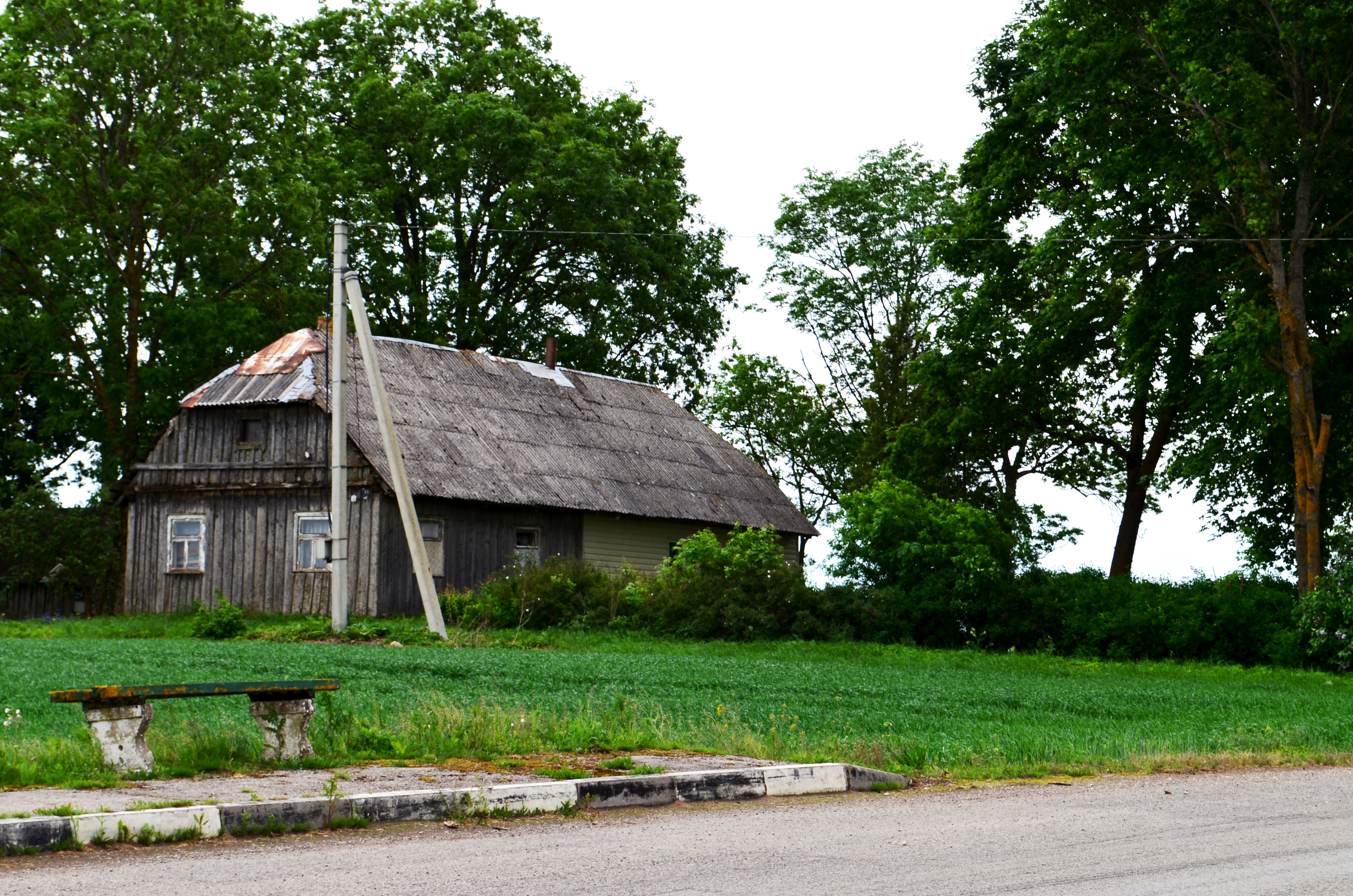

- Location in Lithuania Vantainiai (Lithuania)
- Coordinates: 55°26′31″N 23°41′10″E
- Country: Lithuania
- County: Kaunas County
- Municipality: Kėdainiai district municipality
- Eldership: Krakės Eldership

Population (2011)
  - Total: 1
- Time zone: UTC+2 (EET)
  - Summer (DST): UTC+3 (EEST)

Vantainiai (formerly Russian: Вонтайне, Polish: Wontajnie) is a village in Kėdainiai district municipality, in Kaunas County, in central Lithuania. According to the 2011 census, the village had a population of one person. It is located 4 kilometres (2.5 mi) from Krakės, by the Smilgaitė rivulet, alongside the Grinkiškis-Krakės road.

== Demography ==
Historical population

Year	Pop.	±% p.a.
1902	148	—
1923	101	−1.80%
1959	62	−1.35%
1970	53	−1.42%

Year	Pop.	±% p.a.
1979	17	−11.87%
1989	10	−5.17%
2001	9	−0.87%
2011	1	−19.73%

Source: 1902, 1923, 1959 & 1970, 1979, 1989, 2001, 2011

== Images ==
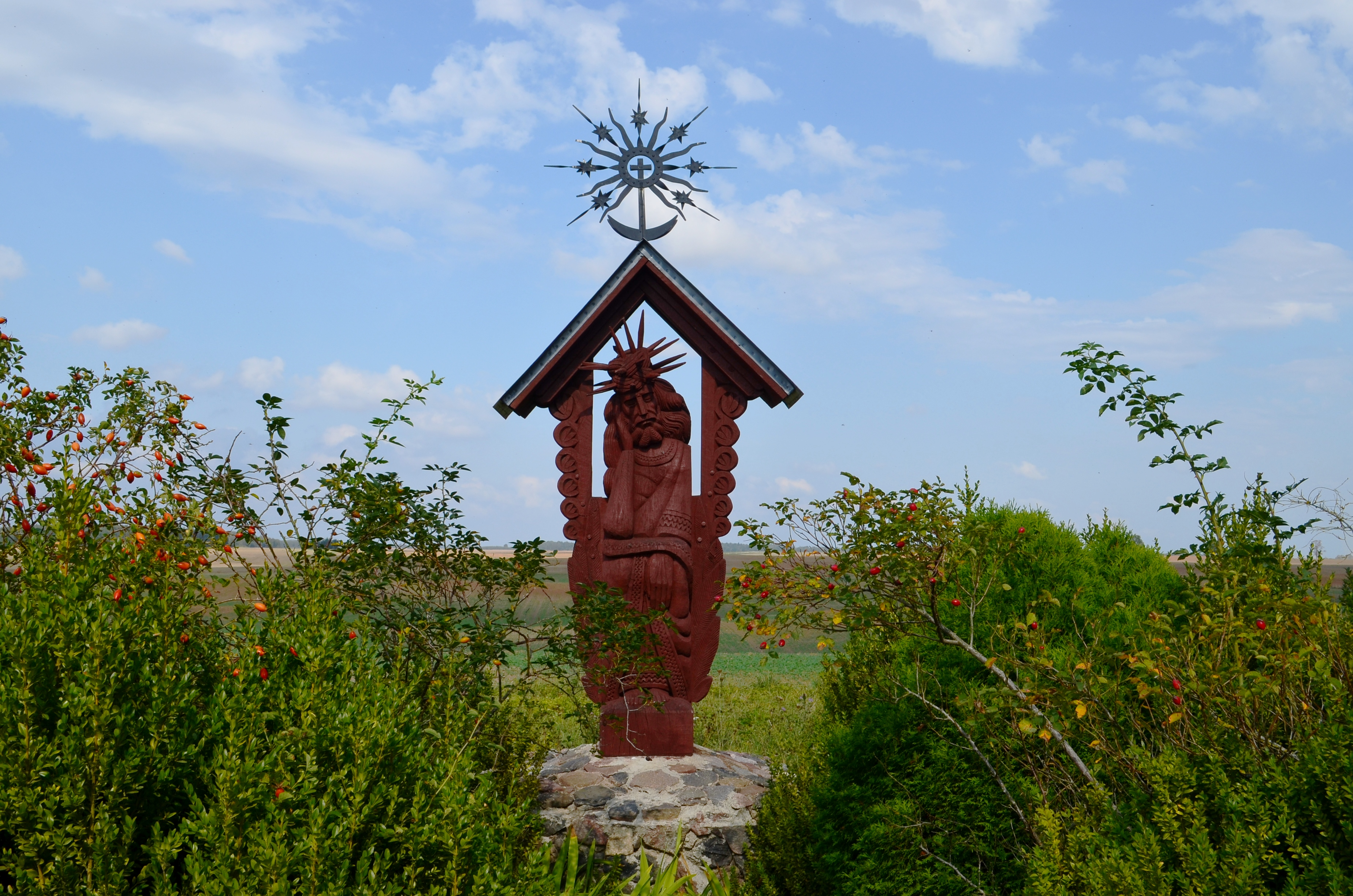
Pensive Christ sculpture

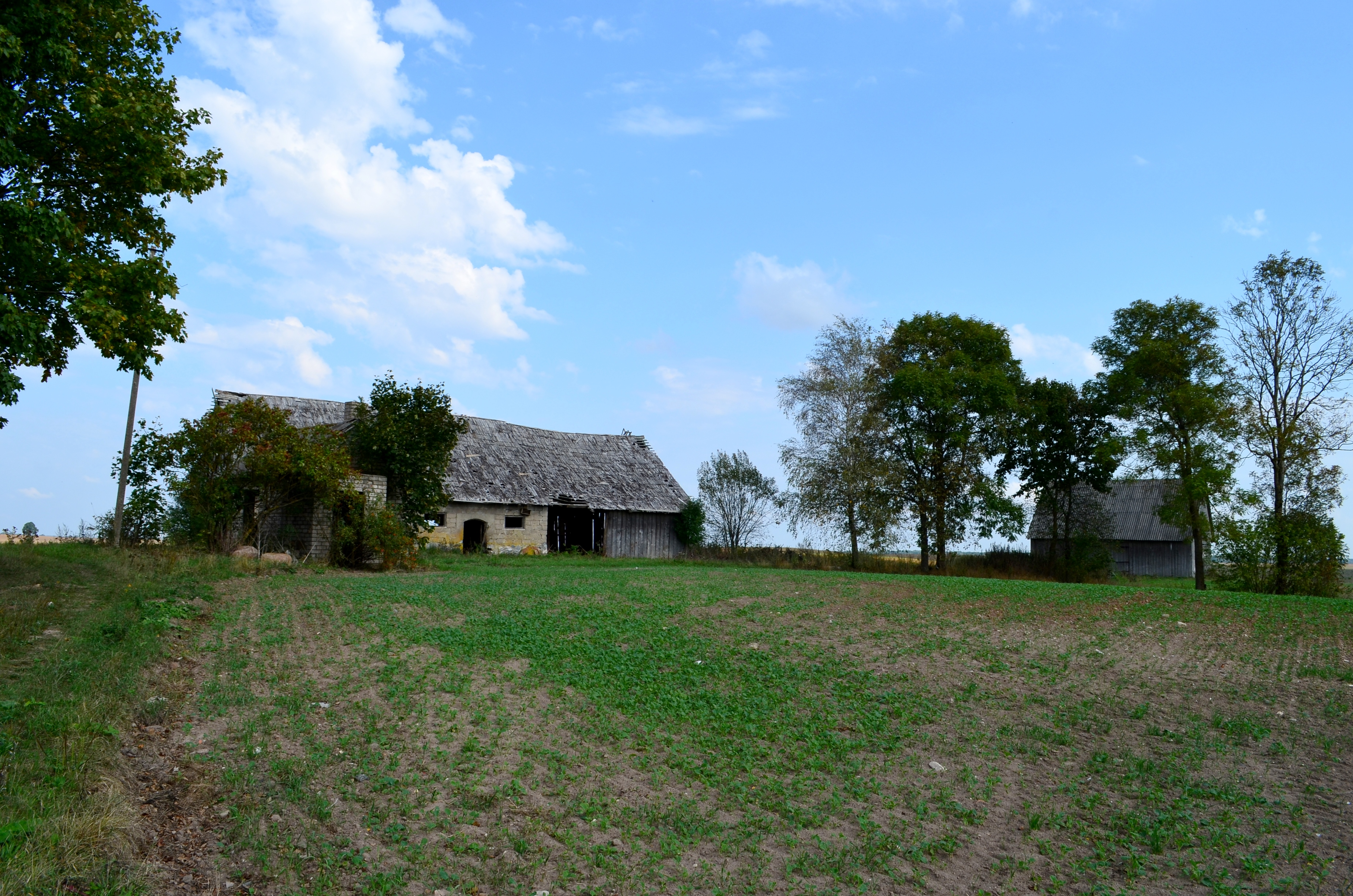
Abandoned homestead
