= Purvaičiai, Kėdainiai =

Purvaičiai
- Village
- Location in Lithuania Purvaičiai (Lithuania)
- Coordinates: 55°22′30″N 23°40′32″E
- Country: Lithuania
- County: Kaunas County
- Municipality: Kėdainiai district municipality
- Eldership: Krakės Eldership

Population (2011)
  - Total: 0
- Time zone: UTC+2 (EET)
  - Summer (DST): UTC+3 (EEST)

Purvaičiai (formerly Russian: Пурвайци) is a village in Kėdainiai district municipality, in Kaunas County, in central Lithuania. According to the 2011 census, the village was uninhabited. It is located 2.5 kilometres (1.6 mi) from Meironiškiai, by the Paropėlė rivulet.

There were Purvaičiai estate and homestead before the Soviet era.

== Demography ==
Historical population

Year	Pop.	±% p.a.
1902	62	—
1923	50	−1.02%
1959	13	−3.67%
1970	13	+0.00%

Year	Pop.	±% p.a.
1979	6	−8.23%
1989	0	−100.00%
2001	0	0.00%
2011	0	0.00%

Source: 1902, 1923, 1959 & 1970, 1979, 1989, 2001, 2011
