= Keturkiemiai =

- Village
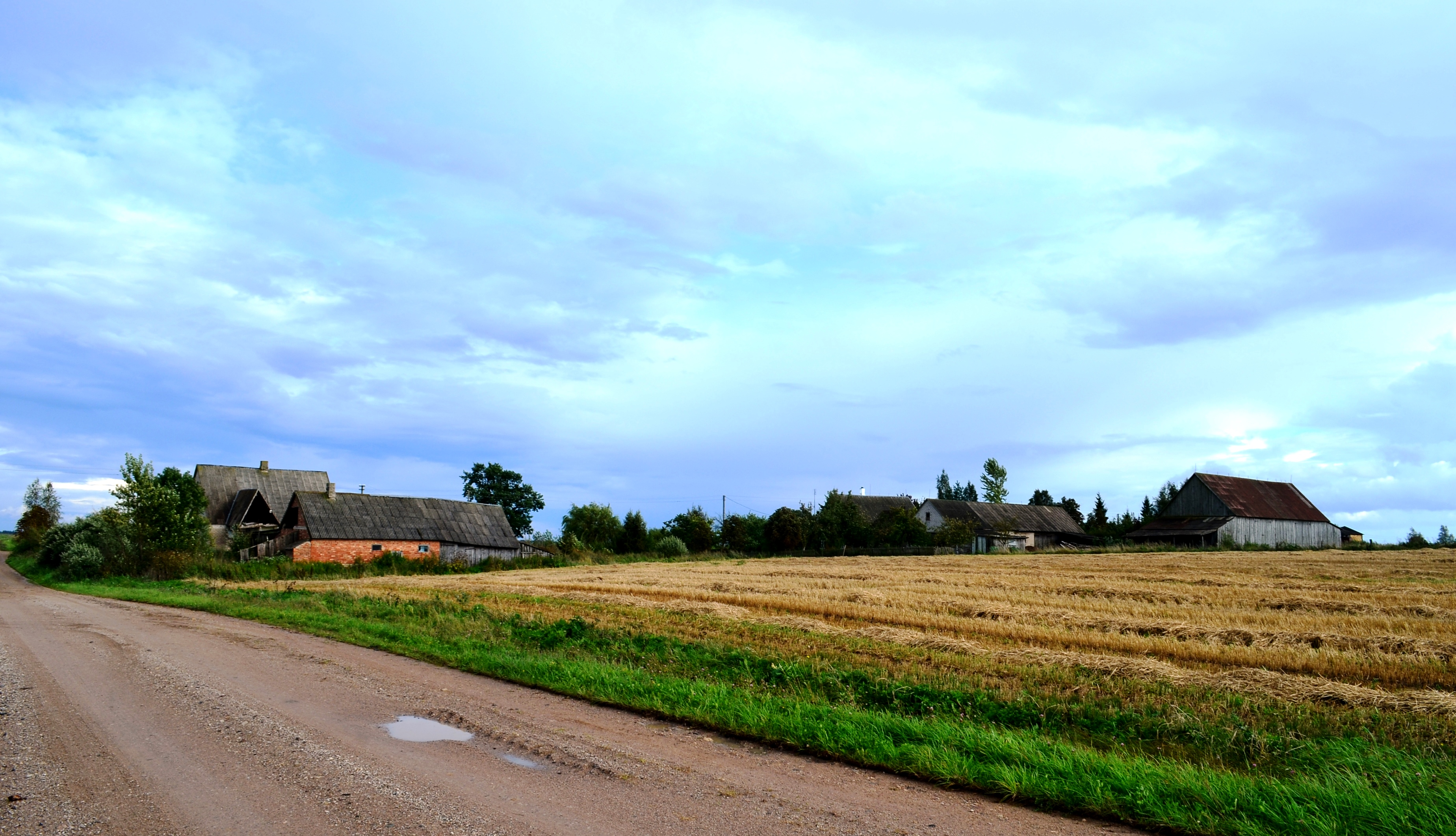

- Location in Lithuania Keturkiemiai (Lithuania)
- Coordinates: 55°27′11″N 23°42′50″E
- Country: Lithuania
- County: Kaunas County
- Municipality: Kėdainiai district municipality
- Eldership: Krakės Eldership

Population (2011)
  - Total: 27
- Time zone: UTC+2 (EET)
  - Summer (DST): UTC+3 (EEST)

Keturkiemiai (formerly Polish: Kieturkiemie, Russian: Кетуркели) is a village in Kėdainiai district municipality, in Kaunas County, in central Lithuania. According to the 2011 census, the village had a population of 27 people. It is located 5 kilometres (3.1 mi) from Krakės, by the road Mantviliškis-Vosiliškis and the Jaugila river.

== Demography ==
Historical population

Year	Pop.	±% p.a.
1902	94	—
1923	77	−0.95%
1959	67	−0.39%
1970	91	+2.82%

Year	Pop.	±% p.a.
1979	70	−2.87%
1989	25	−9.78%
2001	23	−0.69%
2011	27	+1.62%

Source: 1902, 1923, 1959 & 1970, 1979, 1989, 2001, 2011

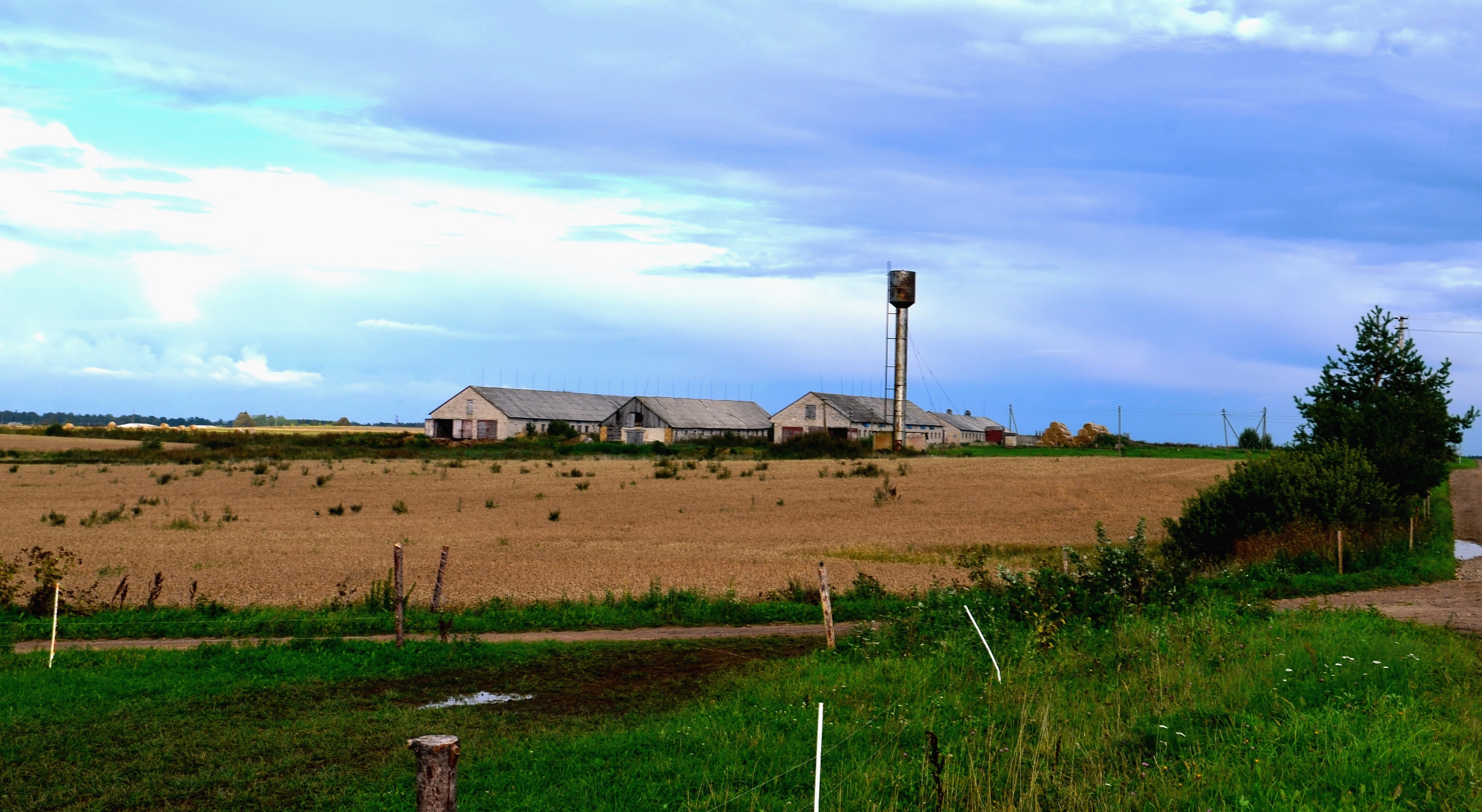
Keturkiemiai farm
