= Krakės Eldership =

Krakės Eldership Krakių seniūnija
- Eldership
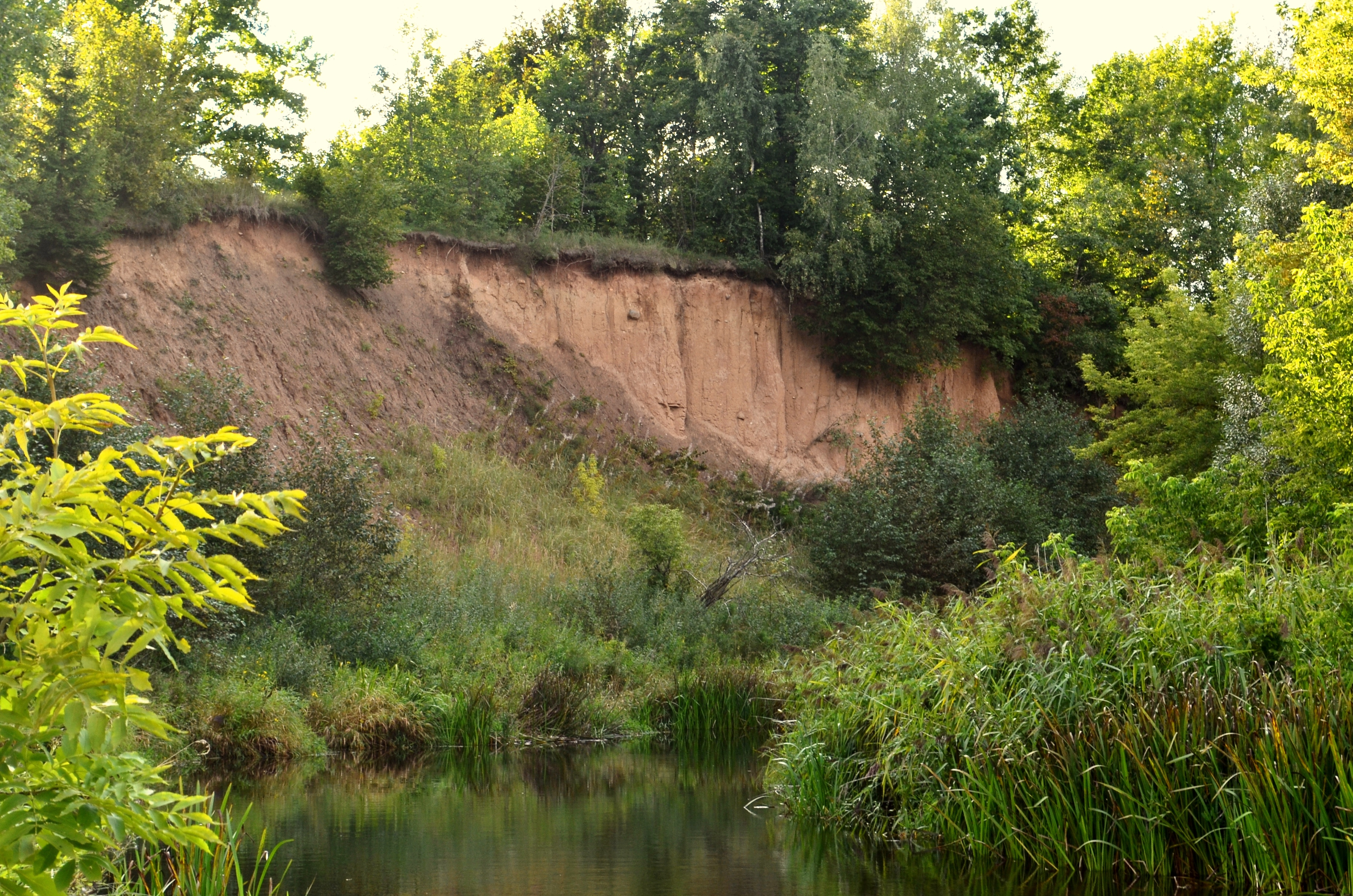
- Vosbučiai Outcrop

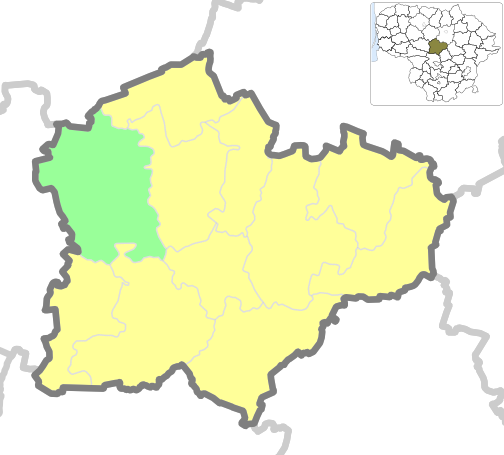
- Location of Krakės eldership
- Country: Lithuania
- Ethnographic region: Aukštaitija
- County: Kaunas County
- Municipality: Kėdainiai District Municipality
- Administrative centre: Krakės

Area
  - Total: 164 km^{2} (63 sq mi)

Population (2011)
  - Total: 3,064
  - Density: 18.7/km^{2} (48.4/sq mi)
- Time zone: UTC+2 (EET)
  - Summer (DST): UTC+3 (EEST)

Krakės Eldership (Lithuanian: Krakių seniūnija) is a Lithuanian eldership, located in the northwestern part of Kėdainiai District Municipality.

Eldership was created from the Krakės selsovet in 1993.

== Geography ==
The territory of Krakės Eldership is located in the East Samogitian Plateau. Relief is mostly flat, in some places slightly undulated. Altitudes reach 100–105 meters above the sea level.

- Rivers: Šušvė with its tributaries (Ažytė, Pečiupė, Pilsupys, Skerdūmė), Smilga with its tributaries (Jaugila, Smilgaitis, Tranys).
- Lakes and ponds: Baublys, Rukai Lake, Jaugiliai Lake, Rimkai Lake, Plinkaigalis Lake, part of the Angiriai Reservoir, Skerdūmė Pond.
- Forests: Krakės-Dotnuva Forest, Josvainiai Forest, Lapkalnys-Paliepiai Forest.
- Protected areas: Pajieslys Geomorphological Sanctuary, Pašušvys Landscape Sanctuary, Smilga Landscape Sanctuary, Baublys Ornitological Sanctuary, Vosbučiai Botanical-Zoological Sanctuary, Zembiškis Forest Botanical Sanctuary.

== Places of interest ==
- Catholic church of St. Matthew in Krakės, wooden Catholic church of St. Mary in Pajieslys
- Hillforts of Vosbučiai, Pilsupiai, Ambraziūnai and Plinkaigalis
- Manor relics in Pašušvys
- Barkūniškiai Watermill
- Skinderiškis Dendrological Park
- Plinkaigalis ancient burial place
- Piluspiai and Vosbučiai outcrops
- Meironiškiai stones
- Krakės historical town
- Krakės Jewish cemetery
- Ancient cemeteries of Pališkėliai, Plaukiai and Rezgiai

== Populated places ==
Following settlements are located in the Krakės Eldership (as for 2011 census):

- Towns: Krakės
- Villages: Ambraziūnai · Antežeriai · Antkalnis · Apirubiai · Apušrotas · Aukštuoliukai · Ažytėnai · Ąžuolytė · Bagotiškiai · Barkūnėliai · Barkūniškis · Beržytė · Černovka · Čystapolis · Daržbalys · Degimai · Deveikiškėliai · Deveikiškiai · Digraičiai · Diksiai · Donava · Dovydiškiai · Gaideliai · Gersonė · Girynė · Girvainiai · Gudaičiai · Guptilčiai · Jankūnai · Jaugiliai · Jaugilka · Jurgaičiai · Keturkiemiai · Krakės · Krymas · Kukoriškiai · Lenčiai · Liubokinė · Maconiai · Mąstautai · Medininkai · Meironiškėliai · Meironiškiai · Mikniūnai · Milvydai · Mumaičiai · Norkūnai · Pajieslys ·Pakarkliai · Palainiškiai · Pališkėliai · Pališkiai · Parezgys · Paropėlis · Paskardžiai · Paskerdūmiukas · Paskerdūmys · Pašušvys · Patranys · Peštiniukai · Pilsupėliai · Pilsupiai · Plaukiai · Plinkaigalis ·Purvaičiai · Rėguliai · Rezgiai · Rezgiukai · Rimkai · Rukai· Simoniškiai · Skirgailinė · Slabada · Sutkūnai · Šilainiai · Šmotiškėliai · Šmotiškiai · Špitolpievis · Šulaičiai · Šulcava · Tauginiškiai · Trakai · Ustronė · Užvarčiai · Vailainiai · Vantainiai · Vytautinė · Vosbučiai · Zembiškis · Žalioji · Žebgraužiai · Žitaičiai
- Hamlets: Girlaukis
