= Krymas =

- Village
- Location in Lithuania Krymas (Lithuania)
- Coordinates: 55°24′0″N 23°41′15″E
- Country: Lithuania
- County: Kaunas County
- Municipality: Kėdainiai district municipality
- Eldership: Krakės Eldership

Population (2011)
  - Total: 0
- Time zone: UTC+2 (EET)
  - Summer (DST): UTC+3 (EEST)

Krymas ('Crimea', formerly Russian: Крымъ) is a village in Kėdainiai district municipality, in Kaunas County, in central Lithuania. According to the 2011 census, the village was uninhabited. It is located 4 kilometres (2.5 mi) from Krakės, nearby the Digraitė rivulet.

Till the Soviet era it was a folwark. Later it was depopulated during land improvement programs.

== Demography ==
Historical population

Year	Pop.	±% p.a.
1902	11	—
1923	17	+2.09%
1959	16	−0.17%
1970	7	−7.24%

Year	Pop.	±% p.a.
1979	2	−12.99%
1989	0	−100.00%
2001	0	0.00%
2011	0	0.00%

Source: 1902, 1923, 1959 & 1970, 1979, 1989, 2001, 2011
