= Gersonė =

- Village
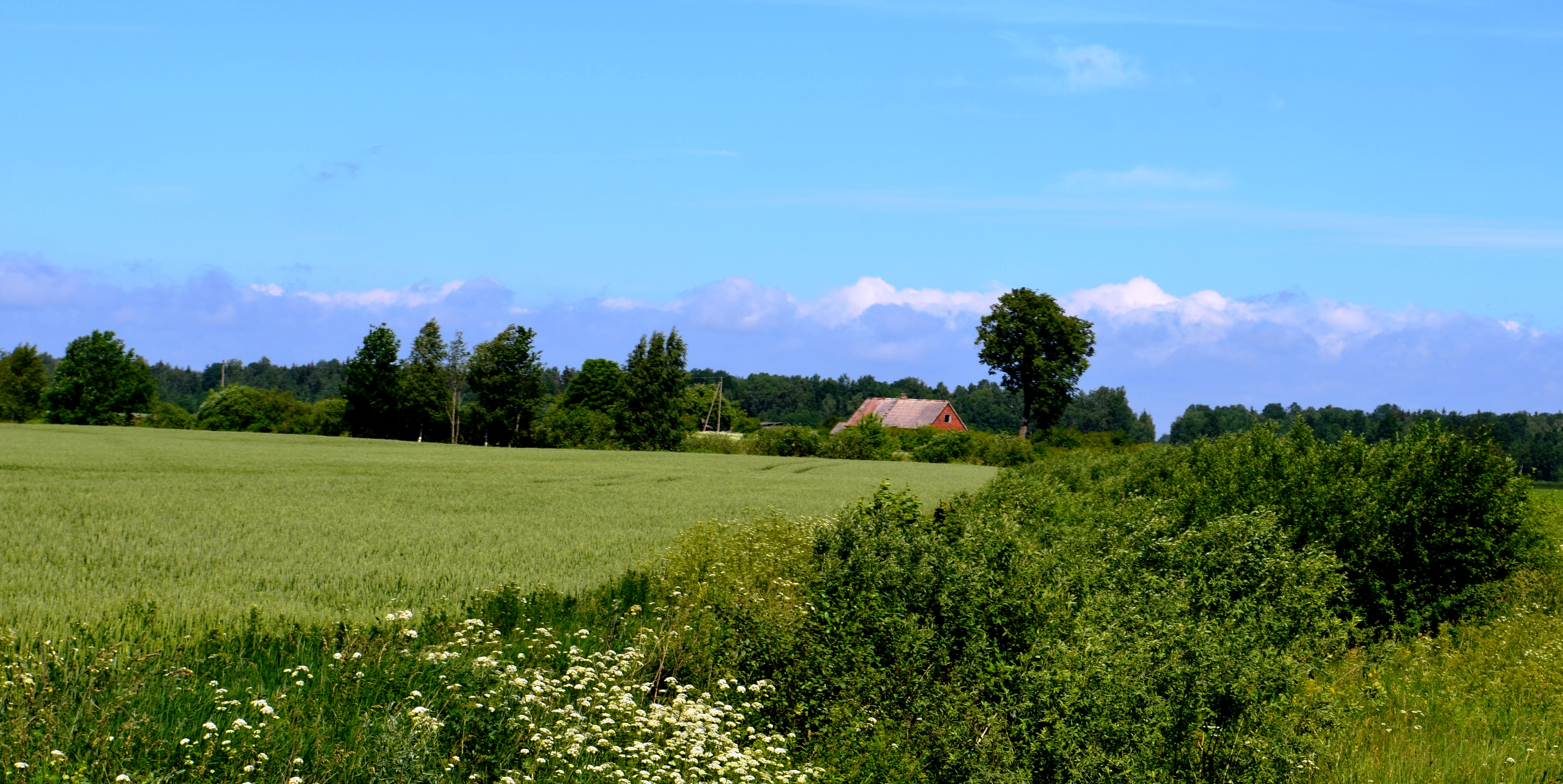

- Location in Lithuania Gersonė (Lithuania)
- Coordinates: 55°21′29″N 23°46′08″E
- Country: Lithuania
- County: Kaunas County
- Municipality: Kėdainiai district municipality
- Eldership: Krakės Eldership

Population (2011)
  - Total: 0
- Time zone: UTC+2 (EET)
  - Summer (DST): UTC+3 (EEST)

Gersonė (formerly Russian: Герсони) is a village in Kėdainiai district municipality, in Kaunas County, in central Lithuania. According to the 2011 census, the village was uninhabited. It is located 6 kilometres (3.7 mi) from Krakės, nearby Medininkai village, by the Kėdainiai-Krakės road.

== Demography ==
Historical population

| Year | Pop. | ±% p.a. |
|---|---|---|
| 1902 | 22 | — |
| 1923 | 45 | +3.47% |
| 1959 | 11 | −3.84% |
| 1970 | 12 | +0.79% |

| Year | Pop. | ±% p.a. |
|---|---|---|
| 1979 | 6 | −7.41% |
| 1989 | 1 | −16.40% |
| 2001 | 0 | −100.00% |
| 2011 | 0 | 0.00% |

Source: 1902, 1923, 1959 & 1970, 1979, 1989, 2001, 2011
