= Mumaičiai, Kėdainiai =

Mumaičiai
- Village
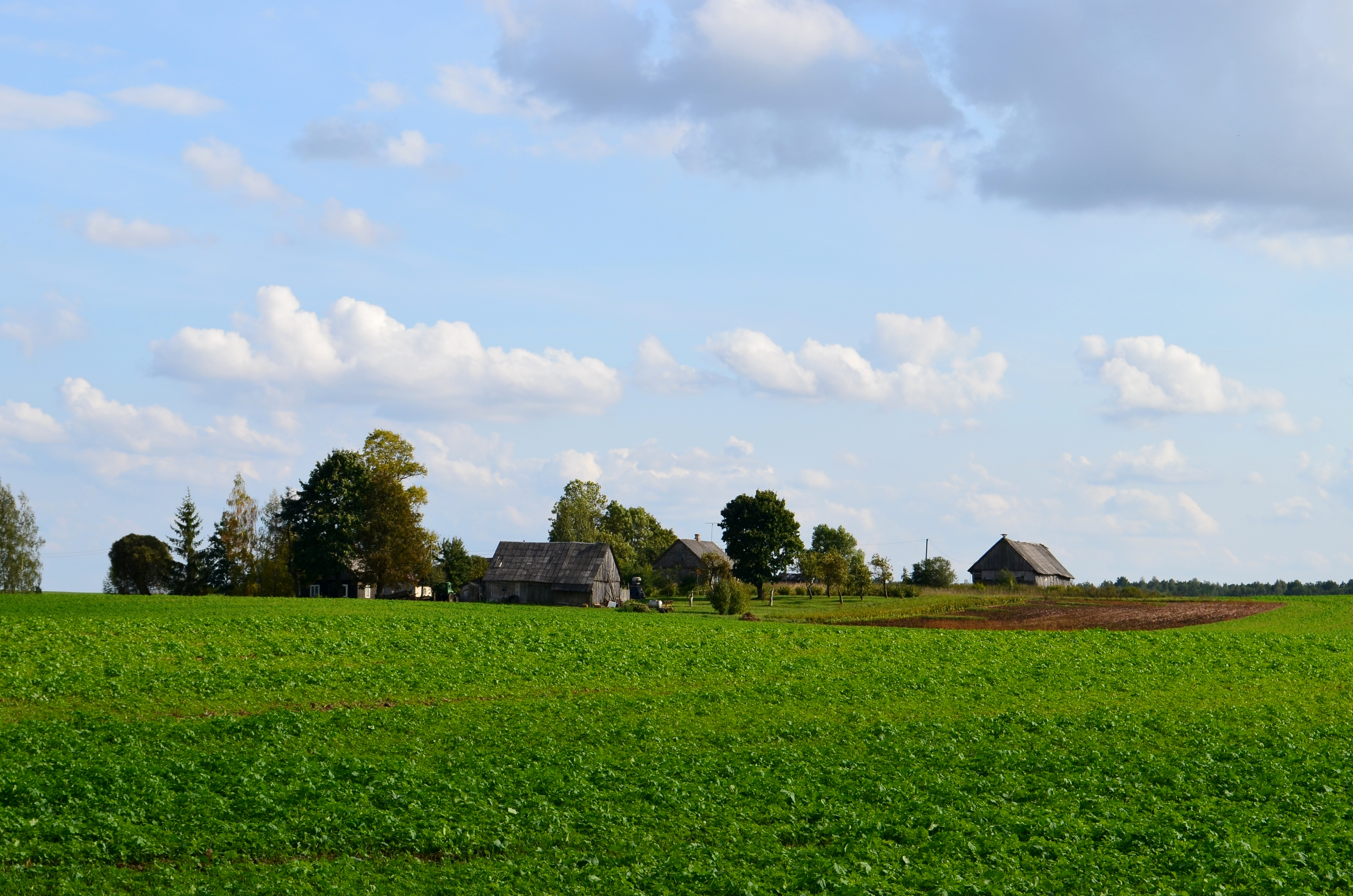

- Location in Lithuania Mumaičiai (Lithuania)
- Coordinates: 55°28′08″N 23°41′10″E
- Country: Lithuania
- County: Kaunas County
- Municipality: Kėdainiai district municipality
- Eldership: Krakės Eldership

Population (2011)
  - Total: 7
- Time zone: UTC+2 (EET)
  - Summer (DST): UTC+3 (EEST)

Mumaičiai (Russian: Мумайце, Polish: Mamajcie) is a village in Kėdainiai district municipality, in Kaunas County, in central Lithuania. According to the 2011 census, the village had a population of 7 people. It is located 4.5 kilometres (2.8 mi) from Ažytėnai, between the Vinkšupis (a tributary of the Šušvė) and the Srautas (a tributary of the Dotnuvėlė) rivers.

== Demography ==
Historical population

Year	Pop.	±% p.a.
1902	72	—
1923	99	+1.53%
1959	63	−1.25%
1970	38	−4.49%

Year	Pop.	±% p.a.
1979	14	−10.50%
1989	10	−3.31%
2001	10	+0.00%
2011	7	−3.50%

Source: 1902, 1923, 1959 & 1970, 1979, 1989, 2001, 2011
