= Beržytė, Kėdainiai =

Beržytė
- Village
- Location in Lithuania Beržytė (Lithuania)
- Coordinates: 55°20′45″N 23°37′20″E
- Country: Lithuania
- County: Kaunas County
- Municipality: Kėdainiai district municipality
- Eldership: Krakės Eldership

Population (2011)
  - Total: 0
- Time zone: UTC+2 (EET)
  - Summer (DST): UTC+3 (EEST)

Beržytė ('a little place of birch trees', formerly Russian: Бержите) is a village in Kėdainiai district municipality, in Kaunas County, in central Lithuania. According to the 2011 census, the village was uninhabited. It is located 4 kilometres (2.5 mi) from Pajieslys, on the edge of the Lapkalnys-Paliepiai Forest.

== Demography ==
Historical population

Year	Pop.	±% p.a.
1902	8	—
1959	4	−1.21%
1970	5	+2.05%
1979	0	−100.00%

Year	Pop.	±% p.a.
1989	0	0.00%
2001	0	0.00%
2011	0	0.00%

Source: 1902, 1923, 1959 & 1970, 1979, 1989, 2001, 2011
