= Gaideliai, Kėdainiai =

Gaideliai
- Village
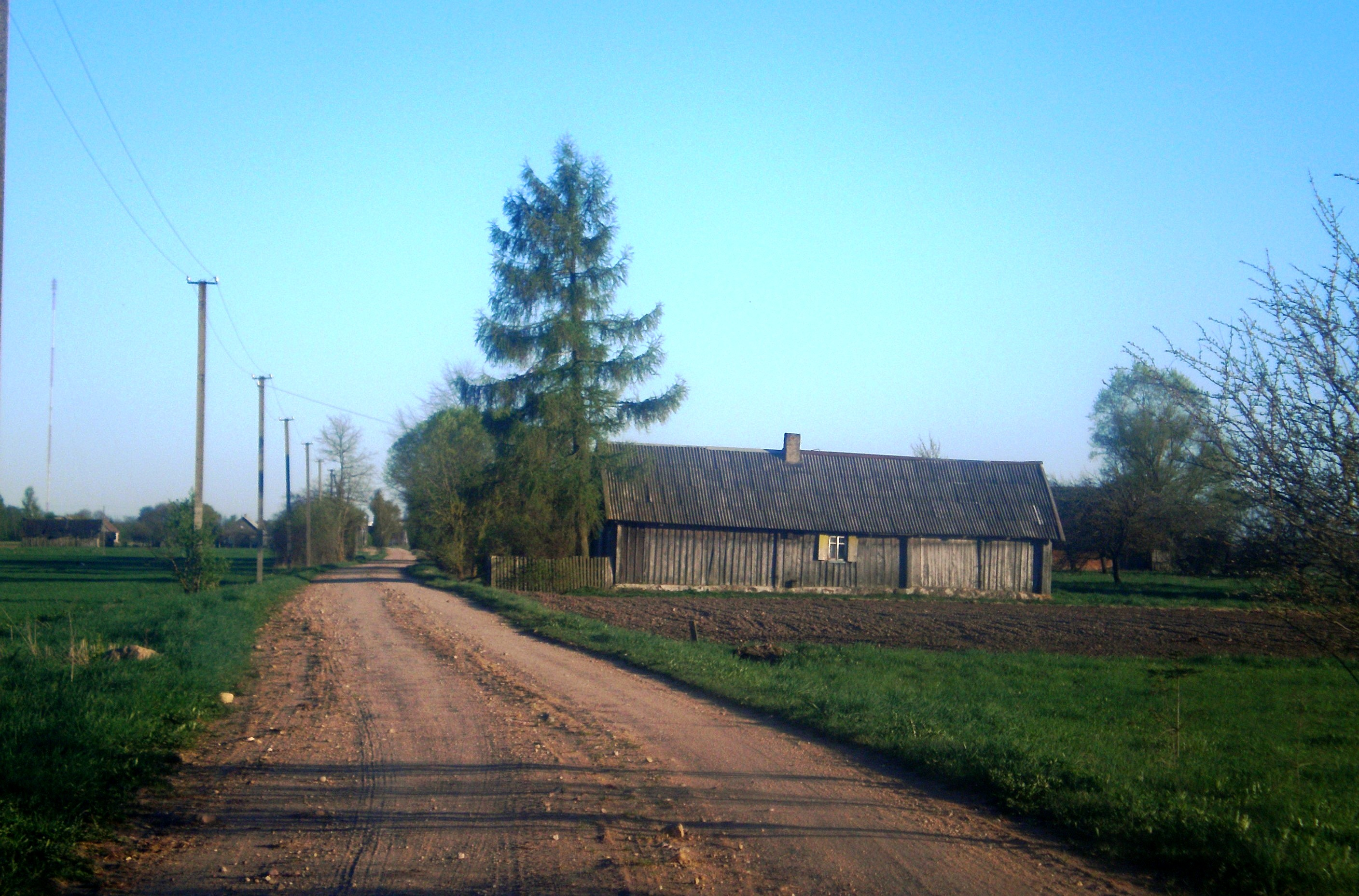

- Location in Lithuania Gaideliai (Lithuania)
- Coordinates: 55°27′40″N 23°38′31″E
- Country: Lithuania
- County: Kaunas County
- Municipality: Kėdainiai district municipality
- Eldership: Krakės Eldership

Population (2011)
  - Total: 3
- Time zone: UTC+2 (EET)
  - Summer (DST): UTC+3 (EEST)

Gaideliai (formerly Polish: Gajdele, Russian: Гайдели) is a village in Kėdainiai district municipality, in Kaunas County, in central Lithuania. According to the 2011 census, the village had a population of 3 people. It is located 2 kilometres (1.2 mi) from Ažytėnai, 3.5 kilometres (2.2 mi) from Vaitiekūnai, nearby the Šušvė river.

== Demography ==
Historical population

Year	Pop.	±% p.a.
1902	39	—
1923	53	+1.47%
1959	32	−1.39%
1970	33	+0.28%

Year	Pop.	±% p.a.
1979	24	−3.48%
1989	12	−6.70%
2001	8	−3.32%
2011	3	−9.34%

Source: 1902, 1923, 1959 & 1970, 1979, 1989, 2001, 2011
