= Peštiniukai =

- Village
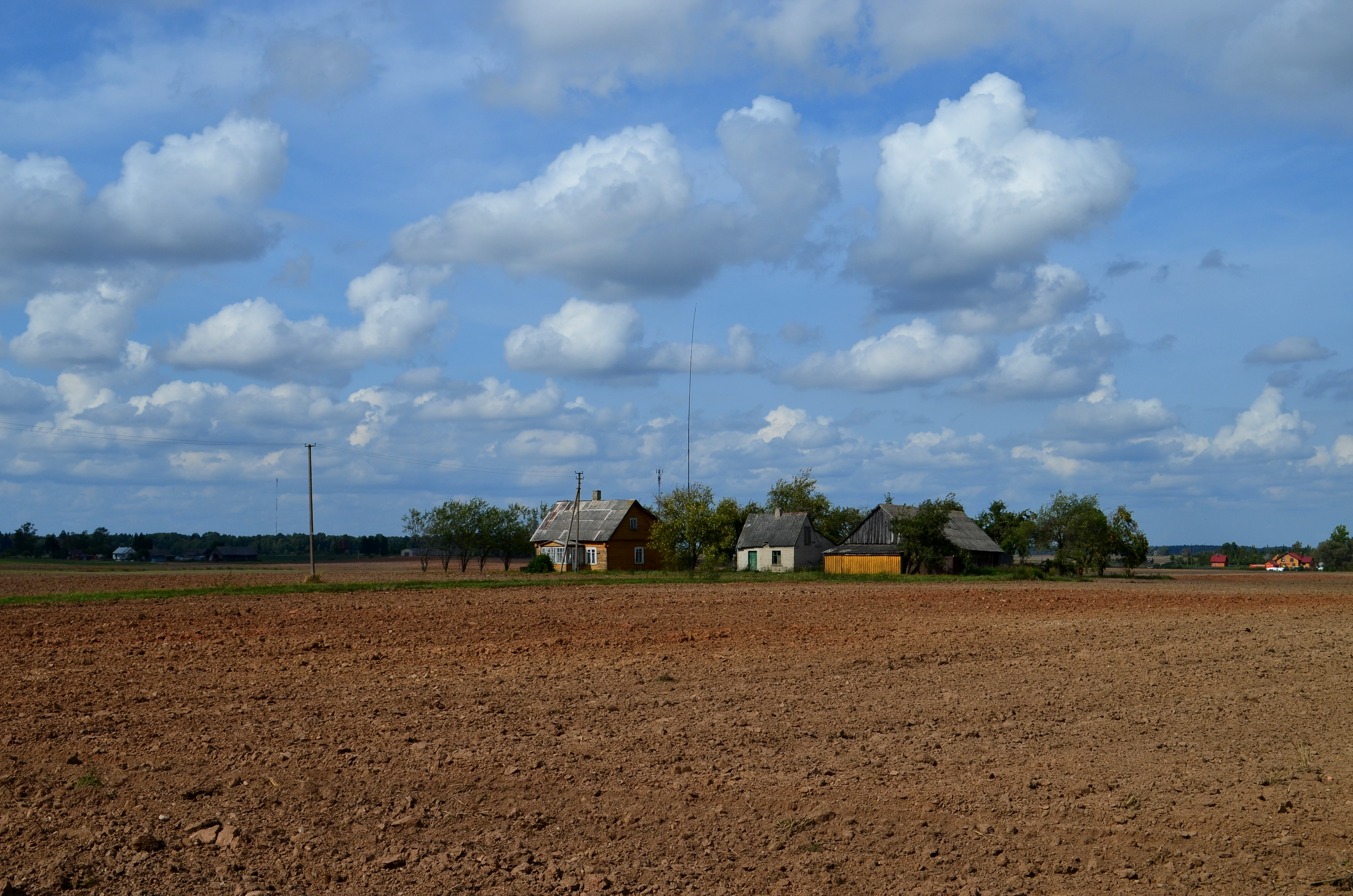

- Location in Lithuania Peštiniukai (Lithuania)
- Coordinates: 55°24′50″N 23°42′22″E
- Country: Lithuania
- County: Kaunas County
- Municipality: Kėdainiai district municipality
- Eldership: Krakės Eldership

Population (2011)
  - Total: 8
- Time zone: UTC+2 (EET)
  - Summer (DST): UTC+3 (EEST)

Peštiniukai is a village in Kėdainiai district municipality, in Kaunas County, in central Lithuania. According to the 2011 census, the village had a population of 8 people. It is located 1 kilometre (0.62 mi) from Krakės, next to the Krakės cemetery, by the Smilgaitis river.

There is the Holocaust place of the Krakės Jews.

== Demography ==
Historical population

Year	Pop.	±% p.a.
1923	16	—
1959	27	+1.46%
1970	19	−3.14%
1979	12	−4.98%

Year	Pop.	±% p.a.
1989	7	−5.25%
2001	5	−2.76%
2011	8	+4.81%

Source: 1902, 1923, 1959 & 1970, 1979, 1989, 2001, 2011
