= Kukoriškiai, Kėdainiai =

Kukoriškiai
- Village
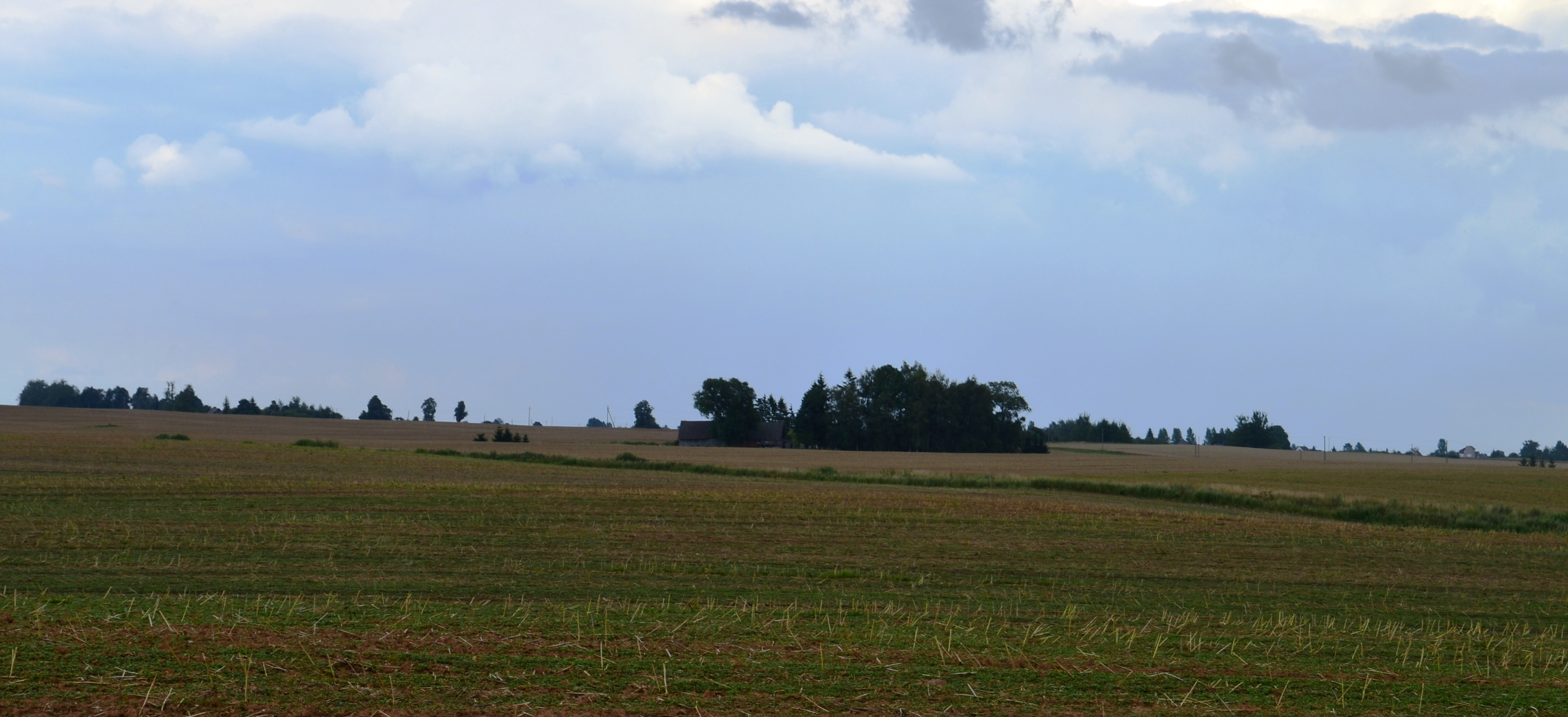

- Location in Lithuania Kukoriškiai (Lithuania)
- Coordinates: 55°22′59″N 23°41′31″E
- Country: Lithuania
- County: Kaunas County
- Municipality: Kėdainiai district municipality
- Eldership: Krakės Eldership

Population (2011)
  - Total: 5
- Time zone: UTC+2 (EET)
  - Summer (DST): UTC+3 (EEST)

Kukoriškiai (formerly Russian: Кухаришки) is a village in Kėdainiai district municipality, in Kaunas County, in central Lithuania. According to the 2011 census, the village had a population of 5 people. It is located 2 kilometres (1.2 mi) from Meironiškiai village.

== Demography ==
Historical population

Year	Pop.	±% p.a.
1902	9	—
1923	7	−1.19%
1959	23	+3.36%
1970	11	−6.49%

Year	Pop.	±% p.a.
1979	7	−4.90%
1989	3	−8.12%
2001	4	+2.43%
2011	5	+2.26%

Source: 1902, 1923, 1959 & 1970, 1979, 1989, 2001, 2011
