= Černovka =

- Village
- Location in Lithuania Černovka (Lithuania)
- Coordinates: 55°19′59″N 23°43′19″E
- Country: Lithuania
- County: Kaunas County
- Municipality: Kėdainiai district municipality
- Eldership: Krakės Eldership

Population (2011)
  - Total: 0
- Time zone: UTC+2 (EET)
  - Summer (DST): UTC+3 (EEST)

Černovka (from Slavic: 'a black place', formerly Russian: Черновка) is a village in Kėdainiai district municipality, in Kaunas County, in central Lithuania. According to the 2011 census, the village was uninhabited. It is located 7 kilometres (4.3 mi) from Pajieslys, nearby Deveikiškiai village.

== Demography ==
Historical population

Year	Pop.	±% p.a.
1902	11	—
1923	18	+2.37%
1959	10	−1.62%
1970	13	+2.41%

Year	Pop.	±% p.a.
1979	3	−15.03%
1989	0	−100.00%
2001	0	0.00%
2011	0	0.00%

Source: 1902, 1923, 1959 & 1970, 1979, 1989, 2001, 2011
