= Parezgys =

- Village
- Location in Lithuania Parezgys (Lithuania)
- Coordinates: 55°21′02″N 23°43′42″E
- Country: Lithuania
- County: Kaunas County
- Municipality: Kėdainiai district municipality
- Eldership: Krakės Eldership

Population (2011)
  - Total: 0
- Time zone: UTC+2 (EET)
  - Summer (DST): UTC+3 (EEST)

Parezgys (formerly Russian: Порѣзге, Polish: Porezgi) is a village in Kėdainiai district municipality, in Kaunas County, in central Lithuania. According to the 2011 census, the village was uninhabited. It is located 5 kilometres (3.1 mi) from Pajieslys, next to the Smilgaitis river and the Josvainiai Forest.

== Demography ==
Historical population

Year	Pop.	±% p.a.
1902	40	—
1923	41	+0.12%
1959	11	−3.59%
1970	21	+6.05%

Year	Pop.	±% p.a.
1979	7	−11.49%
1989	0	−100.00%
2001	0	0.00%
2011	0	0.00%

Source: 1902, 1923, 1959 & 1970, 1979, 1989, 2001, 2011
