= Girlaukis =

- Hamlet
- Location in Lithuania Girlaukis (Lithuania)
- Coordinates: 55°25′01″N 23°35′20″E
- Country: Lithuania
- County: Kaunas County
- Municipality: Kėdainiai district municipality
- Eldership: Krakės Eldership

Population (2011)
  - Total: 0
- Time zone: UTC+2 (EET)
  - Summer (DST): UTC+3 (EEST)

Girlaukis ('wood-field') is a hamlet in Kėdainiai district municipality, in Kaunas County, in central Lithuania. According to the 2011 census, the settlement was uninhabited. It is located 3 kilometres (1.9 mi) from Pašušvys, inside the Lapkalnys-Paliepiai Forest.

There was a forest ranger hut during the Soviet times.

== Demography ==
Historical population

Year	Pop.	±% p.a.
1979	8	—
1989	3	−9.34%

Year	Pop.	±% p.a.
2001	0	−100.00%
2011	0	0.00%

Source: 1902, 1923, 1959 & 1970, 1979, 1989, 2001, 2011
