= Šulaičiai, Kėdainiai =

Šulaičiai
- Village
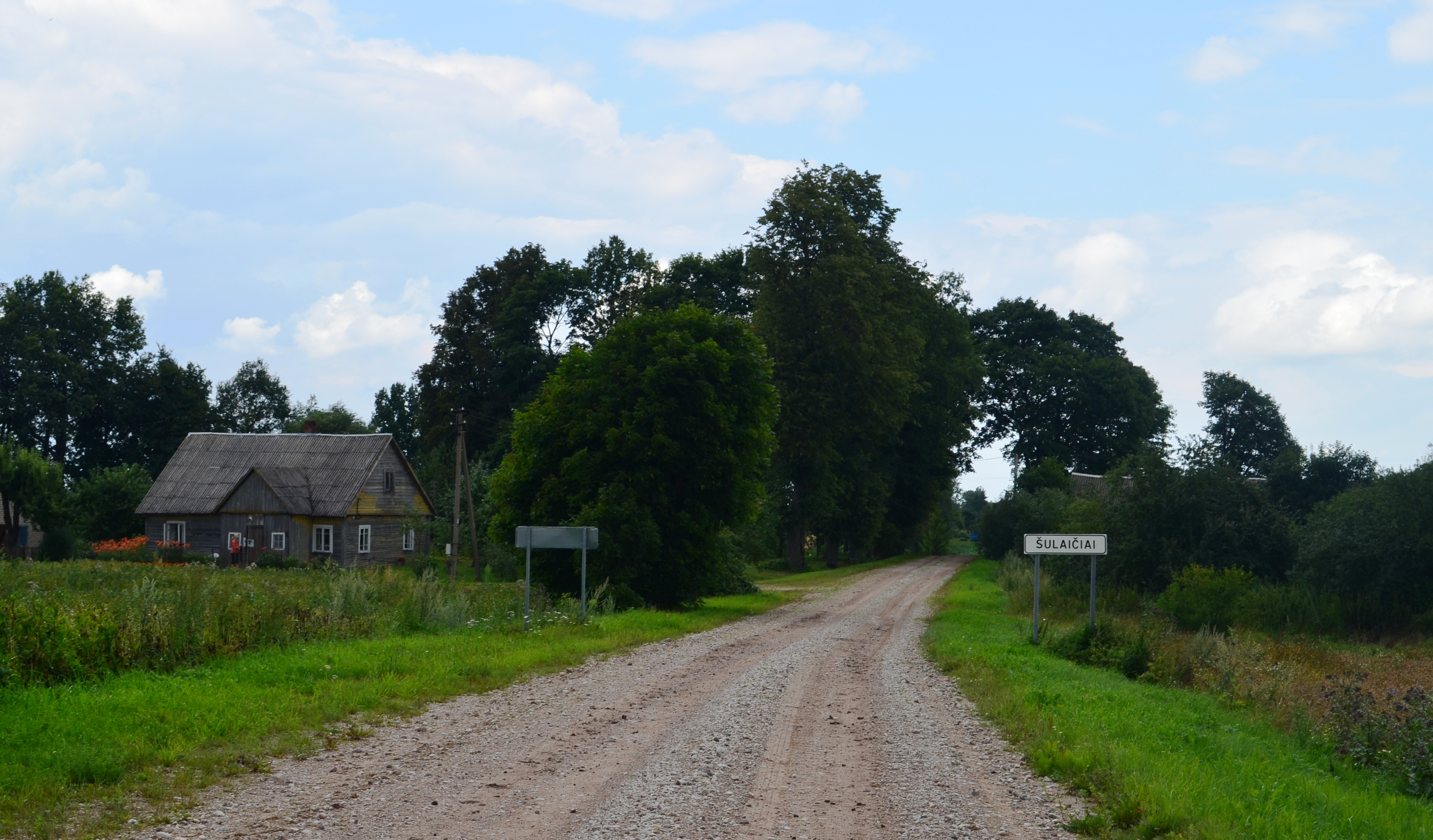

- Location in Lithuania Šulaičiai (Lithuania)
- Coordinates: 55°23′10″N 23°39′50″E
- Country: Lithuania
- County: Kaunas County
- Municipality: Kėdainiai district municipality
- Eldership: Krakės Eldership

Population (2011)
  - Total: 10
- Time zone: UTC+2 (EET)
  - Summer (DST): UTC+3 (EEST)

Šulaičiai (formerly Russian: Шолайци) is a village in Kėdainiai district municipality, in Kaunas County, in central Lithuania. According to the 2011 census, the village had a population of 10 people. It is located 4 kilometres (2.5 mi) from Krakės, by the Paliūnys rivulet. There is a cemetery.

== Demography ==
Historical population

Year	Pop.	±% p.a.
1902	158	—
1923	146	−0.38%
1959	124	−0.45%
1970	76	−4.35%

Year	Pop.	±% p.a.
1979	42	−6.38%
1989	16	−9.20%
2001	7	−6.66%
2011	10	+3.63%

Source: 1902, 1923, 1959 & 1970, 1979, 1989, 2001, 2011
