= Bagotiškiai =

- Village
- Location in Lithuania Bagotiškiai (Lithuania)
- Coordinates: 55°26′35″N 23°42′50″E
- Country: Lithuania
- County: Kaunas County
- Municipality: Kėdainiai district municipality
- Eldership: Krakės Eldership

Population (2011)
  - Total: 0
- Time zone: UTC+2 (EET)
  - Summer (DST): UTC+3 (EEST)

Bagotiškiai (formerly Polish: Bogatyszki, Russian: Богатышки) is a village in Kėdainiai district municipality, in Kaunas County, in central Lithuania. According to the 2011 census, the village was uninhabited. It is located 7 kilometres (4.3 mi) from Krakės.

At the beginning of the 20th century there was Bagotiškiai folwark.

== Demography ==
Historical population

Year	Pop.	±% p.a.
1902	51	—
1923	29	−2.65%
1959	21	−0.89%
1970	5	−12.23%

Year	Pop.	±% p.a.
1979	4	−2.45%
1989	0	−100.00%
2001	0	0.00%
2011	0	0.00%

Source: 1902, 1923, 1959 & 1970, 1979, 1989, 2001, 2011
