= Ustronė, Kėdainiai =

Ustronė
- Village
- Location in Lithuania Ustronė (Lithuania)
- Coordinates: 55°21′40″N 23°46′25″E
- Country: Lithuania
- County: Kaunas County
- Municipality: Kėdainiai district municipality
- Eldership: Krakės Eldership

Population (2011)
  - Total: 0
- Time zone: UTC+2 (EET)
  - Summer (DST): UTC+3 (EEST)

Ustronė (formerly Polish: Ustronie) is a village in Kėdainiai district municipality, in Kaunas County, in central Lithuania. According to the 2011 census, the village was uninhabited. It is located 1 kilometre (0.62 mi) from Medininkai, nearby the Krakės-Dotnuva Forest.

== Demography ==
Historical population

| Year | Pop. | ±% p.a. |
|---|---|---|
| 1902 | 44 | — |
| 1923 | 44 | +0.00% |
| 1959 | 28 | −1.25% |
| 1970 | 10 | −8.94% |

| Year | Pop. | ±% p.a. |
|---|---|---|
| 1989 | 0 | −100.00% |
| 1979 | 0 | 0.00% |
| 2001 | 1 | — |
| 2011 | 0 | −100.00% |

Source: 1902, 1923, 1959 & 1970, 1979, 1989, 2001, 2011
