= Paskardžiai =

- Village
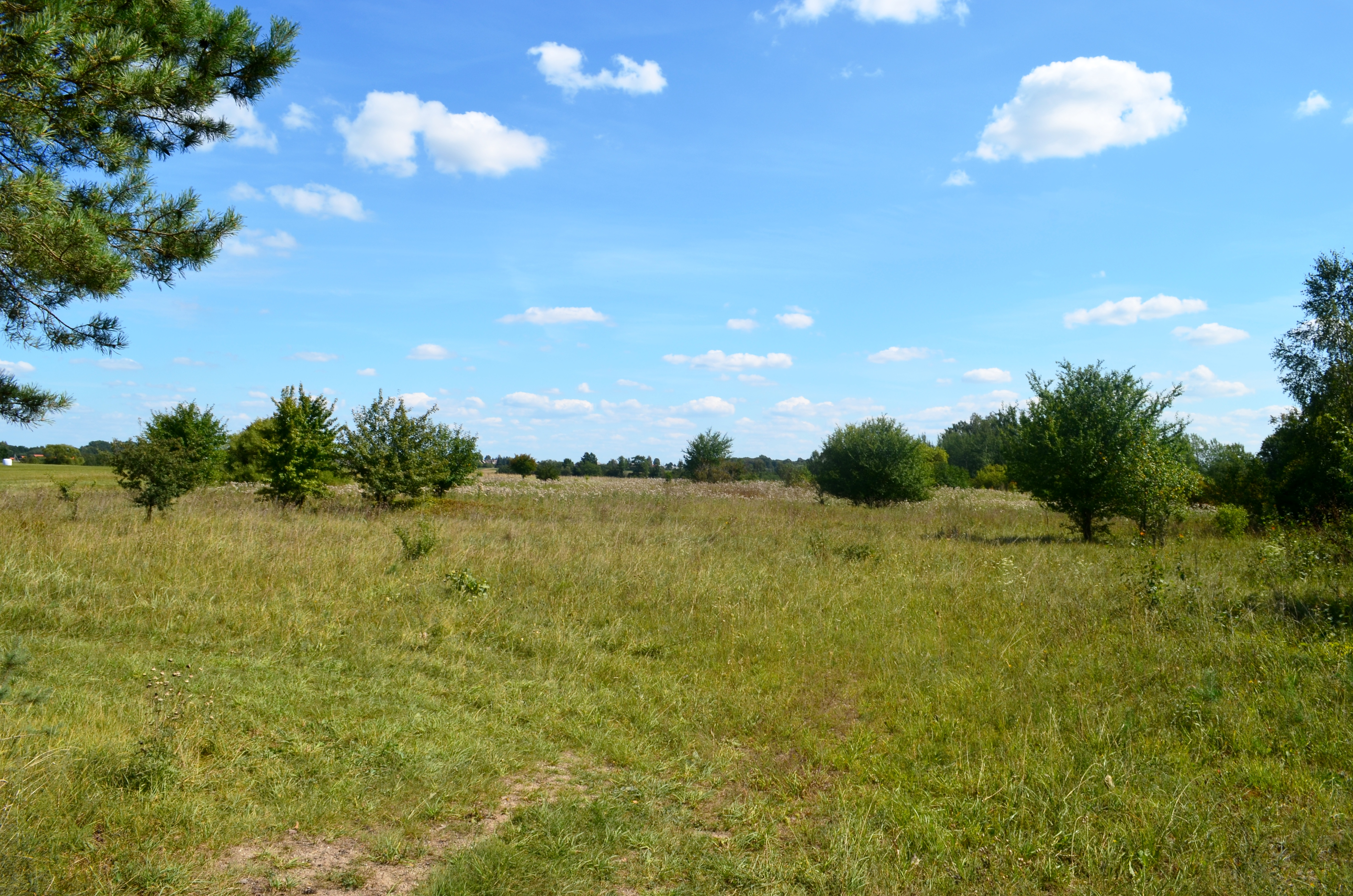

- Location in Lithuania Paskardžiai (Lithuania)
- Coordinates: 55°20′31″N 23°39′40″E
- Country: Lithuania
- County: Kaunas County
- Municipality: Kėdainiai district municipality
- Eldership: Krakės Eldership

Population (2011)
  - Total: 1
- Time zone: UTC+2 (EET)
  - Summer (DST): UTC+3 (EEST)

Paskardžiai (formerly Russian: Поскардзе, Polish: Poskordzie) is a village in Kėdainiai district municipality, in Kaunas County, in central Lithuania. According to the 2011 census, the village had a population of 1 person. It is located 2 kilometres (1.2 mi) from Deveikiškiai, by the Šušvė river and its tributary the Žirgupis.

== Demography ==
Historical population

Year	Pop.	±% p.a.
1902	22	—
1923	59	+4.81%
1959	26	−2.25%
1970	18	−3.29%

Year	Pop.	±% p.a.
1979	9	−7.41%
1989	3	−10.40%
2001	1	−8.75%
2011	1	+0.00%

Source: 1902, 1923, 1959 & 1970, 1979, 1989, 2001, 2011
