= Vytautinė =

- Village
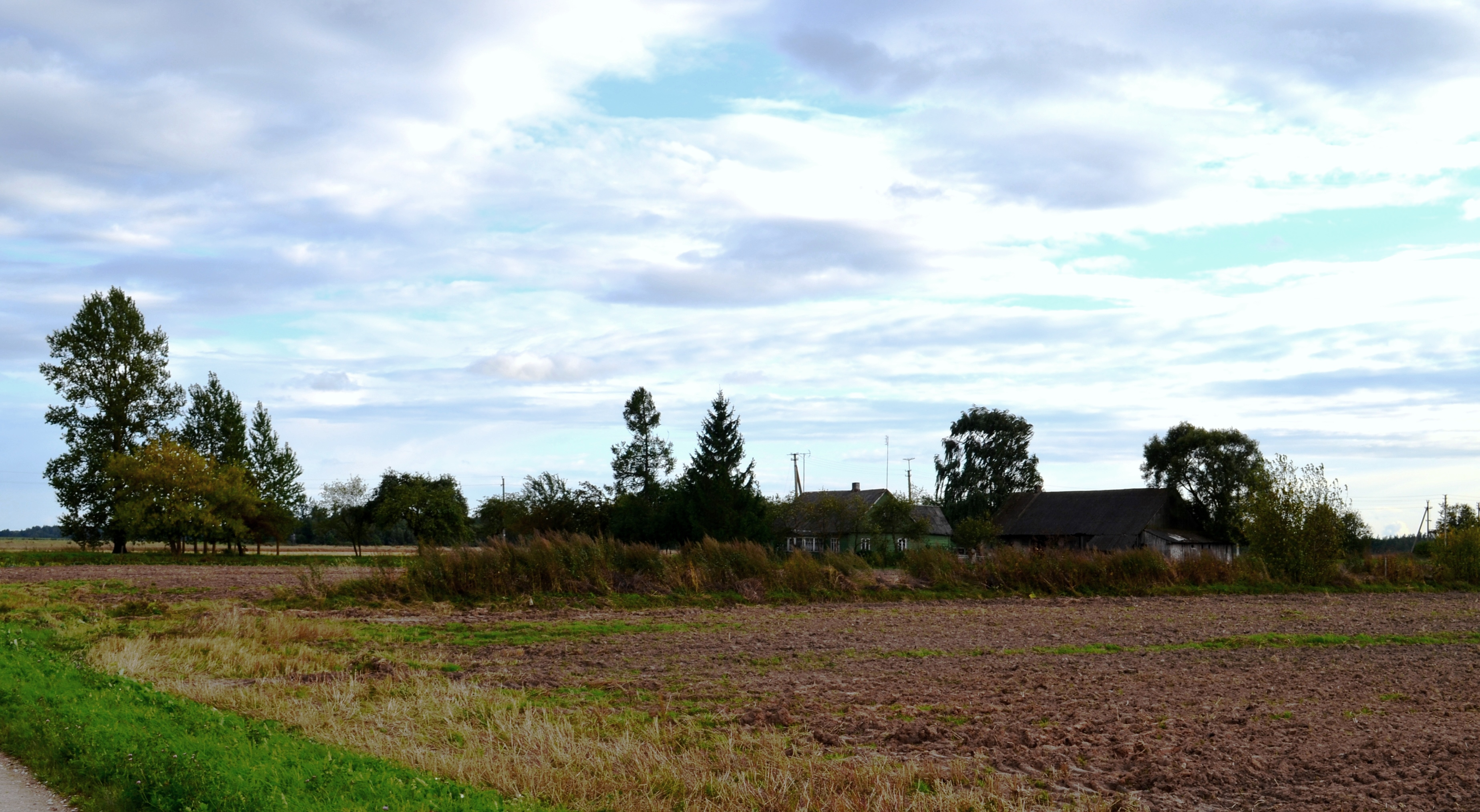

- Location in Lithuania Vytautinė (Lithuania)
- Coordinates: 55°23′49″N 23°37′01″E
- Country: Lithuania
- County: Kaunas County
- Municipality: Kėdainiai district municipality
- Eldership: Krakės Eldership

Population (2011)
  - Total: 0
- Time zone: UTC+2 (EET)
  - Summer (DST): UTC+3 (EEST)

Vytautinė (formerly Russian: Витольдово) is a village in Kėdainiai district municipality, in Kaunas County, in central Lithuania. According to the 2011 census, the village was uninhabited. It is located 2 kilometres (1.2 mi) from Pašušvys, nearby the Lapkalnys-Paliepiai Forest.

== Demography ==
Historical population

Year	Pop.	±% p.a.
1902	14	—
1923	16	+0.64%
1959	10	−1.30%
1970	5	−6.11%

Year	Pop.	±% p.a.
1979	2	−9.68%
1989	2	+0.00%
2001	0	−100.00%
2011	0	0.00%

Source: 1902, 1923, 1959 & 1970, 1979, 1989, 2001, 2011
