= Pališkiai =

- Village
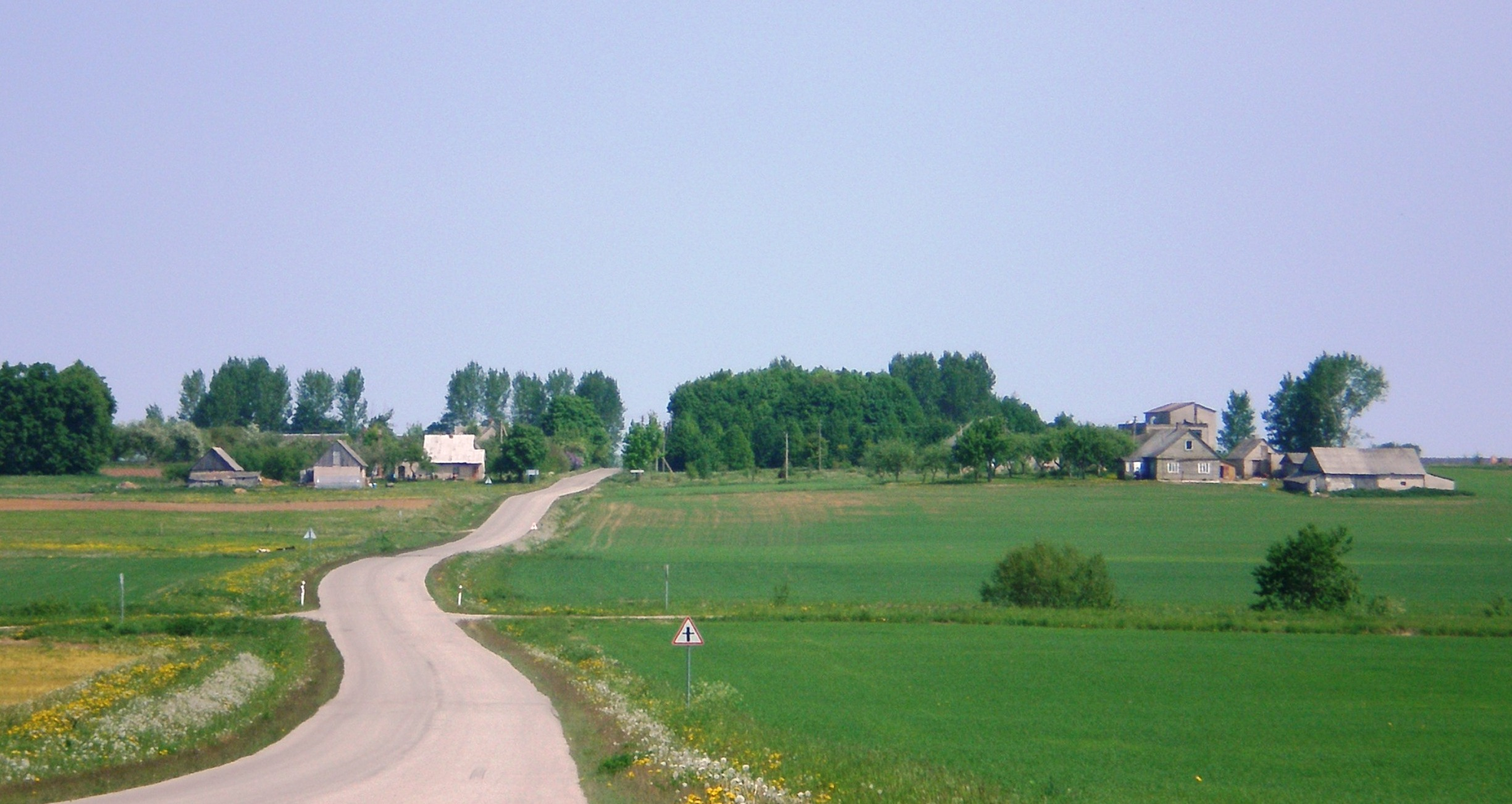

- Location in Lithuania Pališkiai (Lithuania)
- Coordinates: 55°22′41″N 23°43′08″E
- Country: Lithuania
- County: Kaunas County
- Municipality: Kėdainiai district municipality
- Eldership: Krakės Eldership

Population (2011)
  - Total: 71
- Time zone: UTC+2 (EET)
  - Summer (DST): UTC+3 (EEST)

Pališkiai (formerly Russian: Палишки, Polish: Paliszki, Piliszki, Poliszki) is a village in Kėdainiai district municipality, in Kaunas County, in central Lithuania. According to the 2011 census, the village had a population of 71 people. It is located 3.5 kilometres (2.2 mi) from Krakės, just south from Meironiškiai. Pališkiai de facto is part of Meironiškiai village.

At the beginning of the 20th century Pališkiai was an okolica.

== Demography ==
Historical population

Year	Pop.	±% p.a.
1902	122	—
1923	75	−2.29%
1959	139	+1.73%
1970	152	+0.82%

Year	Pop.	±% p.a.
1979	126	−2.06%
1989	137	+0.84%
2001	127	−0.63%
2011	71	−5.65%

Source: 1902, 1923, 1959 & 1970, 1979, 1989, 2001, 2011

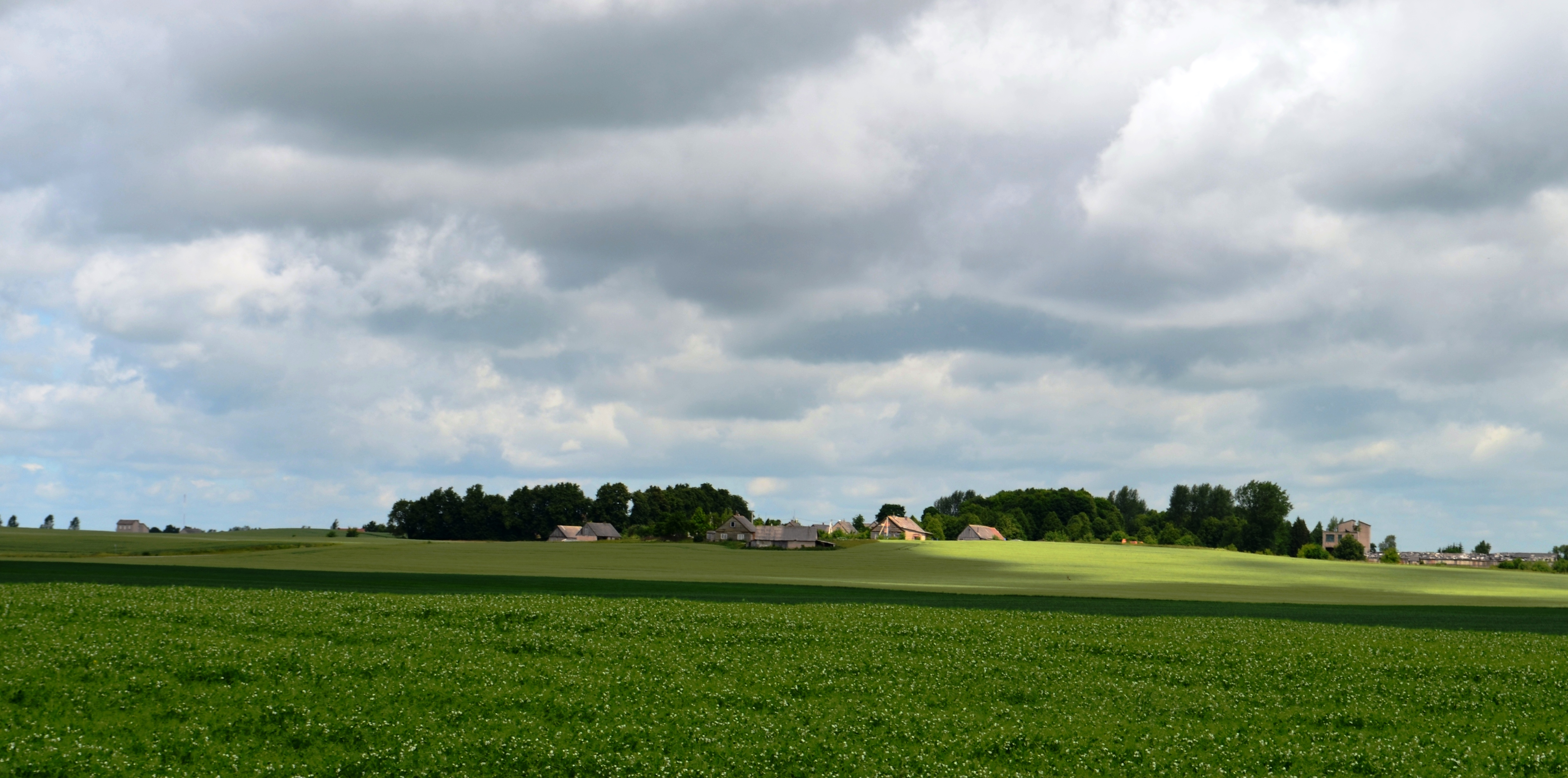
Pališkiai from the southeast
