= Jaugilka =

- Village
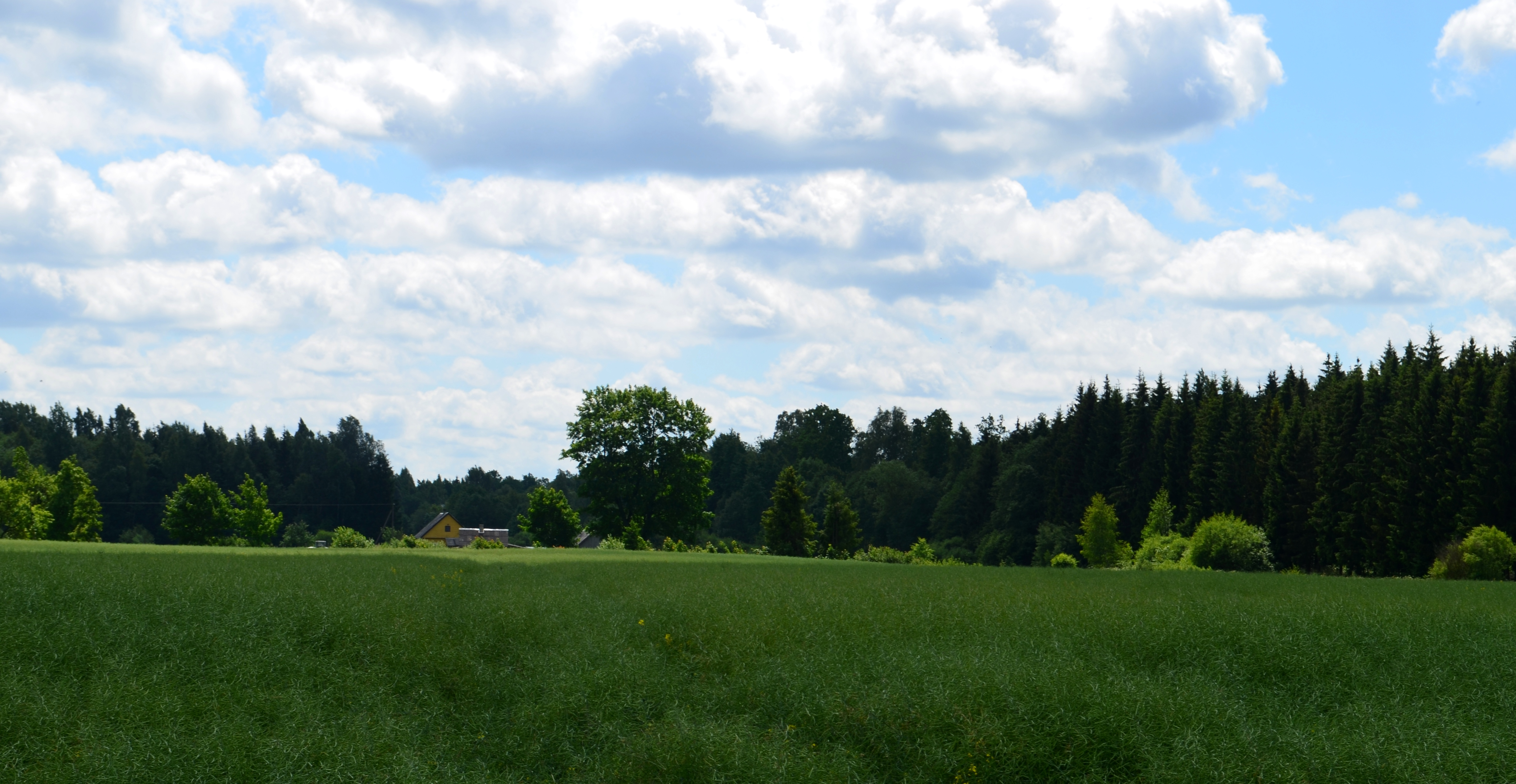

- Location in Lithuania Jaugilka (Lithuania)
- Coordinates: 55°25′30″N 23°45′22″E
- Country: Lithuania
- County: Kaunas County
- Municipality: Kėdainiai district municipality
- Eldership: Krakės Eldership

Population (2011)
  - Total: 1
- Time zone: UTC+2 (EET)
  - Summer (DST): UTC+3 (EEST)

Jaugilka (Jaugelka, Jaugėlka) is a village in Kėdainiai district municipality in Kaunas County, in central Lithuania. According to the 2011 census, the village had a population of 1. It is located 3 kilometres (1.9 mi) from Krakės, by the Jaugila river (and its tributaries the Landė and the Šernupis), close to the Krakės-Dotnuva Forest.

There are a wooden cross and a monumental stone.

== Demography ==
Historical population

Year	Pop.	±% p.a.
1923	111	—
1959	77	−1.01%
1970	66	−1.39%
1979	10	−18.92%

Year	Pop.	±% p.a.
1989	5	−6.70%
2001	1	−12.55%
2011	1	+0.00%

Source: 1902, 1923, 1959 & 1970, 1979, 1989, 2001, 2011

== Images ==
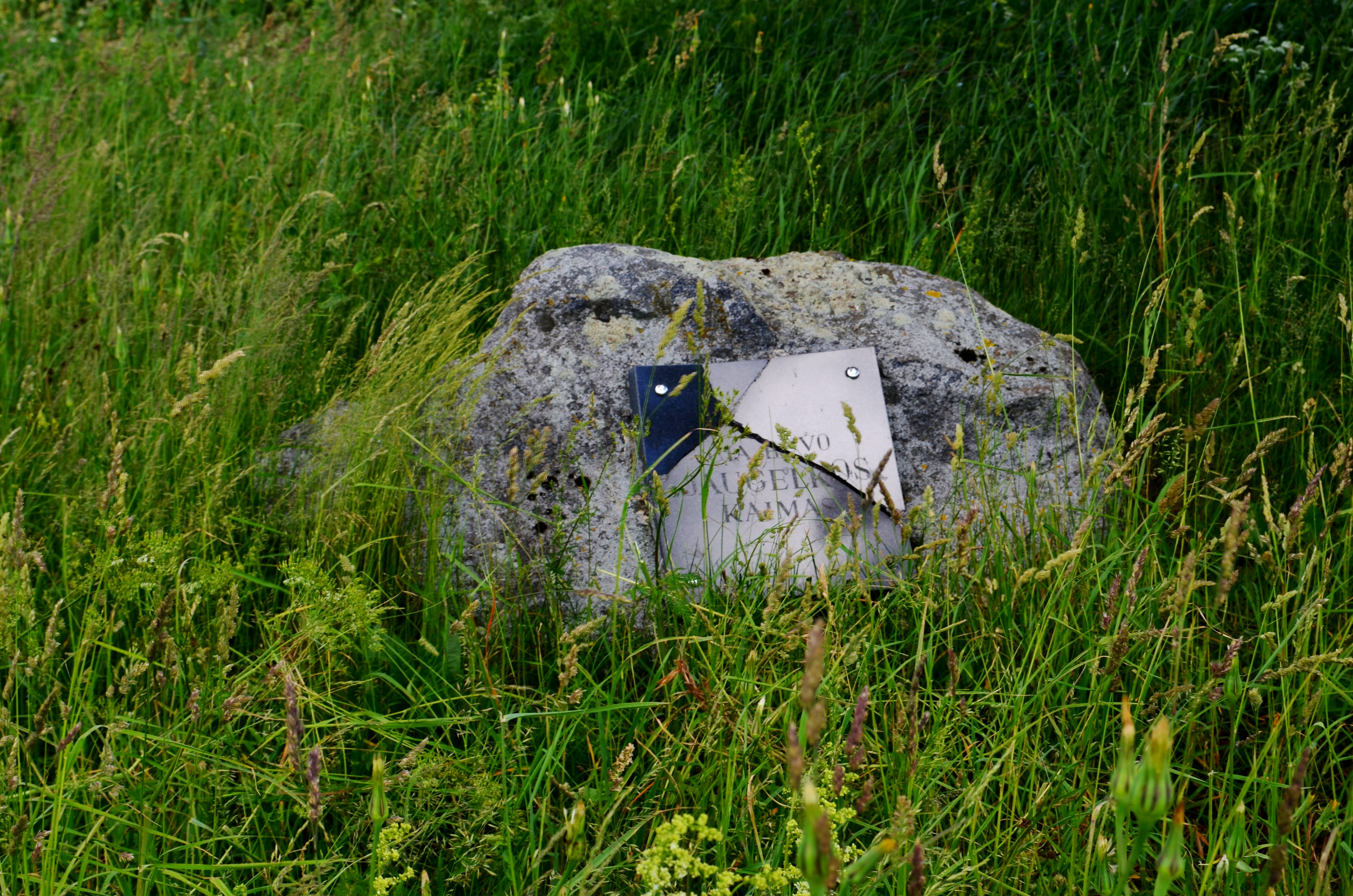
The stone with inscription: "Here was Jaugelka village"

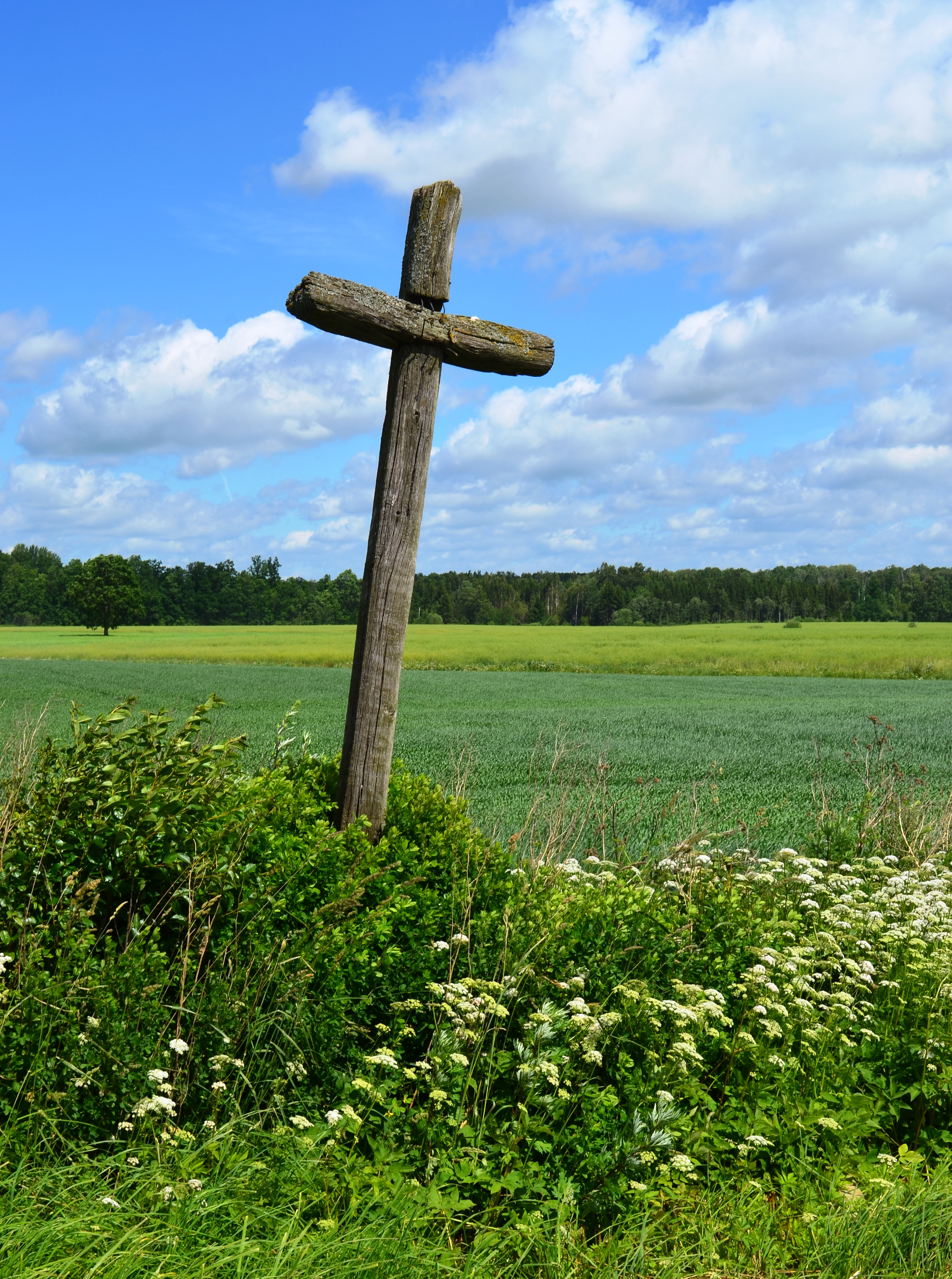
A wooden cross
