= Pališkėliai =

- Village
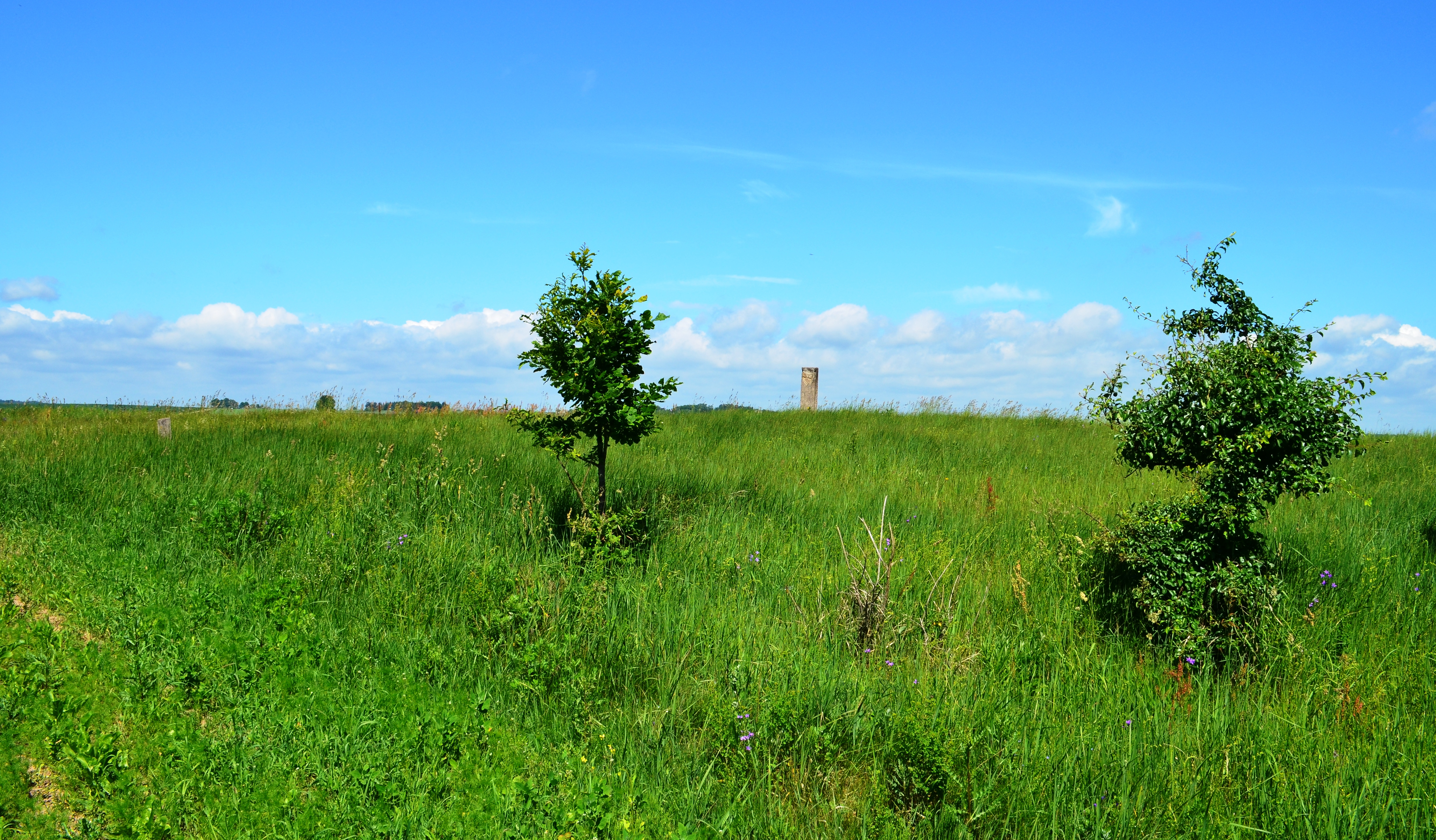

- Location in Lithuania Pališkėliai (Lithuania)
- Coordinates: 55°21′17″N 23°43′14″E
- Country: Lithuania
- County: Kaunas County
- Municipality: Kėdainiai district municipality
- Eldership: Krakės Eldership

Population (2011)
  - Total: 0
- Time zone: UTC+2 (EET)
  - Summer (DST): UTC+3 (EEST)

Pališkėliai (formerly Russian: Палишкели) is a village in Kėdainiai district municipality, in Kaunas County, in central Lithuania. According to the 2011 census, the village was uninhabited. It is located 4 kilometres (2.5 mi) from Pajieslys, by the Smilgaitis river, nearby the Josvainiai Forest. There is a place of a former cemetery (a heritage object).

== Demography ==
Historical population

Year	Pop.	±% p.a.
1902	70	—
1923	40	−2.63%
1959	37	−0.22%
1970	5	−16.64%

Year	Pop.	±% p.a.
1979	0	−100.00%
1989	0	0.00%
2001	0	0.00%
2011	0	0.00%

Source: 1902, 1923, 1959 & 1970, 1979, 1989, 2001, 2011
