= Paropėlis =

- Village
- Location in Lithuania Paropėlis (Lithuania)
- Coordinates: 55°22′12″N 23°39′30″E
- Country: Lithuania
- County: Kaunas County
- Municipality: Kėdainiai district municipality
- Eldership: Krakės Eldership

Population (2011)
  - Total: 0
- Time zone: UTC+2 (EET)
  - Summer (DST): UTC+3 (EEST)

Paropėlis (formerly Russian: Поропи, Polish: Poropie) is a village in Kėdainiai district municipality, in Kaunas County, in central Lithuania. According to the 2011 census, the village was uninhabited. It is located 3 kilometres (1.9 mi) from Pajieslys, by the Šušvė river and its tributary the Paropėlė.

At the beginning of the 20th century there was Paropėlė manor of the Kondratai family.

== Demography ==
Historical population

Year	Pop.	±% p.a.
1902	9	—
1923	10	+0.50%
1959	36	+3.62%
1970	5	−16.43%

Year	Pop.	±% p.a.
1979	0	−100.00%
1989	0	0.00%
2001	0	0.00%
2011	0	0.00%

Source: 1902, 1923, 1959 & 1970, 1979, 1989, 2001, 2011
