= Rėguliai =

- Village
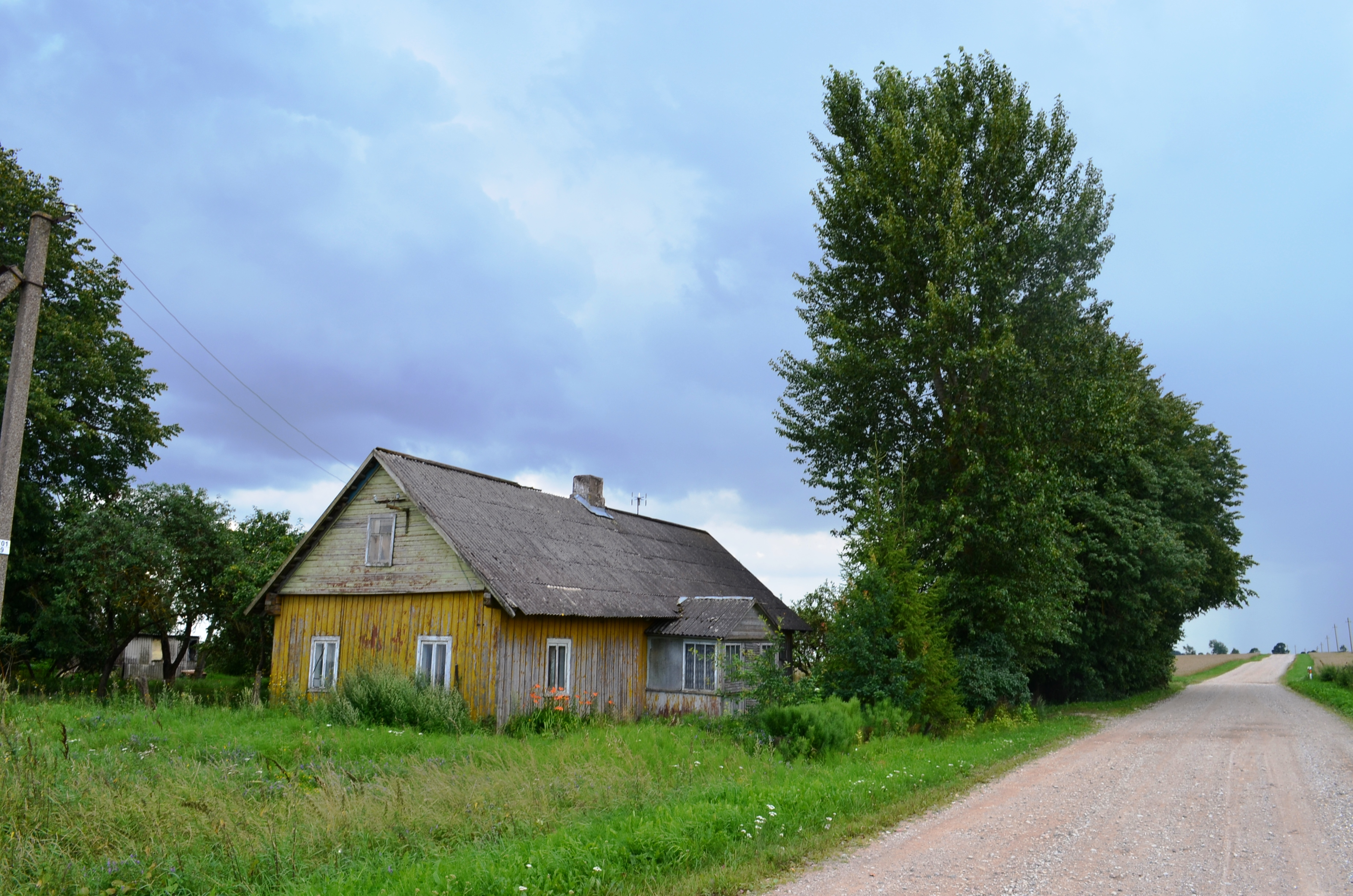

- Location in Lithuania Rėguliai (Lithuania)
- Coordinates: 55°24′00″N 23°39′50″E
- Country: Lithuania
- County: Kaunas County
- Municipality: Kėdainiai district municipality
- Eldership: Krakės Eldership

Population (2011)
  - Total: 6
- Time zone: UTC+2 (EET)
  - Summer (DST): UTC+3 (EEST)

Rėguliai (formerly Russian: Регуле, Polish: Regule) is a village in Kėdainiai district municipality, in Kaunas County, in central Lithuania. According to the 2011 census, the village had a population of 6 people. It is located 1 kilometre (0.62 mi) from Pašušvys, by the Digraitė rivulet. There are former farms, a water tower.

At the end of the 19th century Rėguliai was a village and zaścianek in Krakės volost, a property of the Daugirdai family.

== Demography ==
Historical population

Year	Pop.	±% p.a.
1902	34	—
1923	40	+0.78%
1959	95	+2.43%
1970	73	−2.37%

Year	Pop.	±% p.a.
1979	23	−12.04%
1989	14	−4.84%
2001	17	+1.63%
2011	6	−9.89%

Source: 1902, 1923, 1959 & 1970, 1979, 1989, 2001, 2011
