= Žitaičiai =

- Village
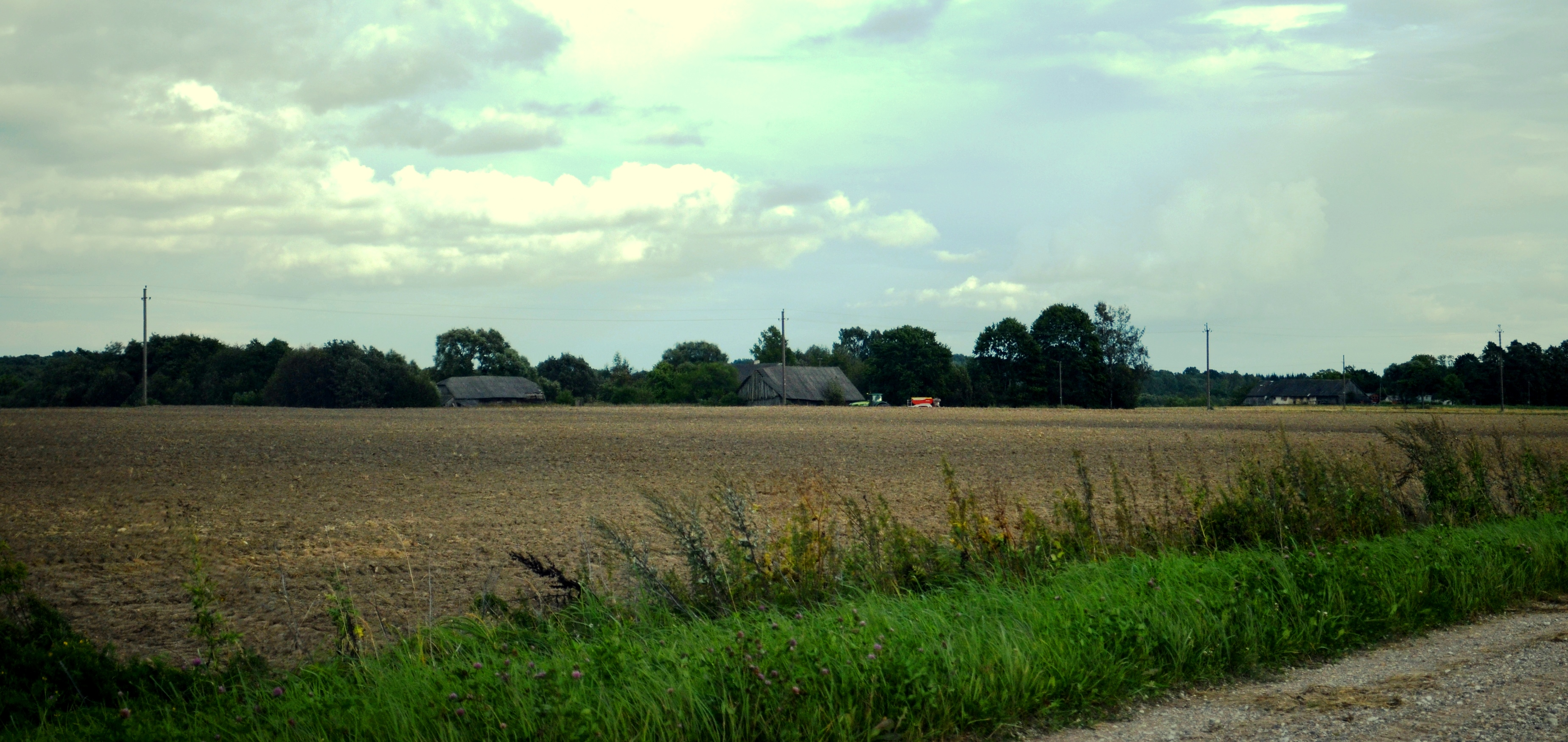

- Location in Lithuania Žitaičiai (Lithuania)
- Coordinates: 55°23′38″N 23°38′31″E
- Country: Lithuania
- County: Kaunas County
- Municipality: Kėdainiai district municipality
- Eldership: Krakės Eldership

Population (2011)
  - Total: 1
- Time zone: UTC+2 (EET)
  - Summer (DST): UTC+3 (EEST)

Žitaičiai (formerly Russian: Житаици, Polish: Żytajcie) is a village in Kėdainiai district municipality, in Kaunas County, in central Lithuania. According to the 2011 census, the village had a population of 1 person. It is located 1 kilometre (0.62 mi) from Pašušvys, on the right bank of the Šušvė river.

There was a folwark before the Soviet era.

== Demography ==
Historical population

Year	Pop.	±% p.a.
1902	18	—
1923	34	+3.07%
1959	32	−0.17%
1970	21	−3.76%

Year	Pop.	±% p.a.
1979	24	+1.49%
1989	8	−10.40%
2001	9	+0.99%
2011	1	−19.73%

Source: 1902, 1923, 1959 & 1970, 1979, 1989, 2001, 2011
