= Mikniūnai, Kėdainiai =

Mikniūnai
- Village
- Location in Lithuania Mikniūnai (Lithuania)
- Coordinates: 55°27′40″N 23°41′0″E
- Country: Lithuania
- County: Kaunas County
- Municipality: Kėdainiai district municipality
- Eldership: Krakės Eldership

Population (2011)
  - Total: 0
- Time zone: UTC+2 (EET)
  - Summer (DST): UTC+3 (EEST)

Mikniūnai (formerly Russian: Михнюны, Polish: Michniuny) is a village in Kėdainiai district municipality, in Kaunas County, in central Lithuania. According to the 2011 census, the village was uninhabited. It is located 2 kilometres (1.2 mi) from Barkūniškis.

At the beginning of the 20th century Mikniūnai was an estate of the Burbos family.

== Demography ==
Historical population

Year	Pop.	±% p.a.
1902	19	—
1923	25	+1.32%
1959	24	−0.11%
1970	12	−6.11%

Year	Pop.	±% p.a.
1979	3	−14.28%
1989	0	−100.00%
2001	0	0.00%
2011	0	0.00%

Source: 1902, 1923, 1959 & 1970, 1979, 1989, 2001, 2011
