= Tauginiškiai =

- Village
- Location in Lithuania Tauginiškiai (Lithuania)
- Coordinates: 55°22′13″N 23°40′48″E
- Country: Lithuania
- County: Kaunas County
- Municipality: Kėdainiai district municipality
- Eldership: Krakės Eldership

Population (2011)
  - Total: 0
- Time zone: UTC+2 (EET)
  - Summer (DST): UTC+3 (EEST)

Tauginiškiai (formerly Russian: Товгенишки, Polish: Towgianiszki, Towgieniszki) is a village in Kėdainiai district municipality, in Kaunas County, in central Lithuania. According to the 2011 census, the village was uninhabited. It is located 2 kilometres (1.2 mi) from Pajieslys, by the Paropėlė rivulet.

== History ==
At the end of the 19th century there was a manor of the Račkauskai family.

== Demography ==
Historical population

Year	Pop.	±% p.a.
1902	18	—
1923	10	−2.76%
1959	15	+1.13%
1970	5	−9.50%

Year	Pop.	±% p.a.
1979	0	−100.00%
1989	0	0.00%
2001	0	0.00%
2011	0	0.00%

Source: 1902, 1923, 1959 & 1970, 1979, 1989, 2001, 2011
