= Žalioji, Kėdainiai =

Žalioji
- Village
- Location in Lithuania Žalioji (Lithuania)
- Coordinates: 55°26′18″N 23°37′10″E
- Country: Lithuania
- County: Kaunas County
- Municipality: Kėdainiai district municipality
- Eldership: Krakės Eldership

Population (2011)
  - Total: 0
- Time zone: UTC+2 (EET)
  - Summer (DST): UTC+3 (EEST)

Žalioji ('the green one', formerly Zelionka, Russian: Зеленка, Polish: Zielonka) is a village in Kėdainiai district municipality, in Kaunas County, in central Lithuania. According to the 2011 census, the village was uninhabited. It is located 2 kilometres (1.2 mi) from Ažytėnai, by the Ažynas river, in the Lapkalnys-Paliepiai Forest.

== Demography ==
Historical population

Year	Pop.	±% p.a.
1902	11	—
1923	5	−3.68%
1959	3	−1.41%
1970	2	−3.62%

Year	Pop.	±% p.a.
1979	0	−100.00%
1989	0	0.00%
2001	0	0.00%
2011	0	0.00%

Source: 1902, 1923, 1959 & 1970, 1979, 1989, 2001, 2011
