= Plaukiai =

- Village
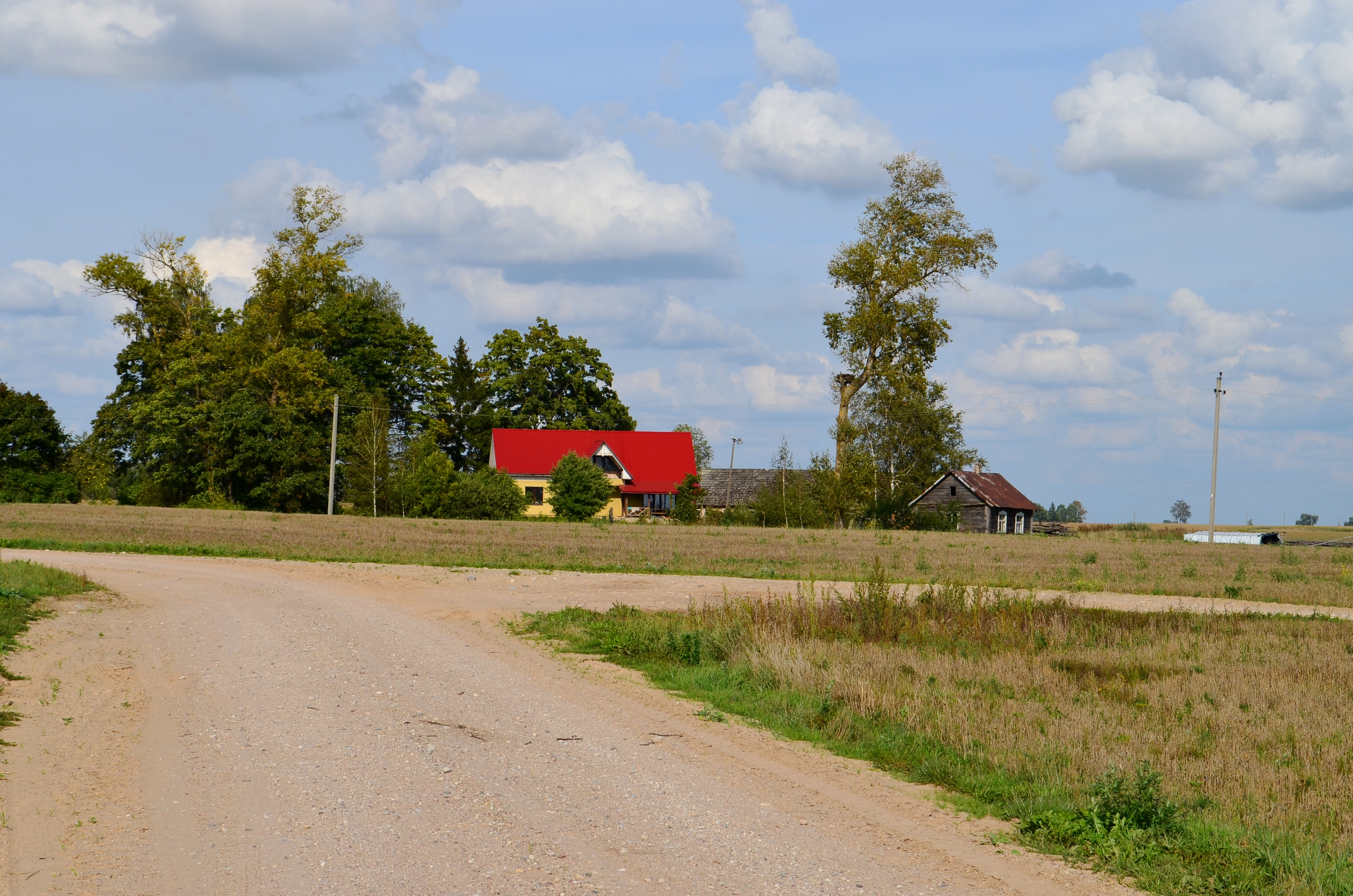

- Location in Lithuania Plaukiai (Lithuania)
- Coordinates: 55°28′41″N 23°41′38″E
- Country: Lithuania
- County: Kaunas County
- Municipality: Kėdainiai district municipality
- Eldership: Krakės Eldership

Population (2011)
  - Total: 4
- Time zone: UTC+2 (EET)
  - Summer (DST): UTC+3 (EEST)

Plaukiai (formerly Russian: Плавки, Polish: Pławki) is a village in Kėdainiai district municipality, in Kaunas County, in central Lithuania. According to the 2011 census, the village had a population of 4 people. It is located 3 kilometres (1.9 mi) from Barkūniškis, by the Vinkšnupis rivulet. An ancient cemetery place is located in the village (culture heritage object).

== Demography ==
Historical population

Year	Pop.	±% p.a.
1902	149	—
1923	127	−0.76%
1959	115	−0.28%
1970	92	−2.01%

Year	Pop.	±% p.a.
1979	45	−7.64%
1989	4	−21.50%
2001	6	+3.44%
2011	4	−3.97%

Source: 1902, 1923, 1959 & 1970, 1979, 1989, 2001, 2011
