= Apirubiai =

- Village
- Location in Lithuania Apirubiai (Lithuania)
- Coordinates: 55°21′10″N 23°37′50″E
- Country: Lithuania
- County: Kaunas County
- Municipality: Kėdainiai district municipality
- Eldership: Krakės Eldership

Population (2011)
  - Total: 0
- Time zone: UTC+2 (EET)
  - Summer (DST): UTC+3 (EEST)

Apirubiai ('whereabouts, site', formerly Russian: Апирубясъ) is a village in Kėdainiai district municipality, in Kaunas County, in central Lithuania. According to the 2011 census, the village was uninhabited. It is located 3 kilometres (1.9 mi) from Pajieslys, on the boundary of Raseiniai District Municipality.

== Demography ==
Historical population

Year	Pop.	±% p.a.
1902	8	—
1923	29	+6.32%
1959	30	+0.09%
1970	24	−2.01%

Year	Pop.	±% p.a.
1979	18	−3.15%
1989	0	−100.00%
2001	0	0.00%
2011	0	0.00%

Source: 1902, 1923, 1959 & 1970, 1979, 1989, 2001, 2011
