= Aukštuoliukai, Kėdainiai =

Aukštuoliukai
- Village
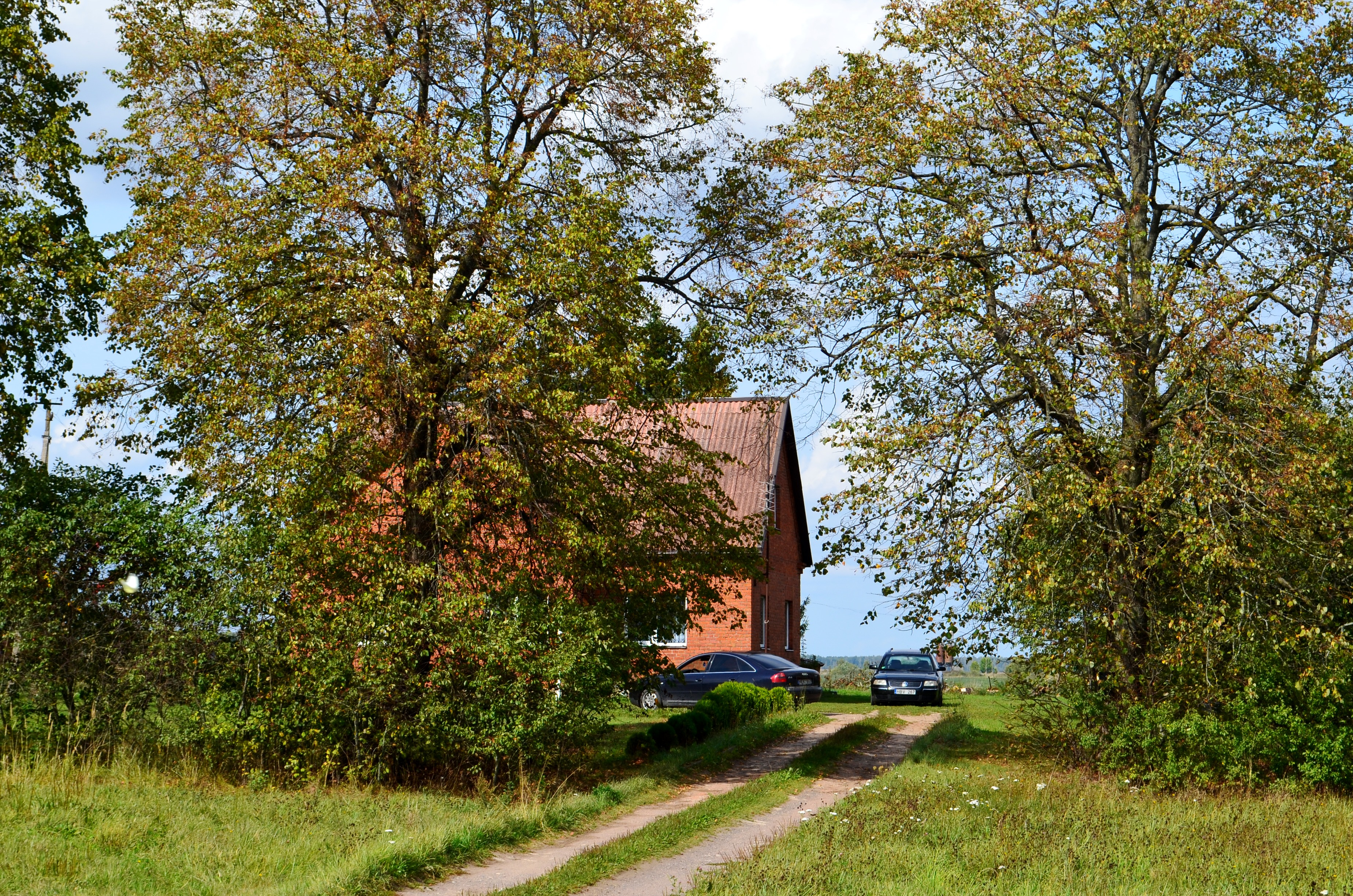

- Location in Lithuania Aukštuoliukai (Lithuania)
- Coordinates: 55°24′22″N 23°41′38″E
- Country: Lithuania
- County: Kaunas County
- Municipality: Kėdainiai district municipality
- Eldership: Krakės Eldership

Population (2011)
  - Total: 3
- Time zone: UTC+2 (EET)
  - Summer (DST): UTC+3 (EEST)

Aukštuoliukai (formerly Polish: Auksztoluki, Russian: Аукштолюки) is a village in Kėdainiai district municipality, in Kaunas County, in central Lithuania. According to the 2011 census, the village had a population of 3 people. It is located 2 kilometres (1.2 mi) from Krakės, nearby the Smilgaitis river.

At the beginning of the 20th century there were two Aukštuoliukai estates in Krakės volost.

== Demography ==
Historical population

Year	Pop.	±% p.a.
1902	18	—
1923	72	+6.82%
1959	49	−1.06%
1970	37	−2.52%

Year	Pop.	±% p.a.
1979	16	−8.89%
1989	1	−24.21%
2001	0	−100.00%
2011	3	—

Source: 1902, 1923, 1959 & 1970, 1979, 1989, 2001, 2011
