= Degimai =

Degimai ('burnt places' in Lithuanian) could refer to several Lithuanian villages:

- Degimai, Josvainiai, in Josvainiai Eldership of Kėdainiai District Municipality
- Degimai, Krakės, in Krakės Eldership of Kėdainiai District Municipality
- Degimai, Kretinga, in Kretinga District Municipality
- Degimai, Mažeikiai, in Mažeikiai District Municipality
- Degimai, Naujoji Ūta, in Naujoji Ūta Eldership of Prienai District Municipality
- Degimai, Veiveriai, in Veiveriai Eldership of Prienai District Municipality
- Degimai, Šilalė, in Šilalė District Municipality.
