= Gudaičiai, Kėdainiai =

Gudaičiai
- Village
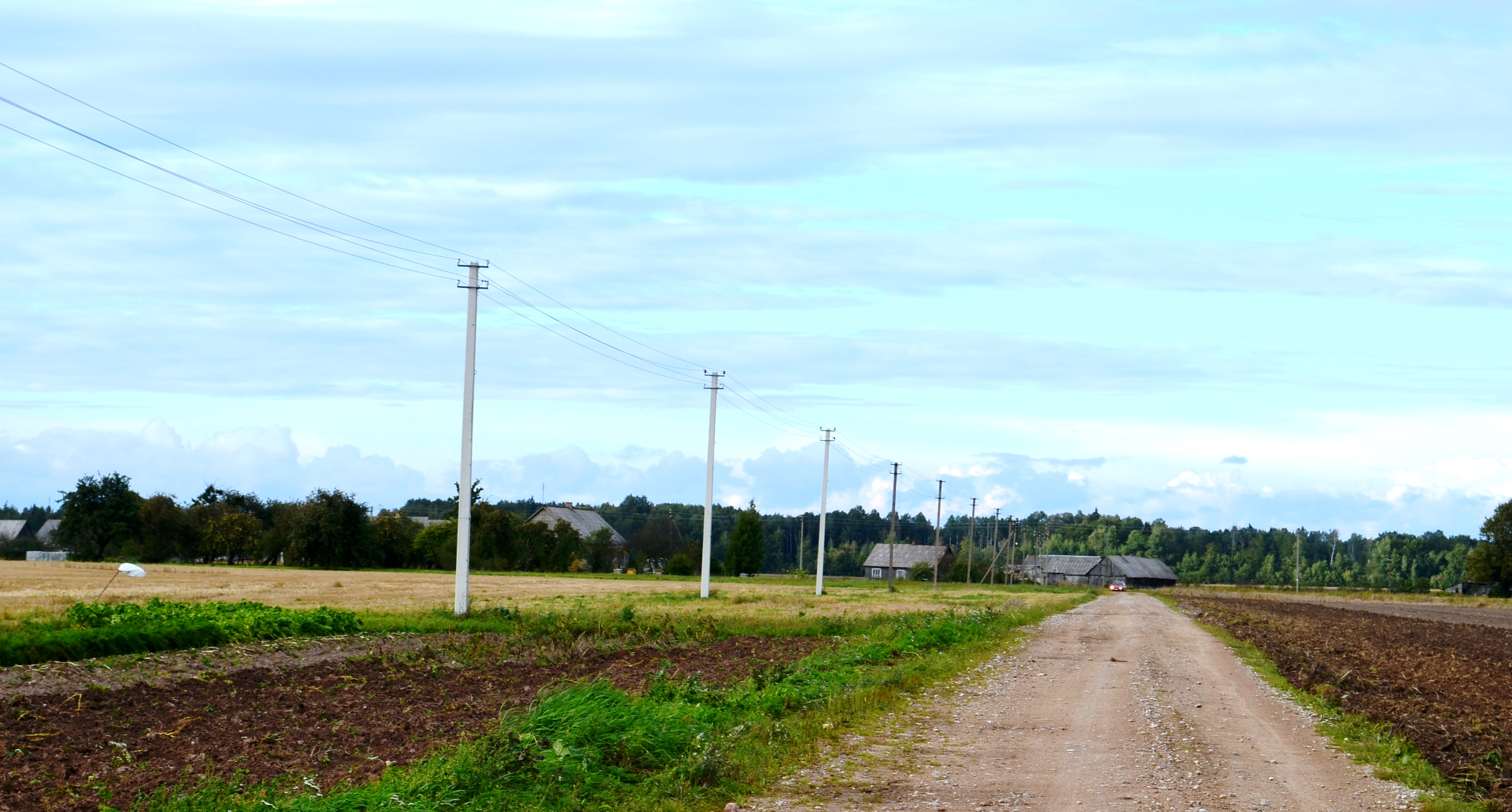

- Location in Lithuania Gudaičiai (Lithuania)
- Coordinates: 55°25′30″N 23°37′59″E
- Country: Lithuania
- County: Kaunas County
- Municipality: Kėdainiai district municipality
- Eldership: Krakės Eldership

Population (2011)
  - Total: 2
- Time zone: UTC+2 (EET)
  - Summer (DST): UTC+3 (EEST)

Gudaičiai (formerly Polish: Gudajcie, Russian: Гудайцы) is a village in Kėdainiai district municipality, in Kaunas County, in central Lithuania. According to the 2011 census, the village had a population of 2 people. It is located 2 kilometres (1.2 mi) from Pašušvys, by the Dargaitė rivulet and the Skerdūmė Pond, nearby the Lapkalnys-Paliepiai Forest.

At the beginning of the 20th century Gudaičiai village belonged to the Tyszkiewicz family.

== Demography ==
Historical population

Year	Pop.	±% p.a.
1902	127	—
1923	114	−0.51%
1959	105	−0.23%
1970	72	−3.37%

Year	Pop.	±% p.a.
1979	19	−13.76%
1989	12	−4.49%
2001	6	−5.61%
2011	2	−10.40%

Source: 1902, 1923, 1959 & 1970, 1979, 1989, 2001, 2011
