= Šilainiai, Krakės =

Šilainiai
- Village
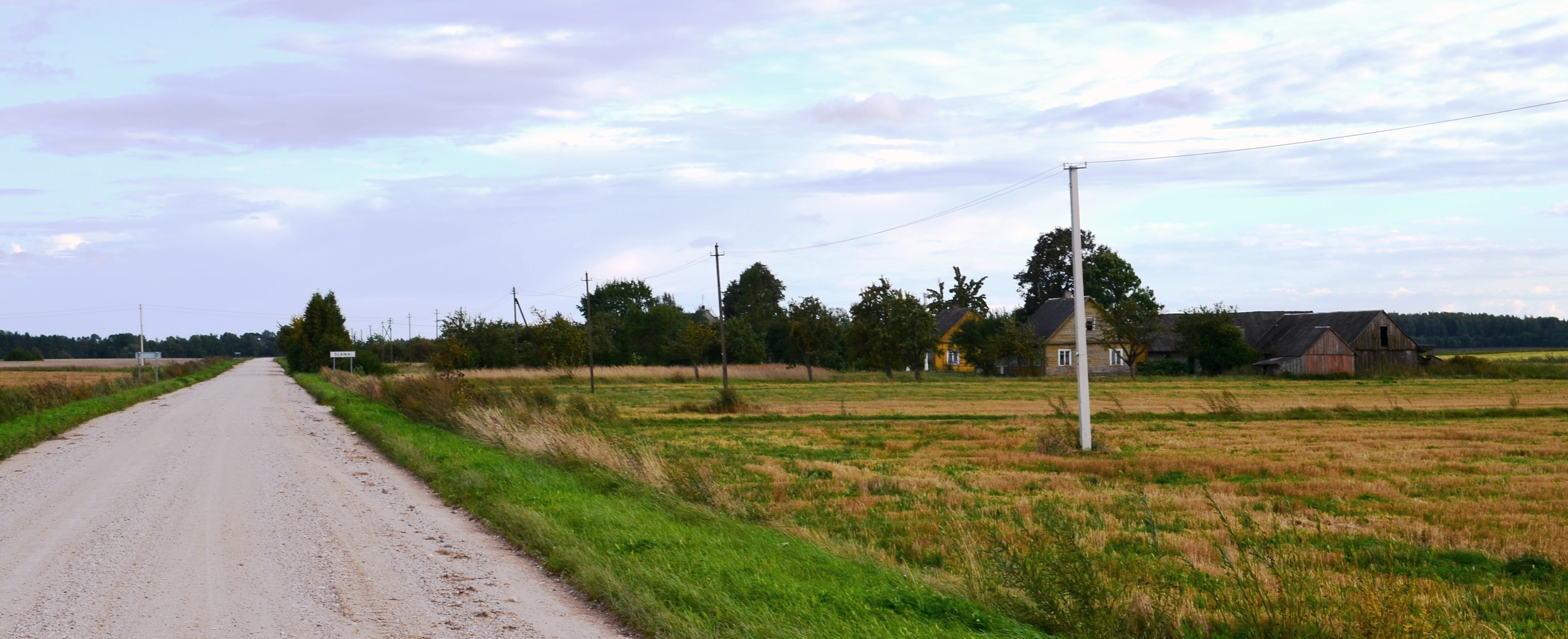

- Location in Lithuania Šilainiai (Lithuania)
- Coordinates: 55°22′59″N 23°38′20″E
- Country: Lithuania
- County: Kaunas County
- Municipality: Kėdainiai district municipality
- Eldership: Krakės Eldership

Population (2011)
  - Total: 31
- Time zone: UTC+2 (EET)
  - Summer (DST): UTC+3 (EEST)

Šilainiai (formerly Russian: Шилайни) is a village in Kėdainiai district municipality, in Kaunas County, in central Lithuania. According to the 2011 census, the village had a population of 31 people. It is located 2 kilometres (1.2 mi) from Pašušvys, between the Šušvė river and its tributary the Pečiupė, nearby the Lapkalnys-Paliepiai Forest.

== Demography ==
Historical population

Year	Pop.	±% p.a.
1902	81	—
1923	153	+3.07%
1959	117	−0.74%
1970	113	−0.32%

Year	Pop.	±% p.a.
1979	57	−7.32%
1989	32	−5.61%
2001	34	+0.51%
2011	31	−0.92%

Source: 1902, 1923, 1959 & 1970, 1979, 1989, 2001, 2011
