= Zembiškis =

- Village
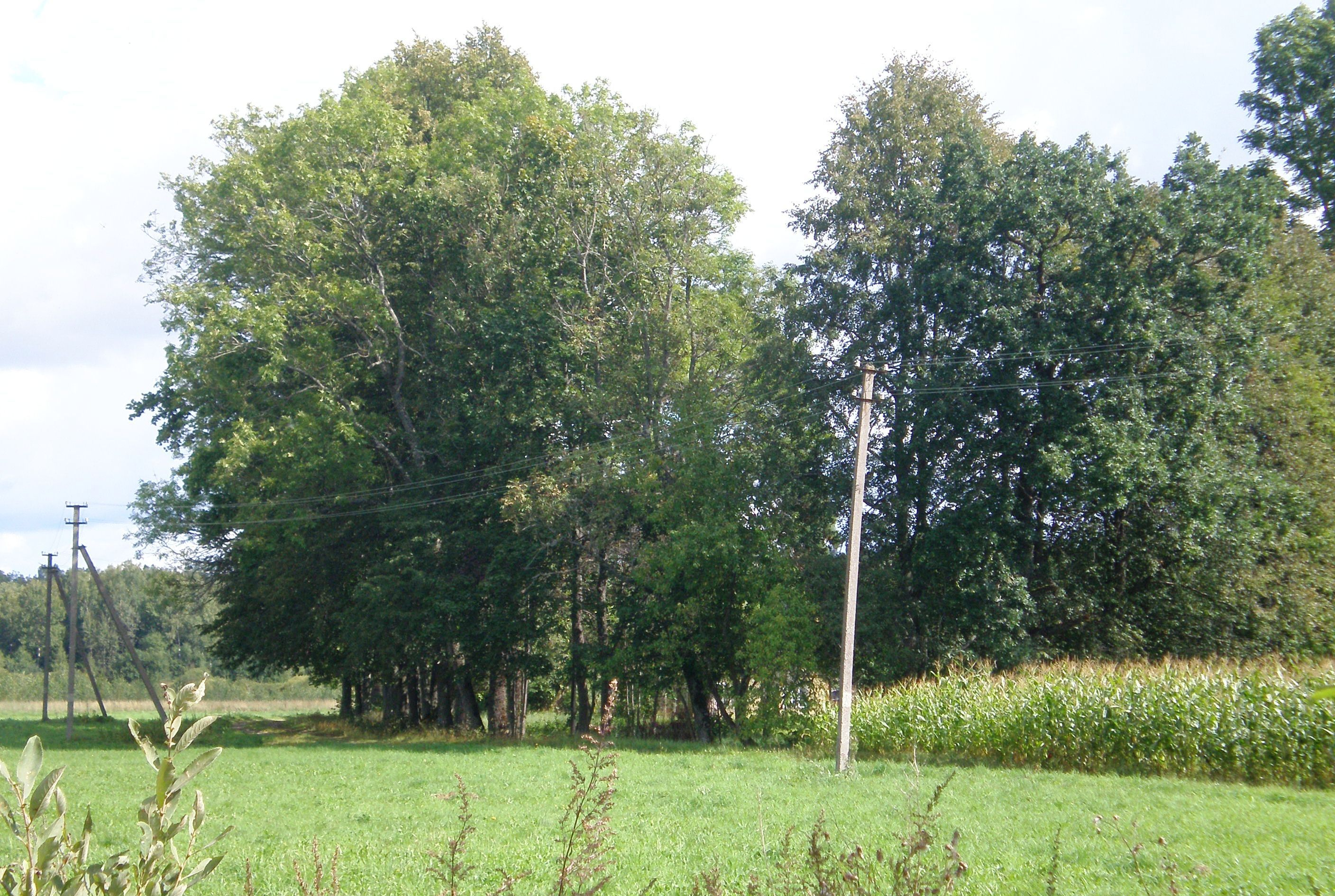

- Location in Lithuania Zembiškis (Lithuania)
- Coordinates: 55°25′08″N 23°33′39″E
- Country: Lithuania
- County: Kaunas County
- Municipality: Kėdainiai district municipality
- Eldership: Krakės Eldership

Population (2011)
  - Total: 0
- Time zone: UTC+2 (EET)
  - Summer (DST): UTC+3 (EEST)

Zembiškis (formerly Russian: Жвембишки, Polish: Zębiszki) is a village in Kėdainiai district municipality, in Kaunas County, in central Lithuania. According to the 2011 census, the village was uninhabited. It is located 5 kilometres (3.1 mi) from Pašušvys, in the midst of the Lapkalnys-Paliepiai Forest. The forest road Skirgailinė-Trankiniai goes through the village. The Zembiškis Forest Botanical Sanctuary is located here.

There was a manor in Zembiškis at the end of the 19th century.

== Demography ==
Historical population

Year	Pop.	±% p.a.
1902	13	—
1923	27	+3.54%
1959	18	−1.12%
1970	14	−2.26%

Year	Pop.	±% p.a.
1979	10	−3.67%
1989	8	−2.21%
2001	8	+0.00%
2011	0	−100.00%

Source: 1902, 1923, 1959 & 1970, 1979, 1989, 2001, 2011
