= Šulcava =

- Village
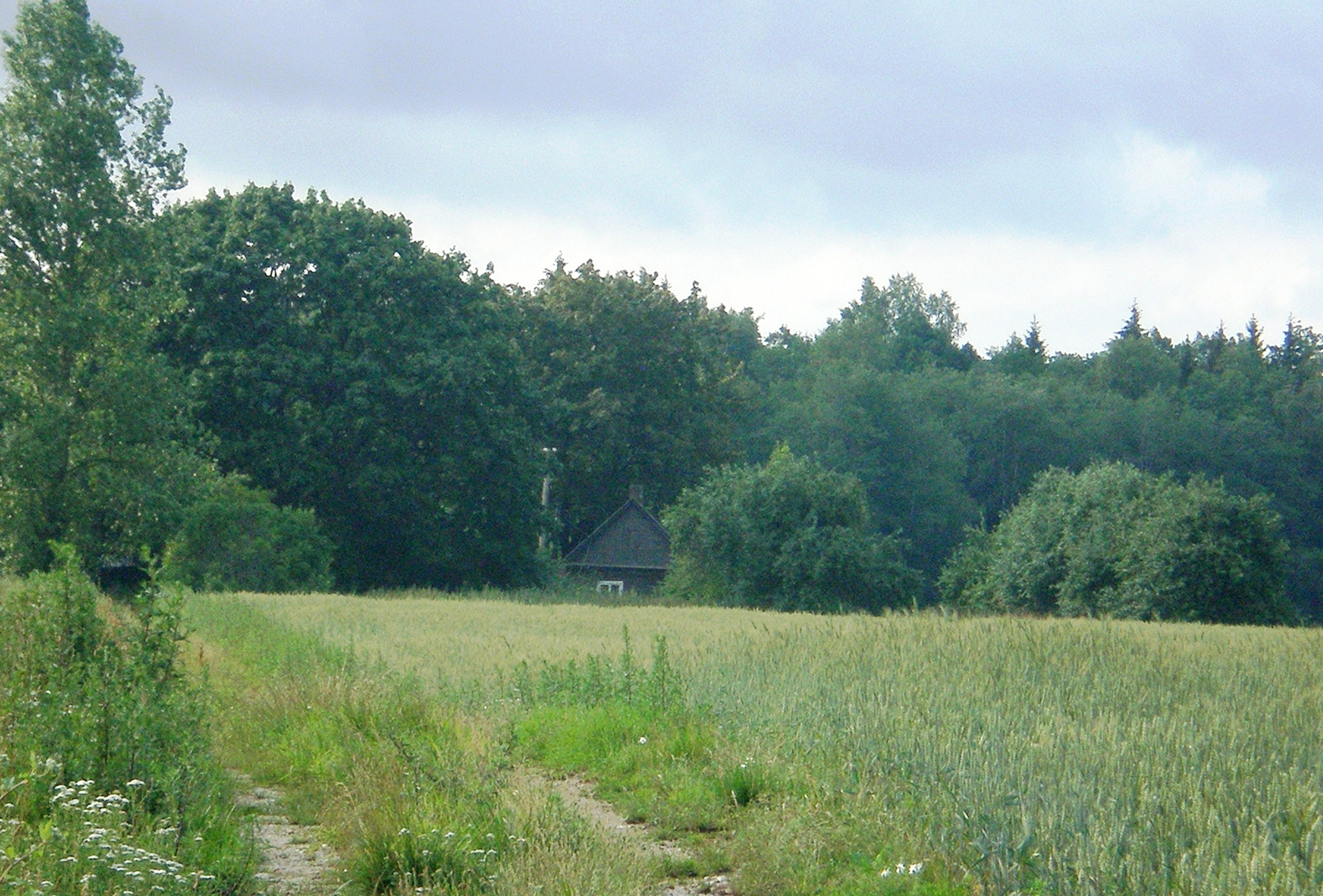

- Location in Lithuania Šulcava (Lithuania)
- Coordinates: 55°24′00″N 23°33′11″E
- Country: Lithuania
- County: Kaunas County
- Municipality: Kėdainiai district municipality
- Eldership: Krakės Eldership

Population (2011)
  - Total: 0
- Time zone: UTC+2 (EET)
  - Summer (DST): UTC+3 (EEST)

Šulcava (Šolcava, formerly Russian: Шульцово, Polish: Szulcowo) is a village in Kėdainiai district municipality, in Kaunas County, in central Lithuania. According to the 2011 census, the village was uninhabited. It is located 4 kilometres (2.5 mi) from Pašušvys, by the Krakės-Betygala road, on the edge of the Lapkalnys-Paliepiai Forest. The Gynėvė river source in nearby Šulcava.

== History ==
At the end of the 19th century there was a folwark.

== Demography ==
Historical population

| Year | Pop. | ±% p.a. |
|---|---|---|
| 1902 | 23 | — |
| 1923 | 81 | +6.18% |
| 1959 | 12 | −5.17% |
| 1970 | 5 | −7.65% |

| Year | Pop. | ±% p.a. |
|---|---|---|
| 1979 | 4 | −2.45% |
| 1989 | 3 | −2.84% |
| 2001 | 1 | −8.75% |
| 2011 | 0 | −100.00% |

Source: 1902, 1923, 1959 & 1970, 1979, 1989, 2001, 2011
