= Girvainiai, Kėdainiai =

Girvainiai
- Village
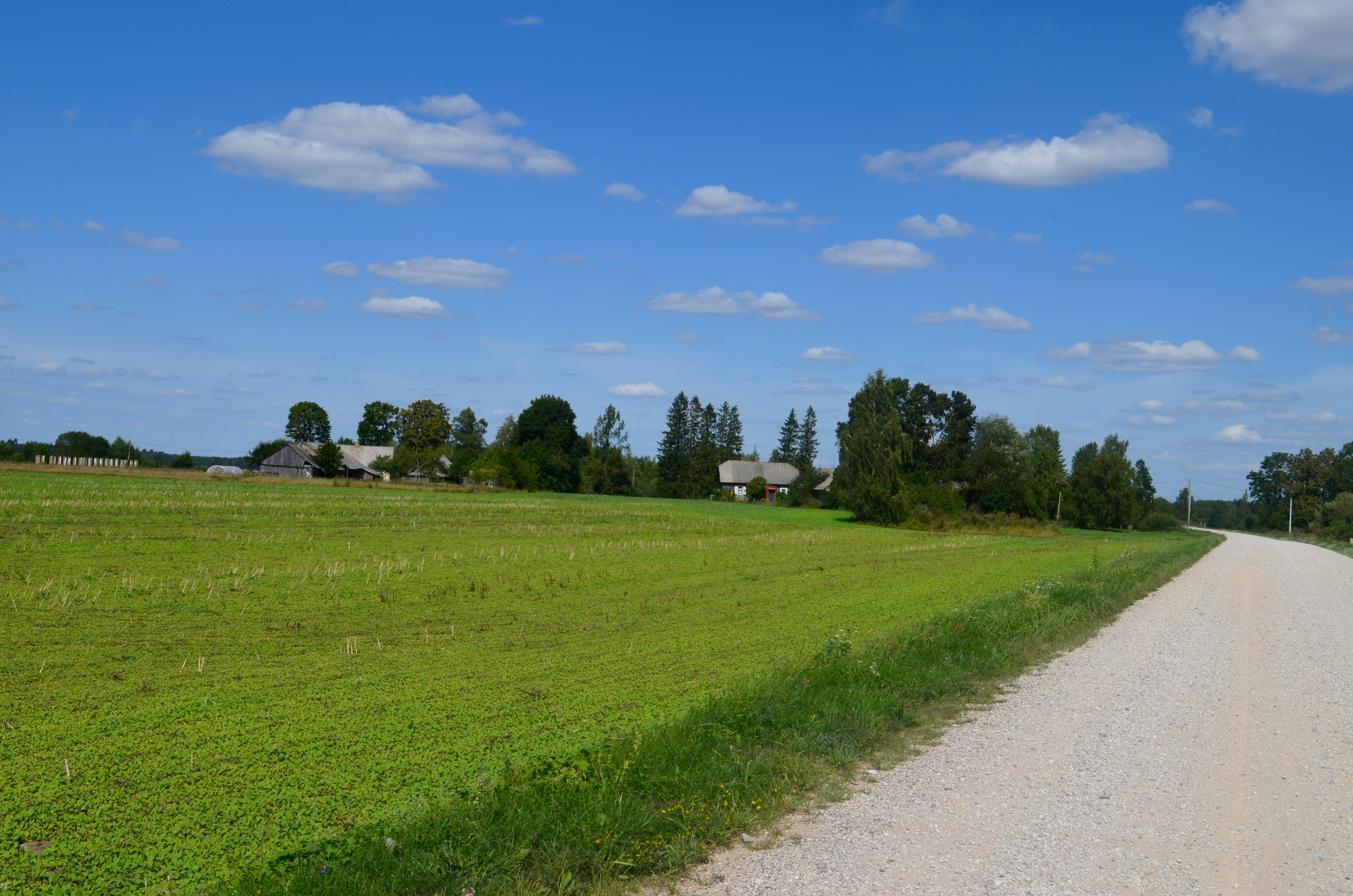

- Location in Lithuania Girvainiai (Lithuania)
- Coordinates: 55°20′38″N 23°38′49″E
- Country: Lithuania
- County: Kaunas County
- Municipality: Kėdainiai district municipality
- Eldership: Krakės Eldership

Population (2011)
  - Total: 4
- Time zone: UTC+2 (EET)
  - Summer (DST): UTC+3 (EEST)

Girvainiai (formerly Russian: Гирвайне) is a village in Kėdainiai district municipality, in Kaunas County, in central Lithuania. According to the 2011 census, the village had a population of 4 people. It is located 1 kilometre (0.62 mi) from Pajieslys, nearby the Šušvė river and its tributary Girvainė. The Lapkalnys-Paliepiai Forest is on the western boundary of the village.

== Demography ==
Historical population

Year	Pop.	±% p.a.
1902	34	—
1923	106	+5.56%
1959	90	−0.45%
1970	52	−4.86%

Year	Pop.	±% p.a.
1979	35	−4.30%
1989	21	−4.98%
2001	8	−7.73%
2011	4	−6.70%

Source: 1902, 1923, 1959 & 1970, 1979, 1989, 2001, 2011

== Images ==
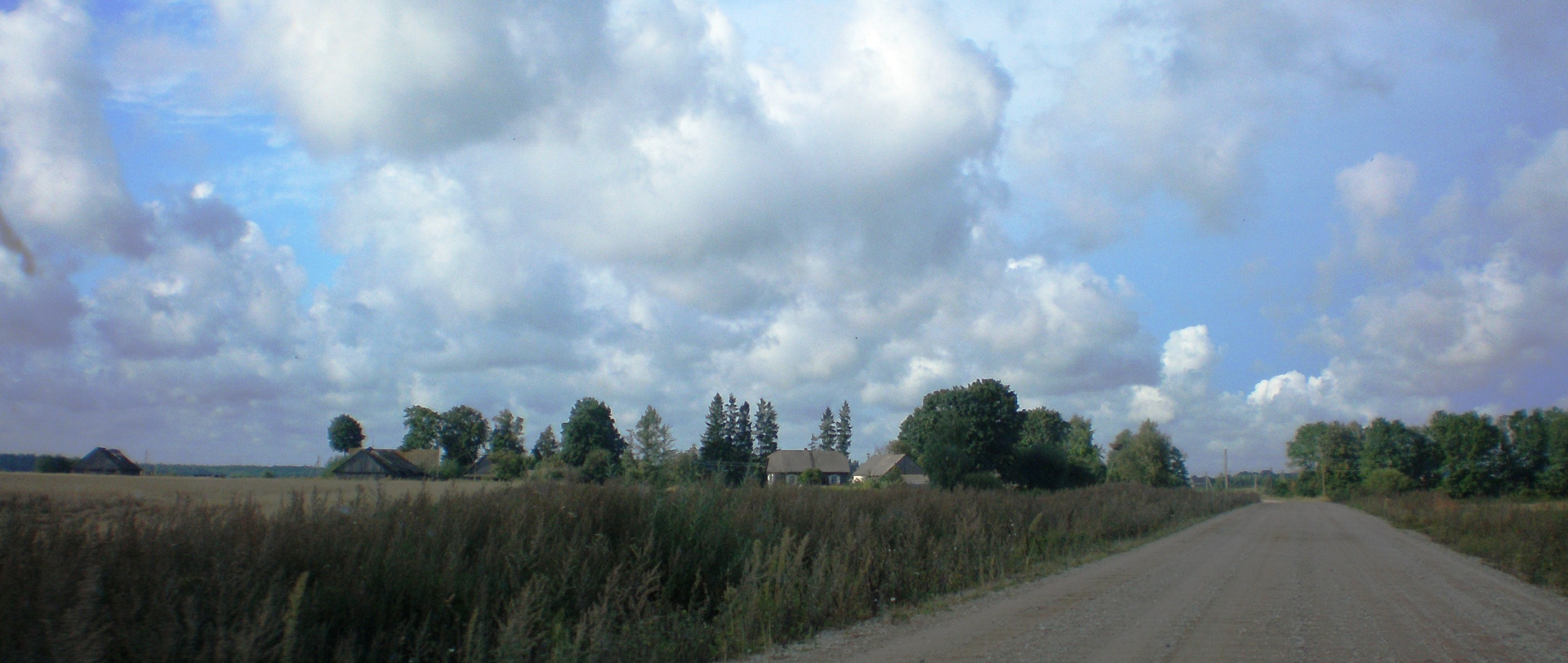
Girvainiai in 2011

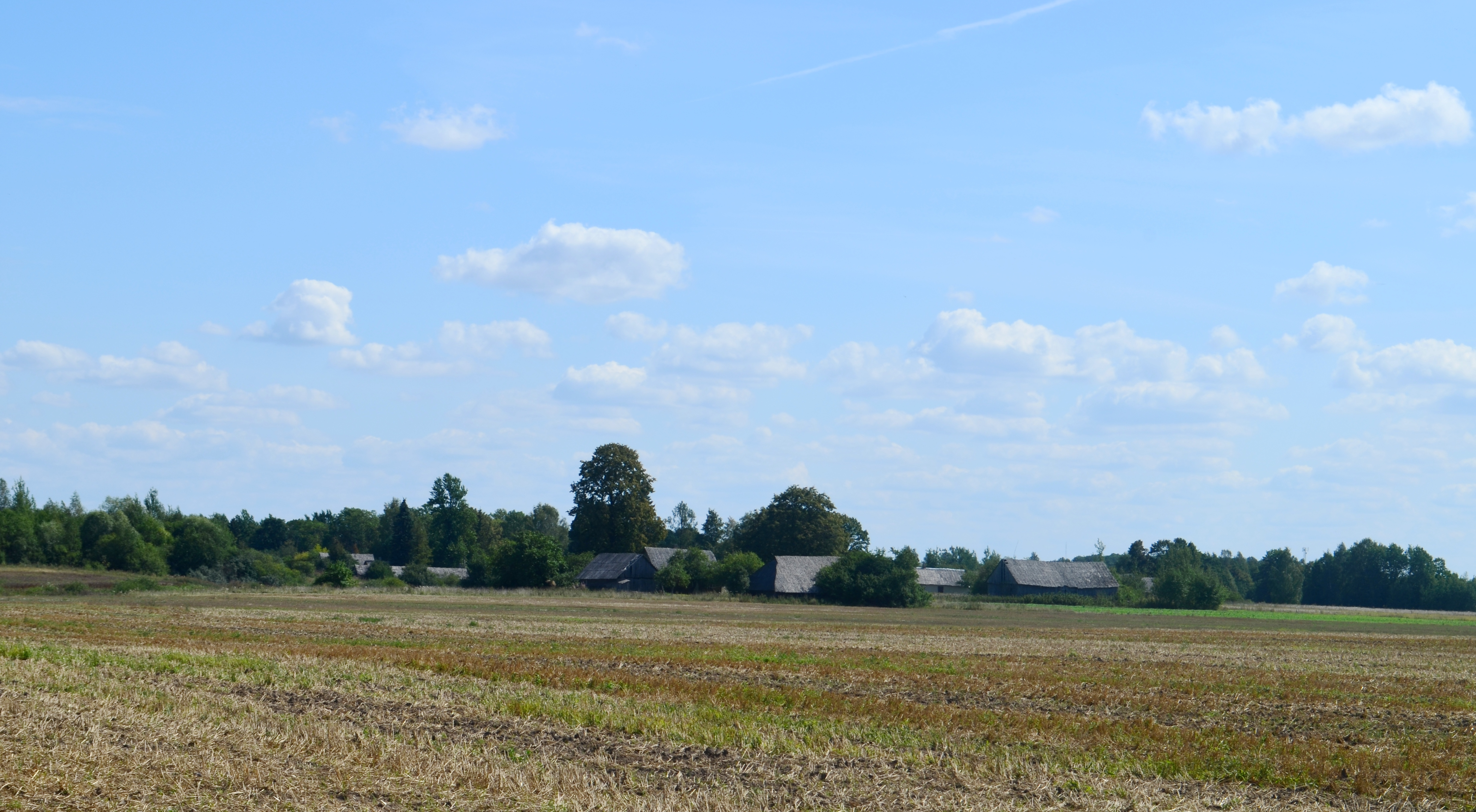
Girvainiai from the western side

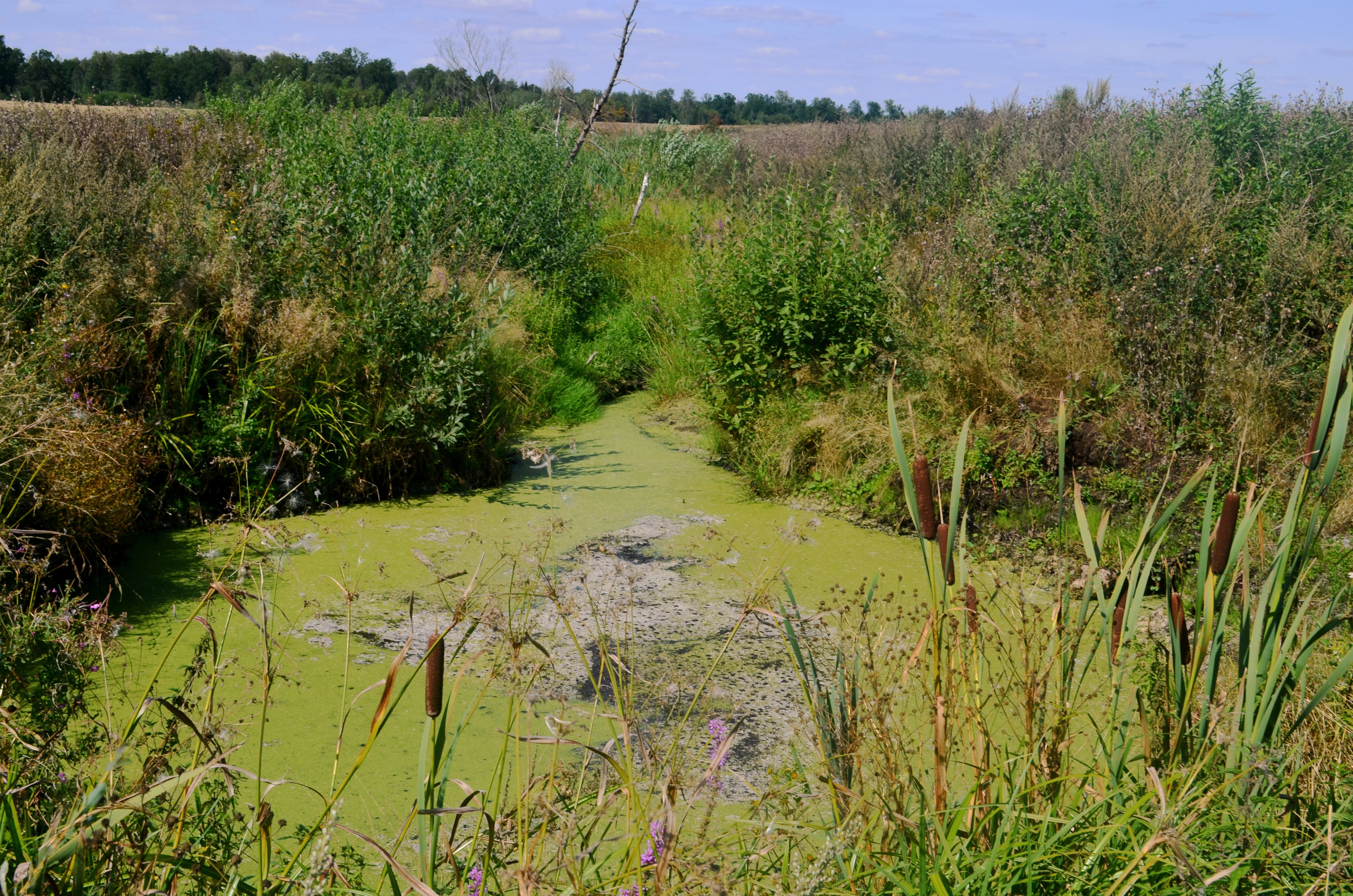
The Girvainė rivulet
