= Juodžiai, Kėdainiai =

Juodžiai
- Village
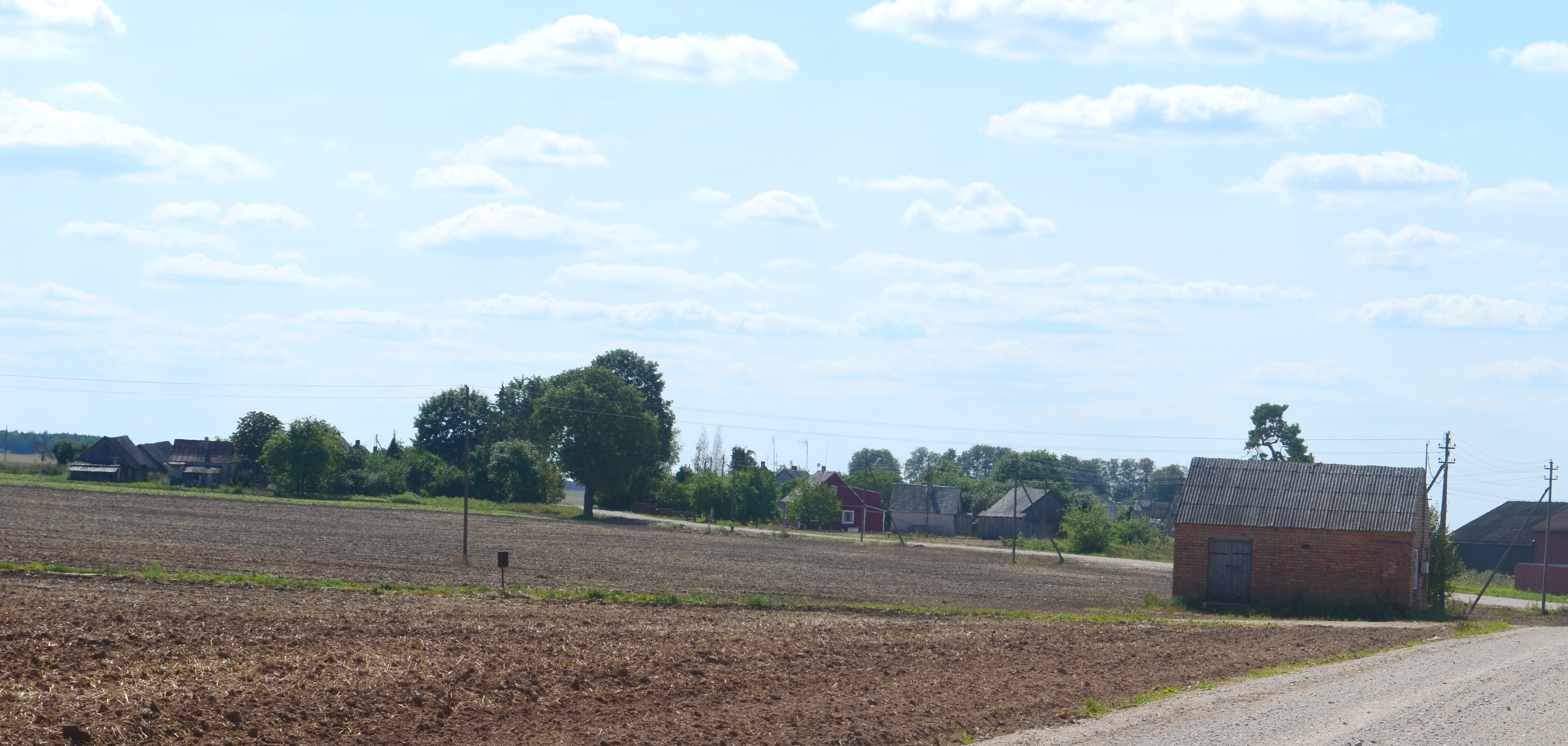

- Location in Lithuania Juodžiai (Lithuania)
- Coordinates: 55°17′20″N 23°37′59″E
- Country: Lithuania
- County: Kaunas County
- Municipality: Kėdainiai district municipality
- Eldership: Pernarava Eldership

Population (2011)
  - Total: 62
- Time zone: UTC+2 (EET)
  - Summer (DST): UTC+3 (EEST)

Juodžiai (formerly Russian: Іодзе, Polish: Jodzie) is a village in Kėdainiai district municipality, located in Kaunas County, central Lithuania. According to the 2011 census, the village had a population of 62 people. It is situated 3 kilometres (1.9 mi) from Pernarava, near the Lapkalnys-Paliepiai Forest and the Bernaupis rivulet. The Lendrynė Ornitological Sanctuary is also located nearby Juodžiai.

== History ==
In the late 19th century, there was both Juodžiai village and a folwark (a property of Benedykt Tyszkiewicz). There was the Crucified Jesus chapel (built in 1780).

== Demography ==
Historical population

Year	Pop.	±% p.a.
1902	322	—
1923	126	−4.37%
1959	127	+0.02%
1970	131	+0.28%

Year	Pop.	±% p.a.
1979	102	−2.74%
1989	68	−3.97%
2001	75	+0.82%
2011	62	−1.89%

Source: 1902, 1923, 1959 & 1970, 1979, 1989, 2001, 2011

== Images ==
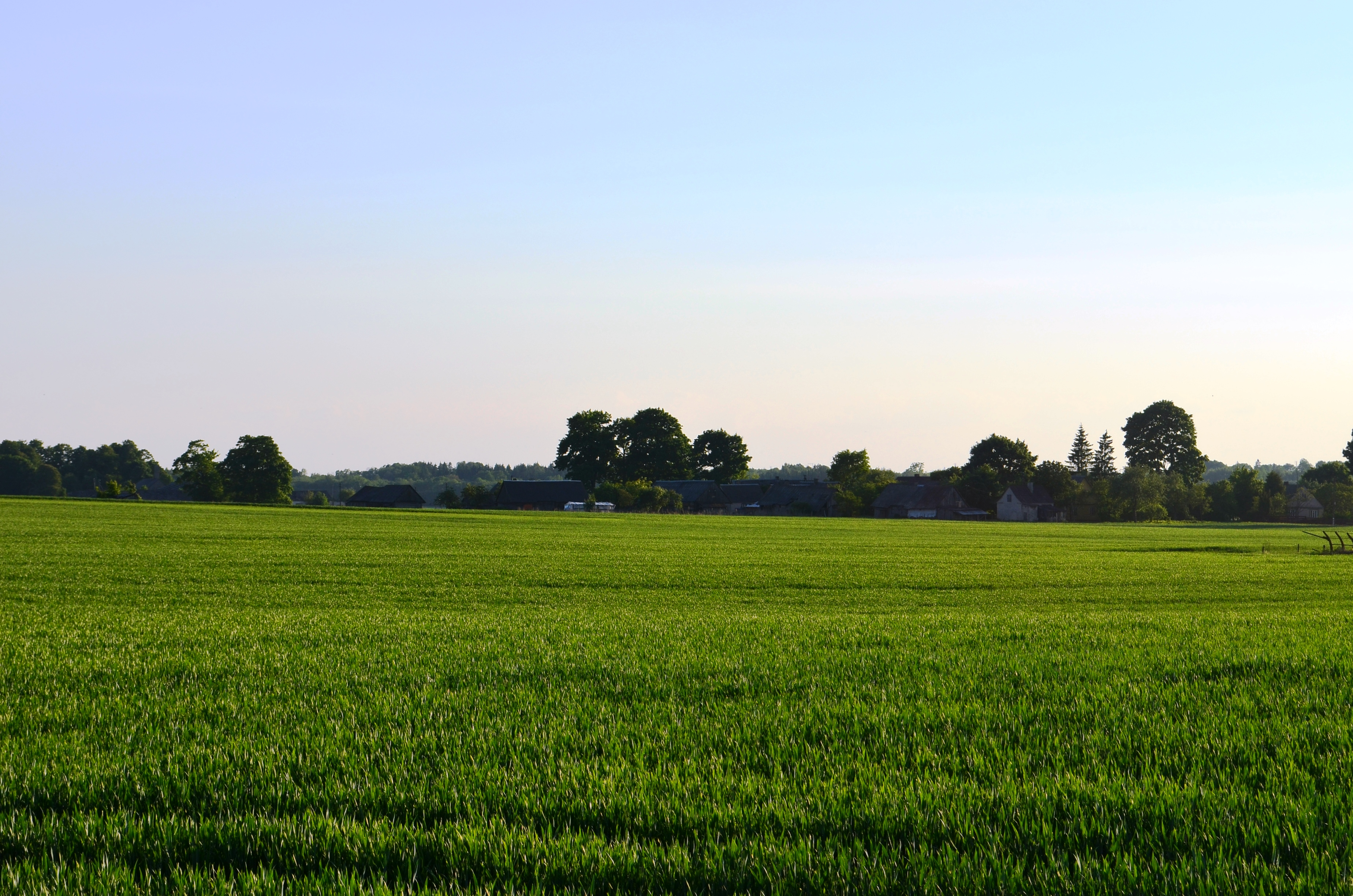
Juodžiai from the Pernarava-Pašušvys road

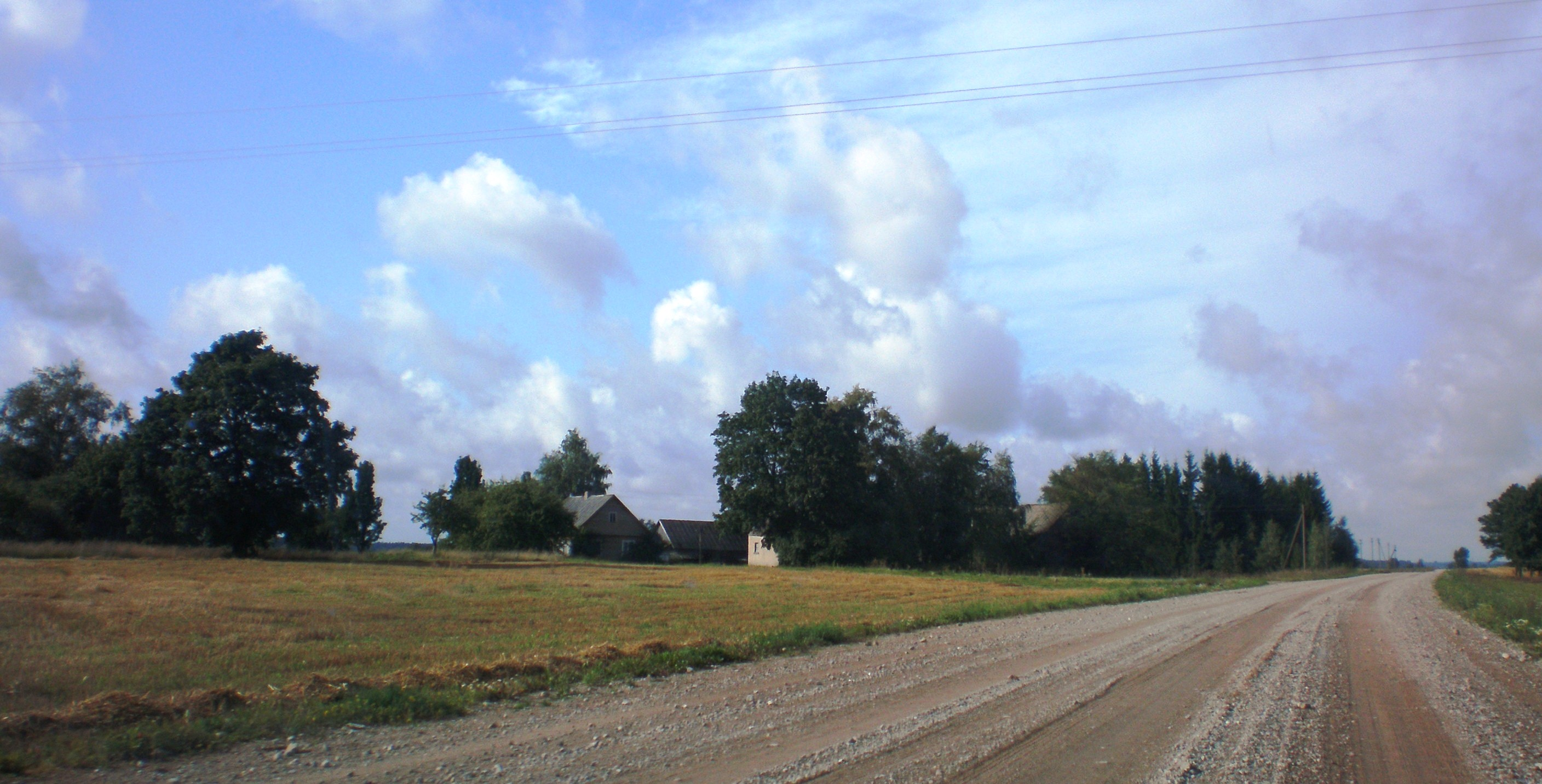
Juodžiai homestead

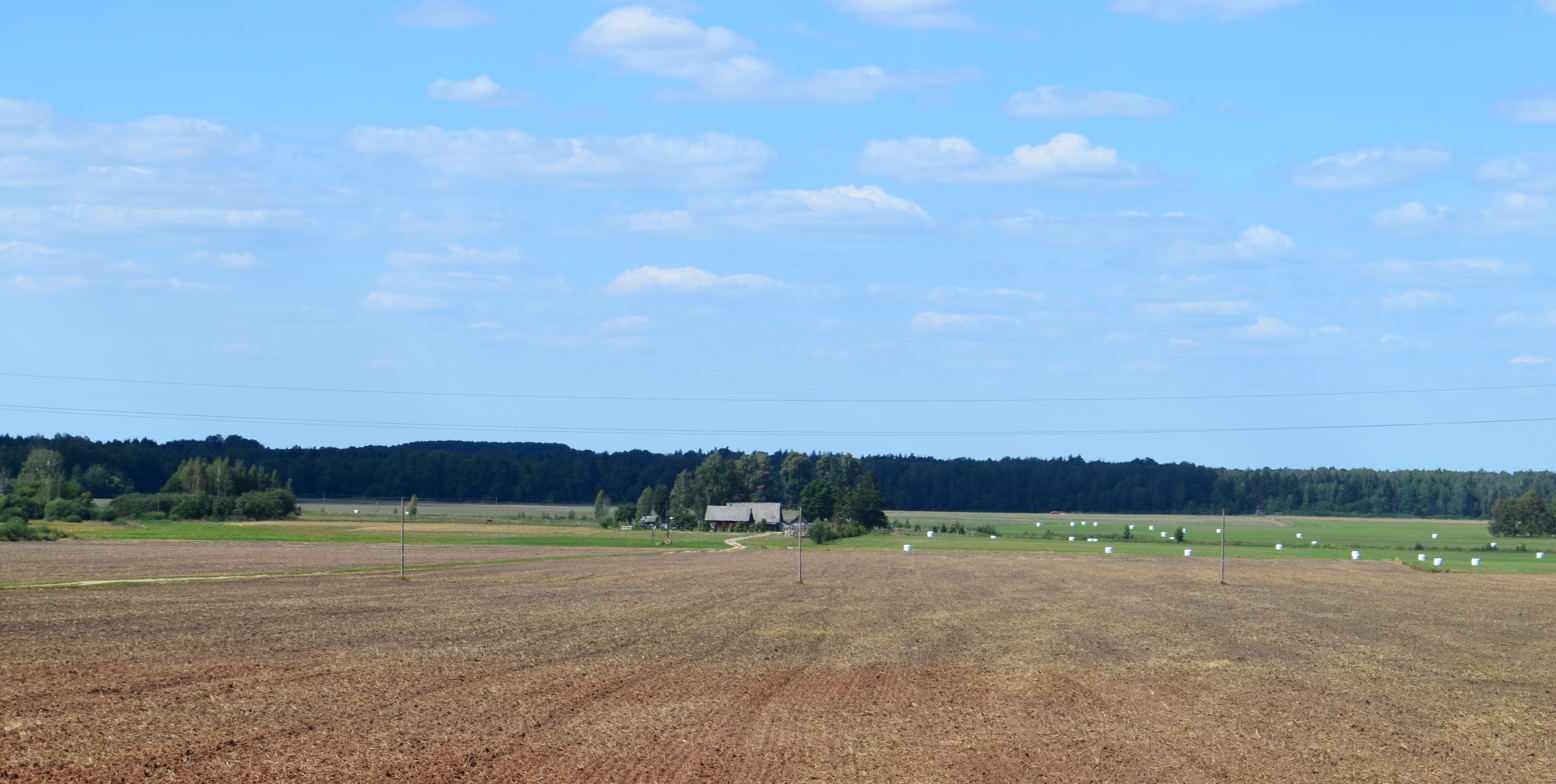
Juodžiai homestead and the Lapkalnys-Paliepiai Forest

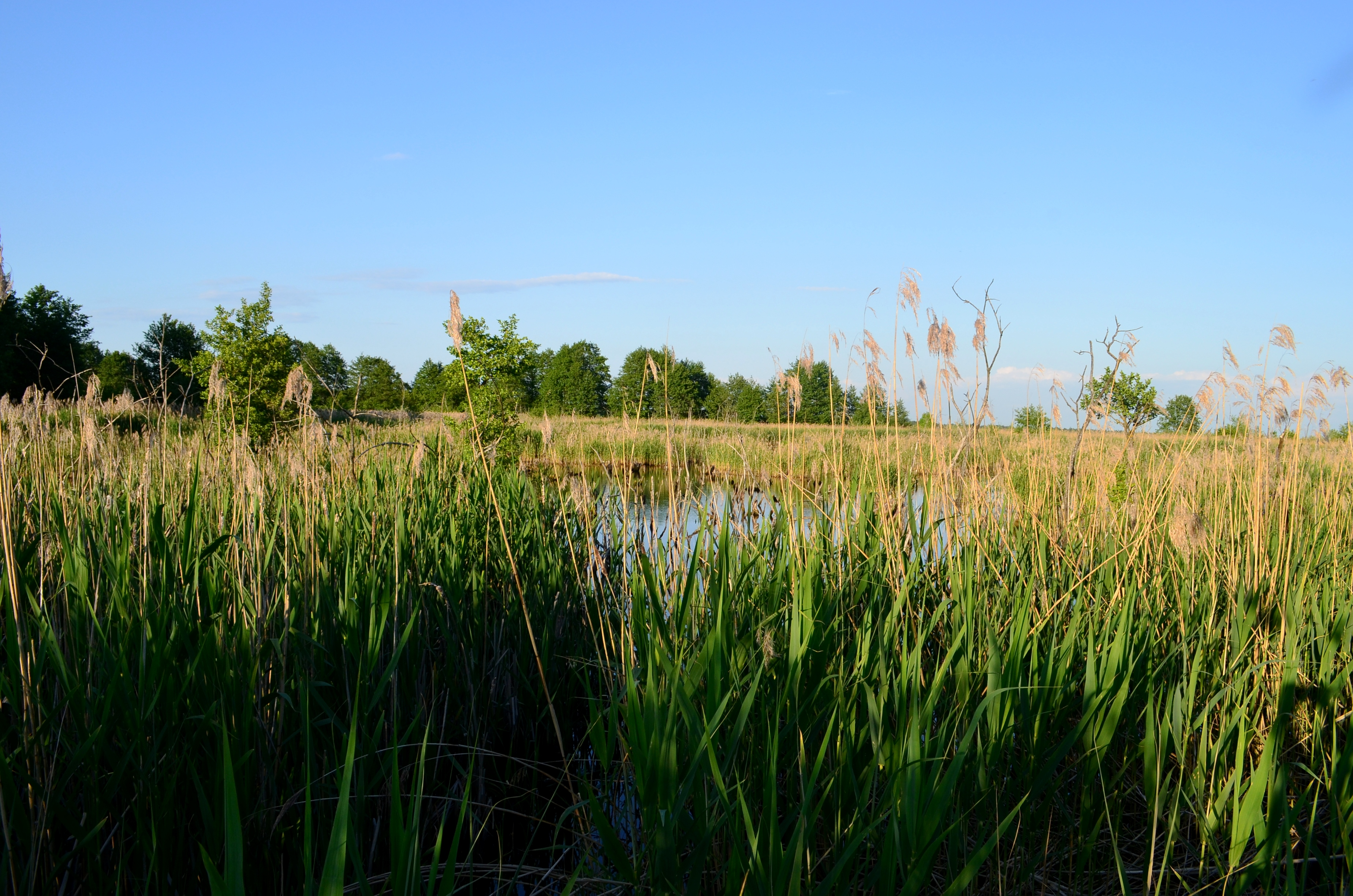
Lendrynė Sanctuary
