= Vosbučiai =

- Village
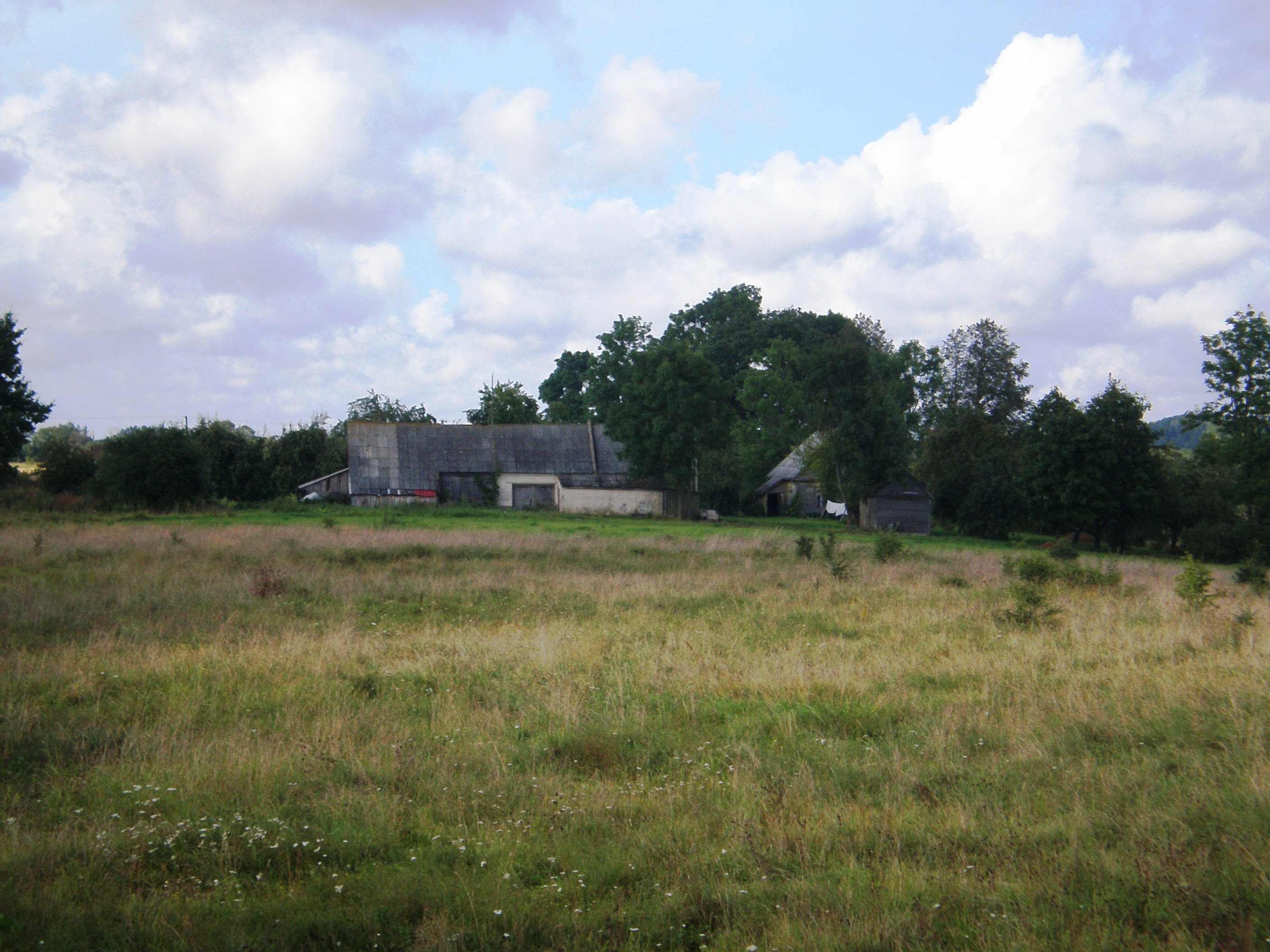

- Location in Lithuania Vosbučiai (Lithuania)
- Coordinates: 55°21′50″N 23°38′31″E
- Country: Lithuania
- County: Kaunas County
- Municipality: Kėdainiai district municipality
- Eldership: Krakės Eldership

Population (2011)
  - Total: 8
- Time zone: UTC+2 (EET)
  - Summer (DST): UTC+3 (EEST)

Vosbučiai (formerly Russian: Возбуты) is a village in Kėdainiai district municipality, in Kaunas County, in central Lithuania. According to the 2011 census, the village had a population of 8 people. It is located 2 kilometres (1.2 mi) from Pajieslys, on the right bank of the Šušvė river, by its tributary the Pečupė mouth. There are the Vosbučiai hillfort and the Vosbučiai outcrop (nature heritage object) in the village. The Lapkalnys-Paliepiai Forest begins west from the village. The Vocbučiai Botanical Zoological Sanctuary is located in Vosbučiai.

Vosbučiai is known since 1593. There was a folwark before the Soviet era.

== Demography ==
Historical population

Year	Pop.	±% p.a.
1902	57	—
1923	52	−0.44%
1959	63	+0.53%
1970	61	−0.29%
1979	32	−6.92%

Year	Pop.	±% p.a.
1987	26	−2.56%
1989	17	−19.14%
2001	14	−1.60%
2011	8	−5.44%

Source: 1902, 1923, 1959 & 1970, 1979, 1989, 2001, 2011

== Images ==
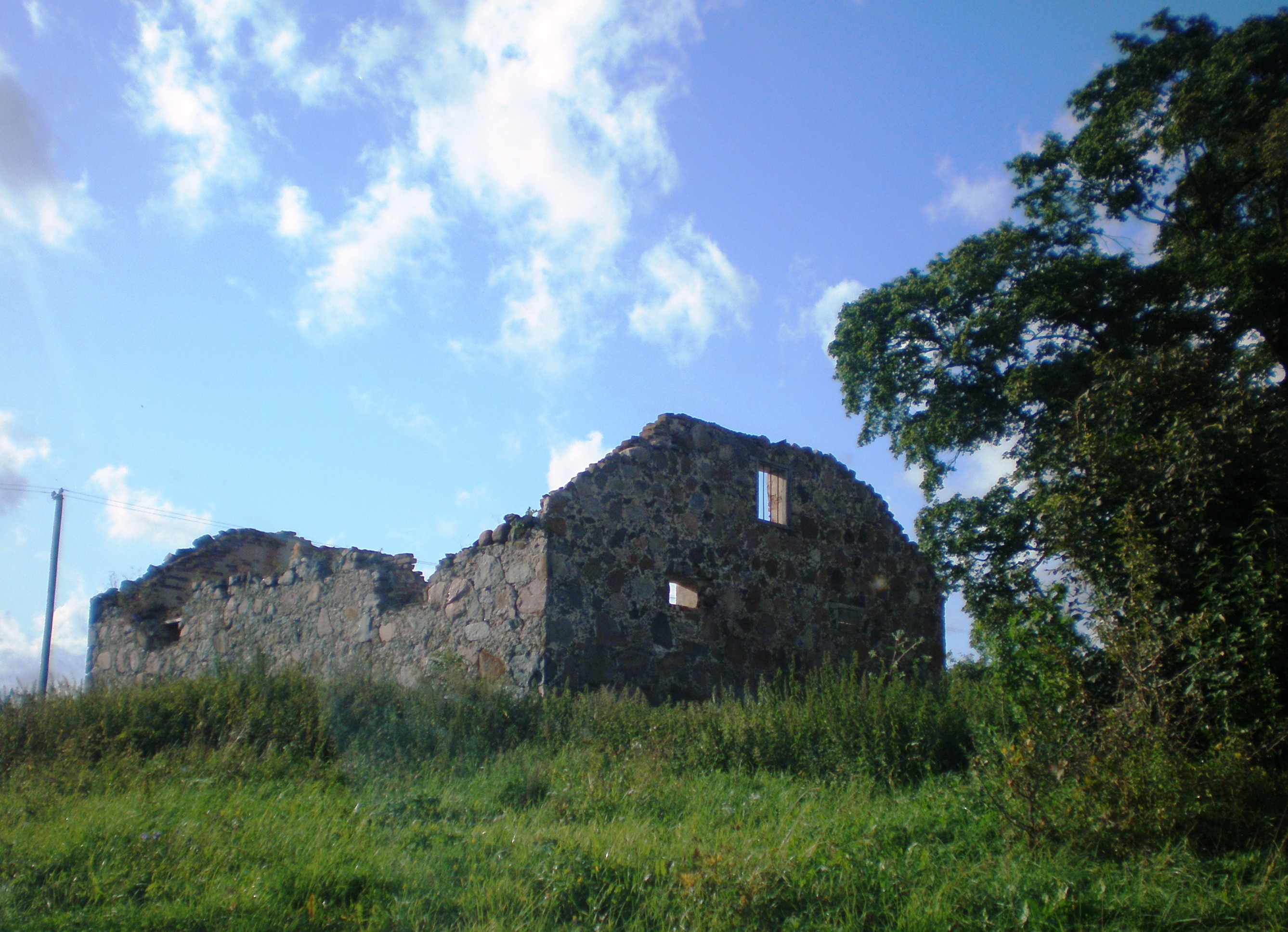
Former folwark building

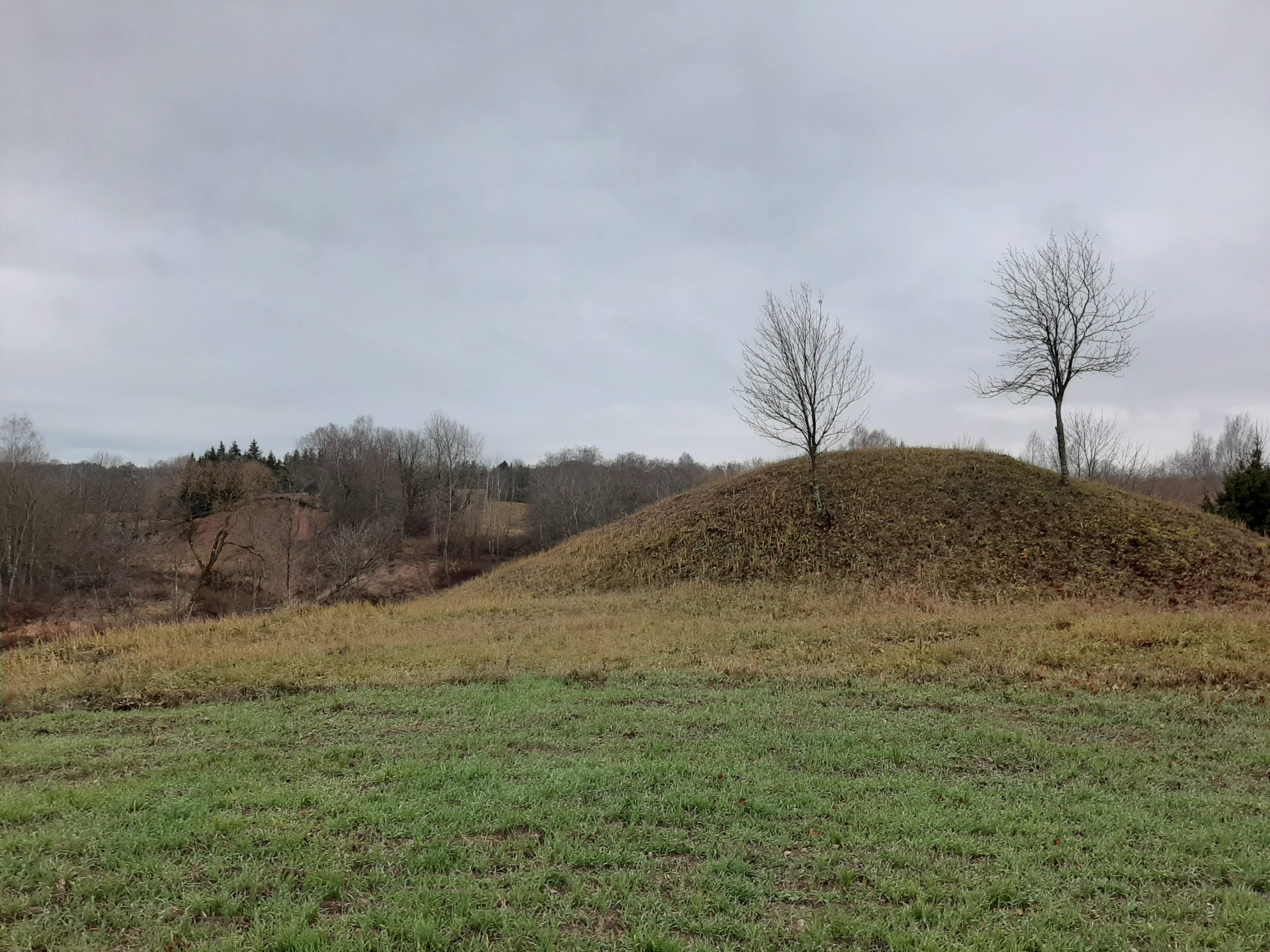
Vosbučiai hillfort

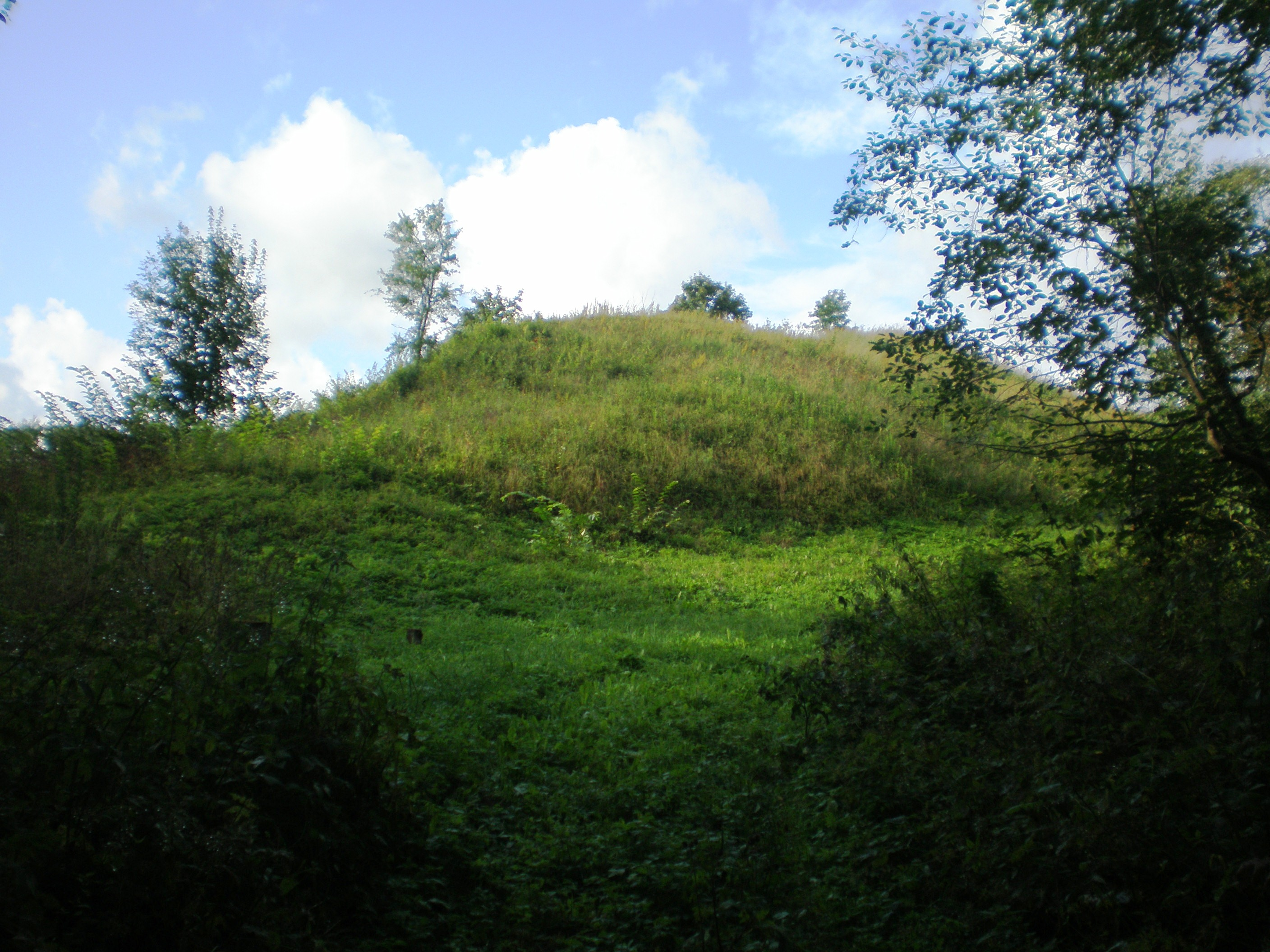
Vosbučiai hillfort

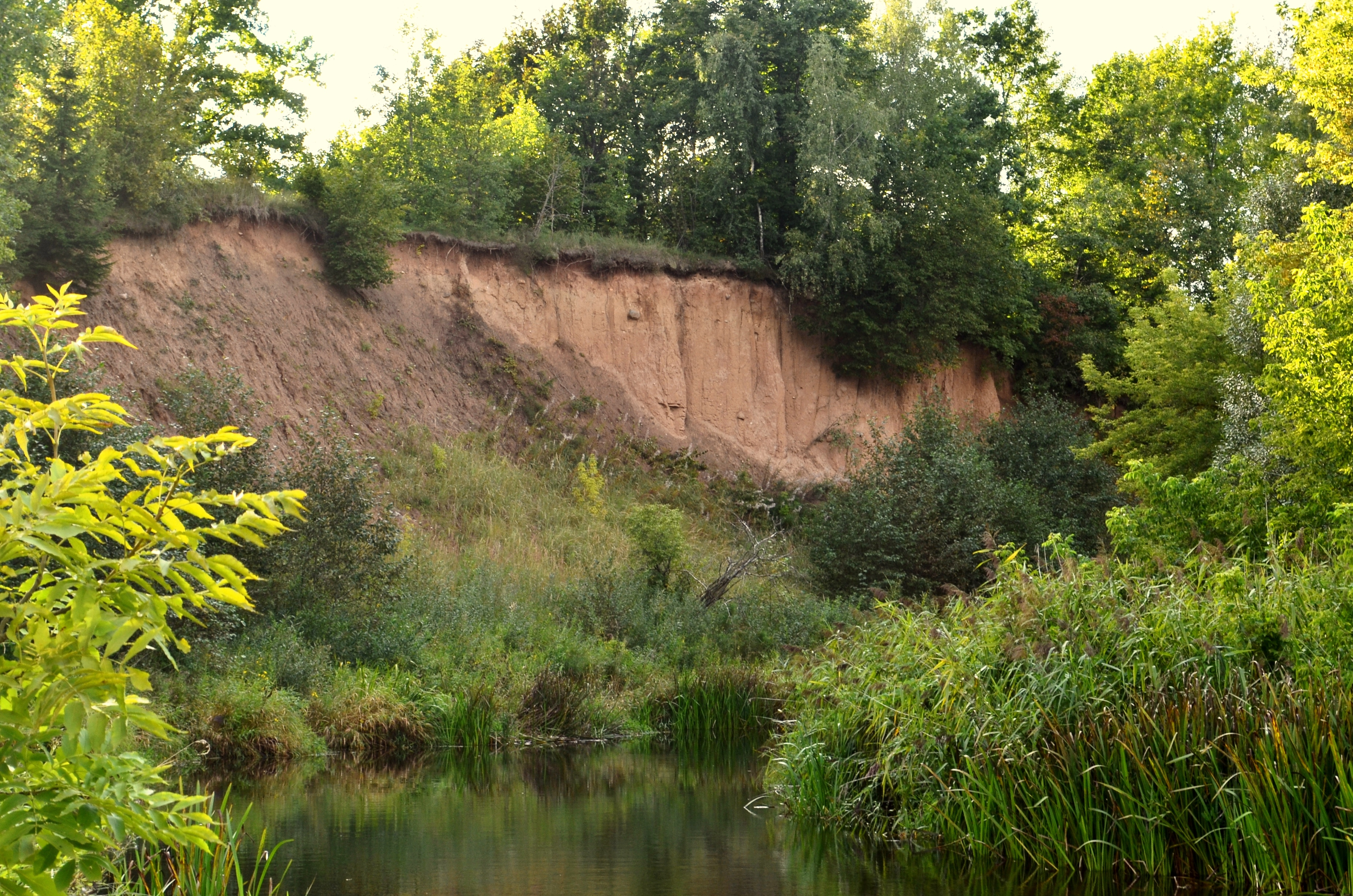
Vosbučiai outcrop
