= Degimai, Krakės =

Degimai
- Village
- Location in Lithuania Degimai (Lithuania)
- Coordinates: 55°21′0″N 23°37′0″E
- Country: Lithuania
- County: Kaunas County
- Municipality: Kėdainiai district municipality
- Eldership: Krakės Eldership

Population (2011)
  - Total: 0
- Time zone: UTC+2 (EET)
  - Summer (DST): UTC+3 (EEST)

Degimai ('burnt places') is a village in Kėdainiai district municipality, in Kaunas County, in central Lithuania. According to the 2011 census, the village was uninhabited. It is located 2 kilometres (1.2 mi) from Guptilčiai, in the Lapkalnys-Paliepiai Forest.

== Demography ==
Historical population

Year	Pop.	±% p.a.
1923	31	—
1959	29	−0.19%
1970	21	−2.89%
1979	0	−100.00%

Year	Pop.	±% p.a.
1989	0	0.00%
2001	0	0.00%
2011	0	0.00%

Source: 1902, 1923, 1959 & 1970, 1979, 1989, 2001, 2011
