= Guptilčiai =

- Village
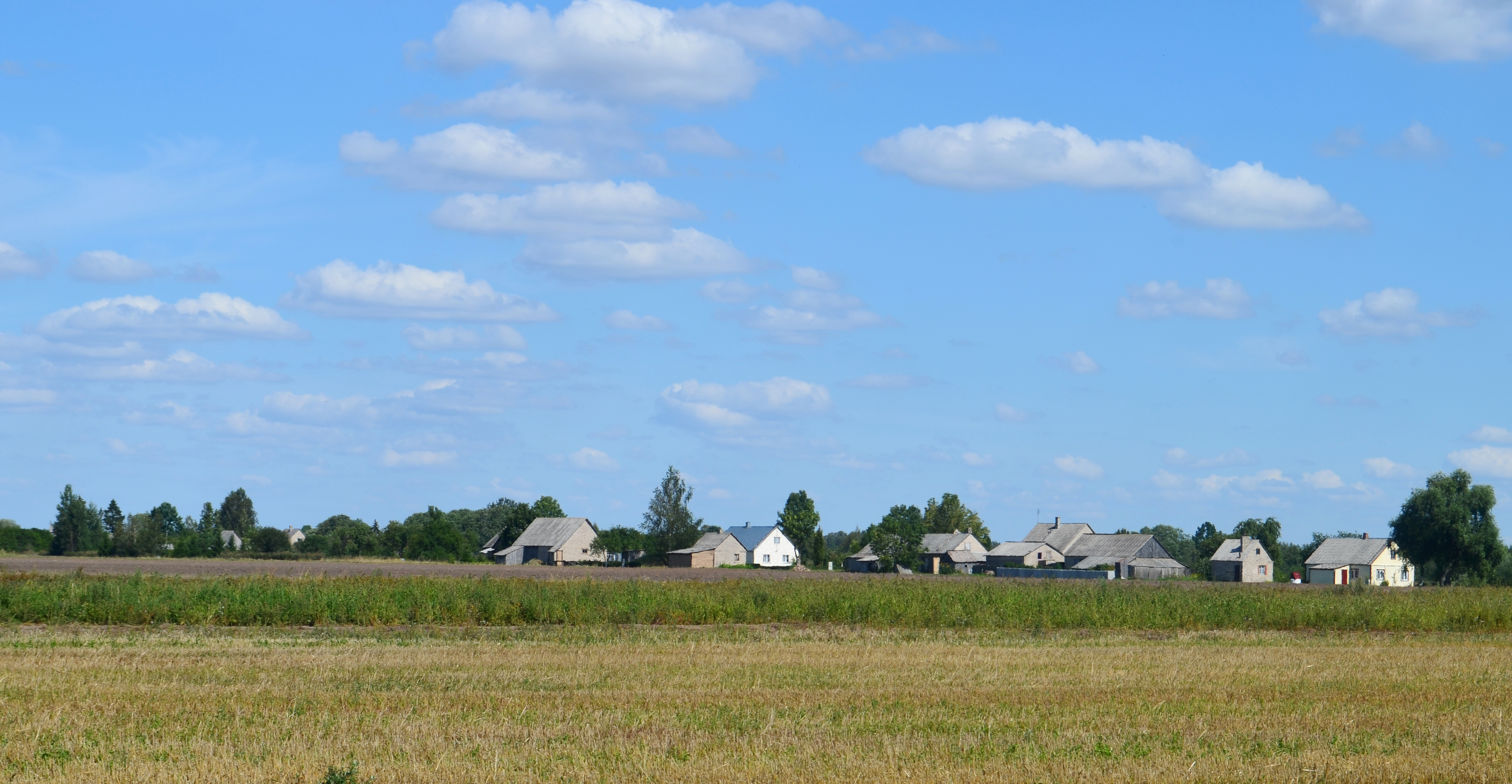

- Location in Lithuania Guptilčiai (Lithuania)
- Coordinates: 55°21′00″N 23°38′49″E
- Country: Lithuania
- County: Kaunas County
- Municipality: Kėdainiai district municipality
- Eldership: Krakės Eldership

Population (2011)
  - Total: 38
- Time zone: UTC+2 (EET)
  - Summer (DST): UTC+3 (EEST)

Guptilčiai (formerly Guptelčiai, Gūptelčiai, Polish: Gubtylcie, Gubtylcy, Russian: Губтыльцы) is a village in Kėdainiai district municipality, in Kaunas County, in central Lithuania. According to the 2011 census, the village had a population of 38 people. It is located 1.5 kilometres (0.93 mi) from Pajieslys, between the Lapkalnys-Paliepiai Forest and the Šušvė river.

Guptilčiai village is known since 1593 (there were 4 voloks of land). It was split into single homesteads in 1932.

== Demography ==
Historical population

Year	Pop.	±% p.a.
1820	34	—
1902	116	+1.51%
1923	69	−2.44%
1939	72	+0.27%
1959	65	−0.51%
1970	56	−1.35%

Year	Pop.	±% p.a.
1979	64	+1.49%
1985	60	−1.07%
1989	49	−4.94%
2001	42	−1.28%
2011	38	−1.00%

Source: 1902, 1923, 1959 & 1970, 1979, 1989, 2001, 2011
