= Žostautai, Kėdainiai =

Žostautai
- Village
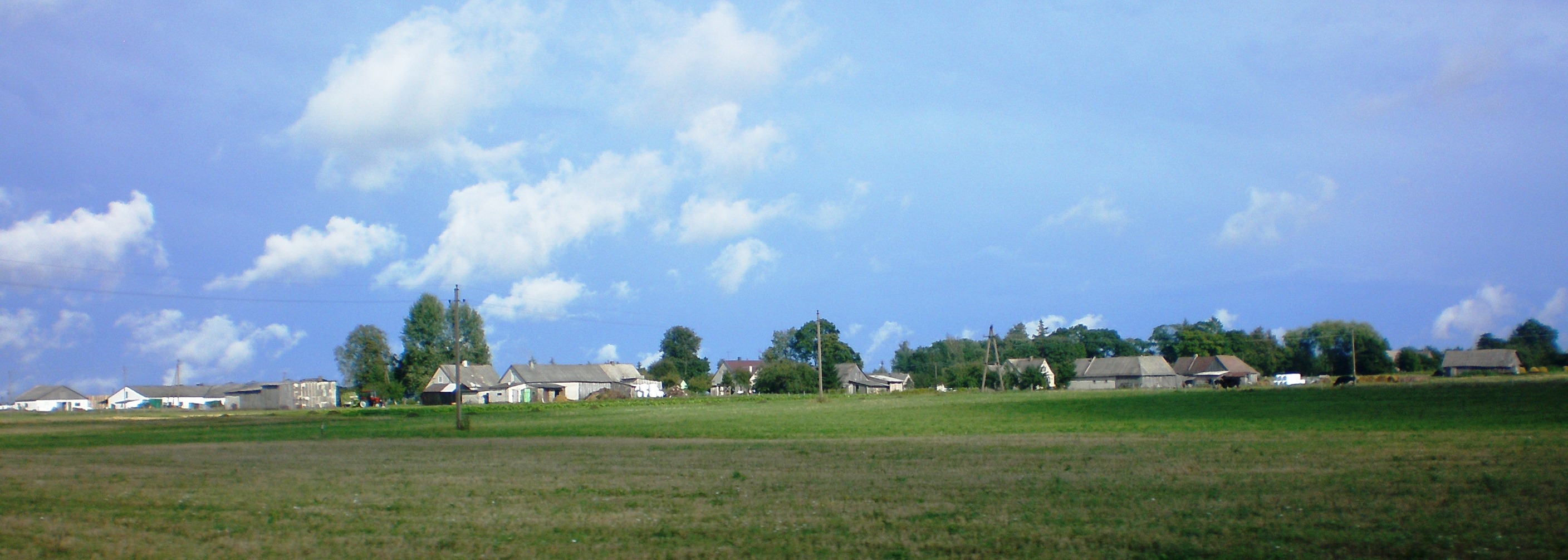

- Location in Lithuania Žostautai (Lithuania)
- Coordinates: 55°18′12″N 23°38′49″E
- Country: Lithuania
- County: Kaunas County
- Municipality: Kėdainiai district municipality
- Eldership: Pernarava Eldership

Population (2011)
  - Total: 53
- Time zone: UTC+2 (EET)
  - Summer (DST): UTC+3 (EEST)

Žostautai or Zaštautai (formerly Russian: Заштовты, Polish: Zasztowty) is a village in Kėdainiai district municipality, in Kaunas County, in central Lithuania. According to the 2011 census, the village had a population of 53 people. It is located 4 kilometres (2.5 mi) from Pernarava, between the Lapkalnys-Paliepiai Forest and the Šušvė river. There is a farm.

== History ==
Žostautai has been known since 1596. There was Žostautai village and folwark at the end of the 19th century. During the Soviet era it was a subsidiary kolkhoz settlement.

== Demography ==
Historical population

Year	Pop.	±% p.a.
1866	99	—
1923	228	+1.47%
1959	198	−0.39%
1970	173	−1.22%
1979	132	−2.96%

Year	Pop.	±% p.a.
1987	112	−2.03%
1989	97	−6.94%
2001	81	−1.49%
2011	53	−4.15%

Source: 1902, 1923, 1959 & 1970, 1979, 1989, 2001, 2011

== Images ==
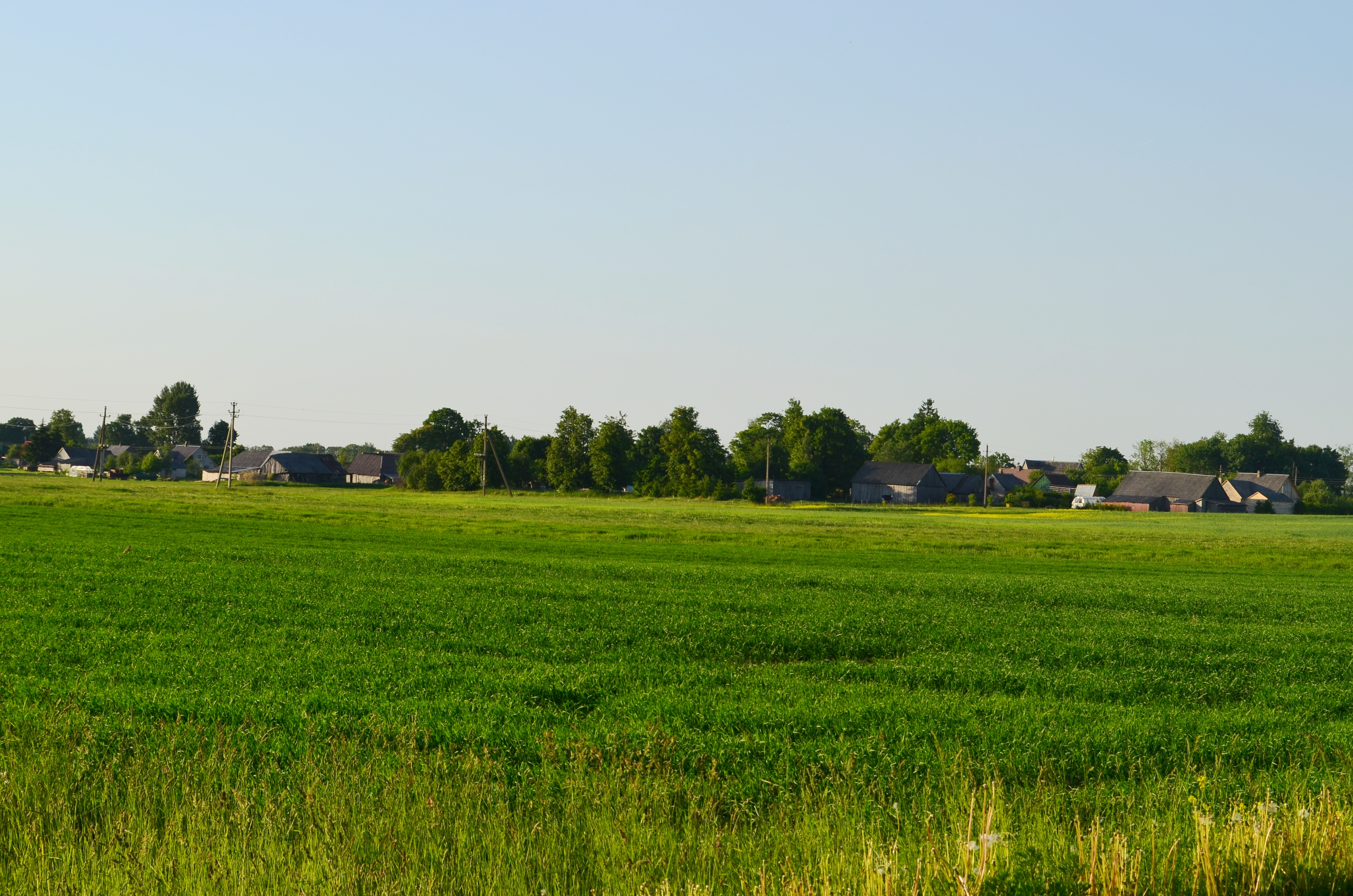
Žostautai from the west

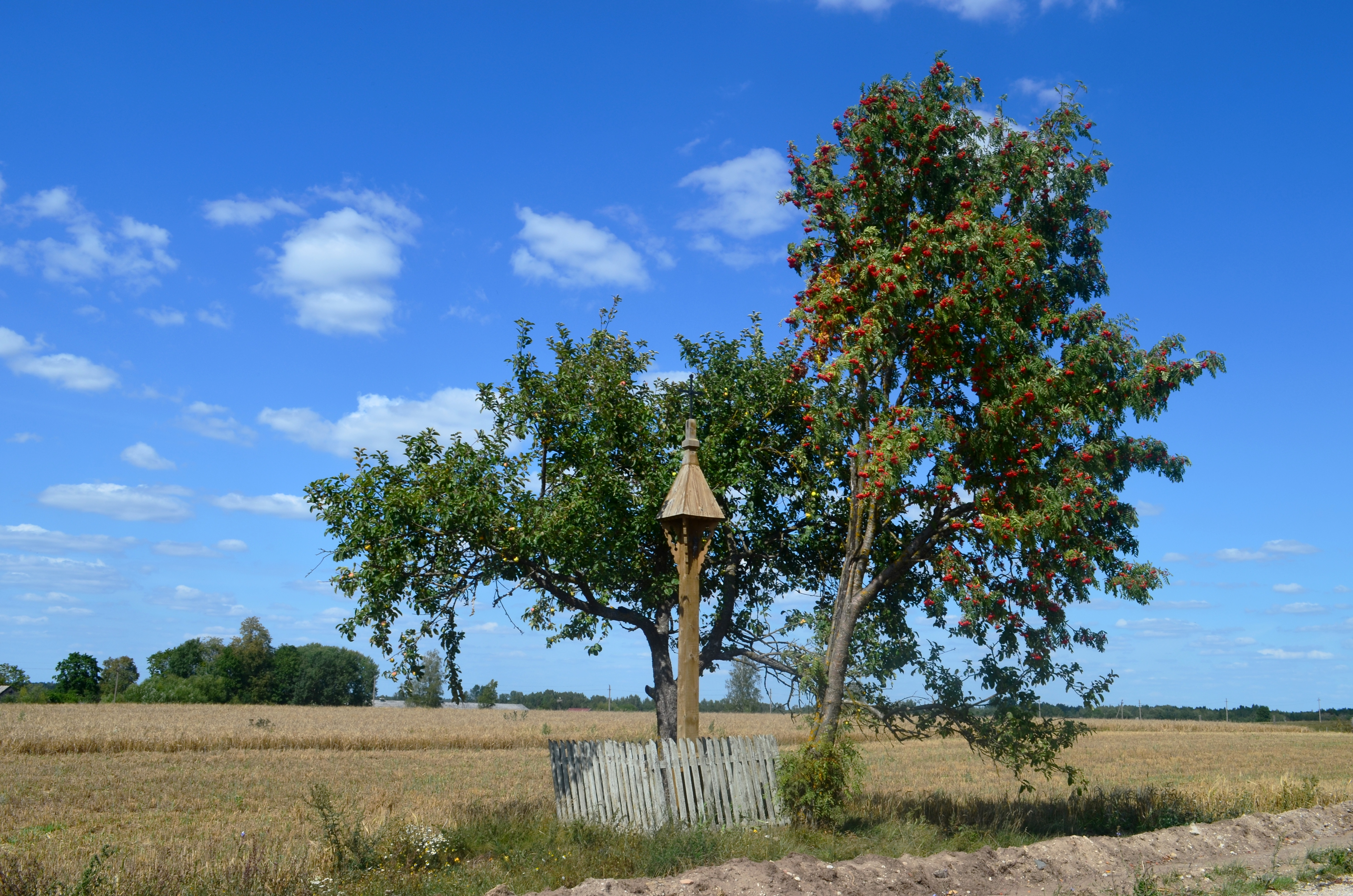
Žostautai roofed pole (Žostautų stogastulpis)

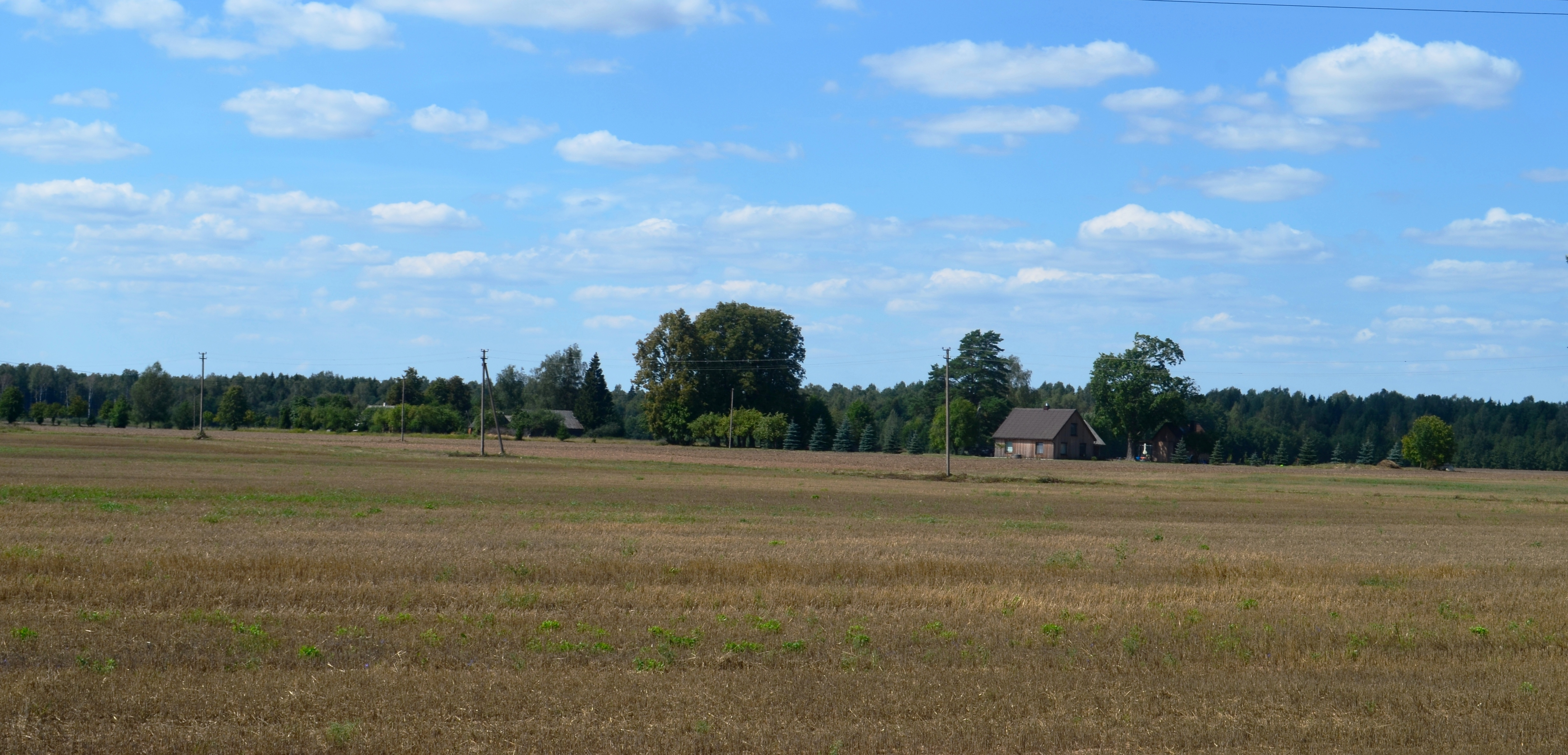
Western part of Žostautai nearby forest
