= Veiveriai Eldership =

Eldership of Lithuania

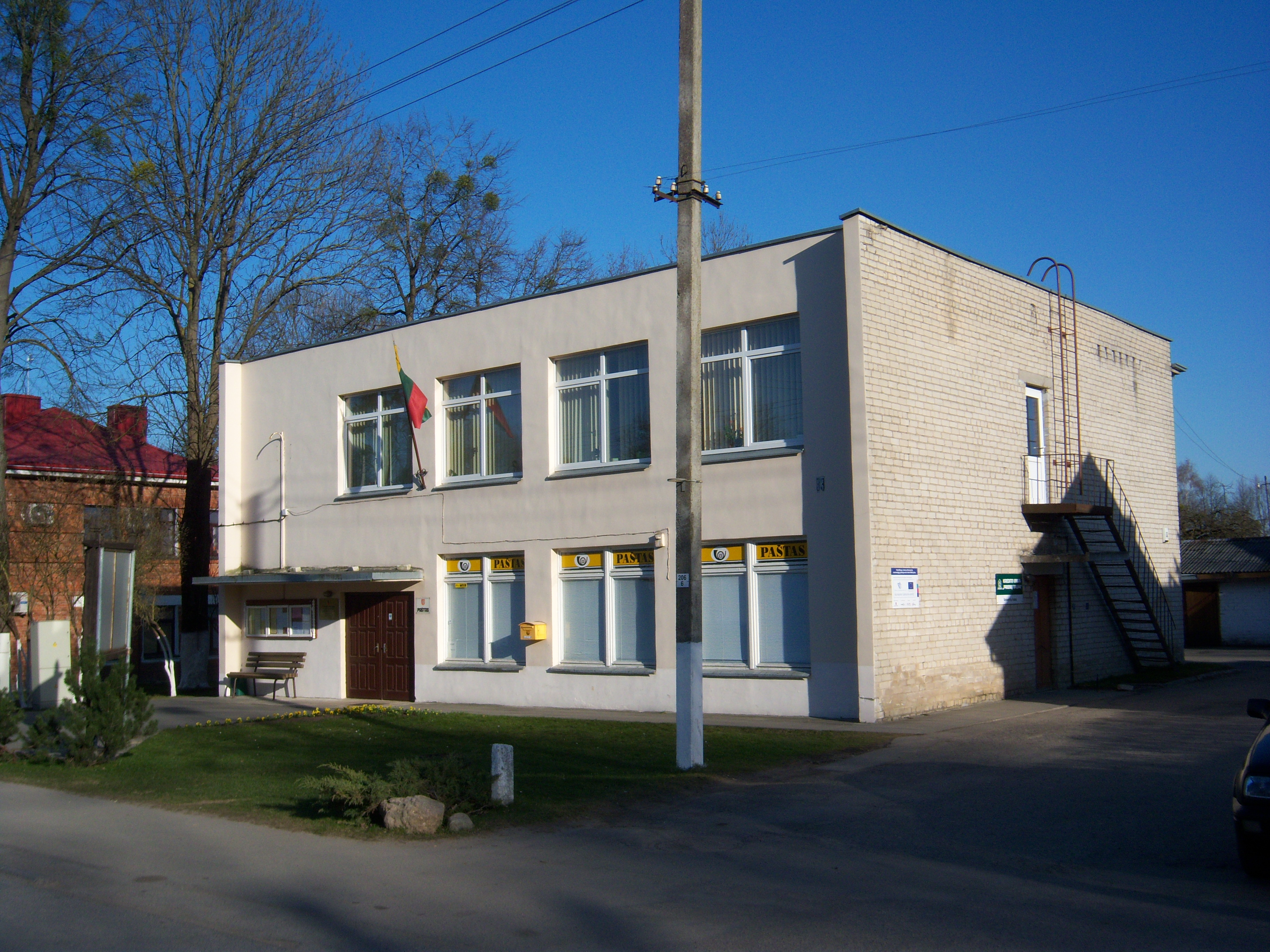
Veiveriai Eldership, Lithuania

The Veiveriai Eldership (Lithuanian: Veiverių seniūnija) is an eldership of Lithuania, located in the Prienai District Municipality. In 2021 its population was 3377.
