= Skirgailinė =

- Village
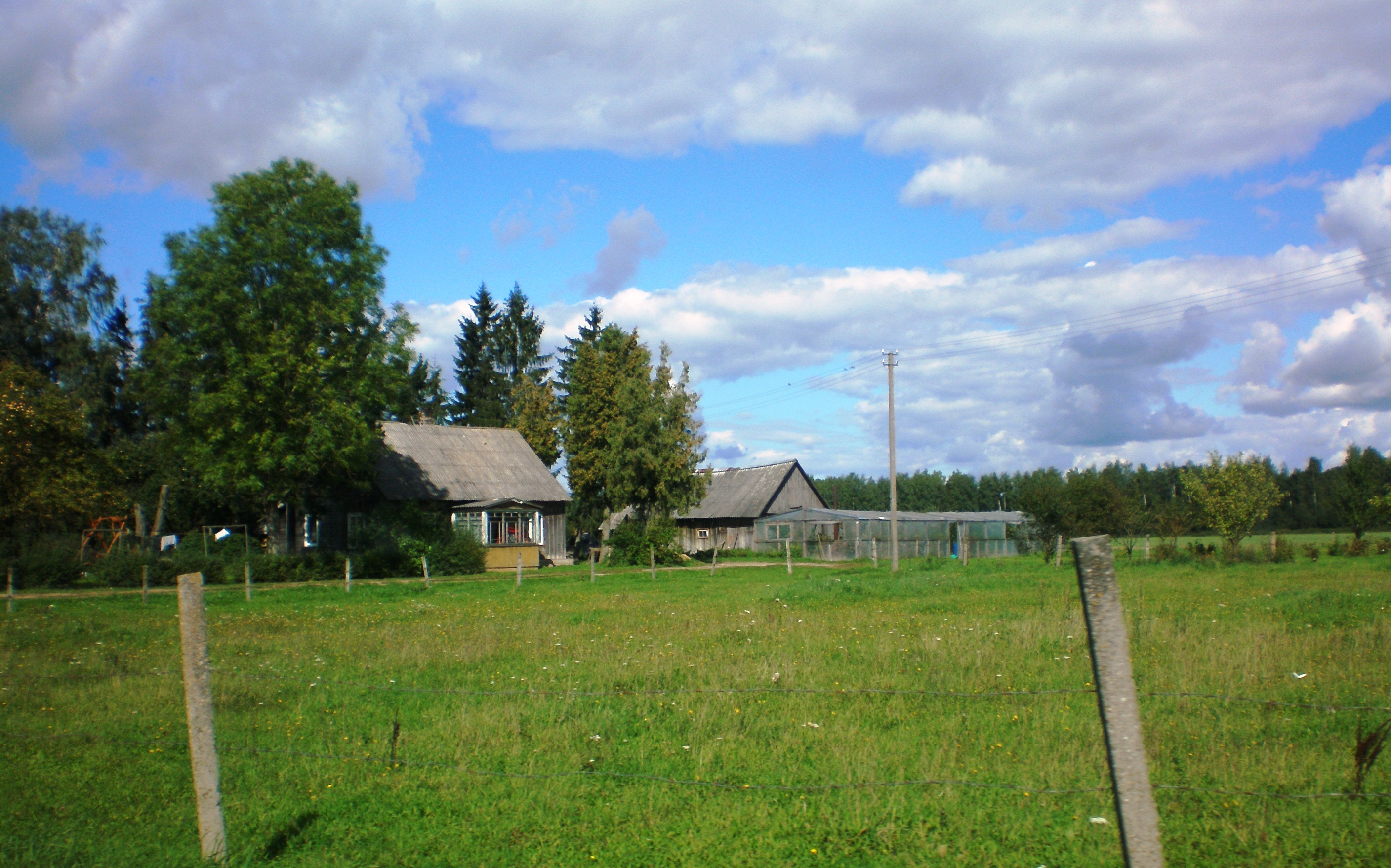

- Location in Lithuania Skirgailinė (Lithuania)
- Coordinates: 55°24′40″N 23°34′41″E
- Country: Lithuania
- County: Kaunas County
- Municipality: Kėdainiai district municipality
- Eldership: Krakės Eldership

Population (2011)
  - Total: 4
- Time zone: UTC+2 (EET)
  - Summer (DST): UTC+3 (EEST)

Skirgailinė is a village in Kėdainiai district municipality, in Kaunas County, in central Lithuania. According to the 2011 census, the village had a population of 4 people. It is located 3 kilometres (1.9 mi) from Pašušvys, on the edge of the Lapkalnys-Paliepiai Forest. There is a forestry.

== Demography ==
Historical population

| Year | Pop. | ±% p.a. |
|---|---|---|
| 1959 | 36 | — |
| 1970 | 23 | −3.99% |
| 1979 | 7 | −12.38% |

| Year | Pop. | ±% p.a. |
|---|---|---|
| 1989 | 7 | +0.00% |
| 2001 | 13 | +5.29% |
| 2011 | 4 | −11.12% |

Source: 1902, 1923, 1959 & 1970, 1979, 1989, 2001, 2011
