= Naujoji Ūta Eldership =

Eldership of Lithuania

The Naujoji Ūta Eldership (Lithuanian: Naujosios Ūtos seniūnija) is an eldership of Lithuania, located in the Prienai District Municipality. In 2021 its population was 785.
