= Pašušvys, Kėdainiai =

Pašušvys
- Village
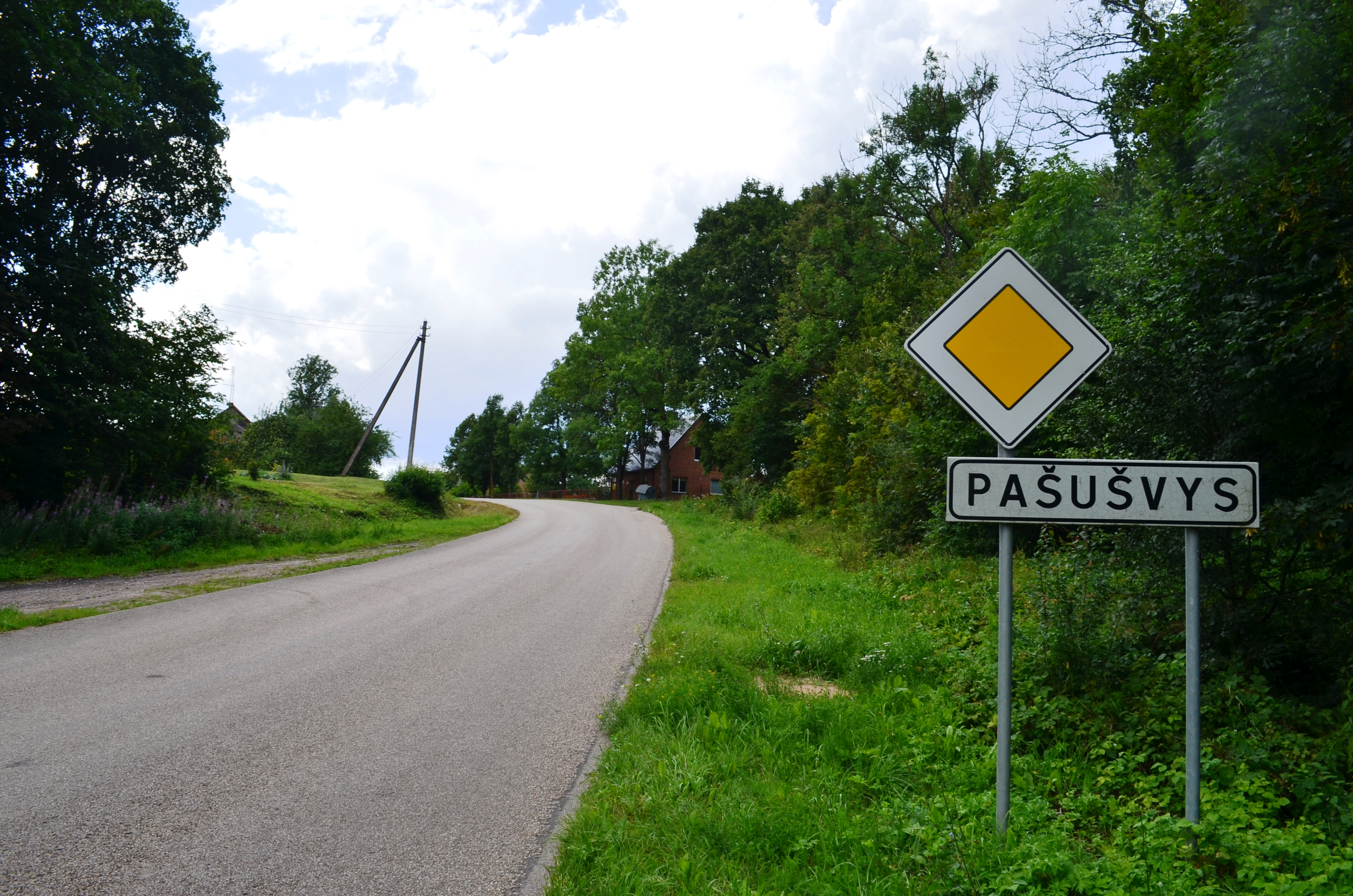

- Location in Lithuania Pašušvys (Lithuania)
- Coordinates: 55°24′22″N 23°37′52″E
- Country: Lithuania
- County: Kaunas County
- Municipality: Kėdainiai district municipality
- Eldership: Krakės Eldership

Population (2011)
  - Total: 91
- Time zone: UTC+2 (EET)
  - Summer (DST): UTC+3 (EEST)

Pašušvys (formerly Russian: Пошушве, Polish: Poszuszwie) is a village in Kėdainiai district municipality, in Kaunas County, in central Lithuania. According to the 2011 census, the village had a population of 91 people. It is located 6 kilometres (3.7 mi) from Krakės, on the right bank of the Šušvė river, along the Krakės-Betygala road. There are a community house, a cemetery of the First World War victims, a derelict watermill, some buildings of the Pašušvys Manor, and a former manor park. An ancient burial place is located nearby. The Pašušvys Landscape Sanctuary is located by the Šušvė river. The Pašušvys forestry is in Skirgailinė village.

== History ==
In 1585 Aklapuodis village was located in the current place of Pašušvys. Later, the manor emerged and Aklapuodis village was moved to other place in 1862 (now Plinkaigalis). At the end of the 19th century there were a watermill and St. Joachim chapel in the Pašušvys Manor.

During the Soviet era Pašušvys was a subsidiary kolhoz settlement. There were a sawmill, culture house, primary school (since 1959), communication station.

== Demography ==
Historical population

Year	Pop.	±% p.a.
1902	88	—
1923	144	+2.37%
1959	89	−1.33%
1970	156	+5.23%
1979	137	−1.43%

Year	Pop.	±% p.a.
1986	117	−2.23%
1989	167	+12.59%
2001	282	+4.46%
2011	91	−10.69%

Source: 1902, 1923, 1959 & 1970, 1979, 1989, 2001, 2011

== Images ==
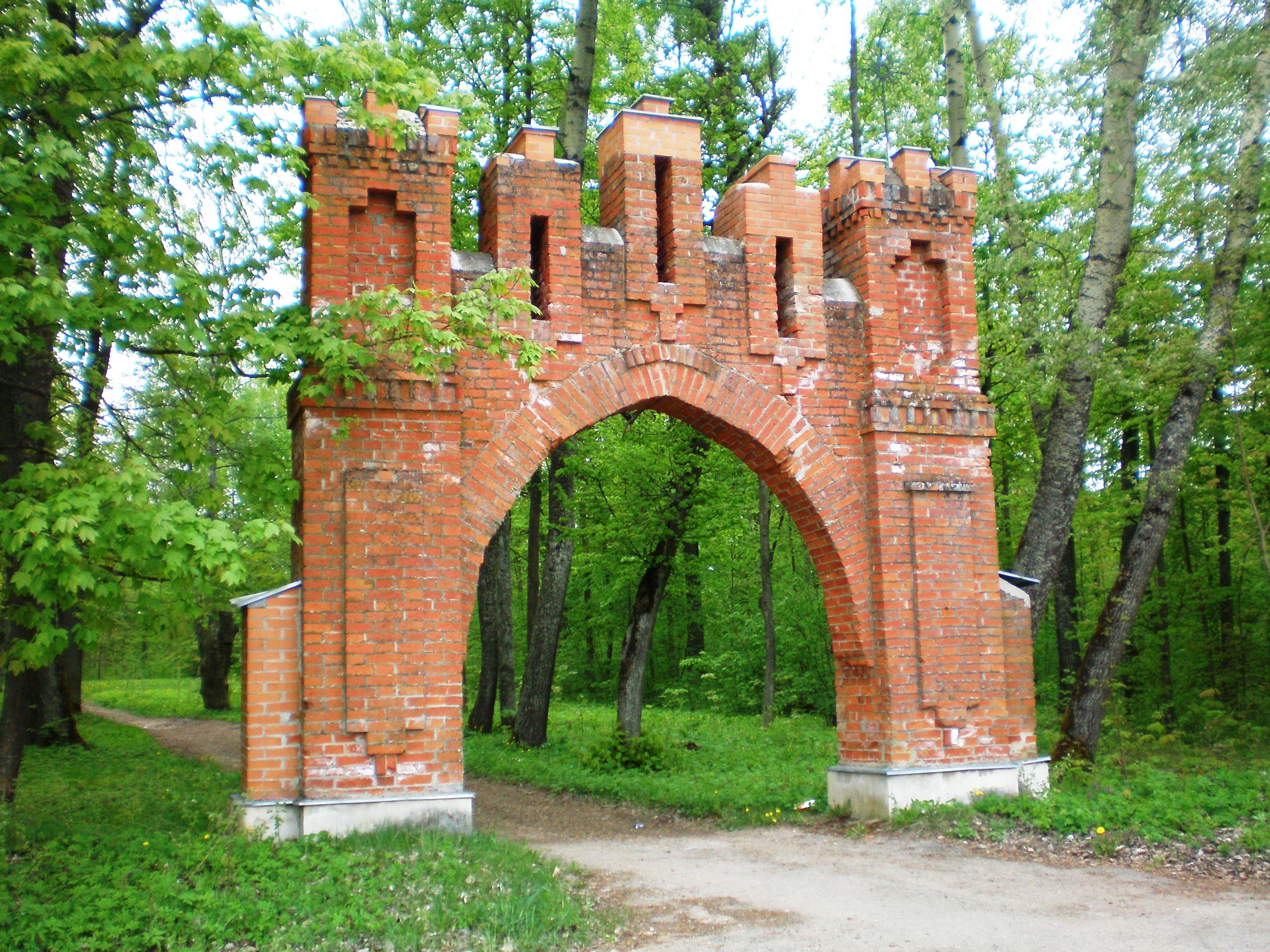
Gates of Pašušvys manor park (built in 1890)

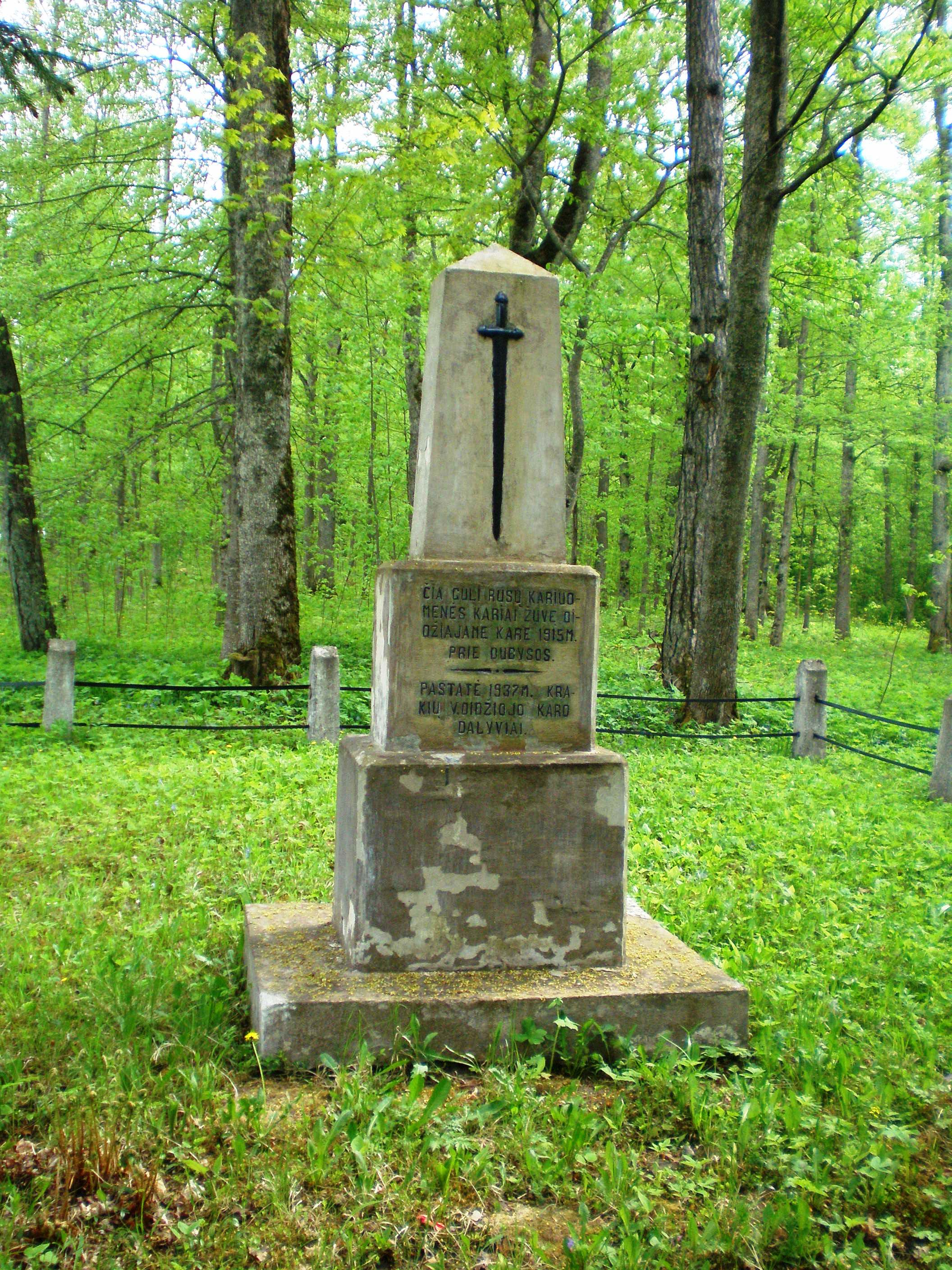
Monument to the Russian soldiers killed in the Battle of Dubysa during The First World War

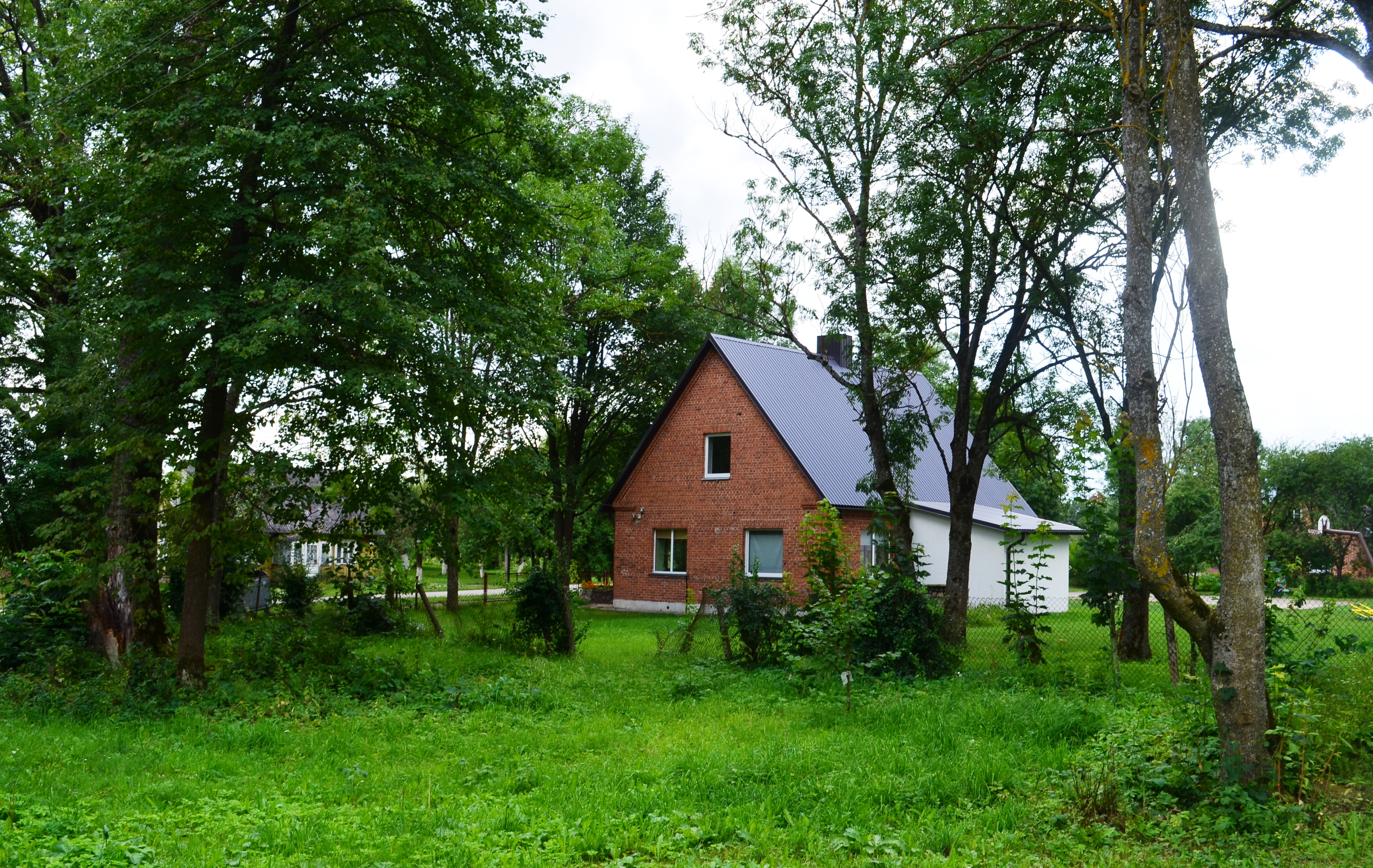
Community house (former school)

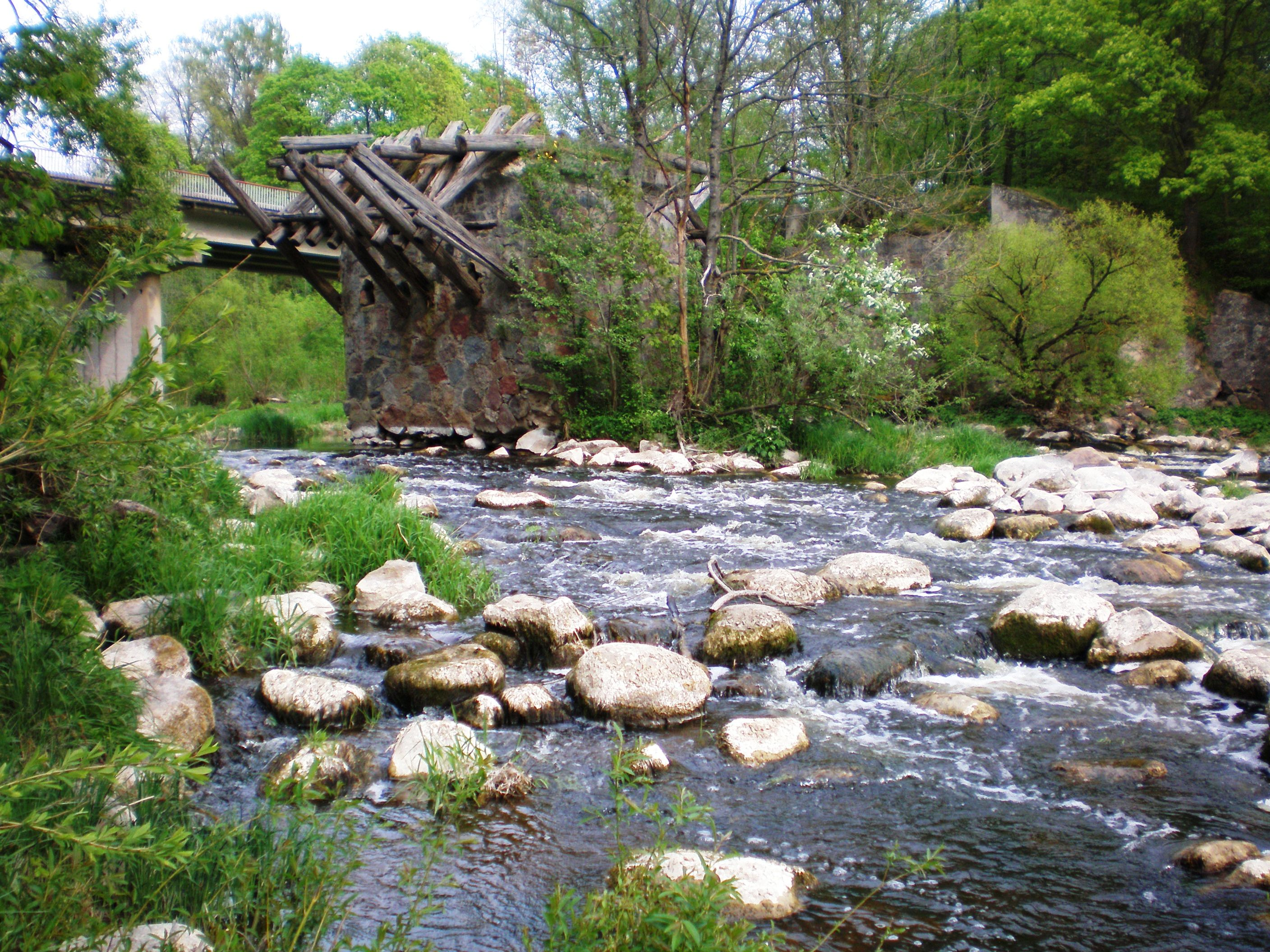
Šušvė in Pašušvys. A former bridge and watermill stones are seen

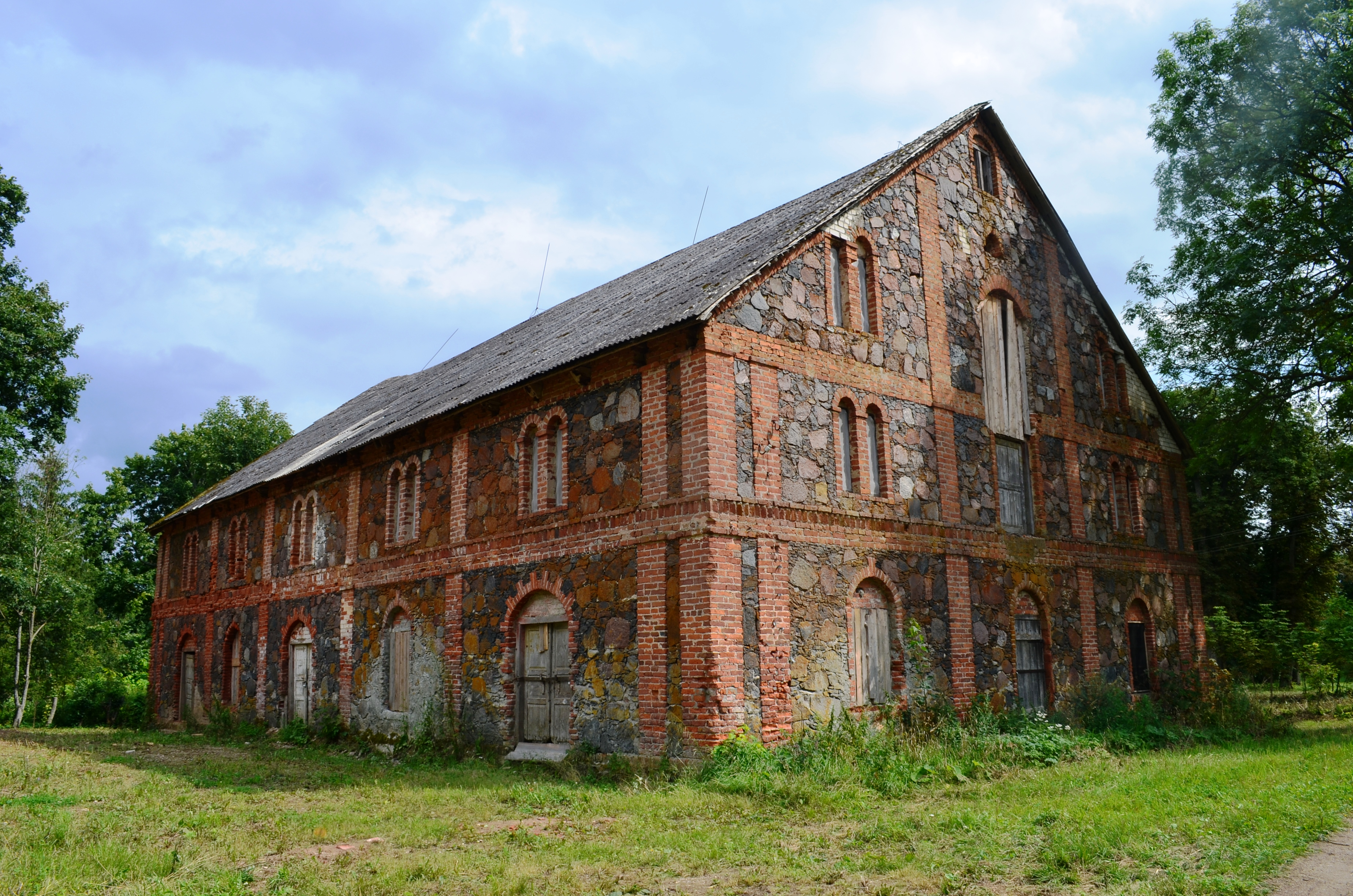
Barn of the Pašušvys manor
