= Lapkalnys–Paliepiai Forest =

Forest in Lithuania

Lapkalnys-Paliepiai Forest Lithuanian: Lapkalnio–Paliepių miškai
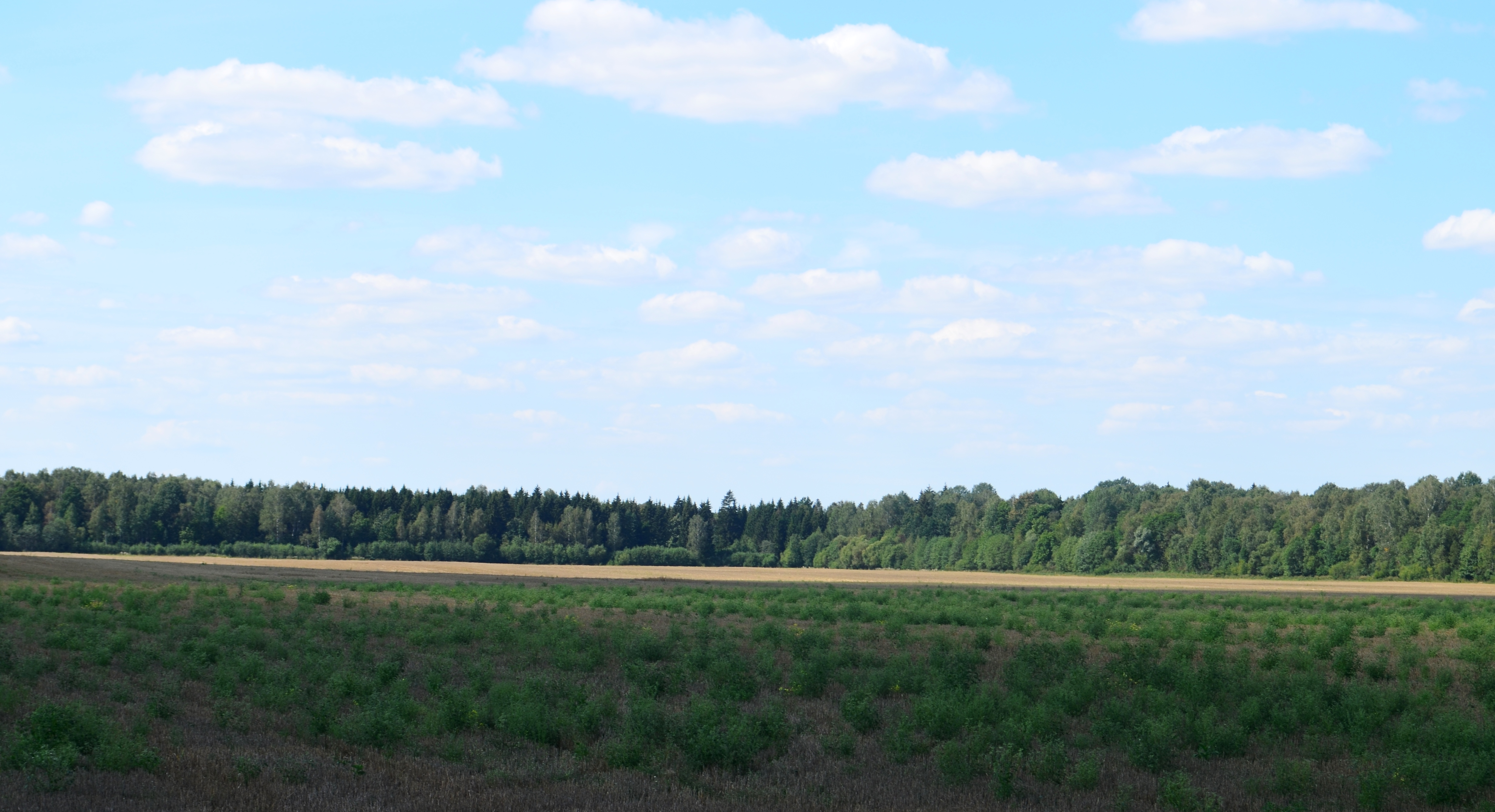
- The forest at the surroundings of Užvarčiai

- Location within Lithuania
- Interactive map of Lapkalnys-Paliepiai Forest

Geography
- Location: Kėdainiai District Municipality, Raseiniai District Municipality, Lithuania
- Coordinates: 55.366°N 23.600°E
- Area: 37.1 km^{2} (14.3 sq mi)

Ecology
- Forest cover: birch, spruce, aspen
- Fauna: wild boar, roe deer, red fox

The Lapkalnys–Paliepiai Forest (Lithuanian: Lapkalnio–Paliepių miškai) is a forest in Kėdainiai District Municipality and Raseiniai District Municipality, central Lithuania, located 8 kilometres (5.0 mi) to the north east from Ariogala. Covering an area of 3,710 hectares (9,200 acres), it consists of smaller forests: Juodžiai Forest, Lapkalnys Forest, Paliepiai Forest, Pašušvys Forest, Šilainiai Forest. It is on the watershed of the Dubysa (Gynėvė with Lendė and Upytė) and Nevėžis (Pečiupė, Ažytė, Ažynas, Raguva, Skerdūmė) rivers.

As of 2005, 48% of the area was covered by birch, 30% by spruce, 8% by aspen, 5% by ash, 3% by oak, 4% by black alder, 1% by white alder, 1% by pine, 1% by lime tree groups. There is the Zembiškis Forest Botanical Sanctuary in the forest.

Lapkalnys, Skirgailinė, Zembiškis, Paskerdūmiukas, Šulcava, Graužai, Tilindžiai, Paliepiai, Žostautai, Juodžiai, Šliužiai, Daujotėliai and Paliepiukai villages are inside the forest or on its edges.

== Images ==
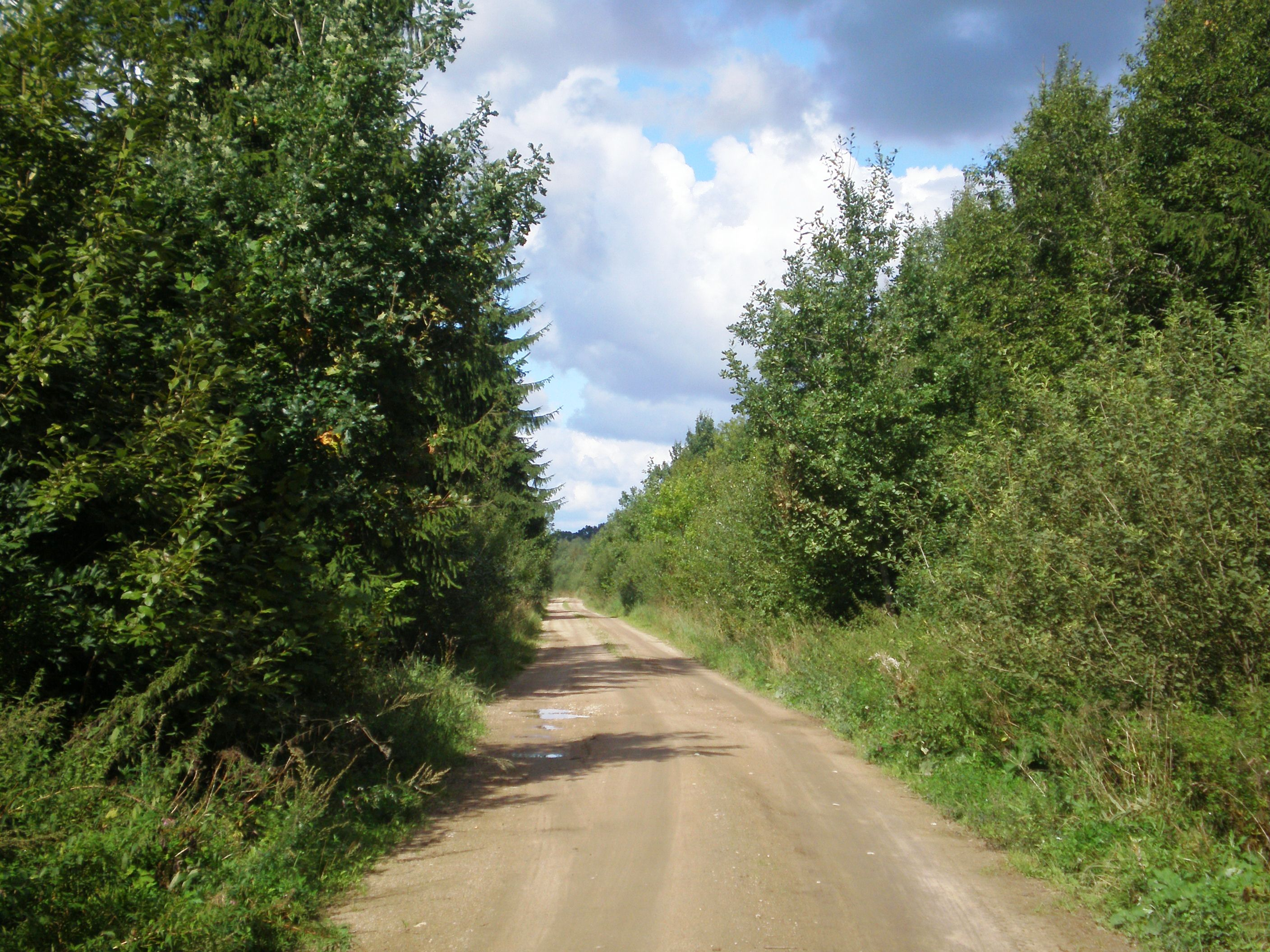
Pašušvys Forest - a part of the Lapkalnys–Paliepiai Forest

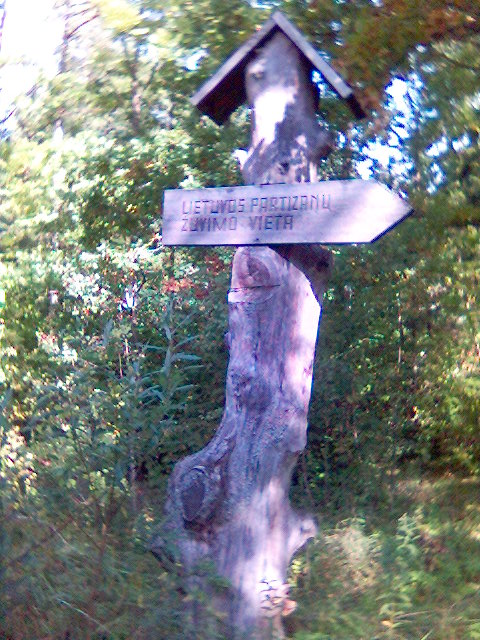
A wooden sign to the death place of Lithuanian resistants in Pašušvys Forest

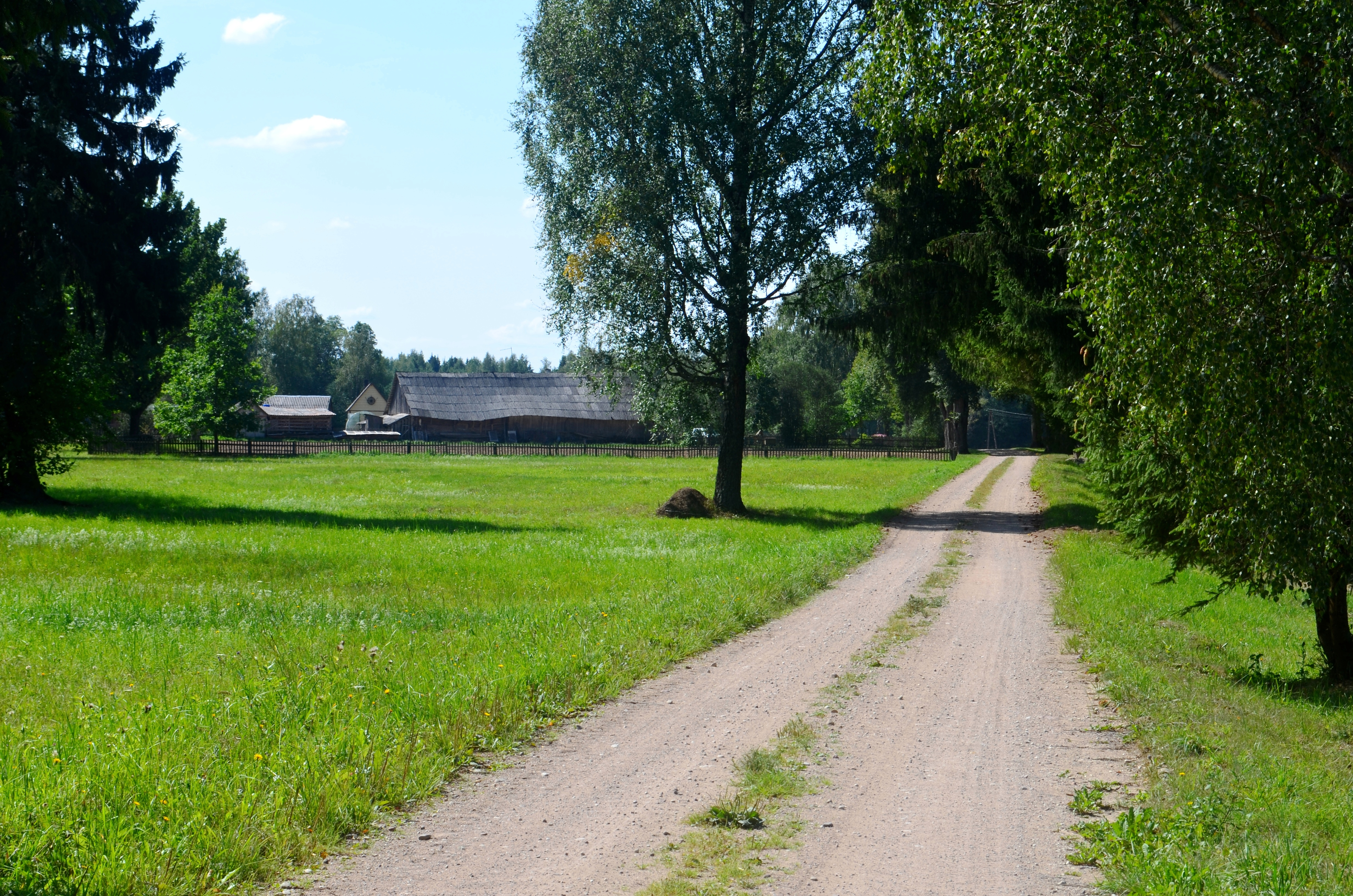
Lapkalnys village inside the forest
