= Norkūnai, Kėdainiai =

Norkūnai
- Village
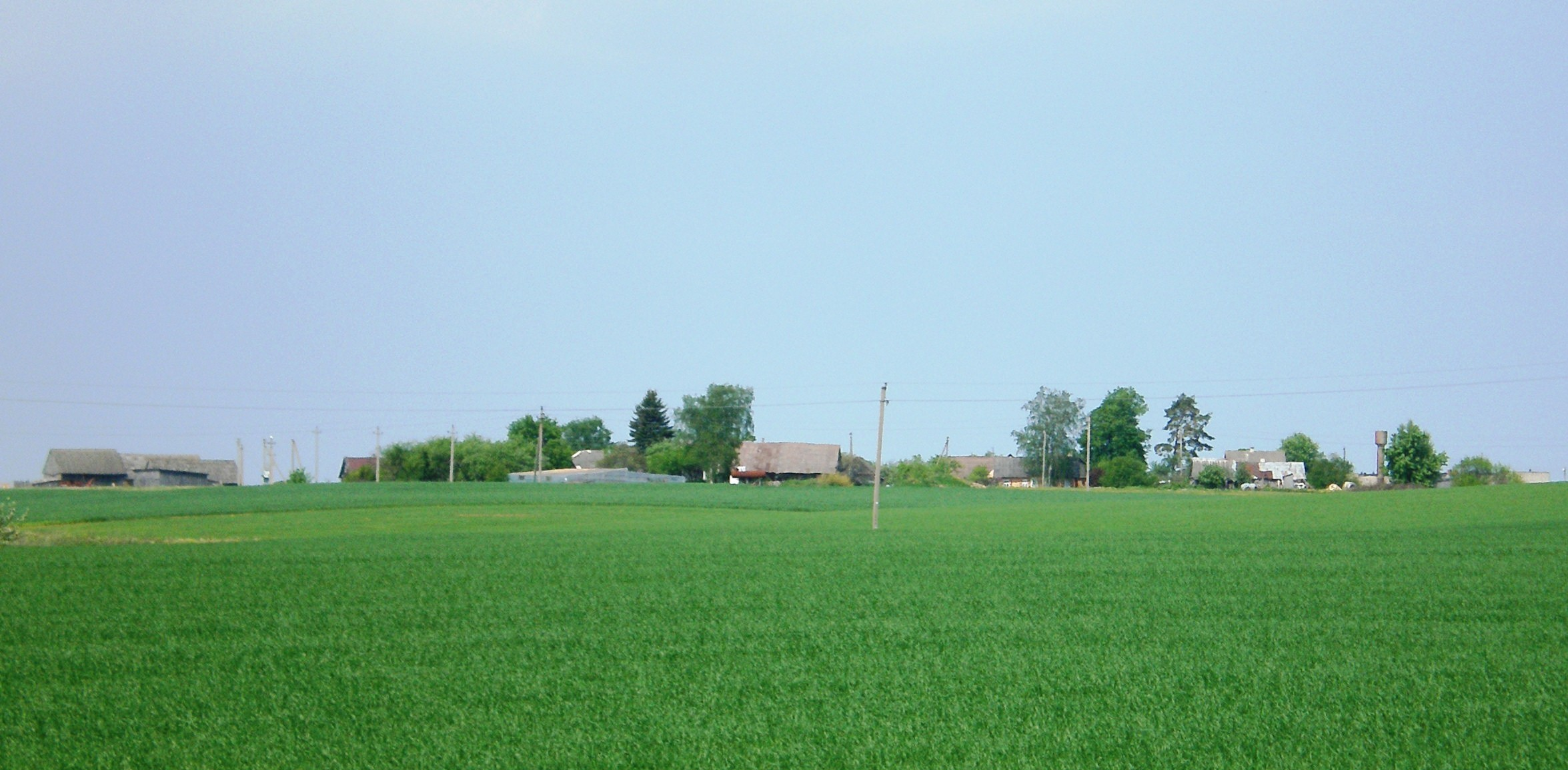

- Location in Lithuania Norkūnai (Lithuania)
- Coordinates: 55°24′00″N 23°42′22″E
- Country: Lithuania
- County: Kaunas County
- Municipality: Kėdainiai district municipality
- Eldership: Krakės Eldership

Population (2011)
  - Total: 21
- Time zone: UTC+2 (EET)
  - Summer (DST): UTC+3 (EEST)

Norkūnai (Russian: Наркуны, Polish: Narkuny) is a village in Kėdainiai district municipality, in Kaunas County, in central Lithuania. According to the 2011 census, the village had a population of 21 people. It is located 1.5 kilometres (0.93 mi) from Krakės, by the Dangaučius river.

== Demography ==
Historical population

Year	Pop.	±% p.a.
1902	95	—
1923	82	−0.70%
1959	47	−1.53%
1970	41	−1.23%

Year	Pop.	±% p.a.
1979	38	−0.84%
1989	19	−6.70%
2001	19	+0.00%
2011	21	+1.01%

Source: 1902, 1923, 1959 & 1970, 1979, 1989, 2001, 2011

== Notable people ==
- Alvydas Kanapinskas (1952–1991), one of the victims of the 13 January Events.

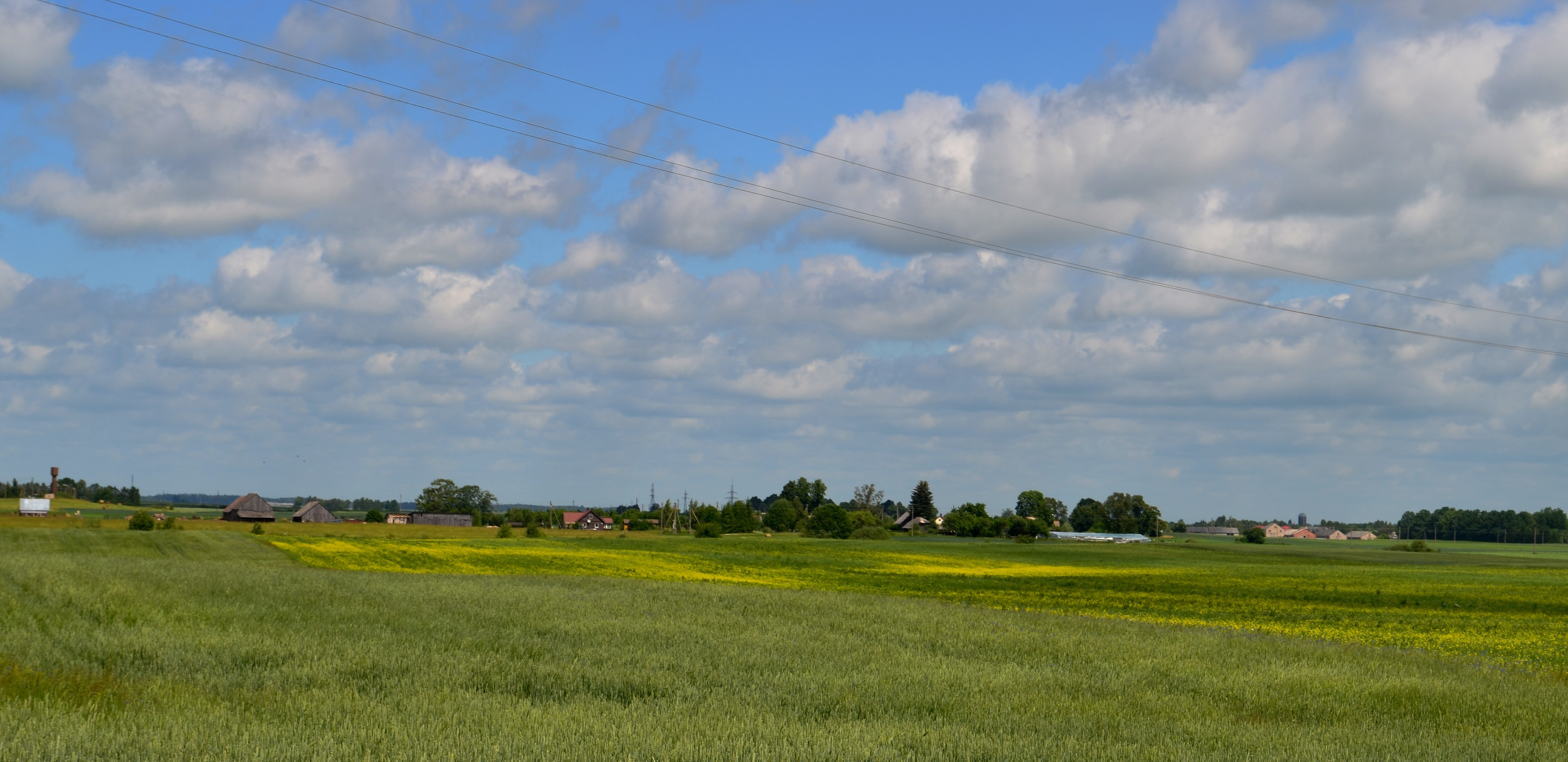
Norkūnai looking from Ąžuolytė
