= Meironiškėliai =

- Village
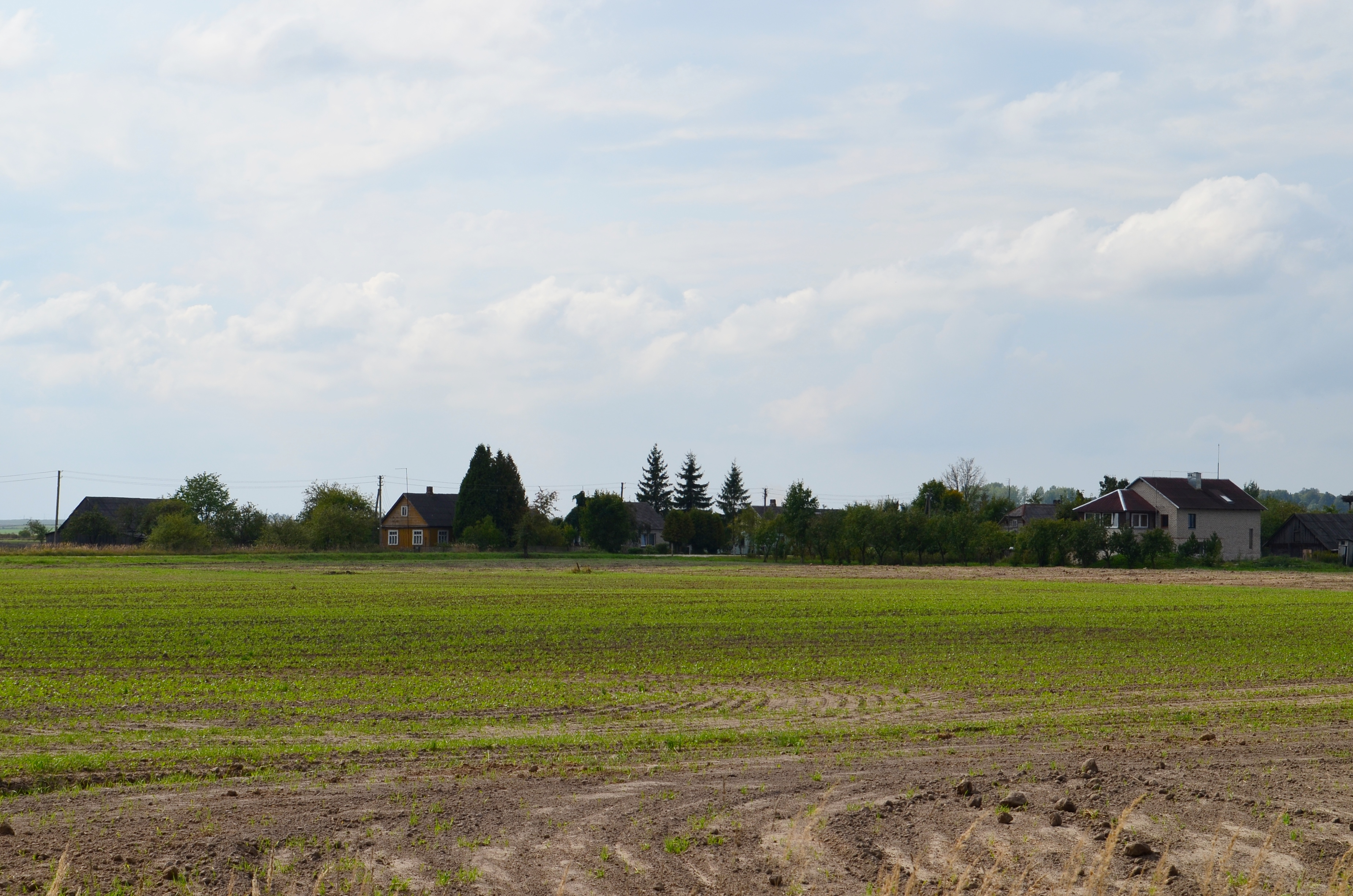

- Location in Lithuania Meironiškėliai (Lithuania)
- Coordinates: 55°22′41″N 23°45′11″E
- Country: Lithuania
- County: Kaunas County
- Municipality: Kėdainiai district municipality
- Eldership: Krakės Eldership

Population (2011)
  - Total: 18
- Time zone: UTC+2 (EET)
  - Summer (DST): UTC+3 (EEST)

Meironiškėliai (formerly Russian: Мейронишкели) is a village in Kėdainiai district municipality, in Kaunas County, in central Lithuania. According to the 2011 census, the village had a population of 18 people. It is located 3 kilometres (1.9 mi) from Krakės, 1 kilometre (0.62 mi) from Meironiškiai, between the Smilgaitis river and the Krakės-Dotnuva Forest.

== Demography ==
Historical population

Year	Pop.	±% p.a.
1902	111	—
1923	120	+0.37%
1959	66	−1.65%
1970	28	−7.50%

Year	Pop.	±% p.a.
1979	30	+0.77%
1989	24	−2.21%
2001	25	+0.34%
2011	18	−3.23%

Source: 1902, 1923, 1959 & 1970, 1979, 1989, 2001, 2011
