= Daržbalys =

- Village
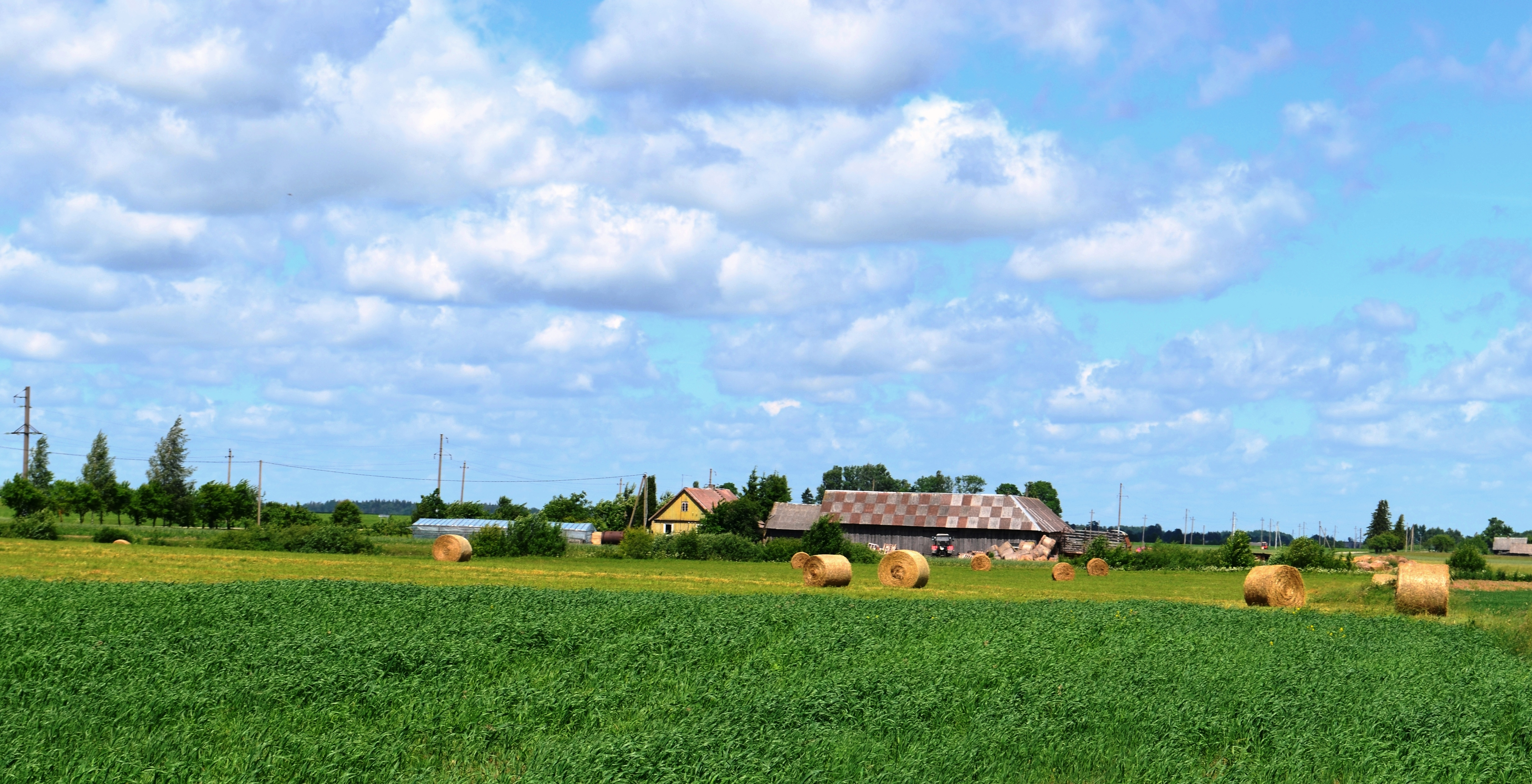

- Location in Lithuania Daržbalys (Lithuania)
- Coordinates: 55°25′45″N 23°44′20″E
- Country: Lithuania
- County: Kaunas County
- Municipality: Kėdainiai district municipality
- Eldership: Krakės Eldership

Population (2011)
  - Total: 0
- Time zone: UTC+2 (EET)
  - Summer (DST): UTC+3 (EEST)

Daržbalys (formerly Russian: Даржбали) is a village in Kėdainiai district municipality, in Kaunas County, in central Lithuania. According to the 2011 census, the village was uninhabited. It is located 3 kilometres (1.9 mi) from Krakės, by the northern boundary of Pakarkliai village. The Šernupis rivulet runs through the village.

The name means 'a puddle (bala) of a potager (daržas).'

== Demography ==
Historical population

Year	Pop.	±% p.a.
1902	52	—
1923	57	+0.44%
1959	39	−1.05%
1970	18	−6.79%

Year	Pop.	±% p.a.
1979	3	−18.05%
1989	2	−3.97%
2001	1	−5.61%
2011	0	−100.00%

Source: 1902, 1923, 1959 & 1970, 1979, 1989, 2001, 2011
