= Ruseiniai =

- Village
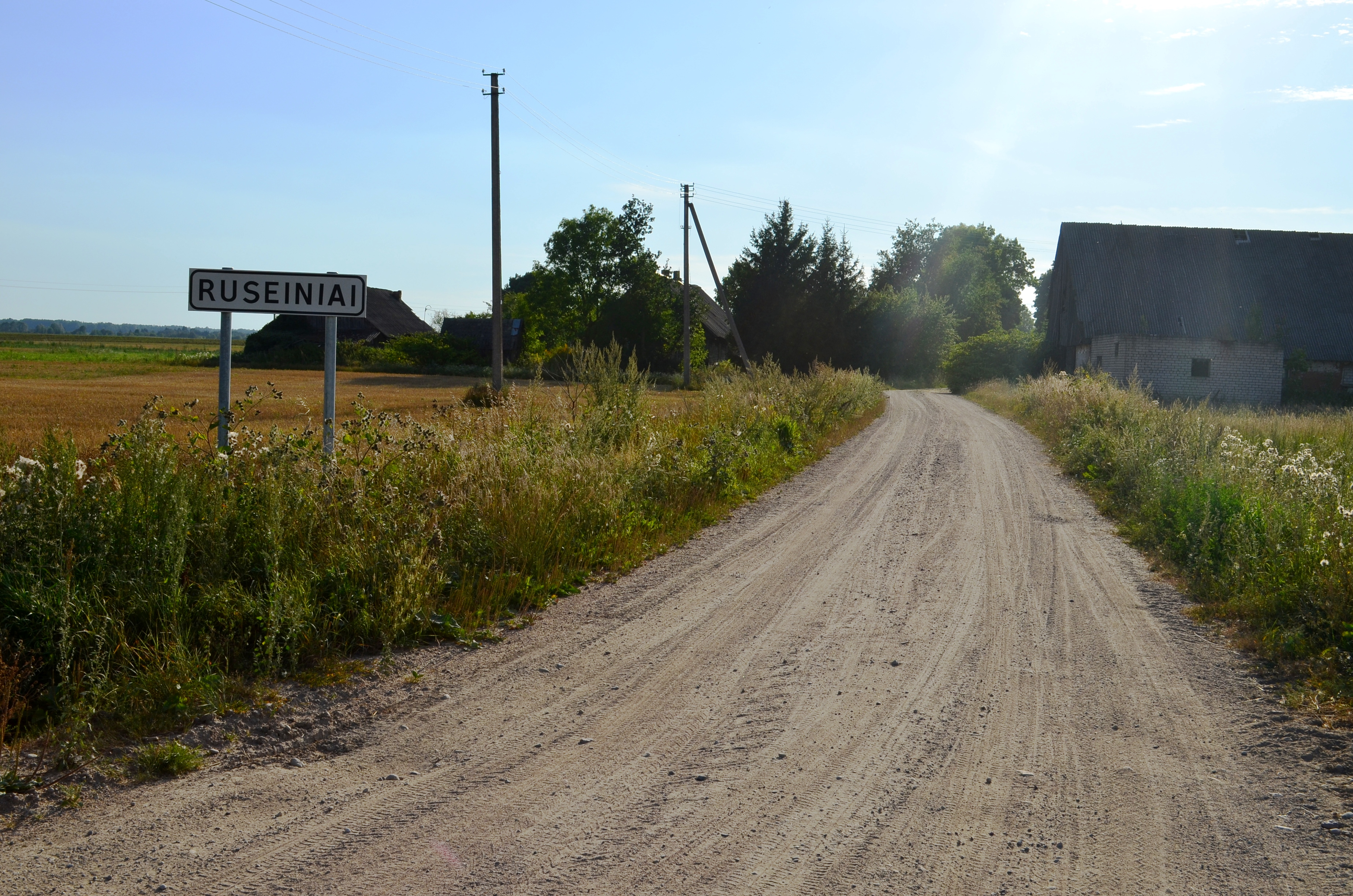

- Location in Lithuania Ruseiniai (Lithuania)
- Coordinates: 55°18′22″N 23°44′20″E
- Country: Lithuania
- County: Kaunas County
- Municipality: Kėdainiai district municipality
- Eldership: Josvainiai Eldership

Population (2011)
  - Total: 20
- Time zone: UTC+2 (EET)
  - Summer (DST): UTC+3 (EEST)

Ruseiniai (formerly Russian: Руссейни, Polish: Rusiańce) is a village in Kėdainiai district municipality, in Kaunas County, in central Lithuania. According to the 2011 census, the village had a population of 20 people. It is located 9 kilometres (5.6 mi) from Josvainiai, among the Šušvė (the Angiriai Reservoir), the Smilgaitis and the Amalis rivers, nearby the Josvainiai Forest.

There is an ancient burial place where relics of horses and men, dated by 11th-16th centuries, have been found.

== History ==
Ruseiniai has been known since 1595.

== Demography ==
Historical population

Year	Pop.	±% p.a.
1866	271	—
1902	308	+0.36%
1923	287	−0.34%
1959	192	−1.11%
1970	161	−1.59%

Year	Pop.	±% p.a.
1979	81	−7.35%
1986	43	−8.65%
1989	31	−10.33%
2001	27	−1.14%
2011	20	−2.96%

Source: 1902, 1923, 1959 & 1970, 1979, 1989, 2001, 2011

== Images ==
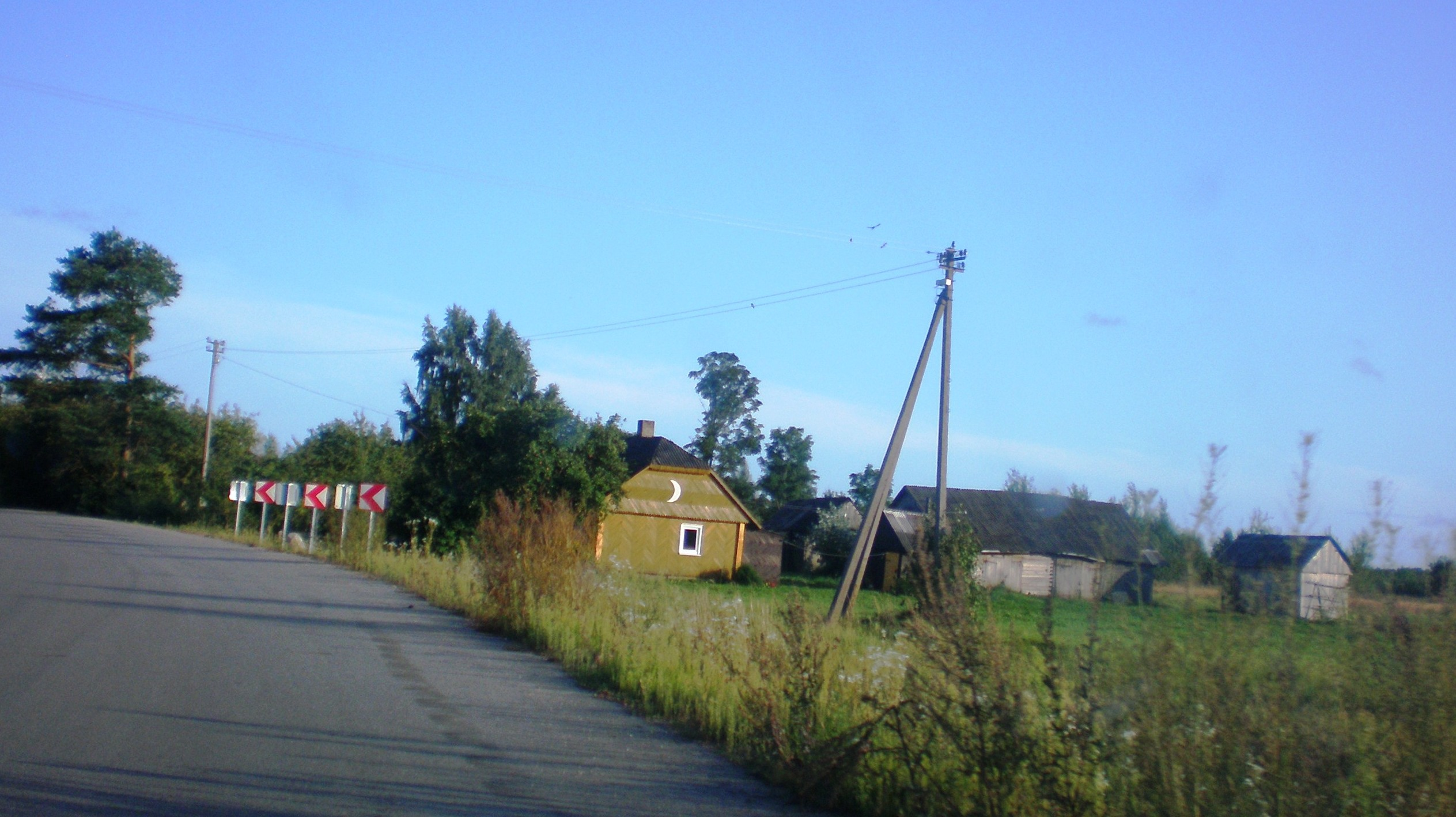
A house with a crescent moon

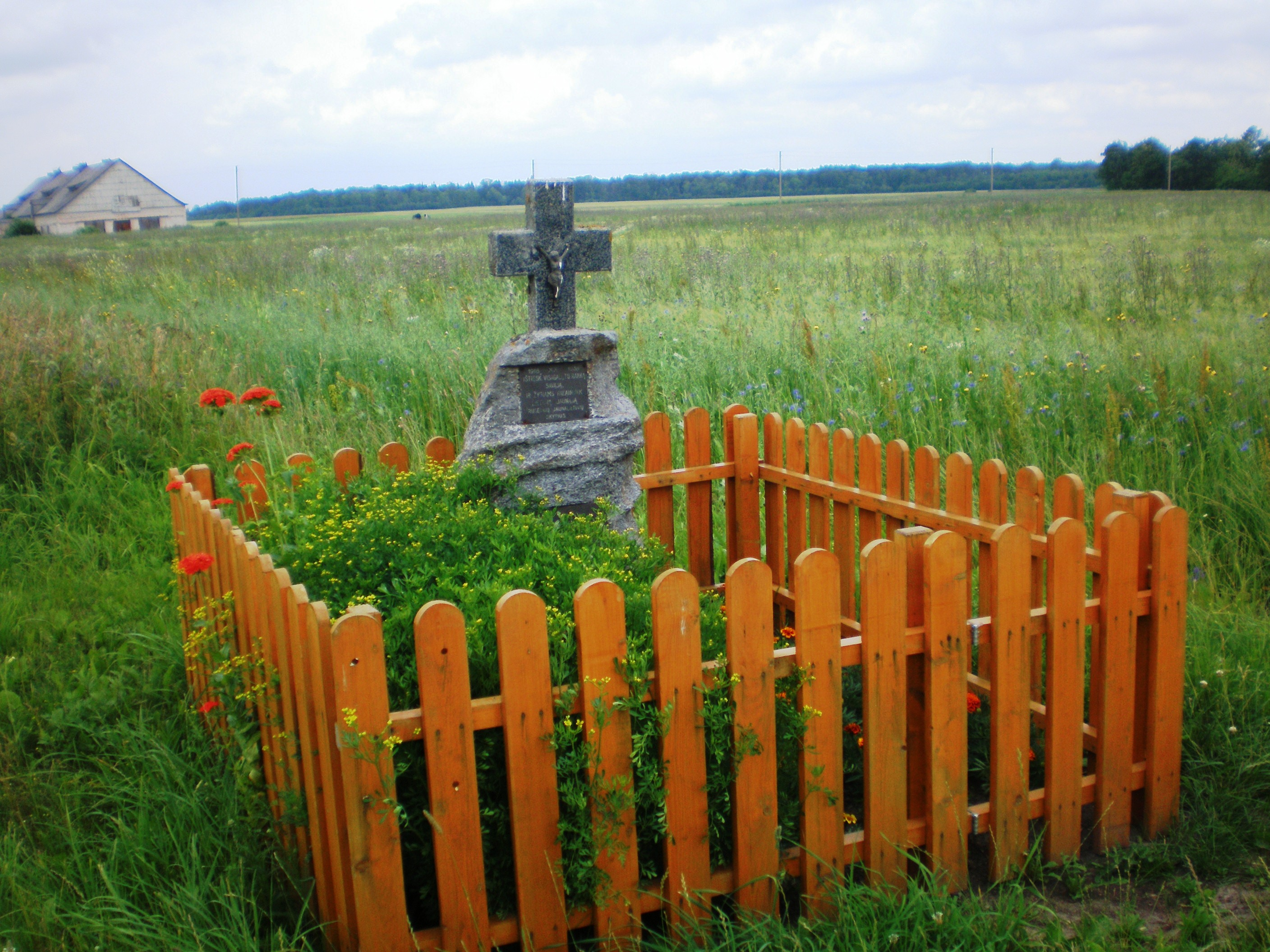
A cross by the "Young Lithuania" organization

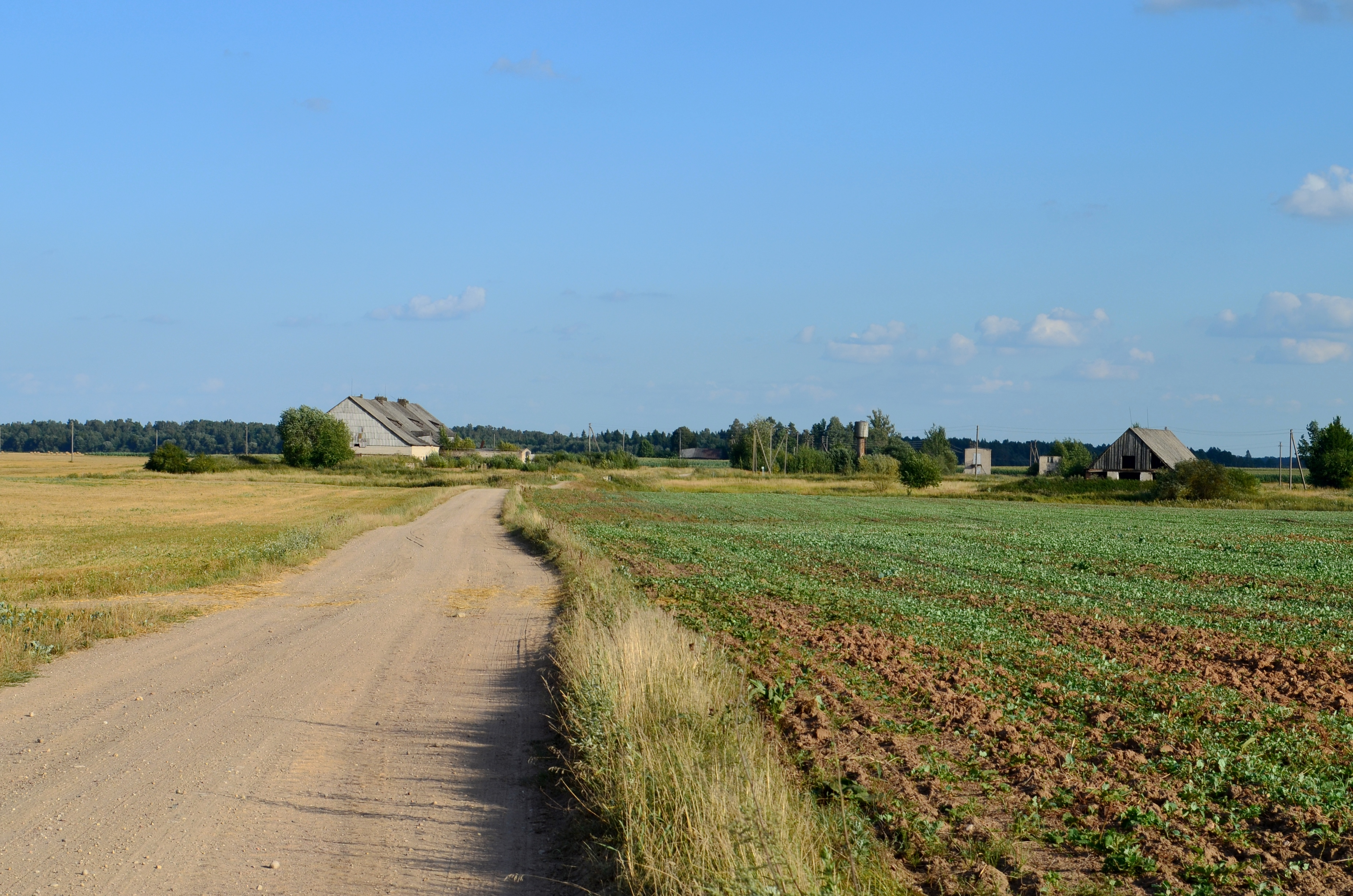
Agriculture buildings in Ruseiniai

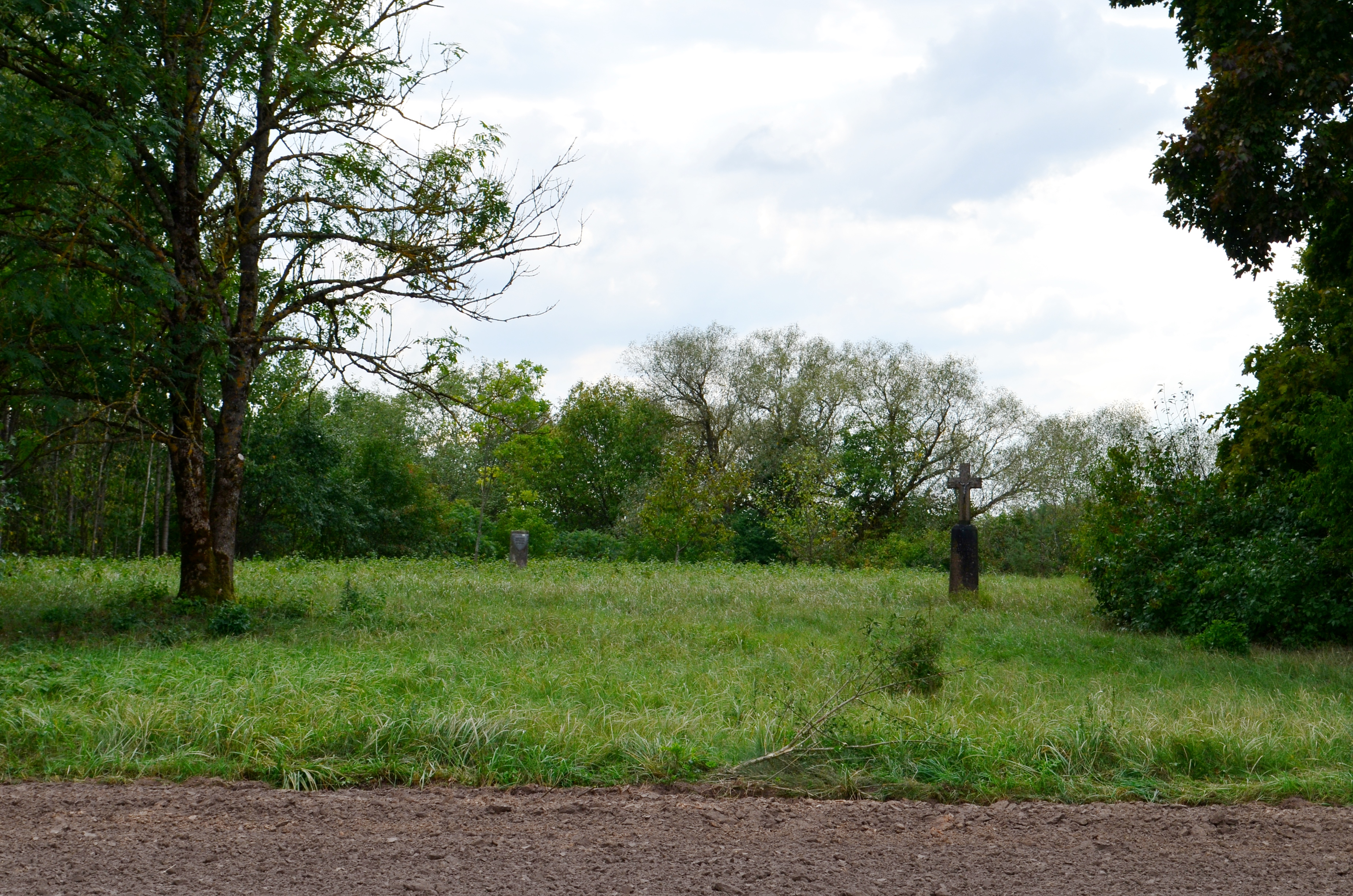
Ruseiniai burial place
