= Amalis =

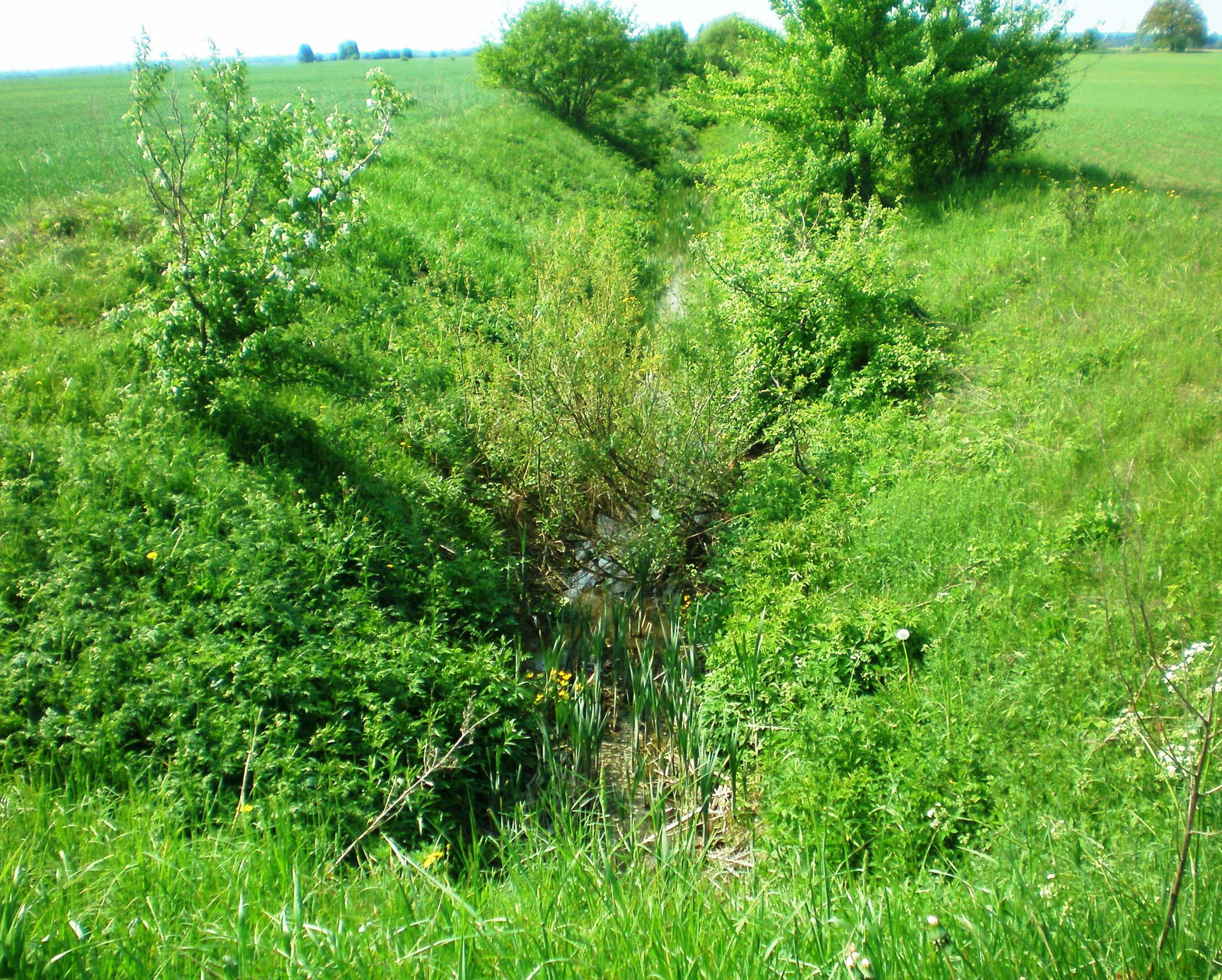
- Amalis upper course in Šmotiškėliai

Location
- Country: Lithuania
- Location: Kėdainiai district municipality, Kaunas County

Physical characteristics
- Source
  - location: Nearby Šmotiškiai
- Mouth: Smilgaitis in Grašva
  - coordinates: 55°17′52″N 23°47′26″E
- Length: 9.7 km (6.0 mi)
- Basin size: 10.8 km^{2} (4.2 sq mi)

Basin features
- Progression: Smilgaitis→ Smilga→ Nevėžis→ Neman→ Baltic Sea
- Tributaries
  - left: Amaliukas

The Amalis is a river of Kėdainiai district municipality, Kaunas County, central Lithuania. It flows for 9.7 kilometres (6.0 mi) and has a basin area of 10.8 km^{2} (4.2 sq mi). It is a right tributary of the river Smilgaitis.

It starts in agriculture fields near Šmotiškiai village and flows mostly eastwards till meets the Smilgaitis in Grašva village.

The name Amalis is of uncertain etymology. One version is that it could be derived from the Lithuanian word amalas ('mistletoe'), another version that it is of ancient origin and could be related with Albanian: amë ('river course'), Ancient Greek: ἀμάρα ('ditch'), Hittite: amiḭara- ('ditch').
