= Ąžuolytė =

- Village
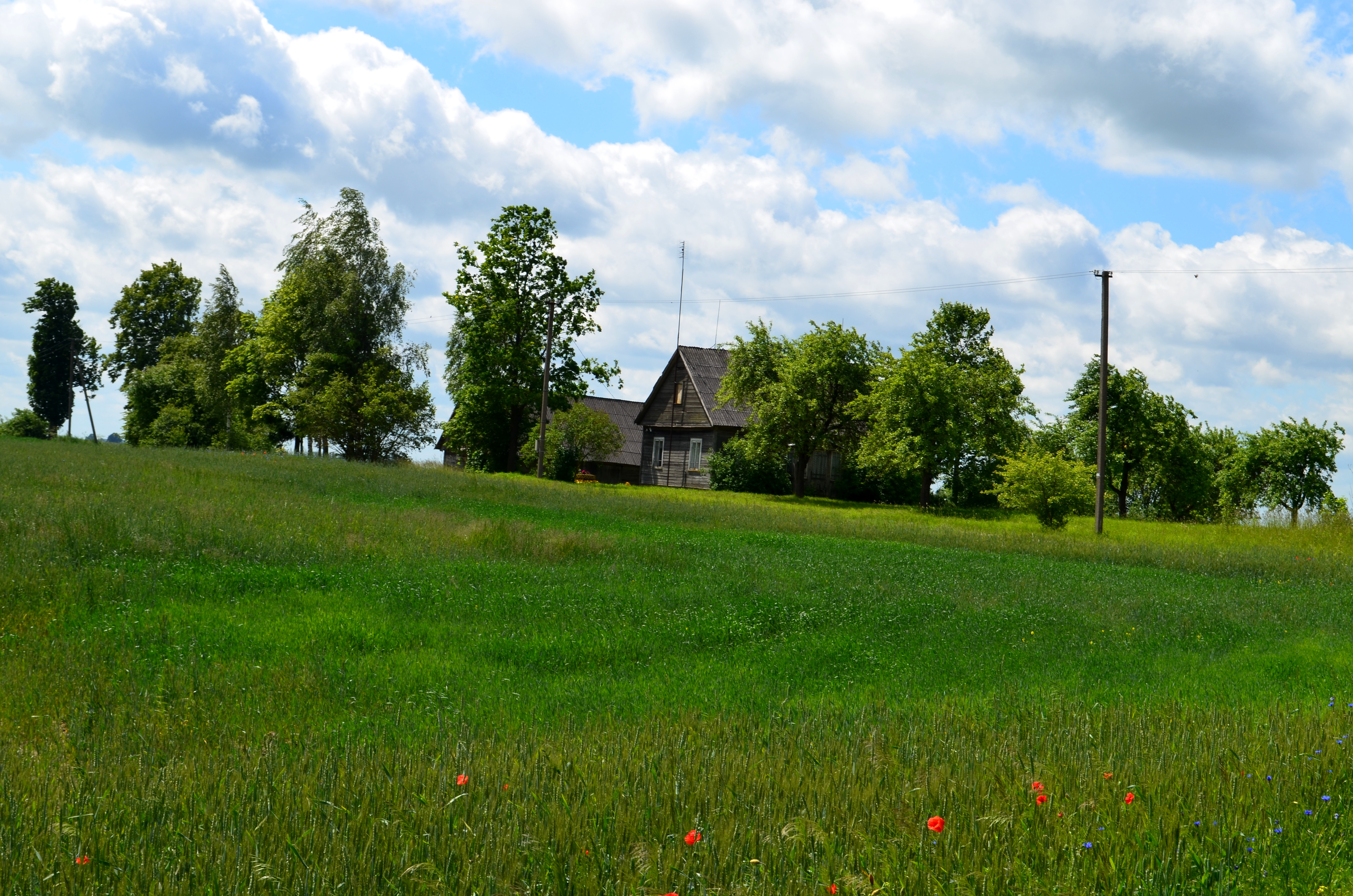

- Location in Lithuania Ąžuolytė (Lithuania)
- Coordinates: 55°23′10″N 23°42′11″E
- Country: Lithuania
- County: Kaunas County
- Municipality: Kėdainiai district municipality
- Eldership: Krakės Eldership

Population (2011)
  - Total: 8
- Time zone: UTC+2 (EET)
  - Summer (DST): UTC+3 (EEST)

Ąžuolytė ('a little place of oaks', formerly Russian: Ажолита, Ожолита) is a village in Kėdainiai district municipality, in Kaunas County, in central Lithuania. According to the 2011 census, the village had a population of 8 people. It is located 1 kilometre (0.62 mi) from Meironiškiai, on a ridge between the Dangaučius river and a little grove.

== Demography ==
Historical population

Year	Pop.	±% p.a.
1902	101	—
1923	75	−1.41%
1959	91	+0.54%
1970	79	−1.28%

Year	Pop.	±% p.a.
1979	59	−3.19%
1989	30	−6.54%
2001	29	−0.28%
2011	8	−12.08%

Source: 1902, 1923, 1959 & 1970, 1979, 1989, 2001, 2011

== Images ==
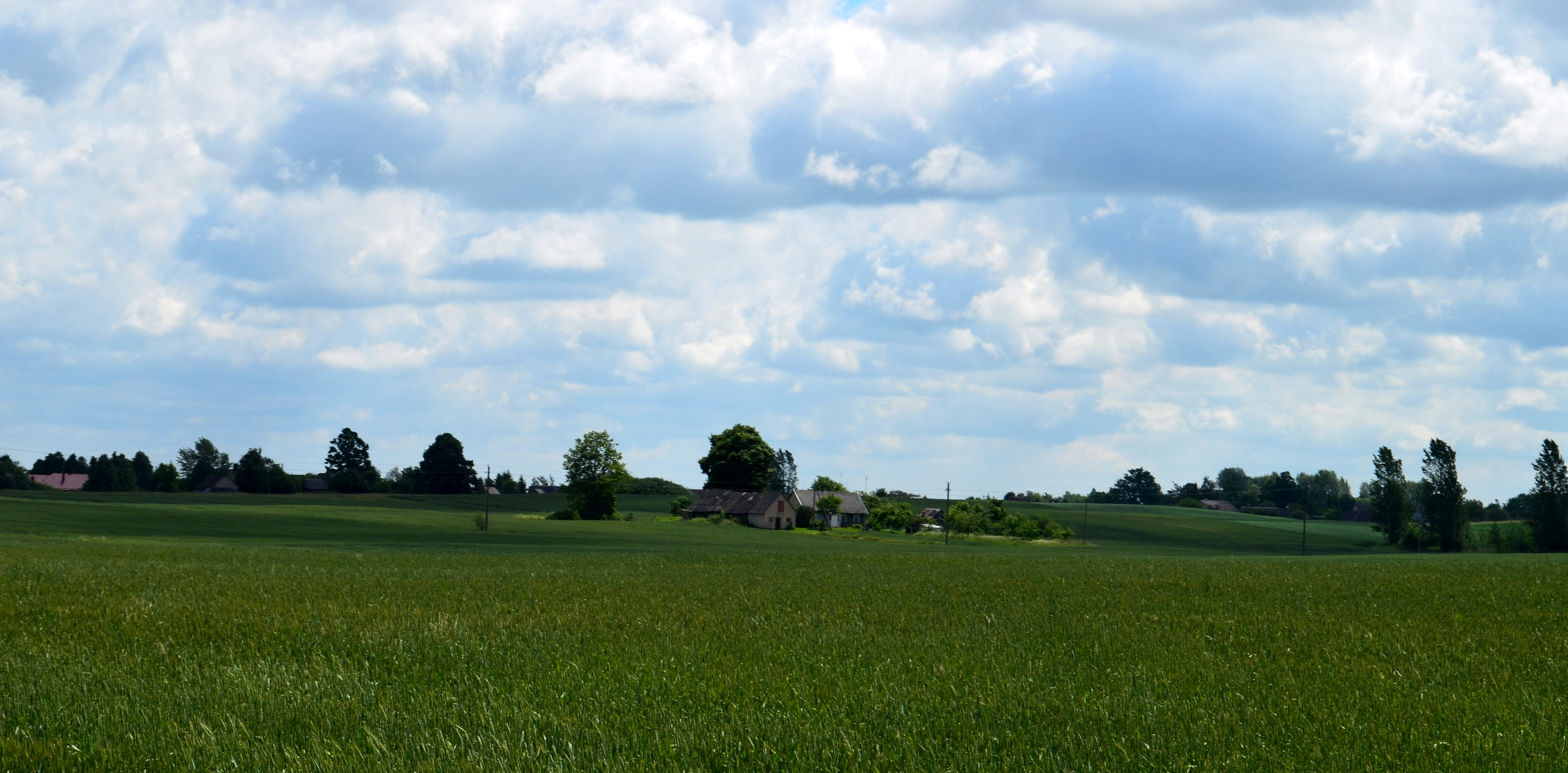
Ąžuolytė landscapes
