= Šmotiškėliai =

- Village
- Location in Lithuania Šmotiškėliai (Lithuania)
- Coordinates: 55°19′20″N 23°42′34″E
- Country: Lithuania
- County: Kaunas County
- Municipality: Kėdainiai district municipality
- Eldership: Krakės Eldership

Population (2011)
  - Total: 0
- Time zone: UTC+2 (EET)
  - Summer (DST): UTC+3 (EEST)

Šmotiškėliai is a village in Kėdainiai district municipality, in Kaunas County, in central Lithuania. According to the 2011 census, the village was uninhabited. It is located 3 kilometres (1.9 mi) from Pajieslys, 1.5 kilometres (0.93 mi) from Šmotiškiai, by the Amalis rivulet.

== Demography ==
Historical population

Year	Pop.	±% p.a.
1923	72	—
1959	45	−1.30%
1970	38	−1.53%
1979	7	−17.14%

Year	Pop.	±% p.a.
1989	0	−100.00%
2001	0	0.00%
2011	0	0.00%

Source: 1902, 1923, 1959 & 1970, 1979, 1989, 2001, 2011
