= Digraičiai =

- Village
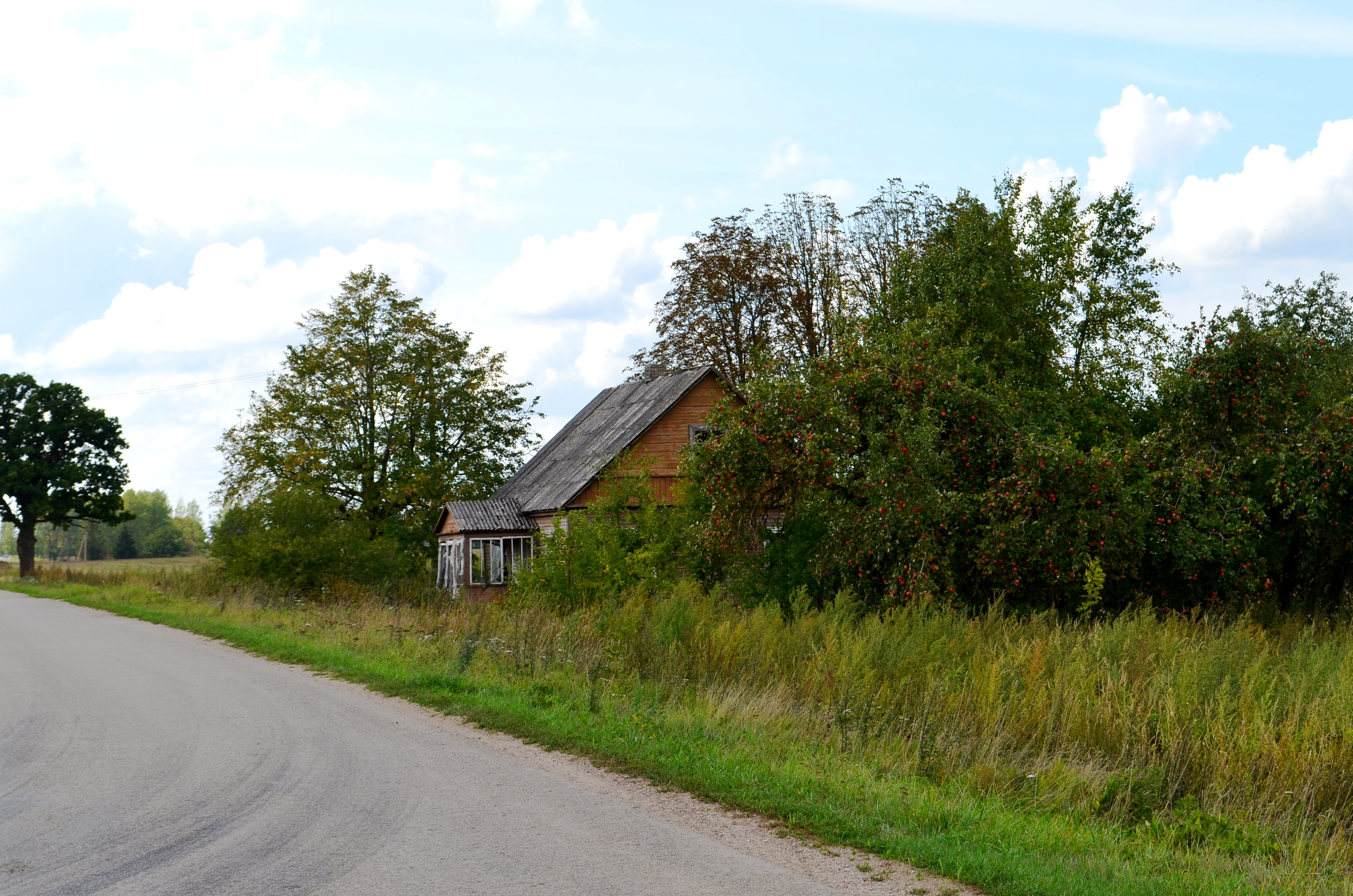

- Location in Lithuania Digraičiai (Lithuania)
- Coordinates: 55°24′29″N 23°40′08″E
- Country: Lithuania
- County: Kaunas County
- Municipality: Kėdainiai district municipality
- Eldership: Krakės Eldership

Population (2011)
  - Total: 9
- Time zone: UTC+2 (EET)
  - Summer (DST): UTC+3 (EEST)

Digraičiai (formerly Polish: Dygrajcie, Russian: Дыграйце) is a village in Kėdainiai district municipality, in Kaunas County, in central Lithuania. According to the 2011 census, the village had a population of 9 people. It is located 4 kilometres (2.5 mi) from Krakės, nearby the source of the Smilgaitis river. There are a magazin (an old warehouse), an underground water monitoring station, a place of the former manor.

At the beginning of the 20th century there were Digraičiai village and estate.

== Demography ==
Historical population

Year	Pop.	±% p.a.
1902	74	—
1923	66	−0.54%
1959	112	+1.48%
1970	68	−4.43%

Year	Pop.	±% p.a.
1979	50	−3.36%
1989	26	−6.33%
2001	11	−6.92%
2011	9	−1.99%

Source: 1902, 1923, 1959 & 1970, 1979, 1989, 2001, 2011

== Images ==
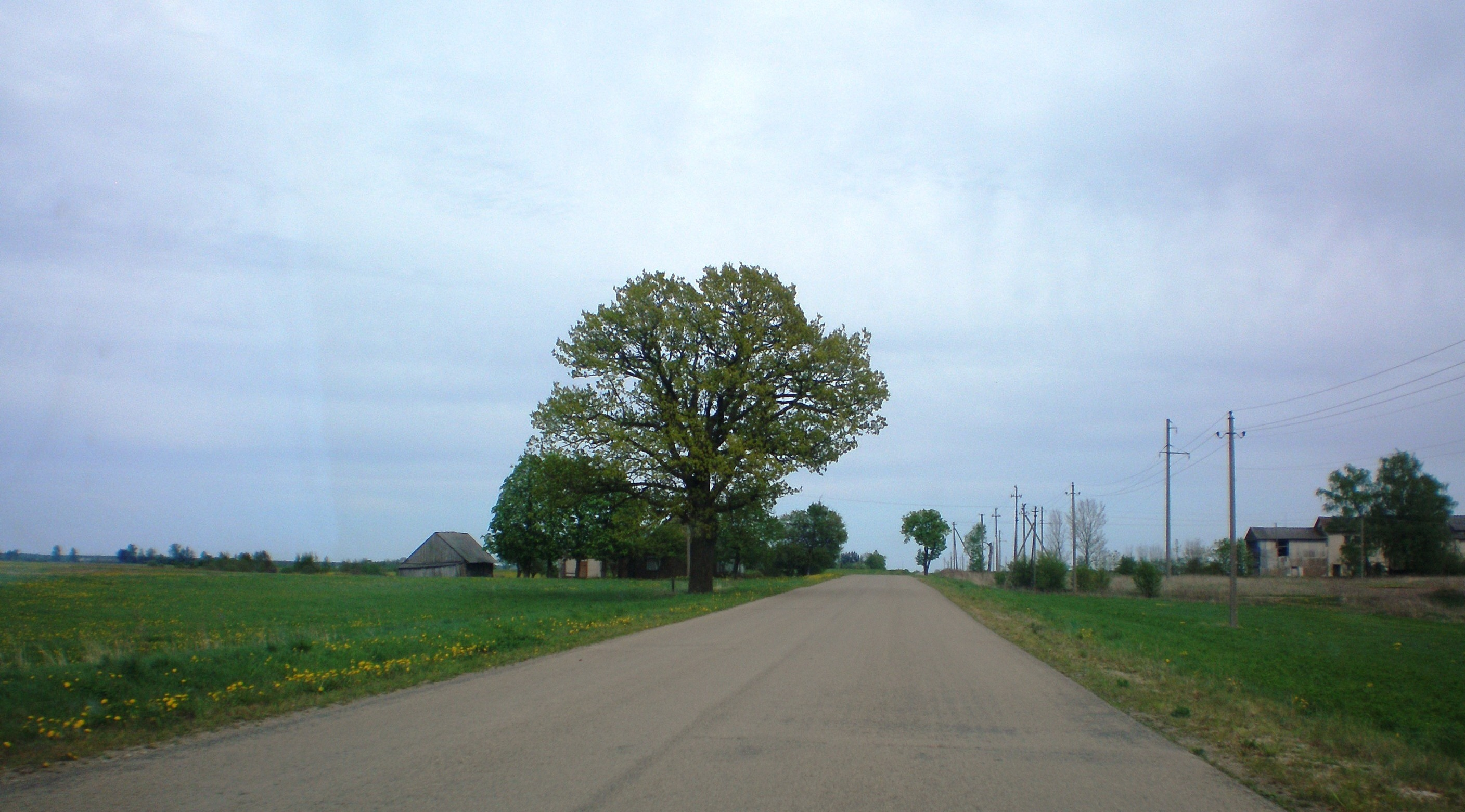
Digraičiai by the Krakės-Betygala road

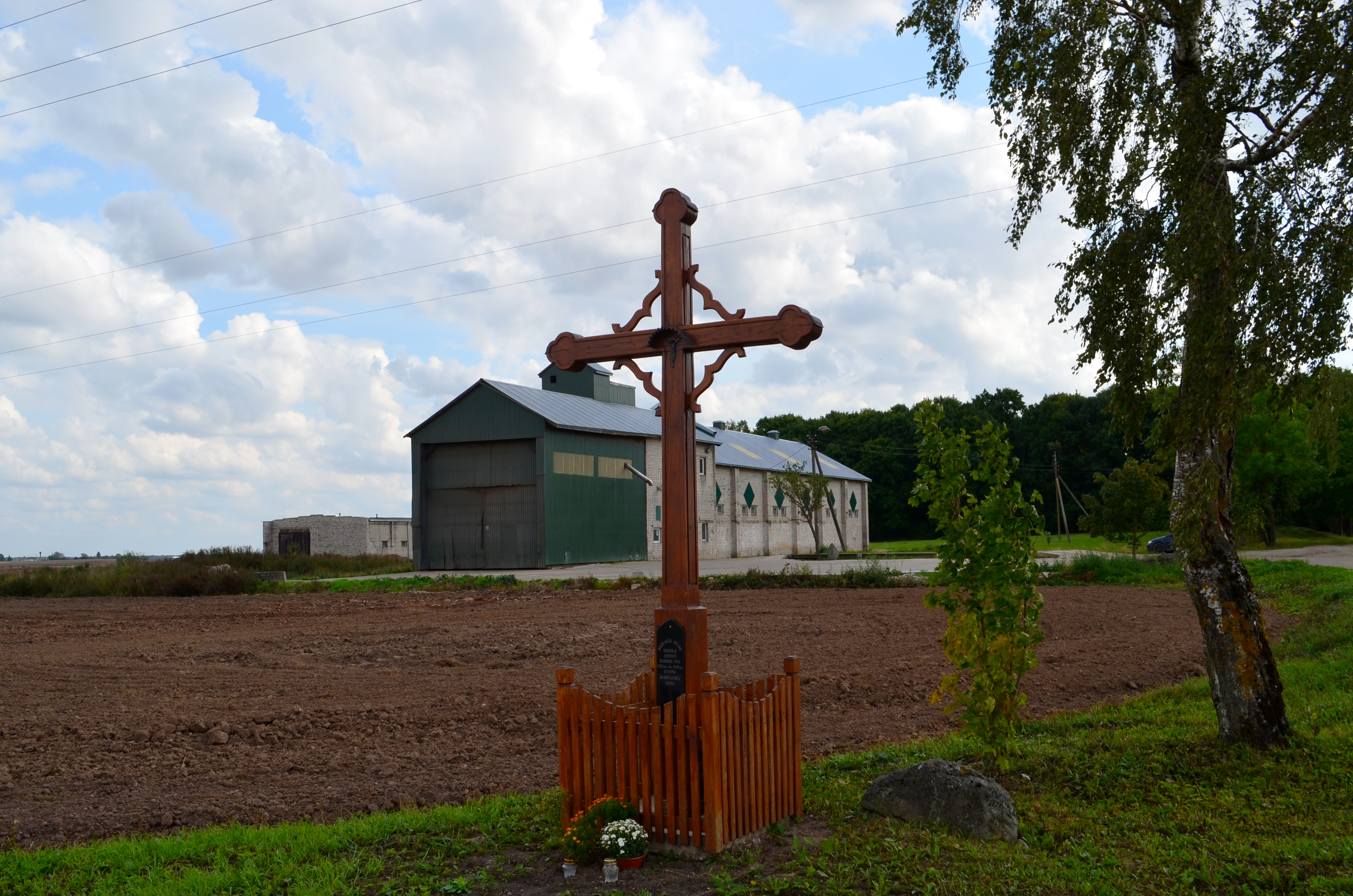
A cross for the former Digraičiai manor
