= Slabada, Kėdainiai =

Slabada
- Village
- Location in Lithuania Slabada (Lithuania)
- Coordinates: 55°25′52″N 23°38′31″E
- Country: Lithuania
- County: Kaunas County
- Municipality: Kėdainiai district municipality
- Eldership: Krakės Eldership

Population (2011)
  - Total: 0
- Time zone: UTC+2 (EET)
  - Summer (DST): UTC+3 (EEST)

Slabada (formerly Russian: Слобода, Polish: Słoboda, see sloboda) is a village in Kėdainiai district municipality, in Kaunas County, in central Lithuania. According to the 2011 census, the village was uninhabited. It is located 2 kilometres (1.2 mi) from Pašušvys, by the Šušvė river, nearby the Lapkalnys-Paliepiai Forest.

== History ==
At the beginning of the 20th century here was a folwark of the Digraičiai manor.

== Demography ==
Historical population

Year	Pop.	±% p.a.
1902	20	—
1923	32	+2.26%
1959	37	+0.40%
1970	38	+0.24%

Year	Pop.	±% p.a.
1979	15	−9.81%
1989	0	−100.00%
2001	0	0.00%
2011	0	0.00%

Source: 1902, 1923, 1959 & 1970, 1979, 1989, 2001, 2011

== Notable people ==
- Valdas Sirutkaitis (b. 1952), Lithuanian physicist.
