= Pakarkliai =

- Village
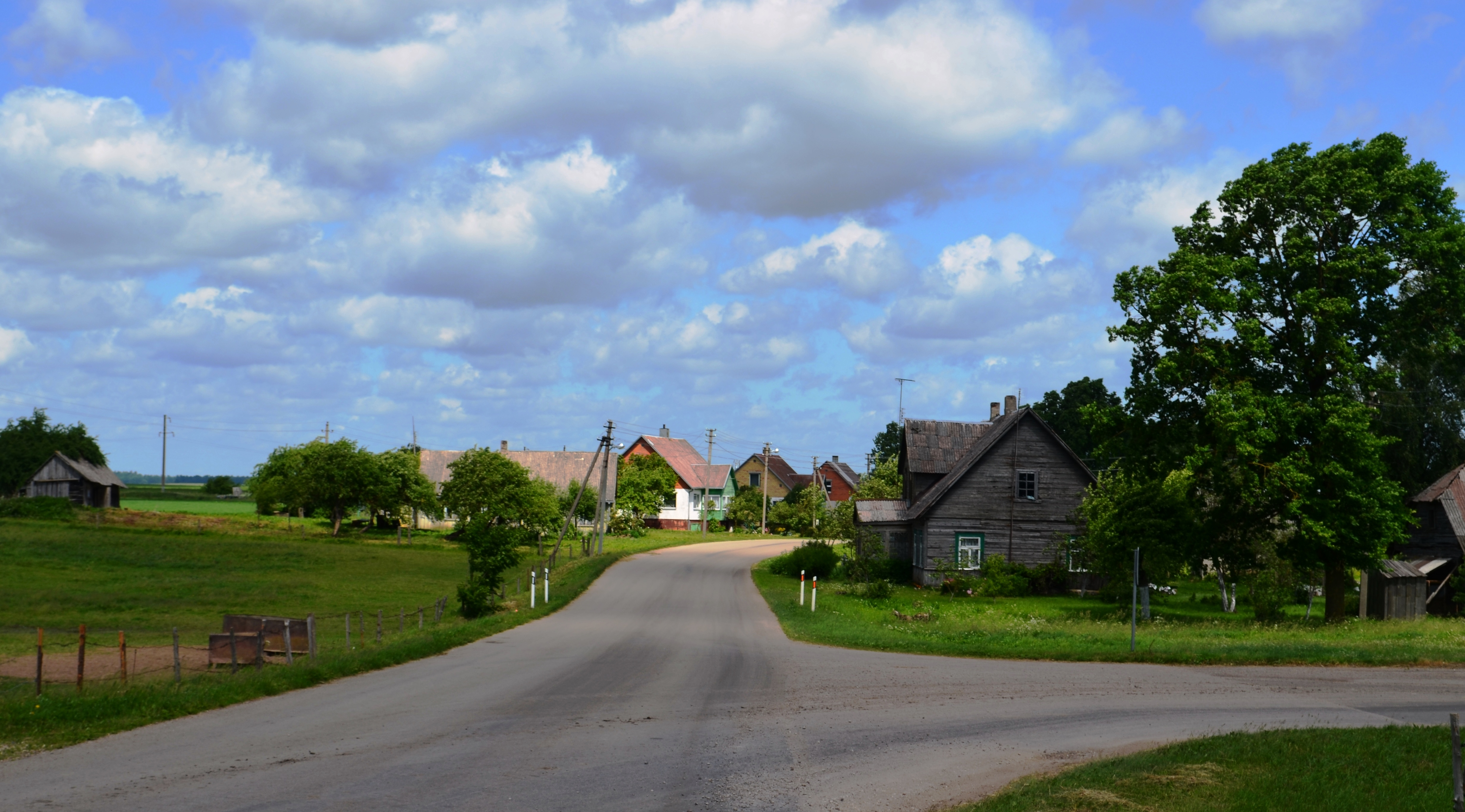

- Location in Lithuania Pakarkliai (Lithuania)
- Coordinates: 55°25′19″N 23°43′52″E
- Country: Lithuania
- County: Kaunas County
- Municipality: Kėdainiai district municipality
- Eldership: Krakės Eldership

Population (2011)
  - Total: 67
- Time zone: UTC+2 (EET)
  - Summer (DST): UTC+3 (EEST)

Pakarkliai (formerly Russian: Покаркли, Polish: Pokarkle) is a village in Kėdainiai district municipality, in Kaunas County, in central Lithuania. According to the 2011 census, the village had a population of 67 people. It is located 0.5 kilometres (0.31 mi) from Krakės, by the Krakės-Gudžiūnai road. There are warehouses and technical areas of the Krakės Agriculture Cooperative.

== History ==
Pakarkliai is known since 1590.

== Demography ==
Historical population

Year	Pop.	±% p.a.
1866	199	—
1902	225	+0.34%
1923	131	−2.54%
1959	138	+0.14%
1970	138	+0.00%

Year	Pop.	±% p.a.
1979	69	−7.41%
1986	67	−0.42%
1989	63	−2.03%
2001	88	+2.82%
2011	67	−2.69%

Source: 1902, 1923, 1959 & 1970, 1979, 1989, 2001, 2011

== Images ==
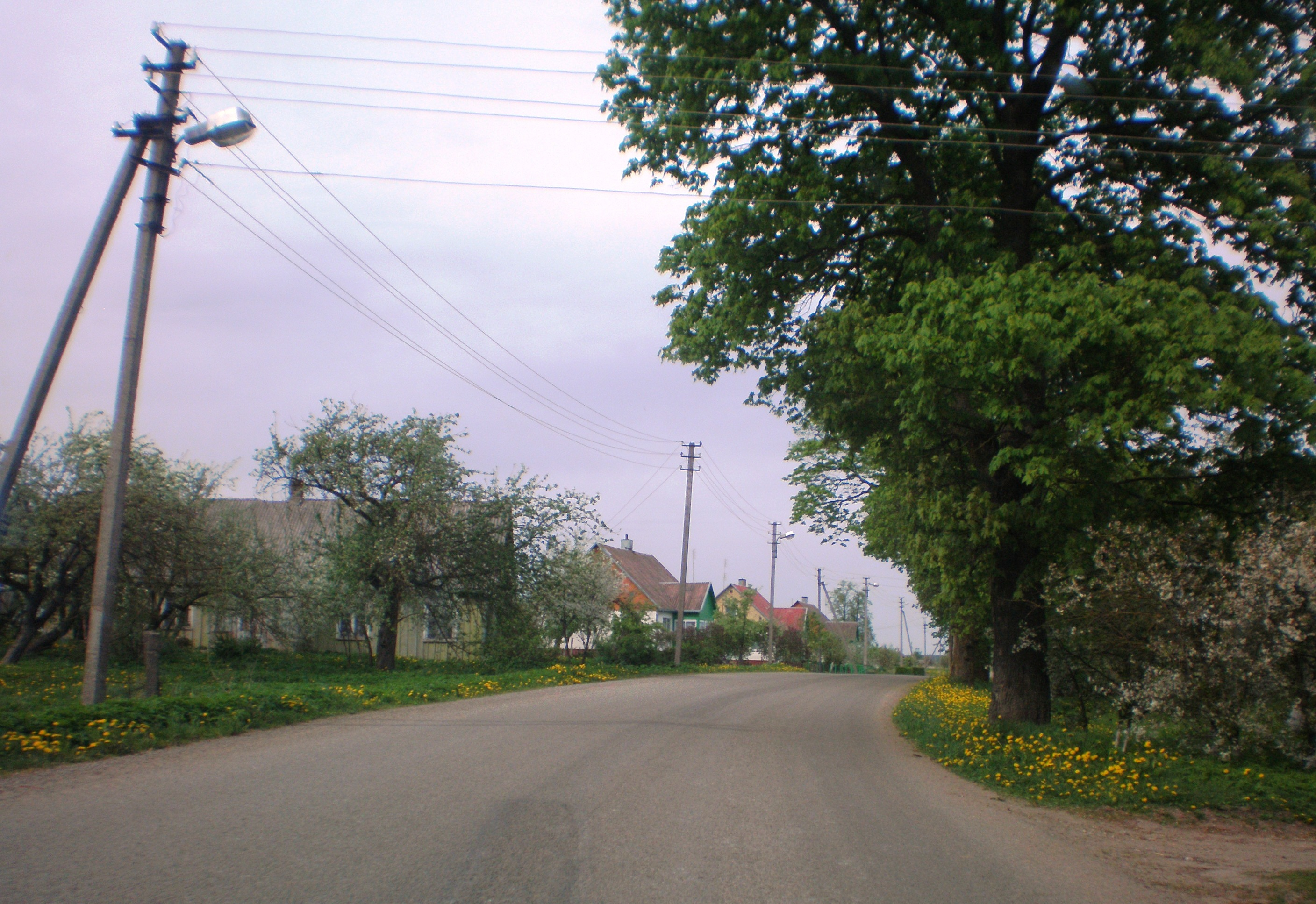
Main street

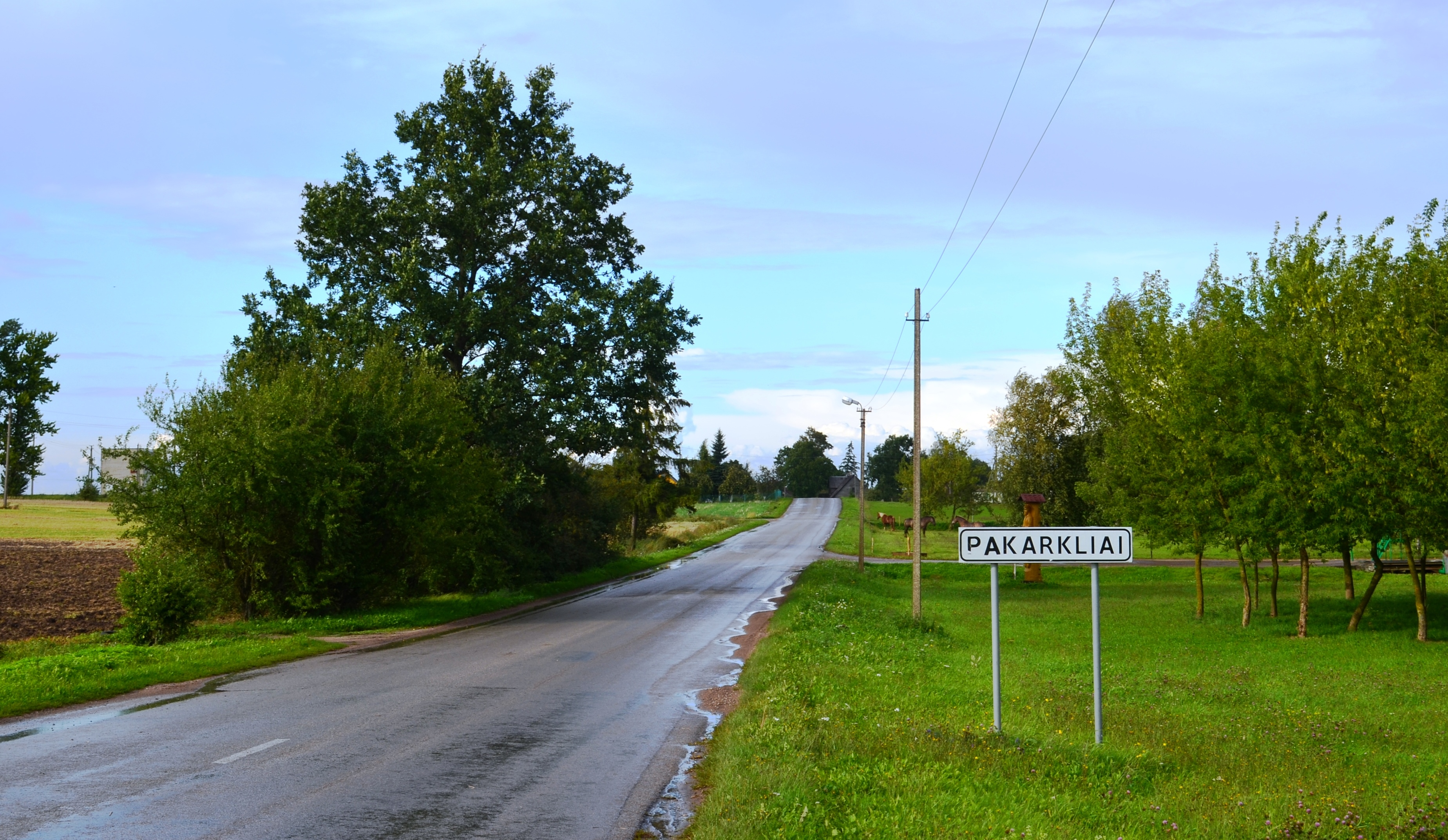
Entrance from Krakės

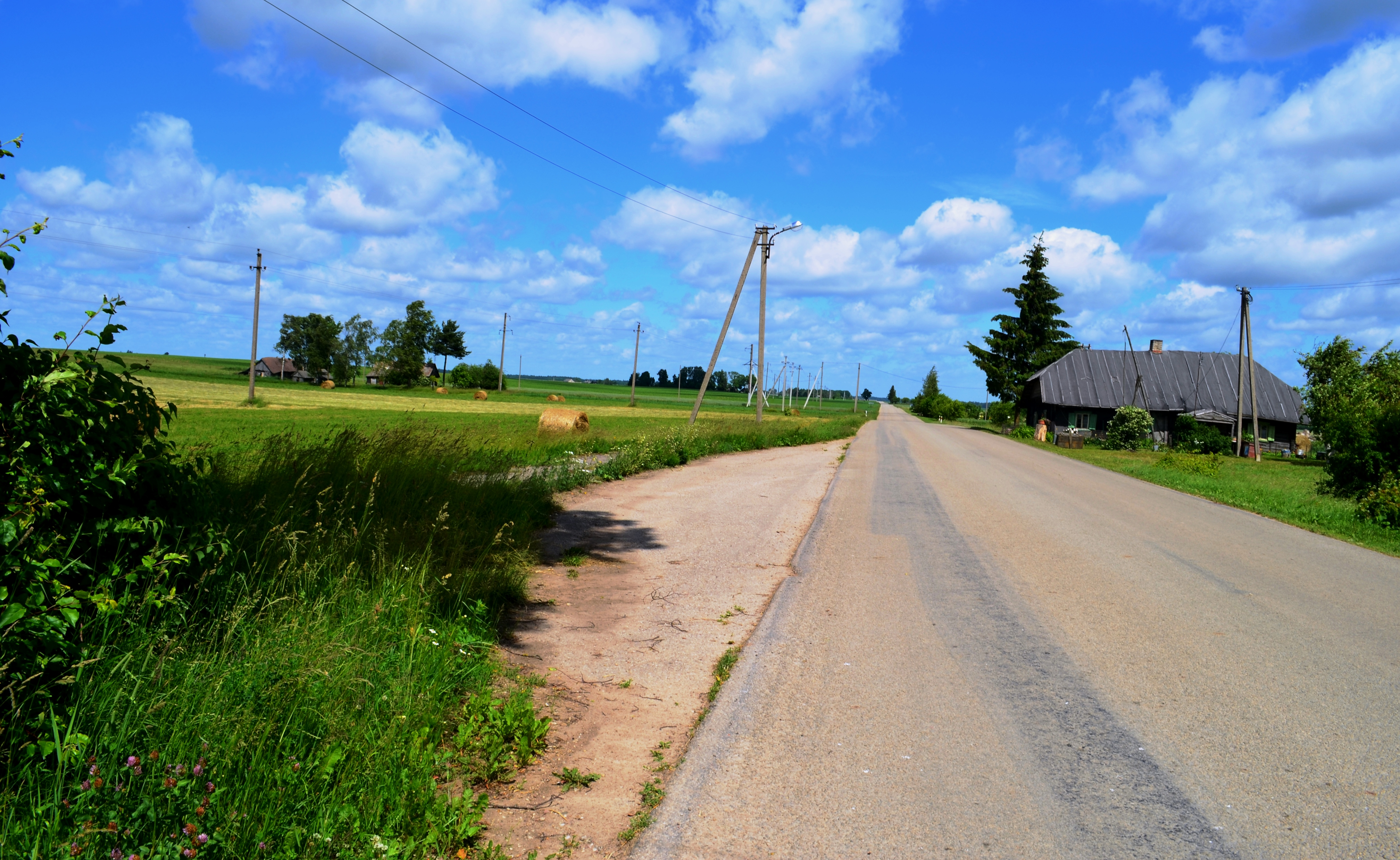
Old house
