= Stasiūnai, Kėdainiai =

Stasiūnai
- Village
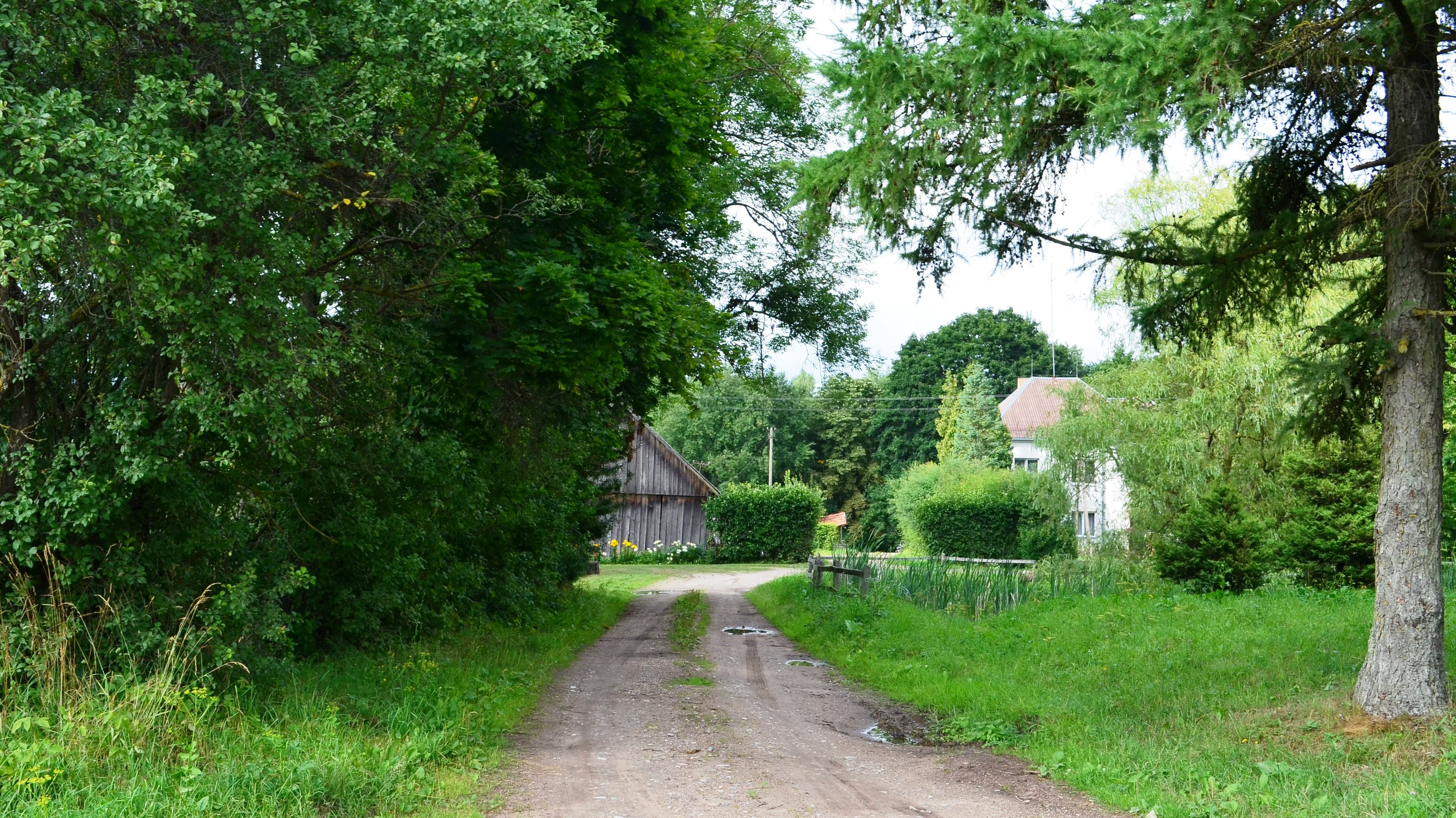

- Location in Lithuania
- Coordinates: 55°17′30″N 23°53′15″E
- Country: Lithuania
- County: Kaunas County
- Municipality: Kėdainiai district municipality
- Eldership: Kėdainiai City Eldership

Population (2011)
  - Total: 19
- Time zone: UTC+2 (EET)
  - Summer (DST): UTC+3 (EEST)

Stasiūnai is a village in Kėdainiai district municipality, in Kaunas County, in central Lithuania. It is located by the Smilgaitis river and Keleriškiai pond, nearby Josvainiai forest. According to the 2011 census, the village has a population of 19 people. There is a "Ąžuolotas" forestry in the village.

== Demography ==
Historical population

Year	Pop.	±% p.a.
1959	46	—
1970	41	−1.04%
1979	24	−5.78%

Year	Pop.	±% p.a.
1989	21	−1.33%
2001	20	−0.41%
2011	19	−0.51%

Source: 1902, 1923, 1959 & 1970, 1979, 1989, 2001, 2011
