= Grašva =

- Village
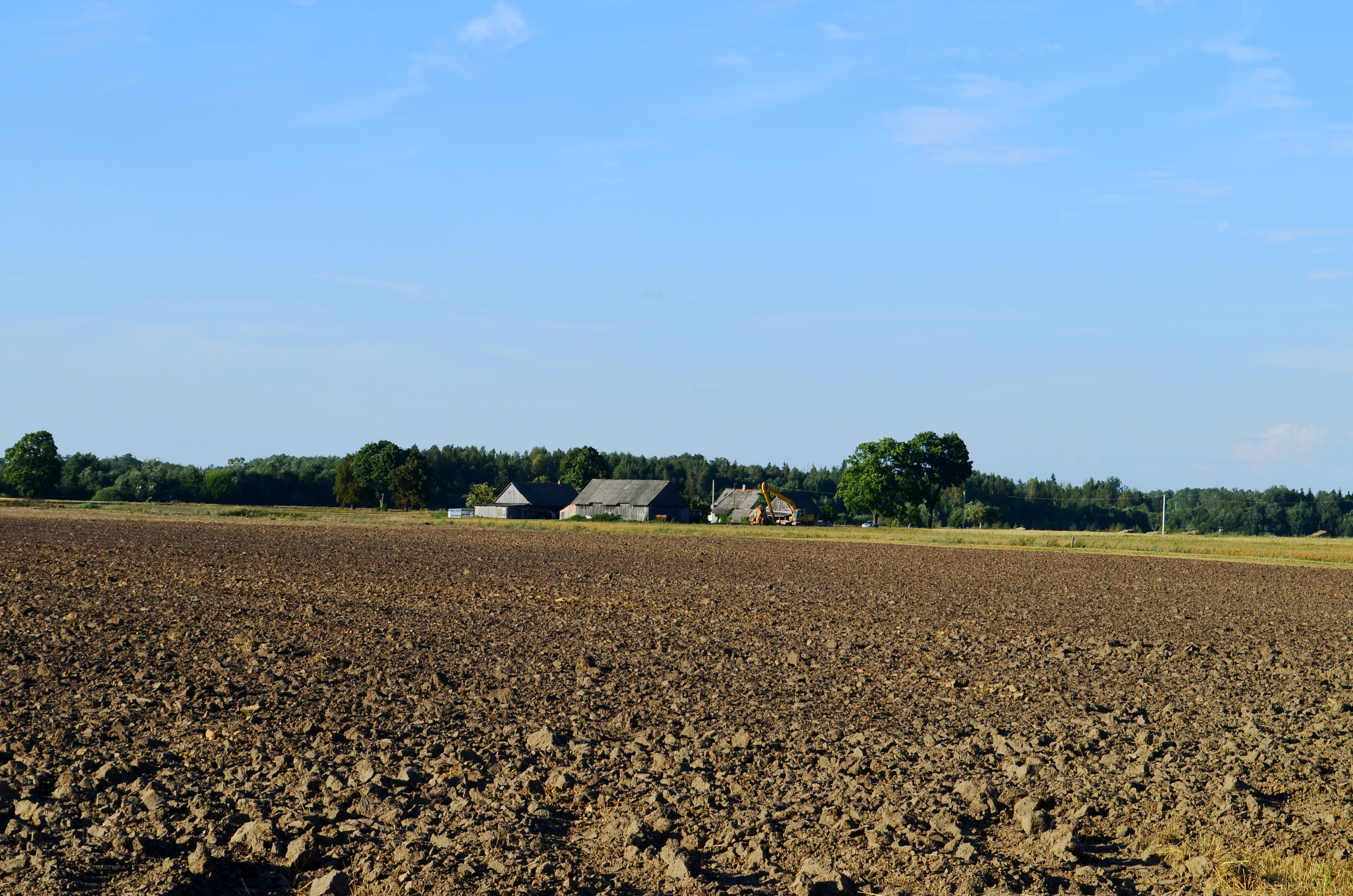

- Location in Lithuania Grašva (Lithuania)
- Coordinates: 55°17′31″N 23°47′20″E
- Country: Lithuania
- County: Kaunas County
- Municipality: Kėdainiai district municipality
- Eldership: Josvainiai Eldership

Population (2011)
  - Total: 1
- Time zone: UTC+2 (EET)
  - Summer (DST): UTC+3 (EEST)

Grašva (formerly Russian: Гроншва, Гроншвы, Polish: Gronszwy) is a village in Kėdainiai district municipality, in Kaunas County, in central Lithuania. According to the 2011 census, the village had a population of 1 person. It is located 3 kilometres (1.9 mi) from Angiriai, by the Žiedupė river, at the edge of the Josvainiai Forest.

== Demography ==
Historical population

| Year | Pop. | ±% p.a. |
|---|---|---|
| 1902 | 66 | — |
| 1923 | 115 | +2.68% |
| 1959 | 55 | −2.03% |
| 1970 | 53 | −0.34% |

| Year | Pop. | ±% p.a. |
|---|---|---|
| 1979 | 29 | −6.48% |
| 1989 | 7 | −13.25% |
| 2001 | 6 | −1.28% |
| 2011 | 1 | −16.40% |

Source: 1902, 1923, 1959 & 1970, 1979, 1989, 2001, 2011
