= Šmotiškiai =

- Village
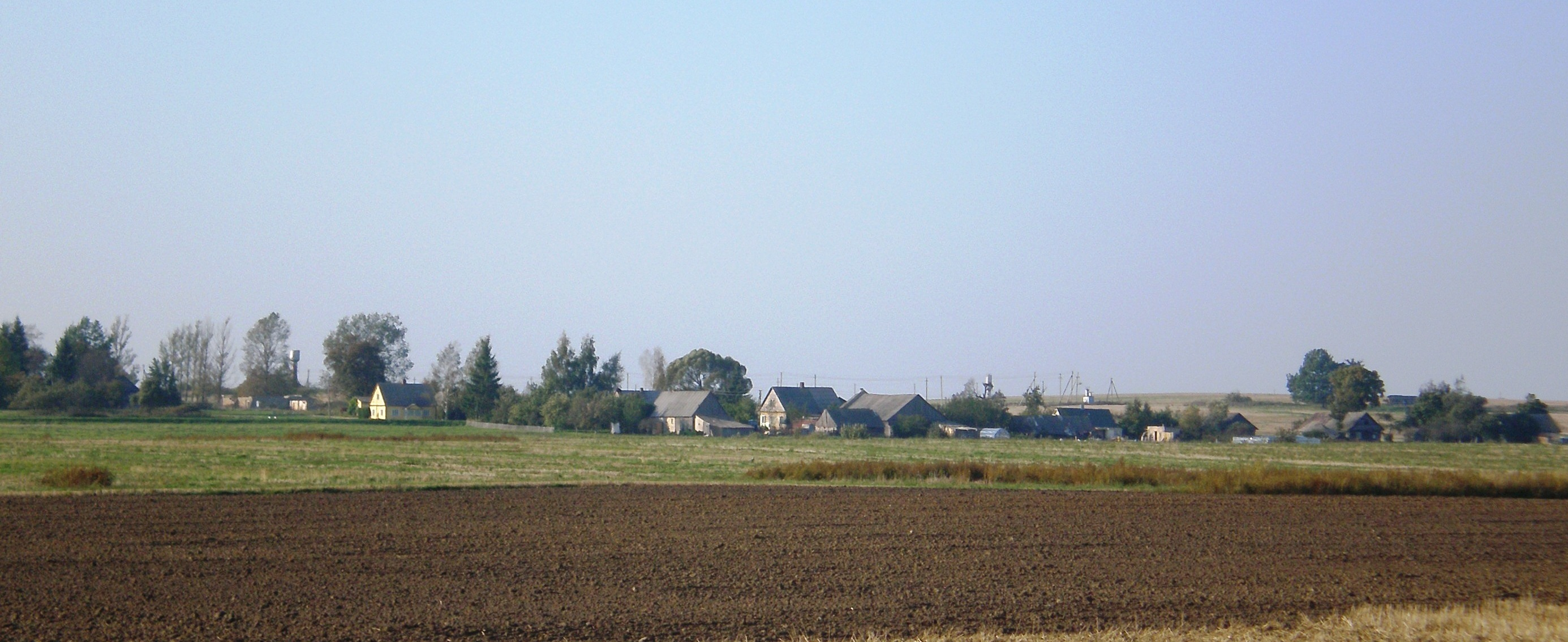

- Location in Lithuania Šmotiškiai (Lithuania)
- Coordinates: 55°19′41″N 23°41′20″E
- Country: Lithuania
- County: Kaunas County
- Municipality: Kėdainiai district municipality
- Eldership: Krakės Eldership

Population (2011)
  - Total: 47
- Time zone: UTC+2 (EET)
  - Summer (DST): UTC+3 (EEST)

Šmotiškiai (formerly Russian: Шматышки) is a village in Kėdainiai district municipality, in Kaunas County, in central Lithuania. According to the 2011 census, the village had a population of 47 people. It is located 9 kilometres (5.6 mi) from Krakės, 2.5 kilometres (1.6 mi) from Pajieslys, on the Krakės-Josvainiai road.

== History ==
The first mention of Šmotiškiai comes from 1593. At that time it had 13 voloks of agriculture land and 15 voloks of forest land. At the 18th century it was a royal village.

== Demography ==
Historical population

Year	Pop.	±% p.a.
1820	54	—
1902	170	+1.41%
1923	81	−3.47%
1959	64	−0.65%
1970	74	+1.33%

Year	Pop.	±% p.a.
1979	59	−2.49%
1987	57	−0.43%
1989	54	−2.67%
2001	56	+0.30%
2011	47	−1.74%

Source: 1902, 1923, 1959 & 1970, 1979, 1989, 2001, 2011

== Images ==
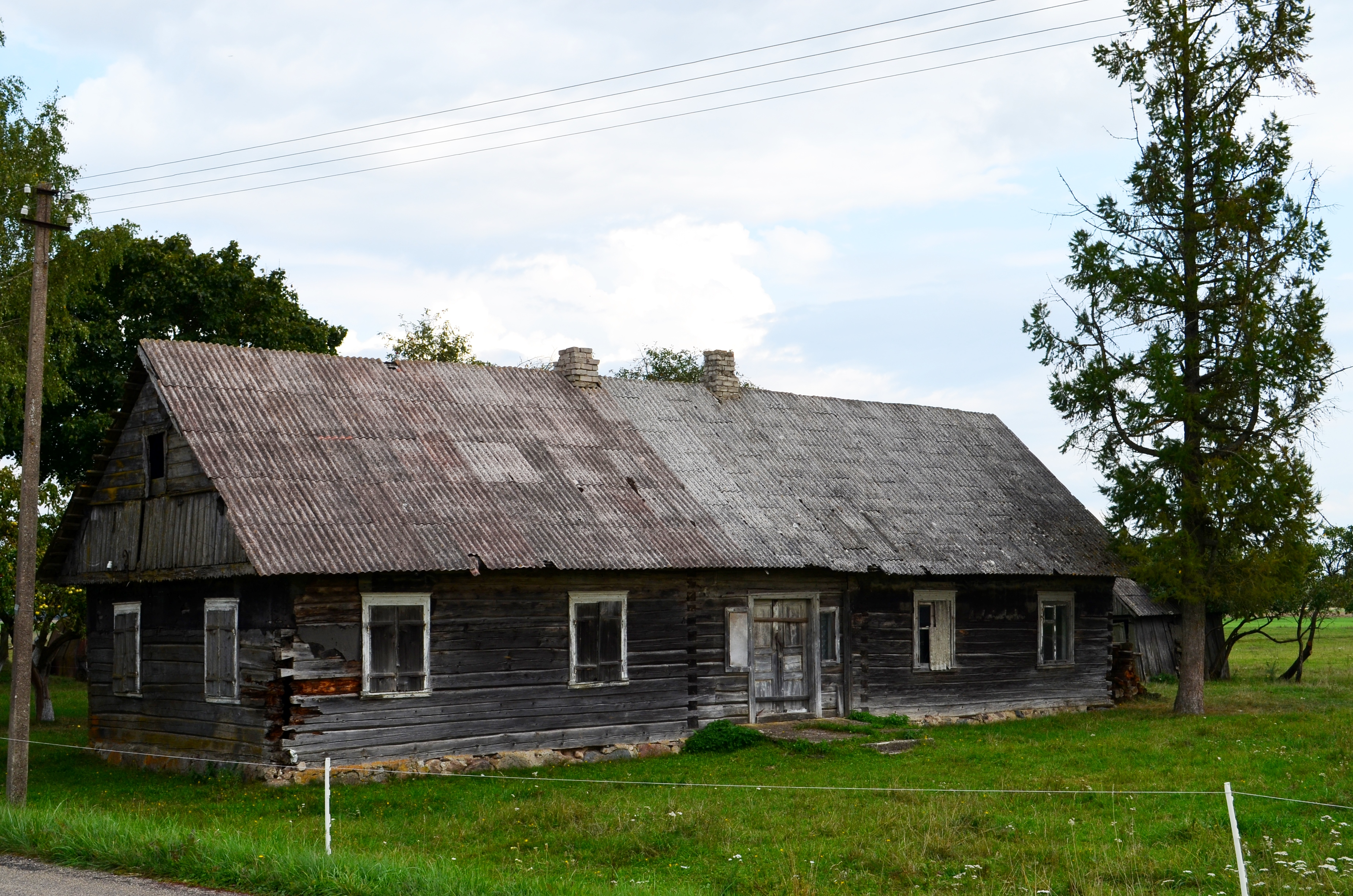
Traditional Aukštaitian house in Šmotiškiai

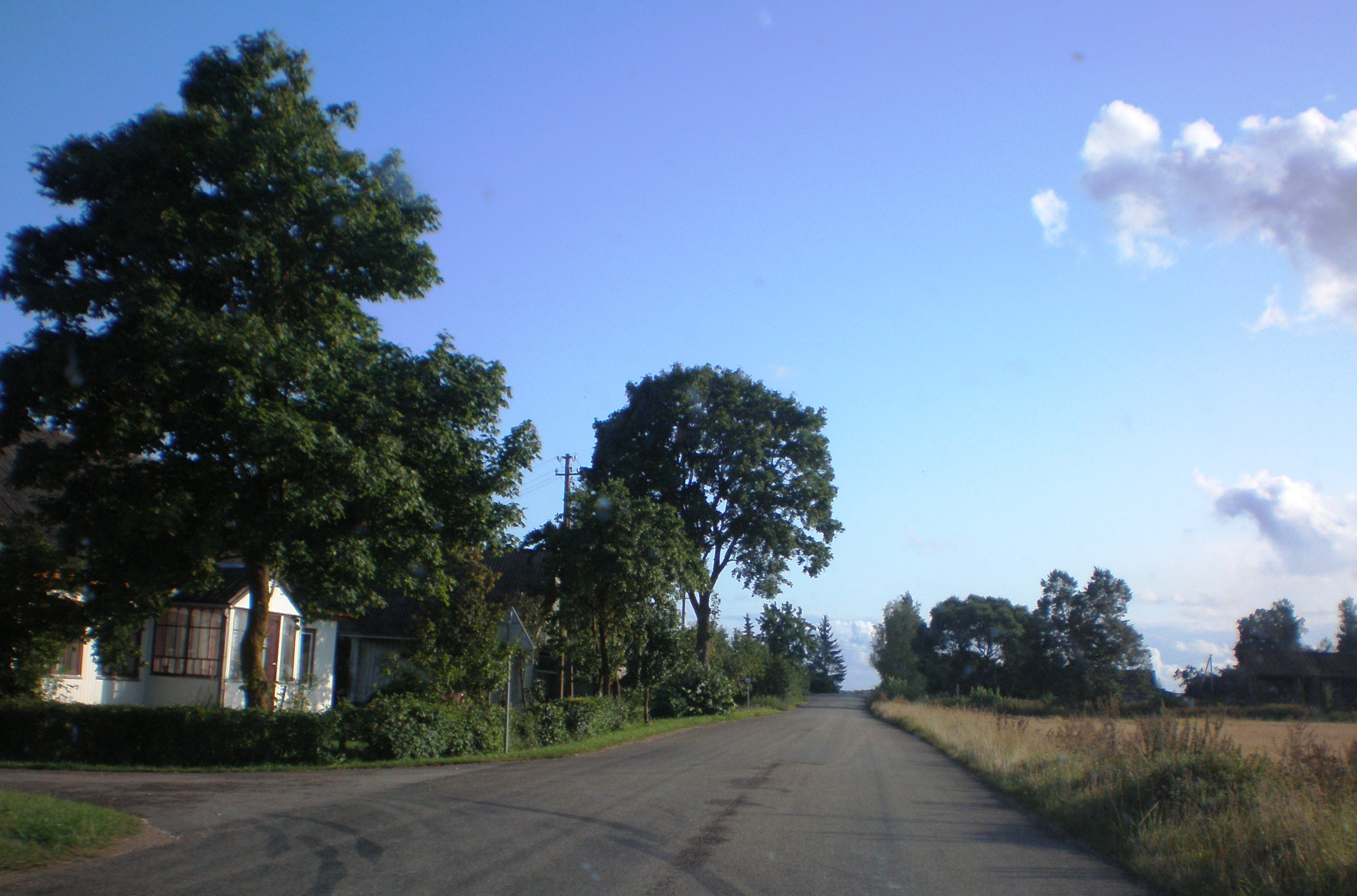
The main street
