= Meironiškiai =

- Village
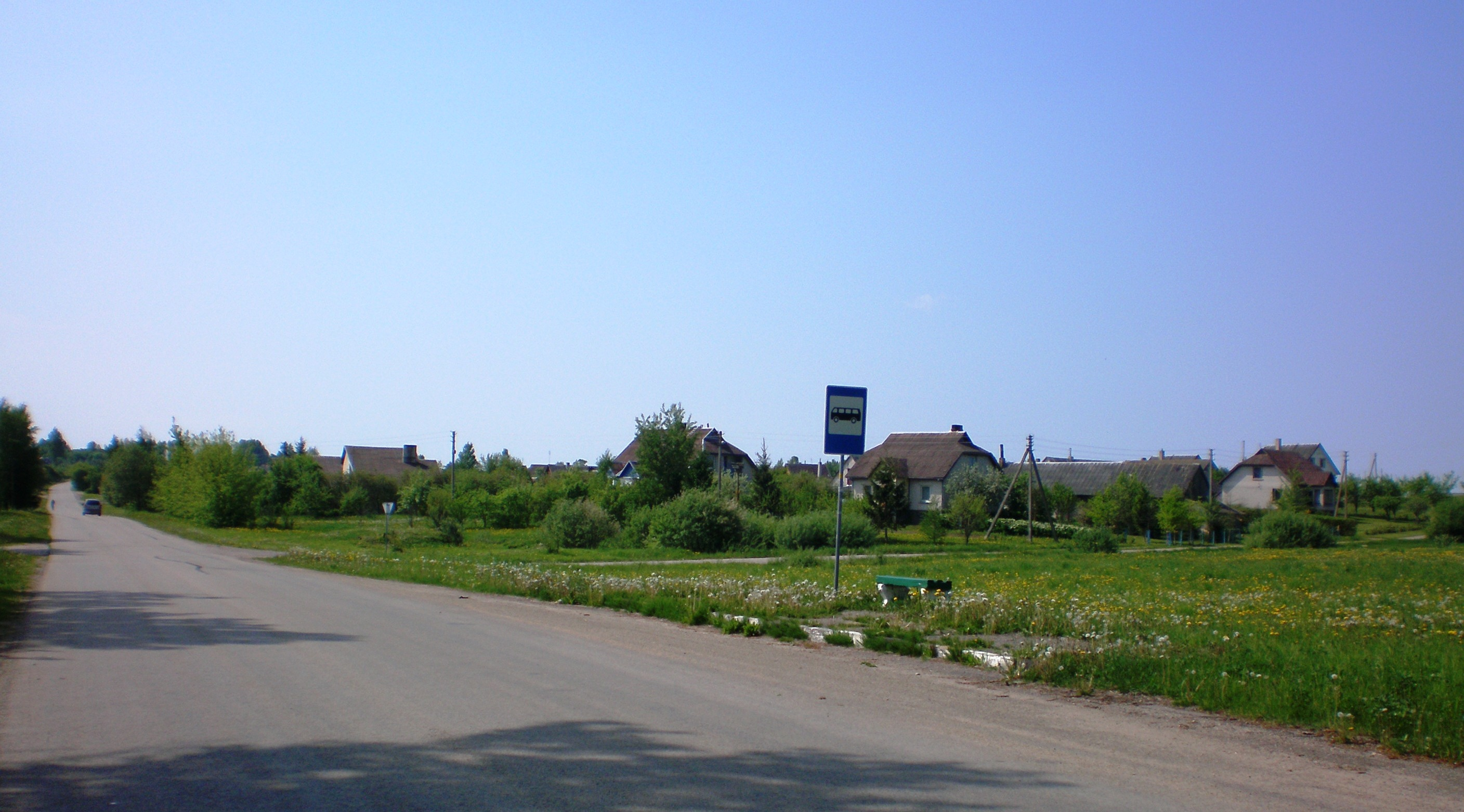

- Location in Lithuania Meironiškiai (Lithuania)
- Coordinates: 55°22′59″N 23°42′50″E
- Country: Lithuania
- County: Kaunas County
- Municipality: Kėdainiai district municipality
- Eldership: Krakės Eldership

Population (2011)
  - Total: 269
- Time zone: UTC+2 (EET)
  - Summer (DST): UTC+3 (EEST)

Meironiškiai (formerly Russian: Мейронишки, Polish: Mejroniszki) is a village in Kėdainiai district municipality, in Kaunas County, in central Lithuania. According to the 2011 census, the village had a population of 269 people. It is located 2.5 kilometres (1.6 mi) from Krakės town, by the Krakės-Josvainiai road, nearby the Smilgaitis and the Dangaučius rivers. There are a shop, a community house, a medicine station, a farm in Meironiškiai. Two big stones standing in the village are declared as a nature heritage object.

== History ==
Meironiškiai developed into a bigger settlement during the Soviet era, as it was a kolkhoz center.

== Demography ==
Historical population

Year	Pop.	±% p.a.
1820	45	—
1902	99	+0.97%
1923	89	−0.51%
1959	85	−0.13%
1970	77	−0.89%

Year	Pop.	±% p.a.
1979	123	+5.34%
1986	165	+4.29%
1989	227	+11.22%
2001	272	+1.52%
2011	269	−0.11%

Source: 1902, 1923, 1959 & 1970, 1979, 1989, 2001, 2011

== Images ==
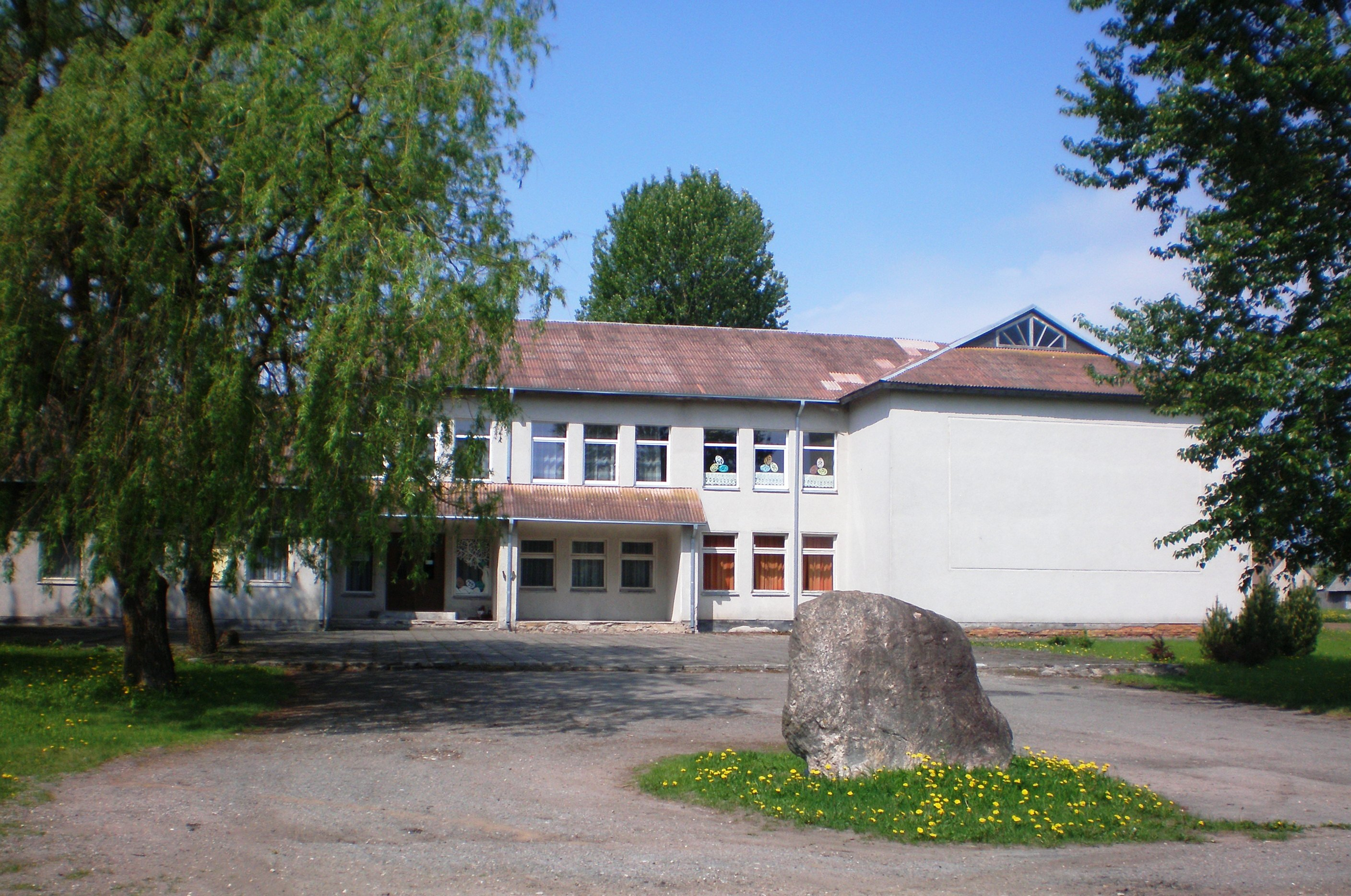
Community house

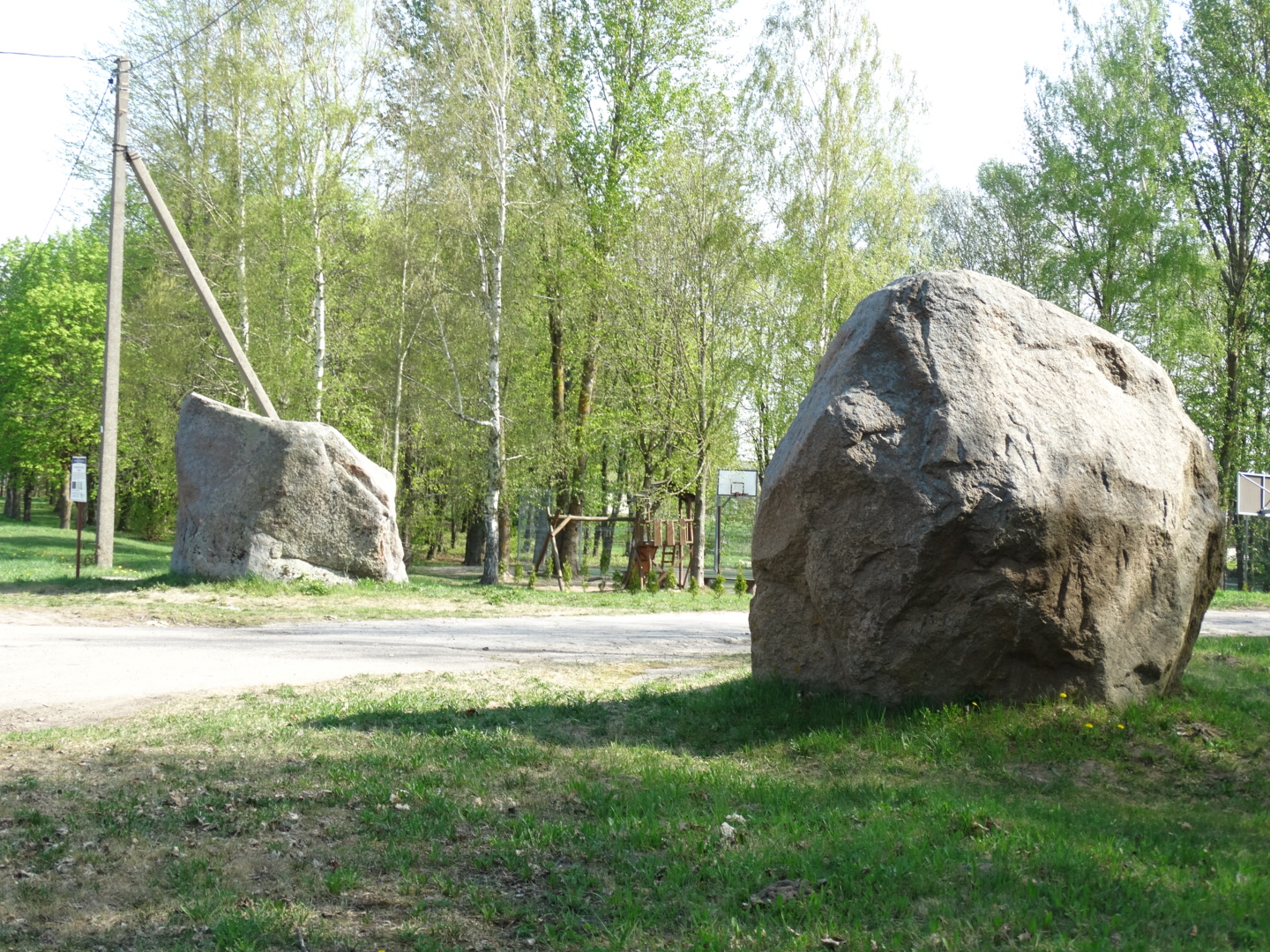
The Meironiškiai Stones
