= Smilgaitis =

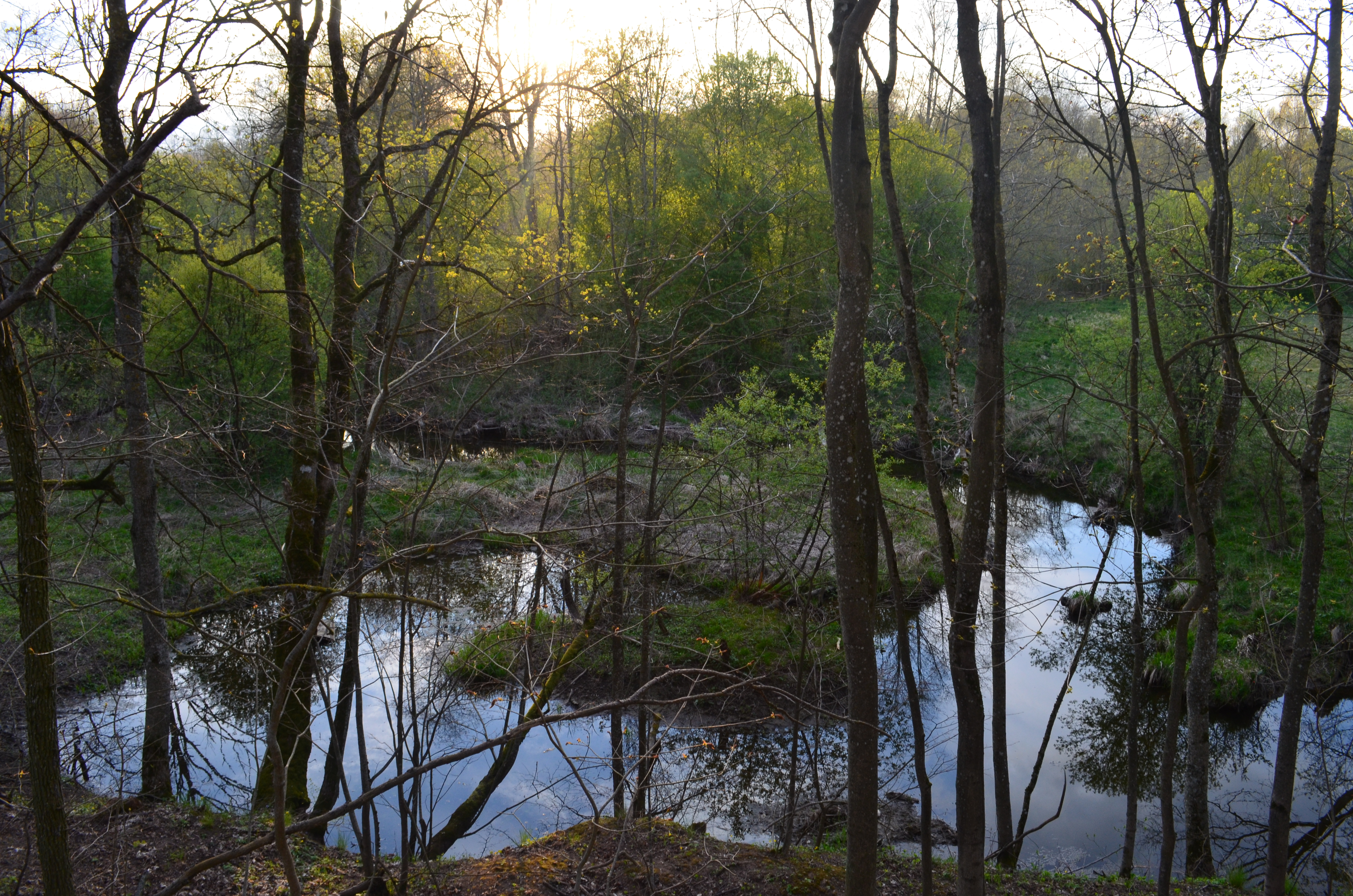
- Smilgaitis near Stasiūnai, Kėdainiai

Location
- Country: Lithuania
- Region: Kėdainiai district municipality, Kaunas County

Physical characteristics
- Source
  - location: Near Krakės
  - coordinates: 55.4155°N 23.6870°E
- Mouth: Smilga
  - coordinates: 55.2920°N 23.8946°E
- Length: 34.2 km (21.3 mi)
- Basin size: 75.6 km^{2} (29.2 sq mi)
- Discharge
  - average: 0.41 m³/s

Basin features
- Progression: Smilga→ Nevėžis→ Neman→ Baltic Sea
- Tributaries
  - right: Dangaučius, Amalis

The Smilgaitis is a river of Kėdainiai district municipality, Kaunas County, central Lithuania. It flows for 34 kilometres (21 mi) and has a basin area of 76 km^{2} (29 sq mi). It is a right tributary of the river Smilga.

Its source is nearby Krakės town. It flows through the Josvainiai forest, Meironiškiai, Ruseiniai villages and meets the Smilga river near Stasiūnai. Keleriškiai pond is dammed on the Smilgaitis river.

The name Smilgaitis comes from the Lithuanian word smilga ('bentgrass').
