= Krakės =

- Town
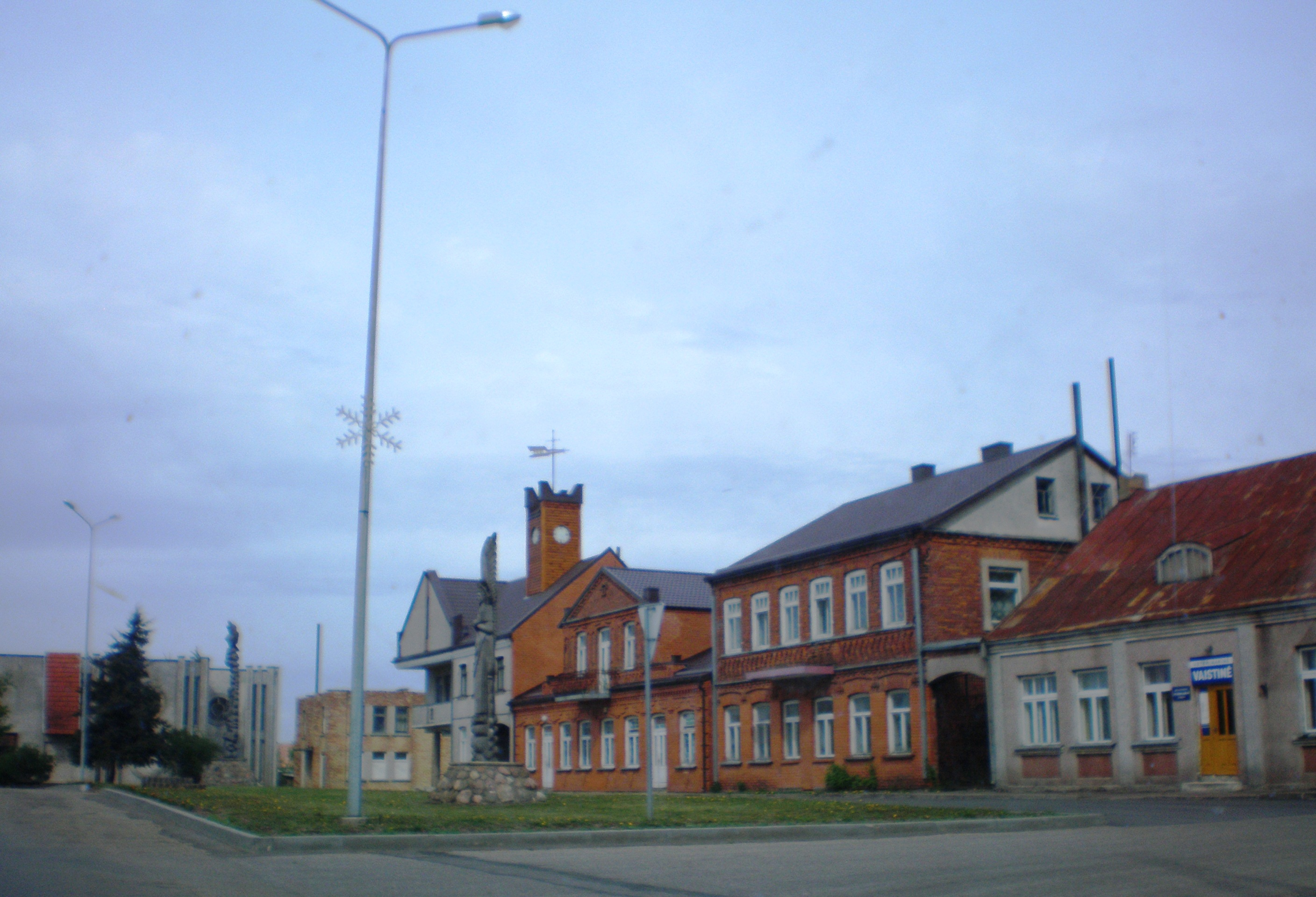
- Center of the town

- Coat of arms

- Location of Krakės Krakės (Lithuania)
- Coordinates: 55°24′30″N 23°43′30″E
- Country: Lithuania
- Ethnographic region: Aukštaitija
- County: Kaunas County
- Municipality: Kėdainiai district municipality
- Eldership: Krakės Eldership
- Capital of: Krakės Eldership
- First mentioned: 14th century

Population (2011)
  - Total: 841
- Time zone: UTC+2 (EET)
  - Summer (DST): UTC+3 (EEST)

Krakės (formerly Krakiai) is a small town in Kėdainiai district, central Lithuania. It is located on the Smilgaitis River. In the town, there are the Catholic church of St. Matthew the Evangelist (built in 1907), Mikalojus Katkus gymnasium, library, medicine station, St. Catherine women convent, Krakės Agriculture Cooperative with former culture center, swimming pool and shop (built in 1983, architect K. Žalnierius). There is the Vytautas Ulevičius museum of wooden sculptures.

Krakės is on the eastern boundary of the Nevėžis Plain, on the Krakės Ridge (altitude 95–100 meters). Roads go to Betygala, Grinkiškis, Kėdainiai, Bokštai, Gudžiūnai and Josvainiai. The Krakės-Dotnuva Forest is 2–3 km away from the town.

== Etymology ==
The name of the town derives from the personal name Krãkė (whose meaning is believed to be either "black woodpecker, red-headed woodpecker" or "Crucian carp" in the local dialect). During the interwar period of the 20th century, the town was known as Krakiai, and the local Jewish population referred to it in Yiddish as קרוקי.

== History ==
The first mention of Krakės is from the 14th century. The Krakės Manor was a property of Samogitian bishops between 1421 and 1842. The first church of Krakės was built in the 15th century. Krakės is mentioned as a town in 1579. A women's monastery of St. Catherine Order was established in Krakės in 1615 and ran till 1945 (the wooden monastery burnt at that time), then reestablished in 1997. A market privilege was granted to Krakės in 1790. During 1863, Krakės was an important centre of the January uprising, on 28 April there was a battle against the Russian imperial army. In 1863 and 1914 Krakės was devastated by fires.

On 2 September 1941, 1,125 Jews from Krakės, Baisogala, Dotnuva, Grinkiškis, Gudžiūnai and Surviliškis were murdered at Peštinukai village, about 1.5 kilometers from Krakės. The spot for the massacre was chosen by local police chief Teodoras Kerza upon receiving orders from the 13th Lithuanian TDA Battalion. The members of the Einsatzgruppen who committed this crime were Germans from Rollkommando Hamann and Lithuanians collaborators.

During the Soviet era Krakės was a center of kolkhoz and selsovet. Krakės kolkhoz was one of the leading ones in all Lithuanian SSR.

== Demography ==
Historical population

Year	Pop.	±% p.a.
1841	594	—
1865	871	+1.61%
1897	1,846	+2.38%
1906	1,000	−6.58%
1923	1,386	+1.94%

Year	Pop.	±% p.a.
1959	1,047	−0.78%
1970	901	−1.36%
1978	904	+0.04%
1979	1,028	+13.72%
1985	925	−1.74%

Year	Pop.	±% p.a.
1989	954	+0.77%
2001	991	+0.32%
2011	841	−1.63%

Source: 1902, 1923, 1959 & 1970, 1979, 1989, 2001, 2011

== Images ==
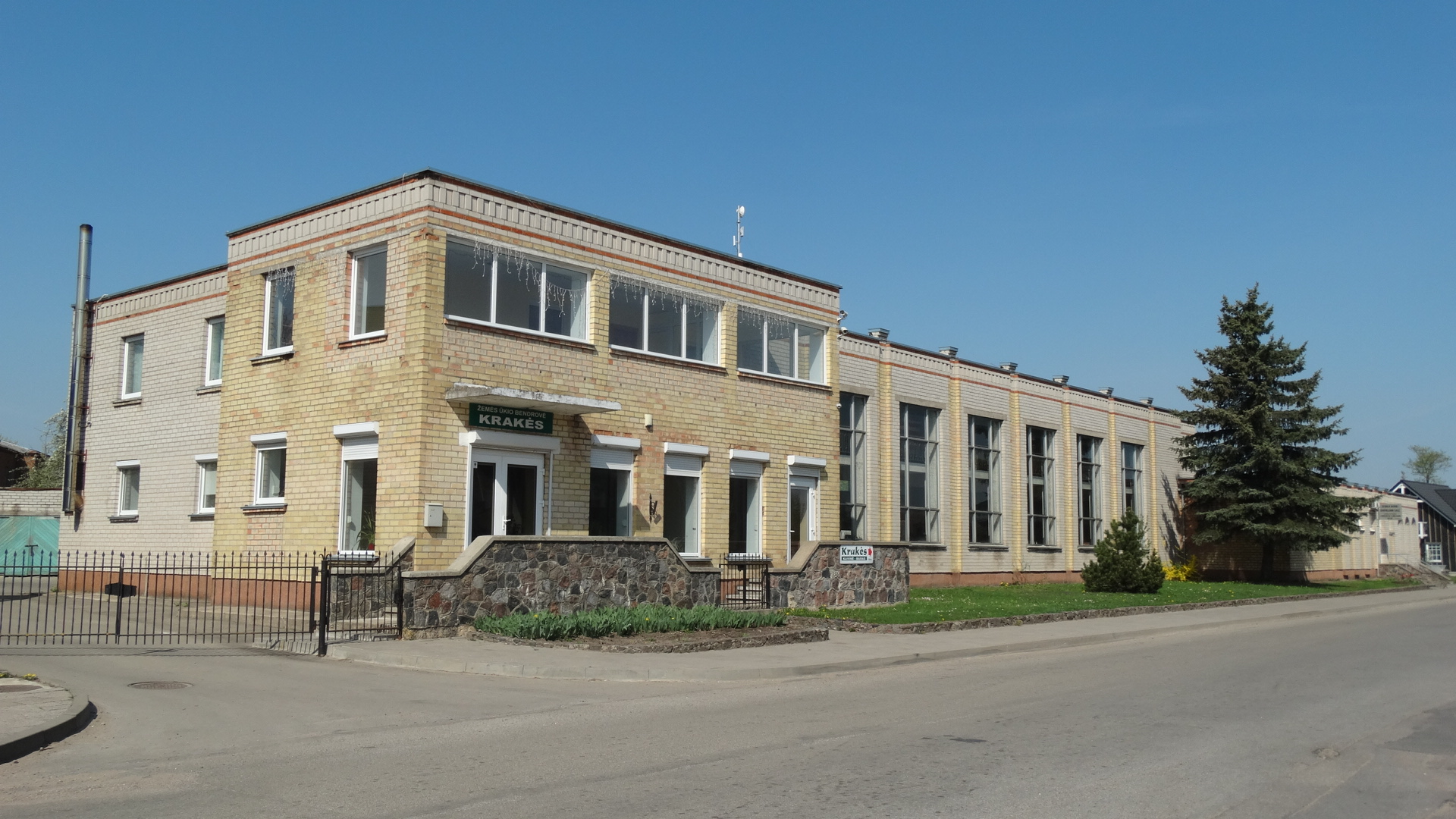
Former kolkhoz swimming pool

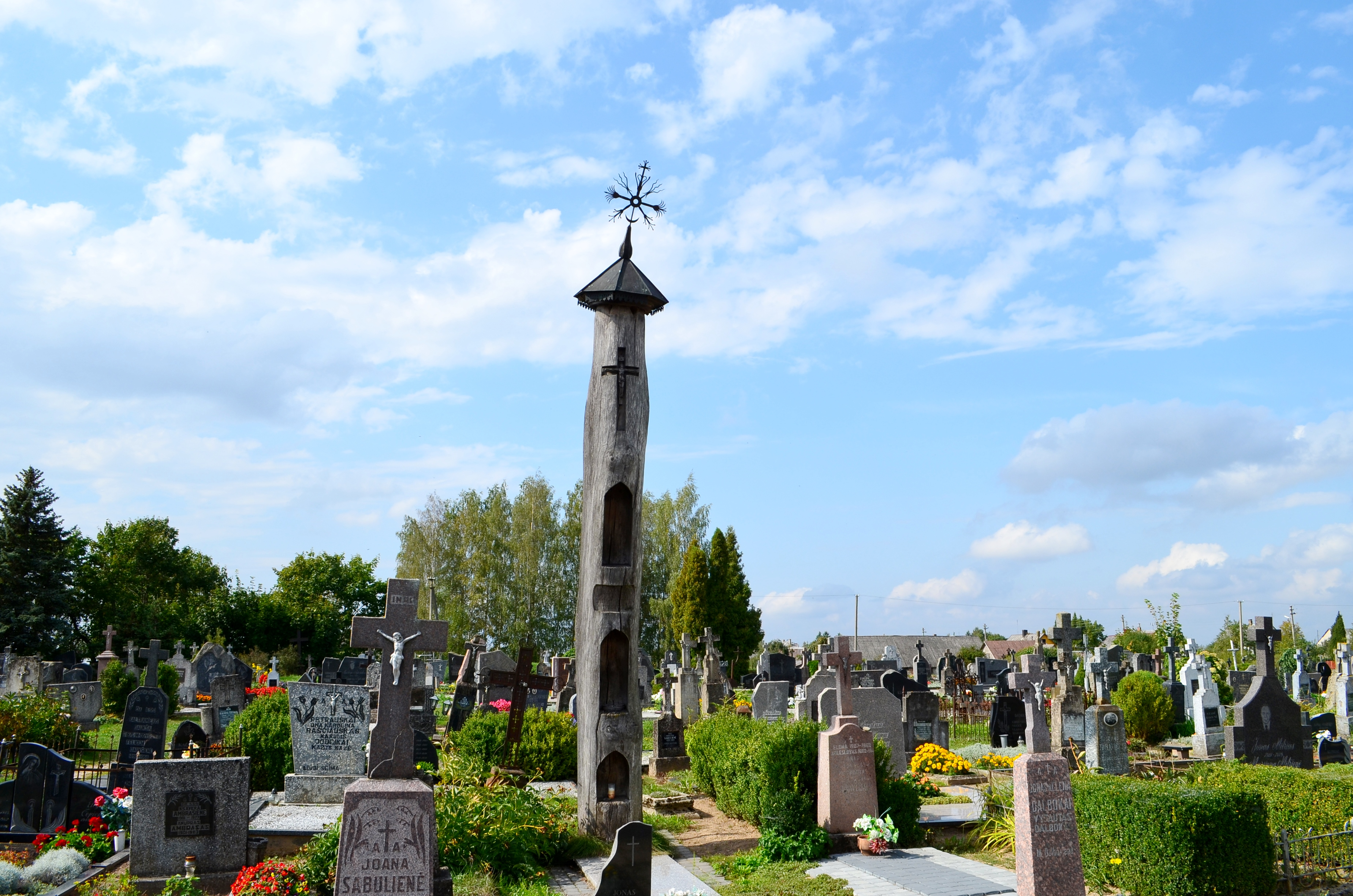
Krakės cemetery

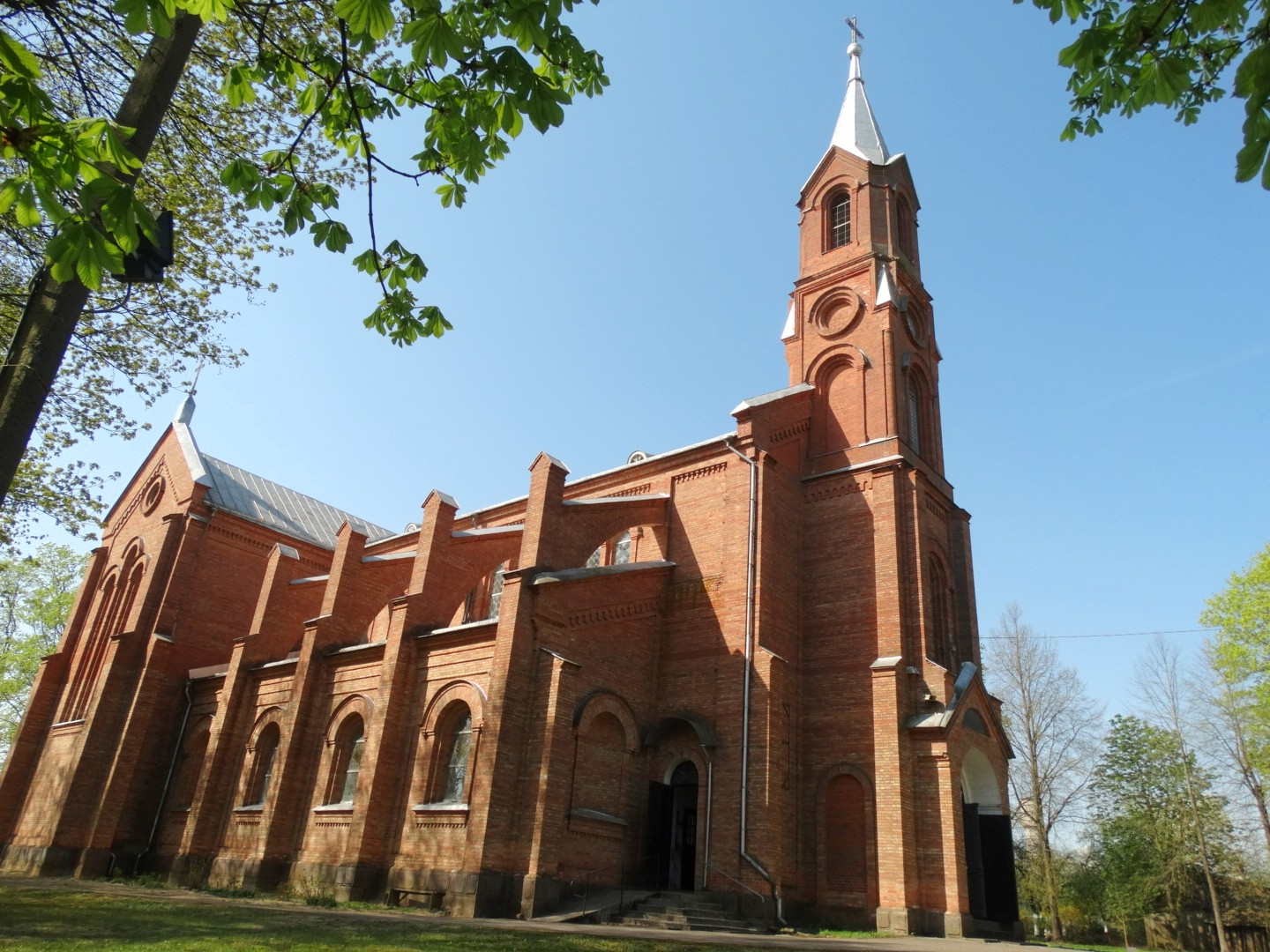
Krakės church

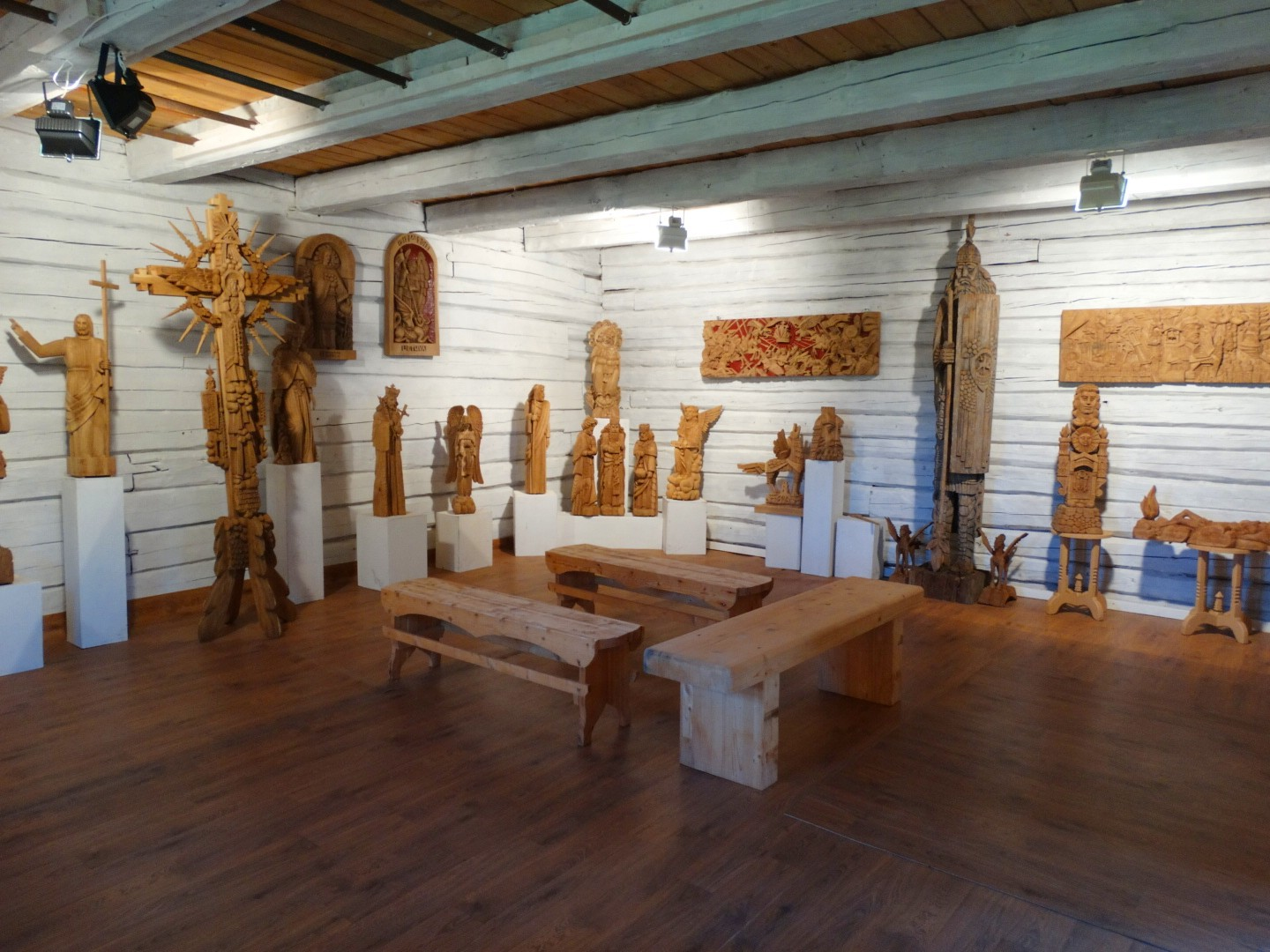
V. Ulevičius museum
