= Tranys =

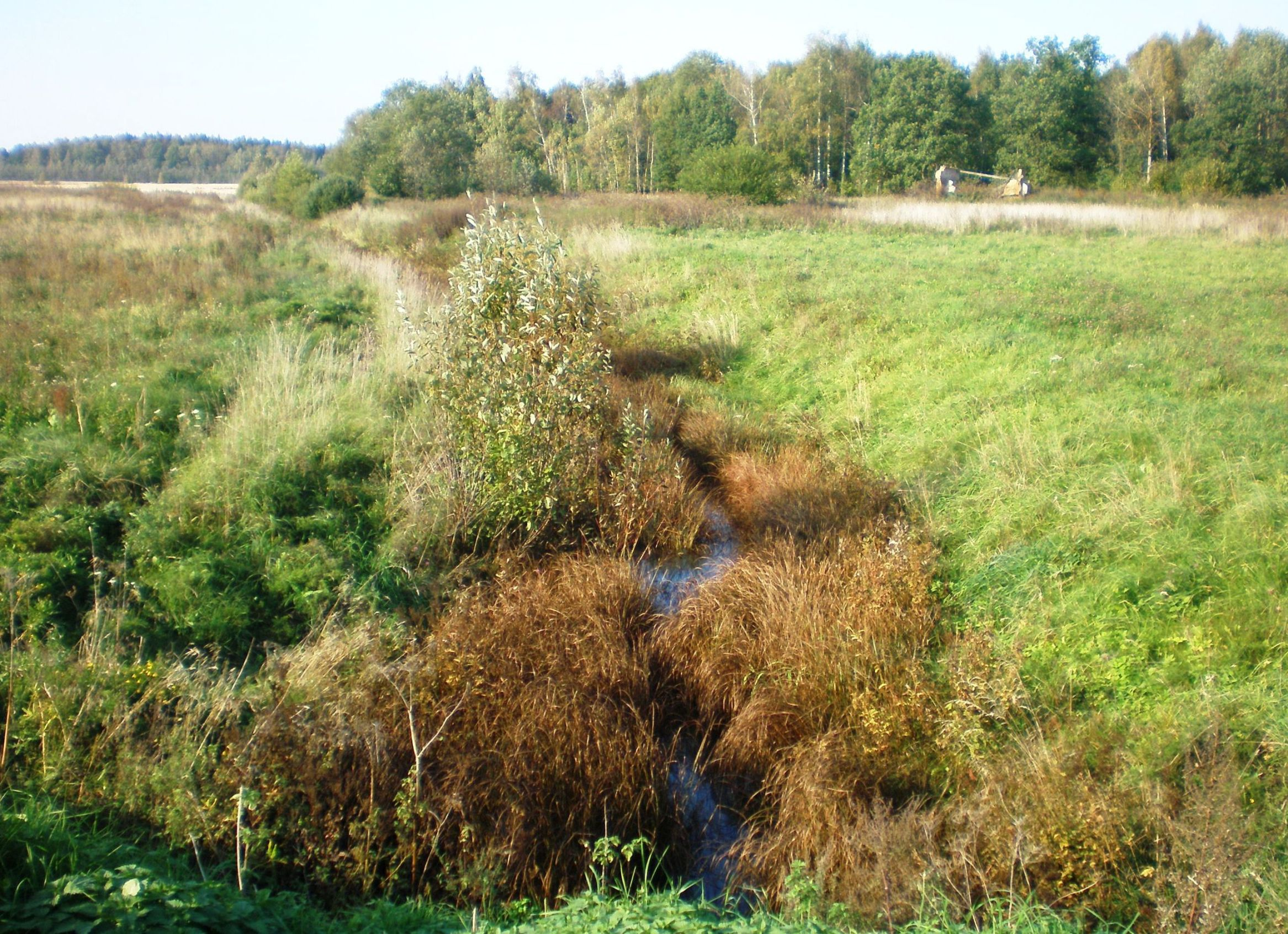
- Tranys at Patranys

Location
- Country: Lithuania
- Region: Kėdainiai district municipality, Kaunas County

Physical characteristics
- Source
  - location: Krakės-Dotnuva forest next to Apušrotas
- Mouth: Smilga nearby Medininkai
  - coordinates: 55°20′24″N 23°45′58″E
- Length: 7.6 km (4.7 mi)
- Basin size: 8.2 km^{2} (3.2 sq mi)

Basin features
- Progression: Smilga→ Nevėžis→ Neman→ Baltic Sea

The Tranys is a river of Kėdainiai district municipality, Kaunas County, central Lithuania. It flows for 7.6 kilometres (4.7 mi).

The river is a left tributary of the Smilga, which flows into the Neman via the Nevėžis. Its basin is mostly covered by forests, including the Krakės-Dotnuva forest and Josvainiai forest.

The Tranys passes through Špitolpievis and Patranys villages.

The name Tranys possibly comes from Lithuanian verbs tranėti, trenėti, trūnyti ('to rot, to putrefy, to decay').
