= Medininkai (disambiguation) =

Medininkai is a village in Lithuania.

Medininkai can also refer to:

- Medininkai Castle, a castle in the village
- Medininkai Eldership, Lithuania
- Medininkai incident, the mostb serious of multiple Soviet OMON assaults on Lithuanian border posts in 1991
- Medininkai Gate, an alternative name for Gate of Dawn in Vilnius
- Medininkai, Kėdainiai, village in Lithuania
- Varniai, city in Lithuania, was previously referred to as Medininkai

== See also ==
- Battle of Medininkai, a battle in 1320 between the Teutonic Knights and Samogitians
