= Špitolpievis =

- Village
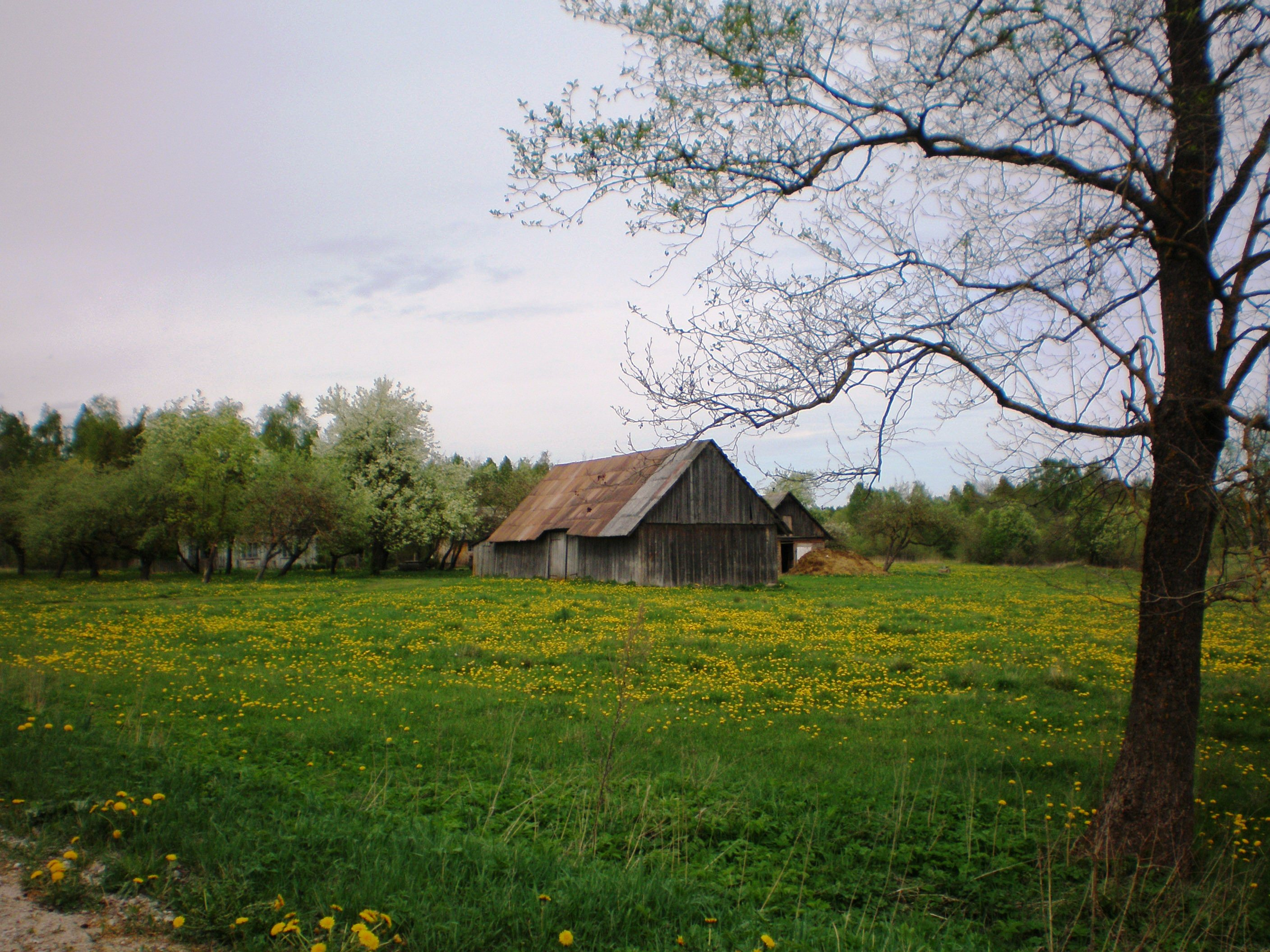

- Location in Lithuania Špitolpievis (Lithuania)
- Coordinates: 55°22′52″N 23°45′22″E
- Country: Lithuania
- County: Kaunas County
- Municipality: Kėdainiai district municipality
- Eldership: Krakės Eldership

Population (2011)
  - Total: 10
- Time zone: UTC+2 (EET)
  - Summer (DST): UTC+3 (EEST)

Špitolpievis ('meadow of szpital', formerly Russian: Шпитольпевисъ, Polish: Szpitolpewis) is a village in Kėdainiai district municipality, in Kaunas County, in central Lithuania. According to the 2011 census, the village had a population of 10 people. It is located 3 kilometres (1.9 mi) from Meironiškiai, by the Tranys river, inside the Krakės-Dotnuva Forest, alongside the Kėdainiai-Krakės road.

== Demography ==
Historical population

Year	Pop.	±% p.a.
1902	18	—
1923	76	+7.10%
1959	61	−0.61%
1970	41	−3.55%

Year	Pop.	±% p.a.
1979	20	−7.67%
1989	13	−4.22%
2001	7	−5.03%
2011	10	+3.63%

Source: 1902, 1923, 1959 & 1970, 1979, 1989, 2001, 2011
