= Kačupys =

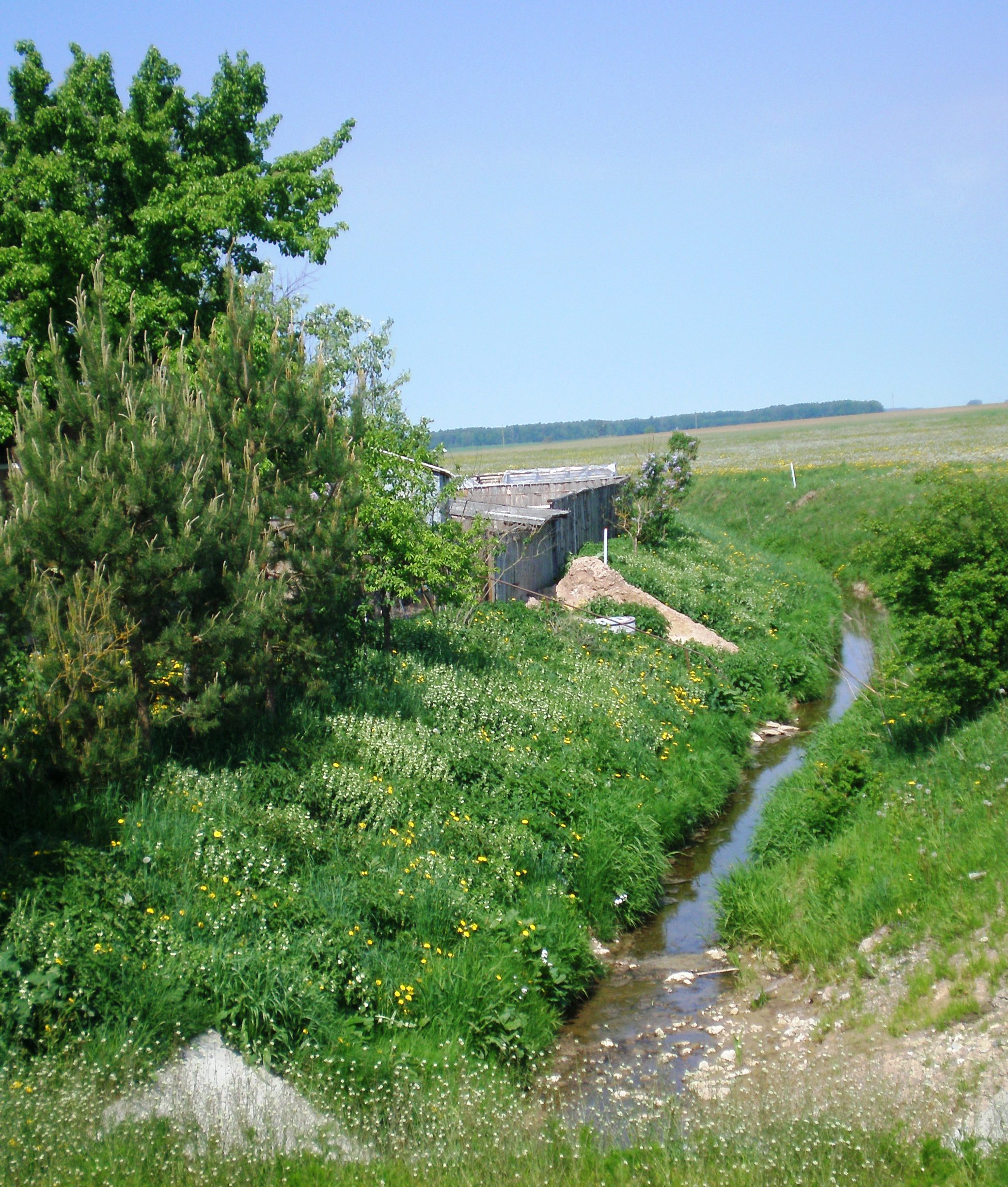

- Location within Lithuania

Location
- Country: Lithuania
- Region: Kėdainiai district municipality, Kaunas County

Physical characteristics
- Source
  - location: Krakės-Dotnuva forest
  - coordinates: 55.4230°N 23.7926°E
- Mouth: Dotnuvėlė
  - coordinates: 55.3945°N 23.8511°E
- Length: 9.0 kilometres (5.6 mi)
- Basin size: 10.2 km^{2} (3.9 sq mi)

Basin features
- Progression: Dotnuvėlė→ Nevėžis→ Neman→ Baltic Sea

The Kačupys is a river of Kėdainiai district municipality, Kaunas County, central Lithuania. It is the right tributary of the Dotnuvėlė river. It starts from the Krakės-Dotnuva forest, then goes through Siponiai and meets the Dotnuvėlė nearby Vainotiškiai village.

The name Kačupys means 'Cat River' (i. e. is could mean 'petty, inferior river').
