= Apušrotas, Kėdainiai =

Apušrotas
- Village
- Location in Lithuania Apušrotas (Lithuania)
- Coordinates: 55°23′38″N 23°47′31″E
- Country: Lithuania
- County: Kaunas County
- Municipality: Kėdainiai district municipality
- Eldership: Krakės Eldership

Population (2011)
  - Total: 0
- Time zone: UTC+2 (EET)
  - Summer (DST): UTC+3 (EEST)

Apušrotas ('an aspen forest', formerly Polish: Apuszrotas, Russian: Апушротасъ) is a village in Kėdainiai district municipality, in Kaunas County, in central Lithuania. According to the 2011 census, the village was uninhabited. It is located 3 kilometres (1.9 mi) from Krakės, inside the Krakės-Dotnuva Forest, by the Jaugila river.

At the beginning of the 20th century, there was Apušrotas estate. Later there were two hamlets.

== Demography ==
Historical population

Year	Pop.	±% p.a.
1902	19	—
1923	25	+1.32%
1959	17	−1.07%
1970	7	−7.75%

Year	Pop.	±% p.a.
1979	8	+1.49%
1989	2	−12.94%
2001	0	−100.00%
2011	0	0.00%

Source: 1902, 1923, 1959 & 1970, 1979, 1989, 2001, 2011
