= Barsukynė, Kėdainiai =

Barsukynė
- Village
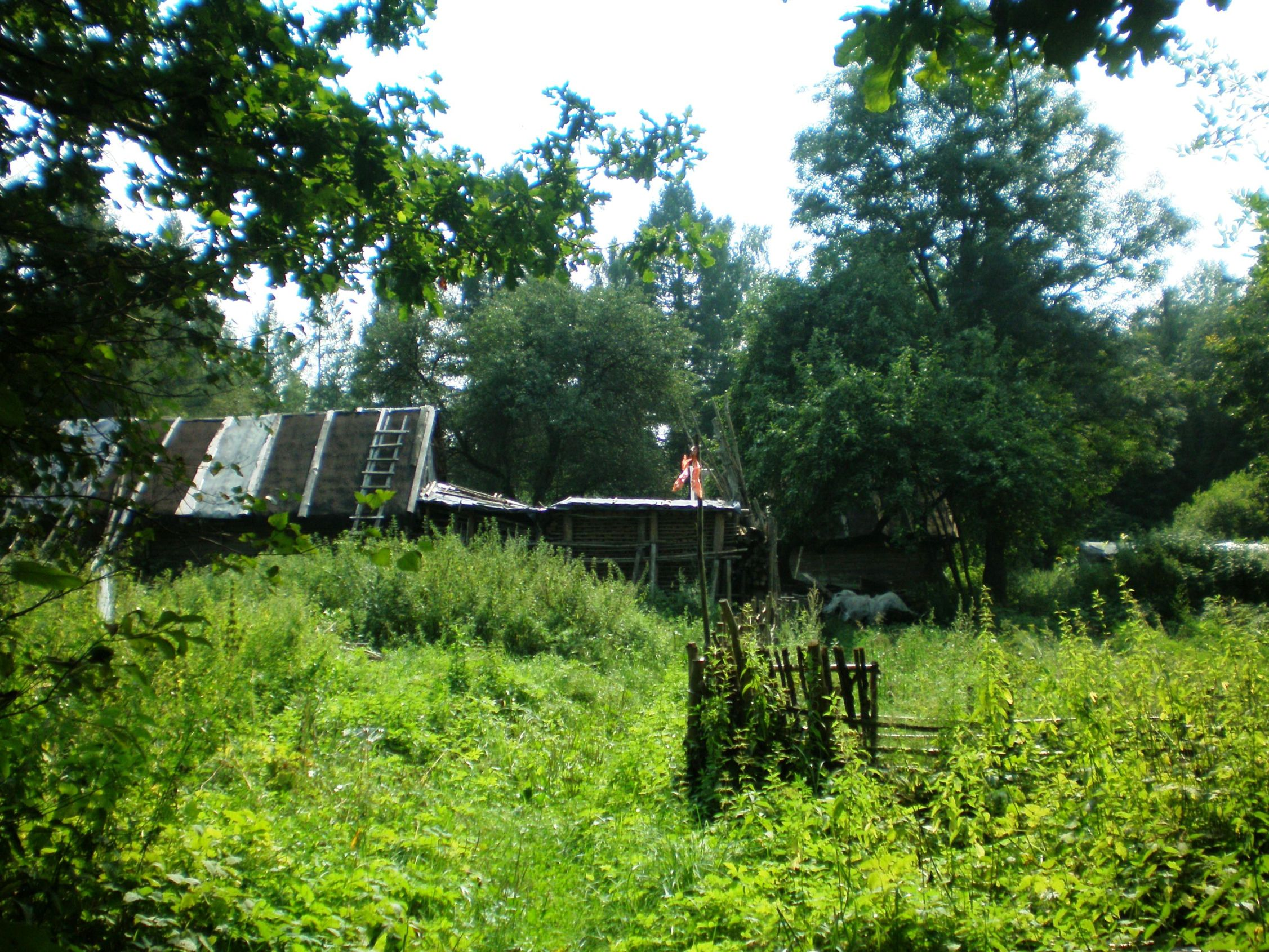

- Location in Lithuania Barsukynė (Lithuania)
- Coordinates: 55°18′22″N 23°48′40″E
- Country: Lithuania
- County: Kaunas County
- Municipality: Kėdainiai district municipality
- Eldership: Josvainiai Eldership

Population (2011)
  - Total: 0
- Time zone: UTC+2 (EET)
  - Summer (DST): UTC+3 (EEST)

Barsukynė ('badger place', formerly Russian: Барсукини, Polish: Barsukinia) is a village in Kėdainiai district municipality, in Kaunas County, in central Lithuania. According to the 2011 census, the village was uninhabited. It is located 2.5 kilometres (1.6 mi) from Lipliūnai, in the midst of the Josvainiai Forest, nearby the Smilga river. There is no road or electricity in the village. A game butchery is next to the village.

== Demography ==
Historical population

Year	Pop.	±% p.a.
1902	41	—
1923	15	−4.68%
1959	18	+0.51%
1970	14	−2.26%

Year	Pop.	±% p.a.
1979	4	−12.99%
1989	2	−6.70%
2001	2	+0.00%
2011	0	−100.00%

Source: 1902, 1923, 1959 & 1970, 1979, 1989, 2001, 2011
