= Siponiai =

- Village
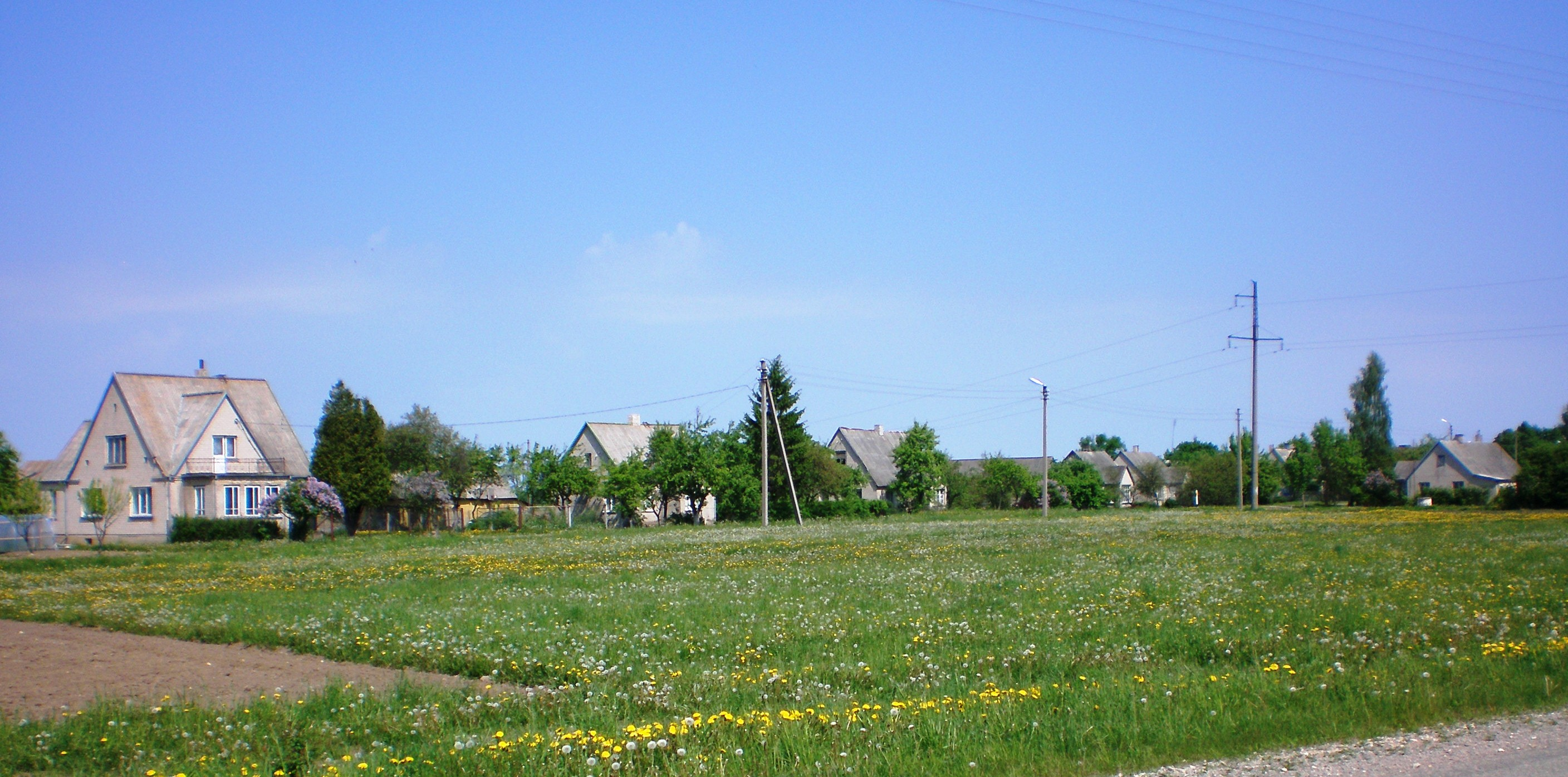

- Location in Lithuania Siponiai (Lithuania)
- Coordinates: 55°25′0″N 23°49′0″E
- Country: Lithuania
- County: Kaunas County
- Municipality: Kėdainiai district municipality
- Eldership: Dotnuva Eldership

Population (2011)
  - Total: 96
- Time zone: UTC+2 (EET)
  - Summer (DST): UTC+3 (EEST)

Siponiai is a village in Kėdainiai district municipality, in Kaunas County, in central Lithuania. It is located by the Dotnuvėlė and Kačupys rivers. According to the 2011 census, the village has a population of 96 people. There is mythological stone "Ožakmenis" ("The Goat Stone") in the Siponiai village.

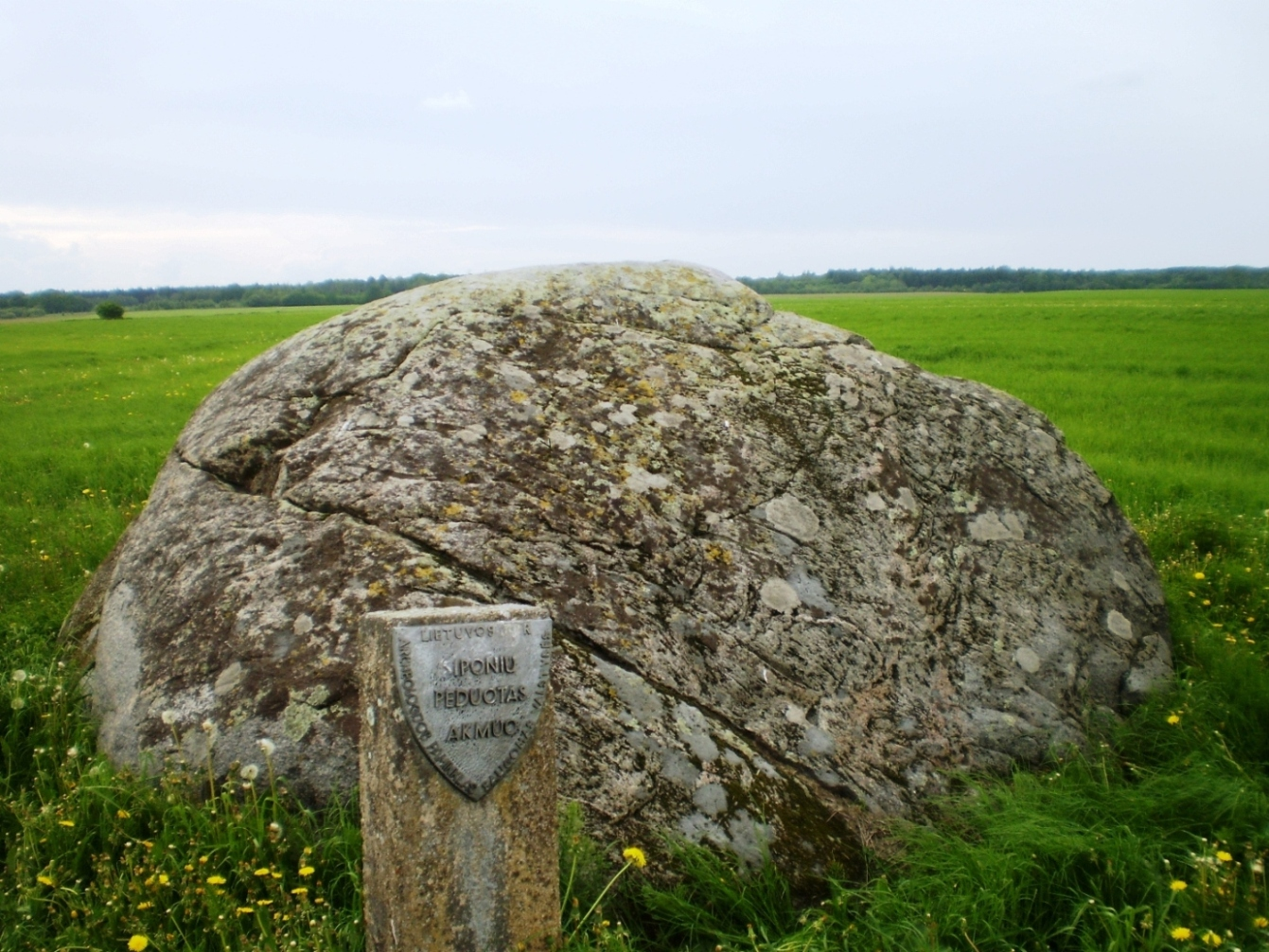
Siponiai sacred stone "Ožakmenis"

== Demography ==
Historical population

| Year | Pop. | ±% p.a. |
|---|---|---|
| 1902 | 189 | — |
| 1923 | 199 | +0.25% |
| 1959 | 181 | −0.26% |
| 1970 | 156 | −1.34% |

| Year | Pop. | ±% p.a. |
|---|---|---|
| 1979 | 148 | −0.58% |
| 1989 | 133 | −1.06% |
| 2001 | 93 | −2.94% |
| 2011 | 96 | +0.32% |

Source: 1902, 1923, 1959 & 1970, 1979, 1989, 2001, 2011
