= Medininkai, Kėdainiai =

Medininkai
- Village
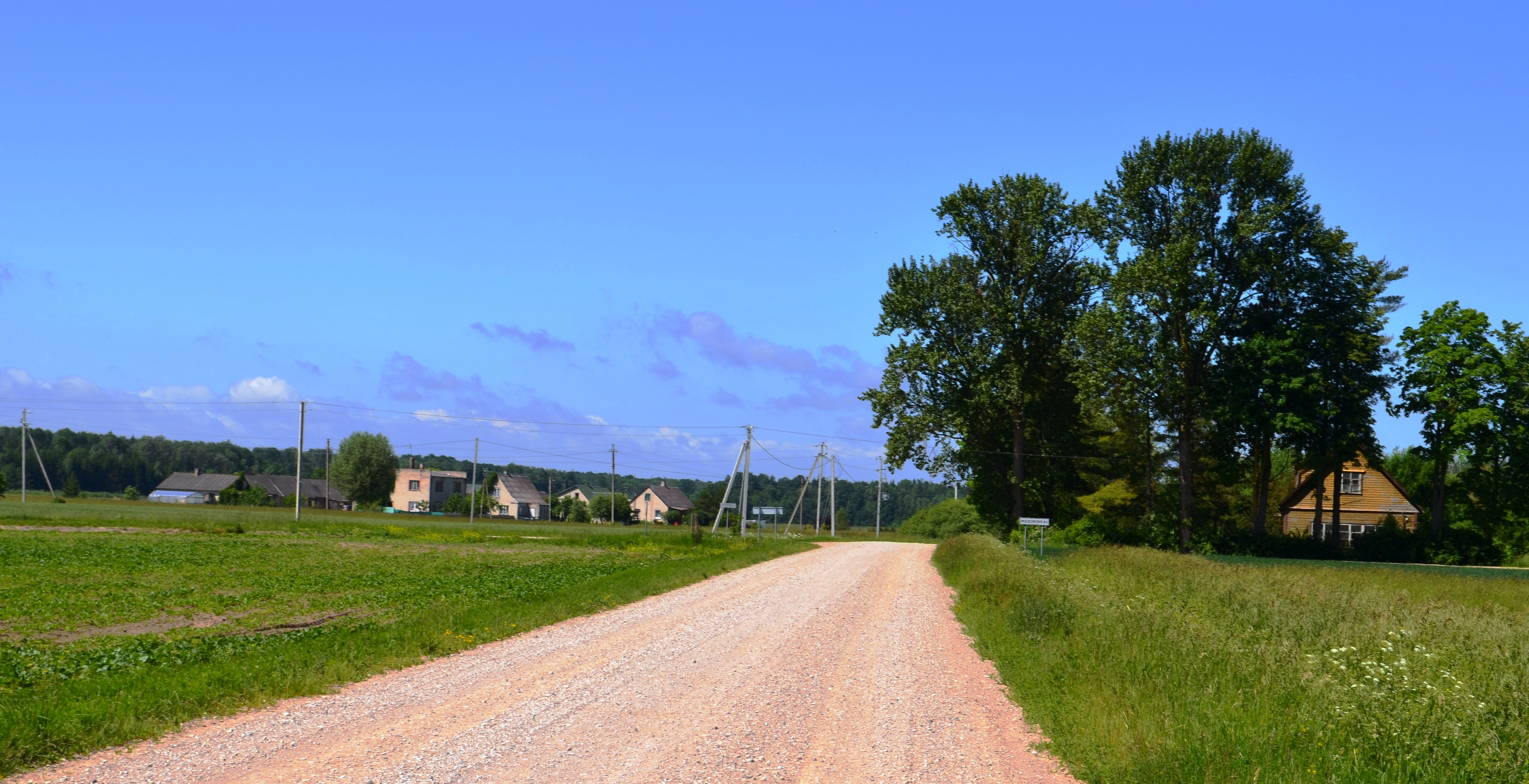

- Location in Lithuania Medininkai (Lithuania)
- Coordinates: 55°21′11″N 23°46′30″E
- Country: Lithuania
- County: Kaunas County
- Municipality: Kėdainiai district municipality
- Eldership: Krakės Eldership

Population (2011)
  - Total: 62
- Time zone: UTC+2 (EET)
  - Summer (DST): UTC+3 (EEST)

Medininkai ('foresters, woodsmen', formerly Russian: Мѣдники, Polish: Miedniki) is a village in Kėdainiai district municipality, in Kaunas County, in central Lithuania. According to the 2011 census, the village had a population of 62 people. It is located 7 kilometres (4.3 mi) from Dotnuva town, 5 kilometres (3.1 mi) from Meironiškiai, nearby the Smilga river, surrounded by the Josvainiai Forest and the Krakės-Dotnuva Forest. There is a former school.

== History ==
At the beginning of the 20th century there were Medininkai village and estate.

== Demography ==
Historical population

Year	Pop.	±% p.a.
1902	174	—
1923	143	−0.93%
1959	131	−0.24%
1970	136	+0.34%

Year	Pop.	±% p.a.
1979	149	+1.02%
1989	102	−3.72%
2001	88	−1.22%
2011	62	−3.44%

Source: 1902, 1923, 1959 & 1970, 1979, 1989, 2001, 2011

== Images ==
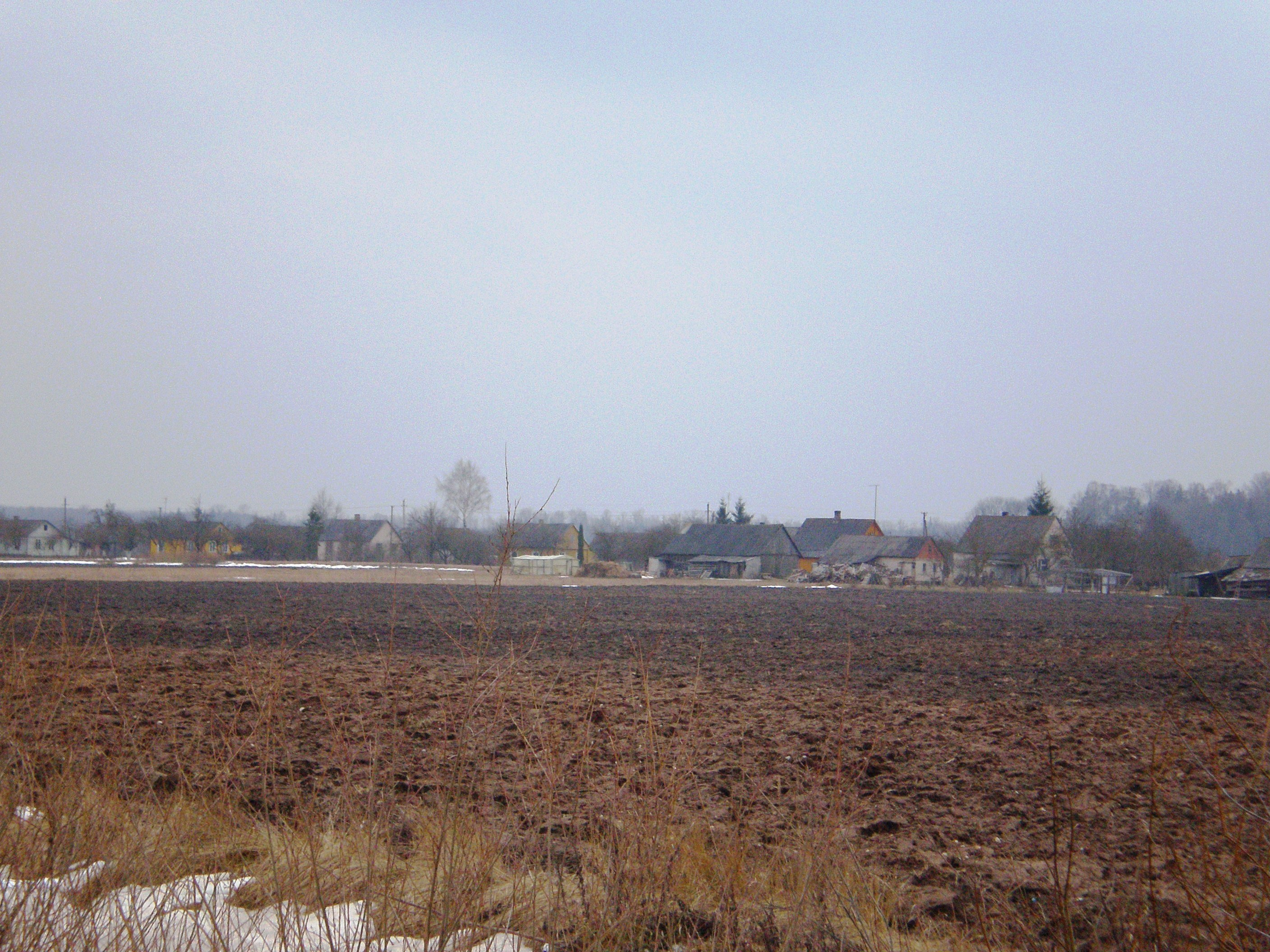
Medininkai village from the Kėdainiai-Krakės road

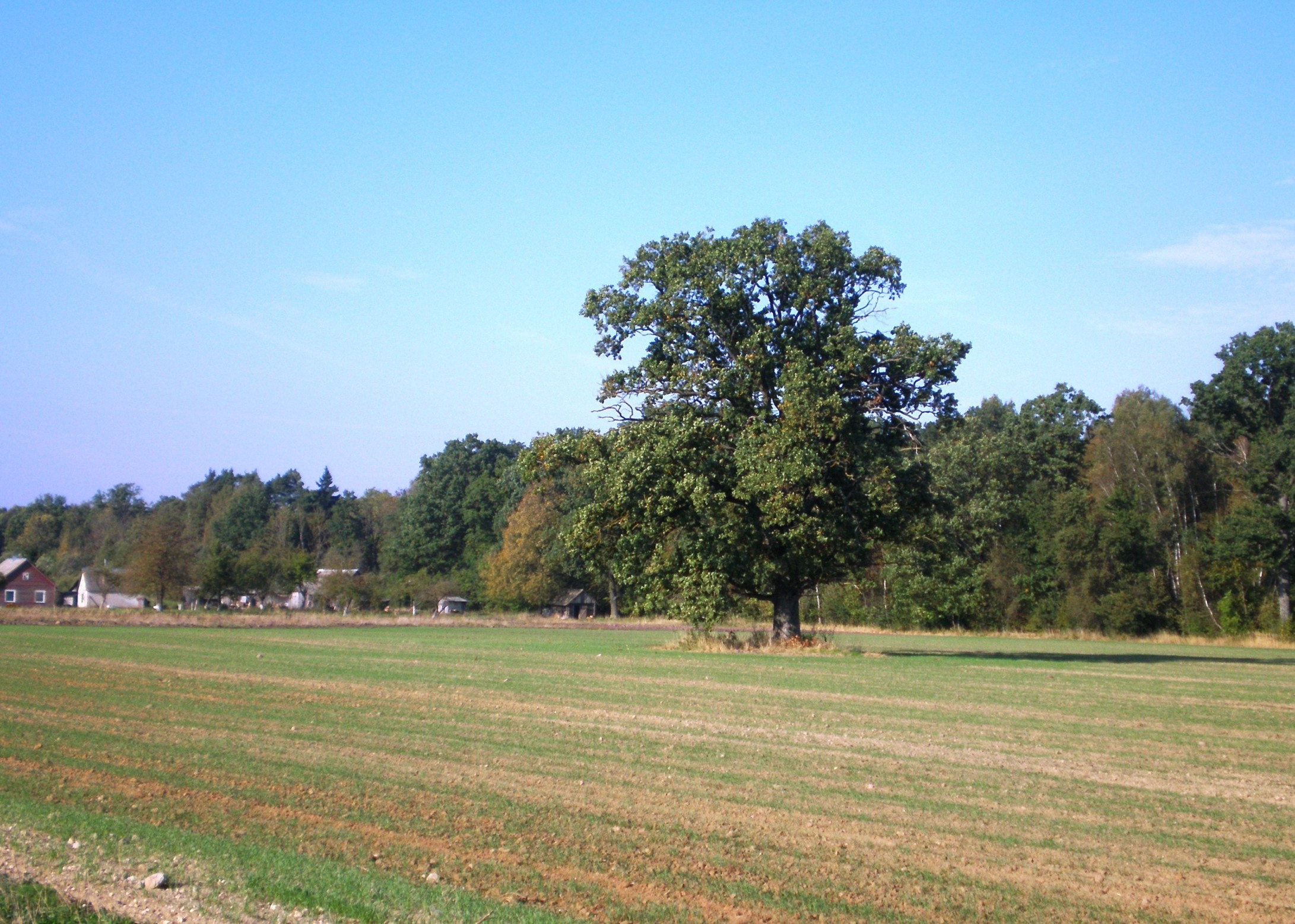
An old oak tree nearby

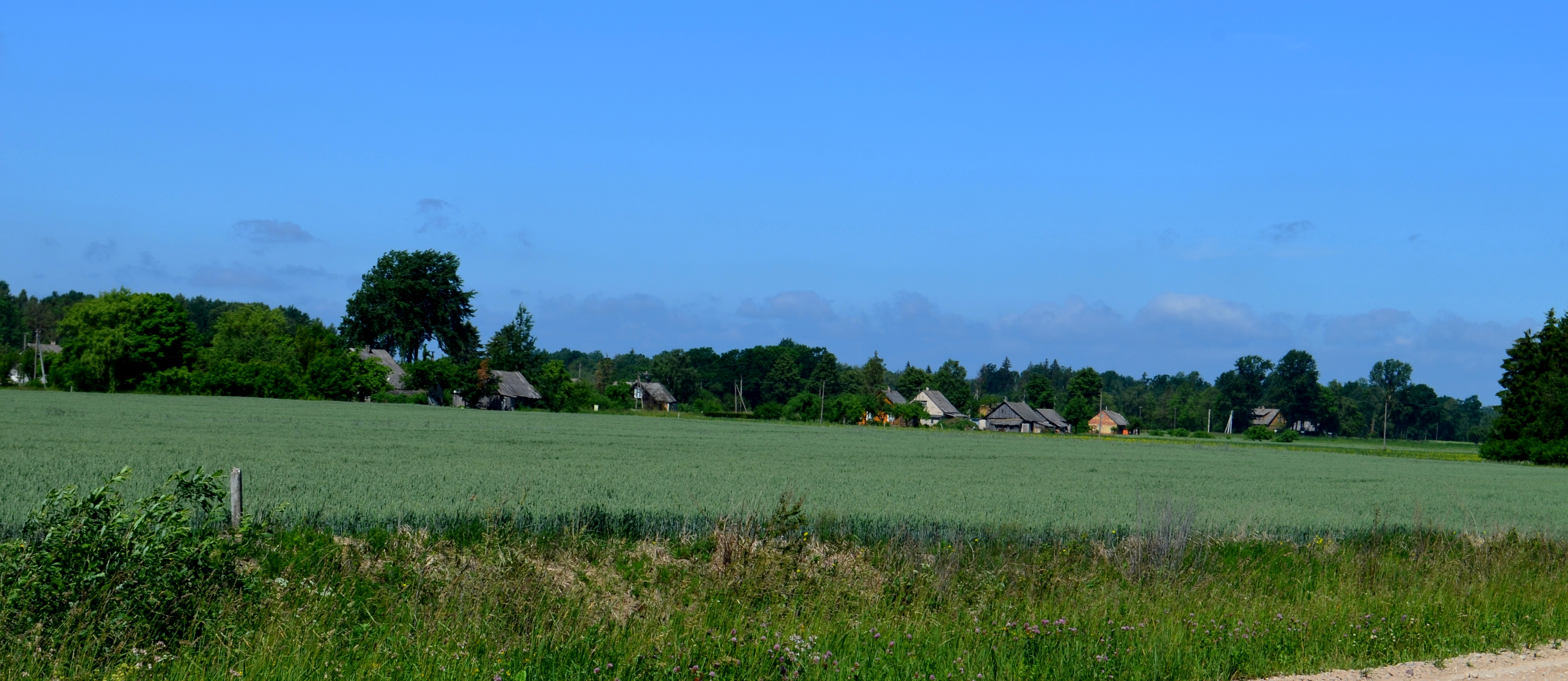
Southern part of Medininkai

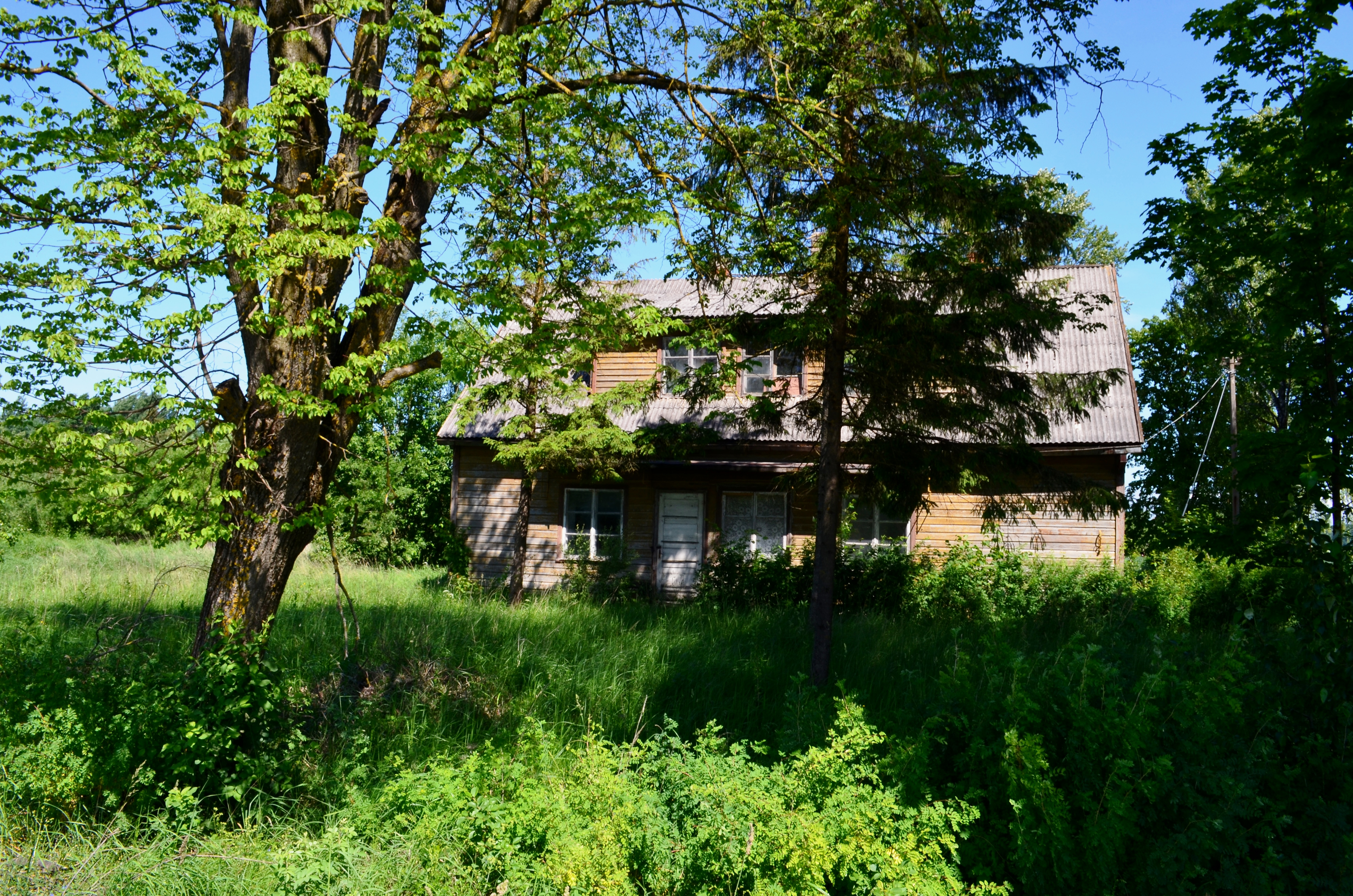
Former school building
