= Josvainiai Forest =

Forest in central Lithuania

Josvainiai Forest Lithuanian: Josvainių miškai
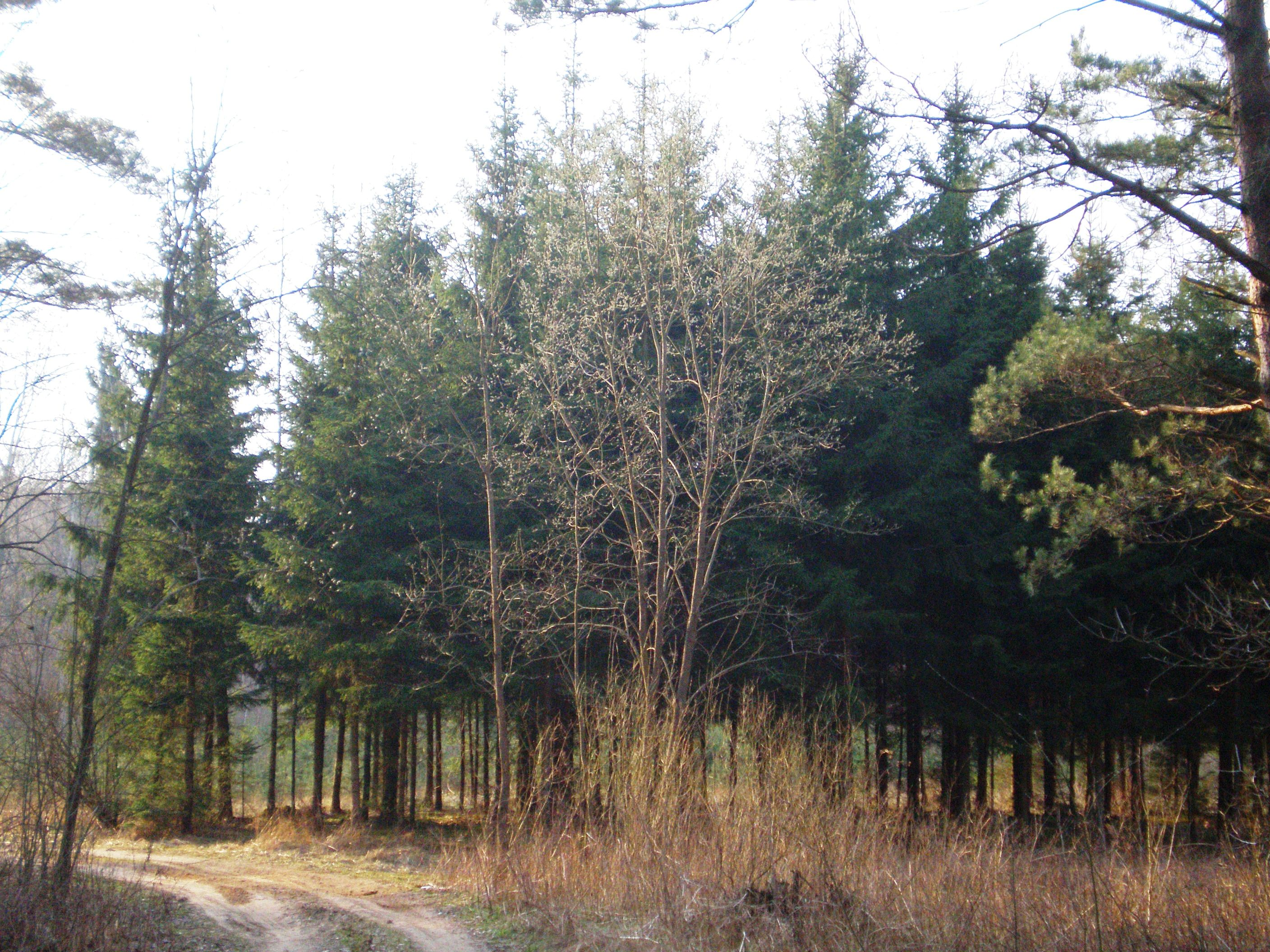
- Inside the forest at the surroundings of Keleriškiai

- Location within Lithuania
- Interactive map of Josvainiai Forest

Geography
- Location: Kėdainiai District Municipality, Lithuania
- Coordinates: 55.318°N 23.790°E
- Area: 31.1 km^{2} (12.0 sq mi)

Ecology
- Forest cover: birch, spruce, aspen
- Fauna: wild boar, roe deer, red fox

The Josvainiai Forest (Lithuanian: Josvainių miškai) is a forest in Kėdainiai District Municipality, central Lithuania, located 6 kilometres (3.7 mi) west of Kėdainiai and 4 km north of Josvainiai. It covers an area of 3,110 hectares (7,700 acres). It consists of a series of smaller forests; Josvainiai Forest (proper), Medininkai Forest, and Giraitė. The rivers Smilga, Smilgaitis and Tranys drain the forest as part of the Nevėžis basin.

As of 2005, 52% of the area was covered by birch, 24% by spruce, 5% by aspen, 8% by ash, 3% by oak, 3 % by black alder, 3% by grey alder, and 2% by pine. The fauna of the forest consists of wild boar, roe deer, red fox, raccoon dog, pine marten, as well as hazel grouse, black storks, Eurasian woodcocks, common buzzards, sparrowhawks, northern goshawk, and owls. The forest is included in the Dotnuva-Josvainiai Biosphere Polygon, and includes the Smilga Landscape Sanctuary.

During the Soviet era, a now ruined rocket base was sited in the forest near Keleriškiai. The villages of Barsukynė, Palainiškiai, Čiukiškiai and Stasiūnai, and Grašva are inside the forest or on its edges.

== Images ==
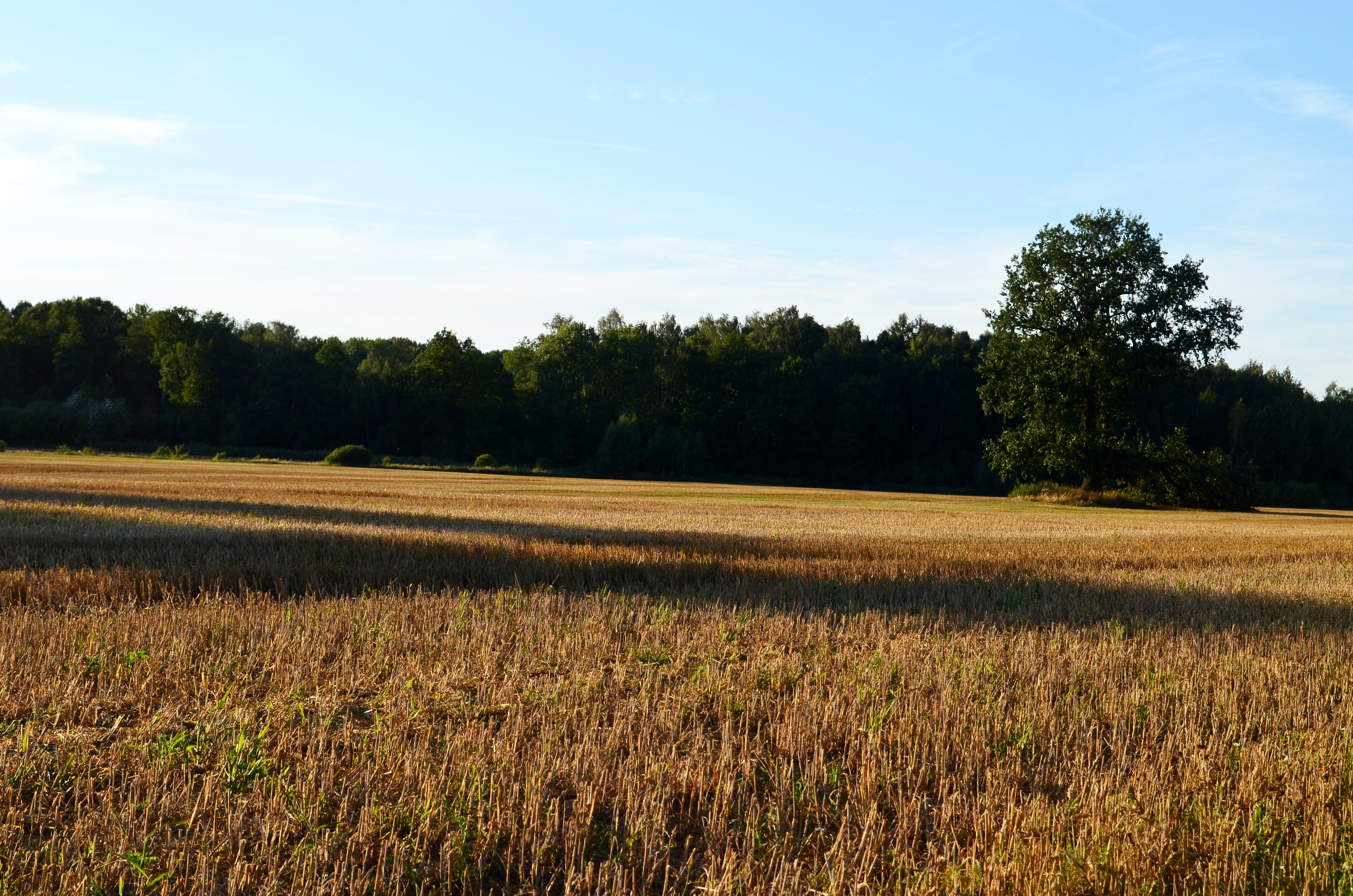
Forest nearby Šiukštuliškiai village

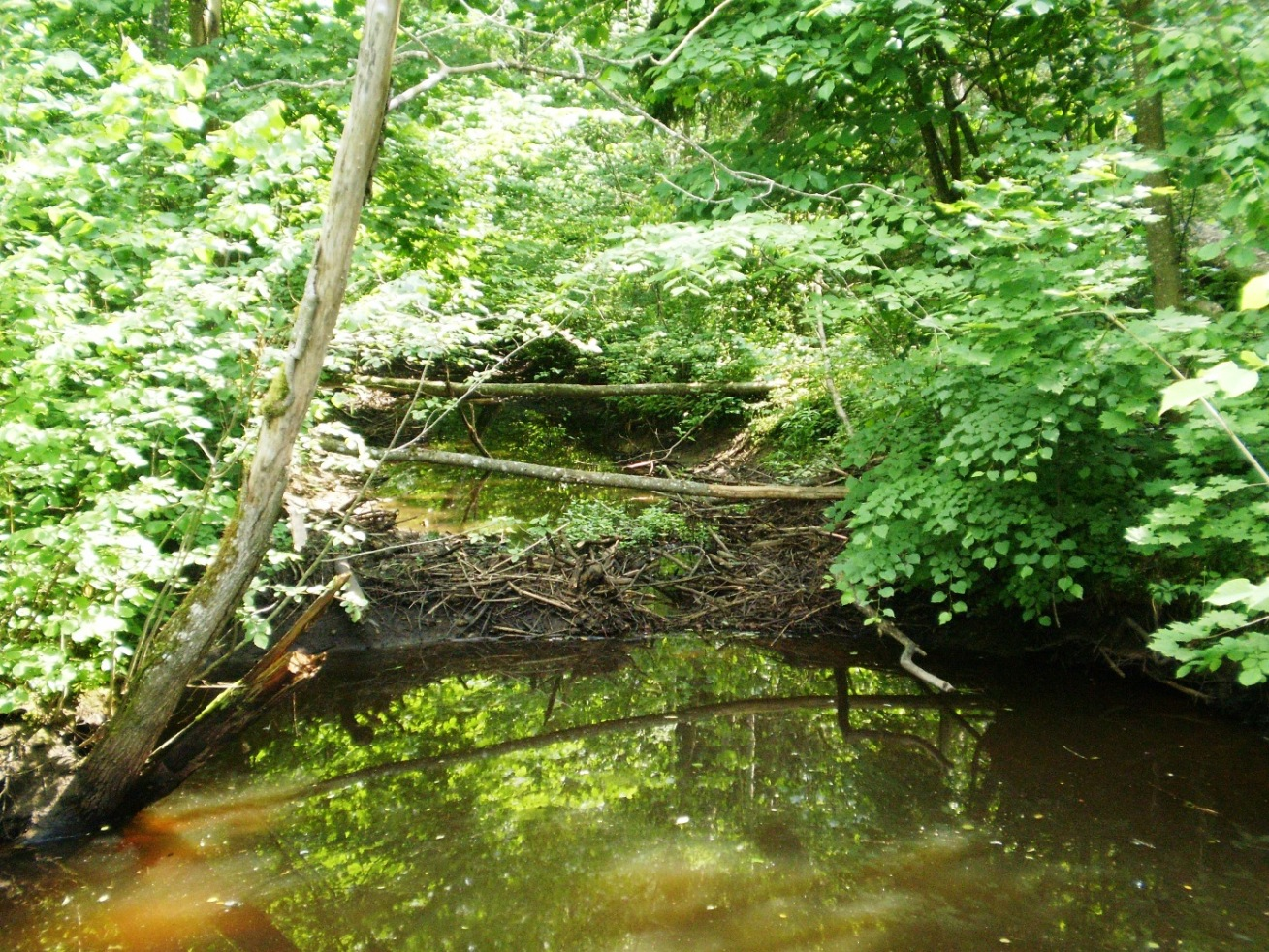
The Smilga River inside the forest

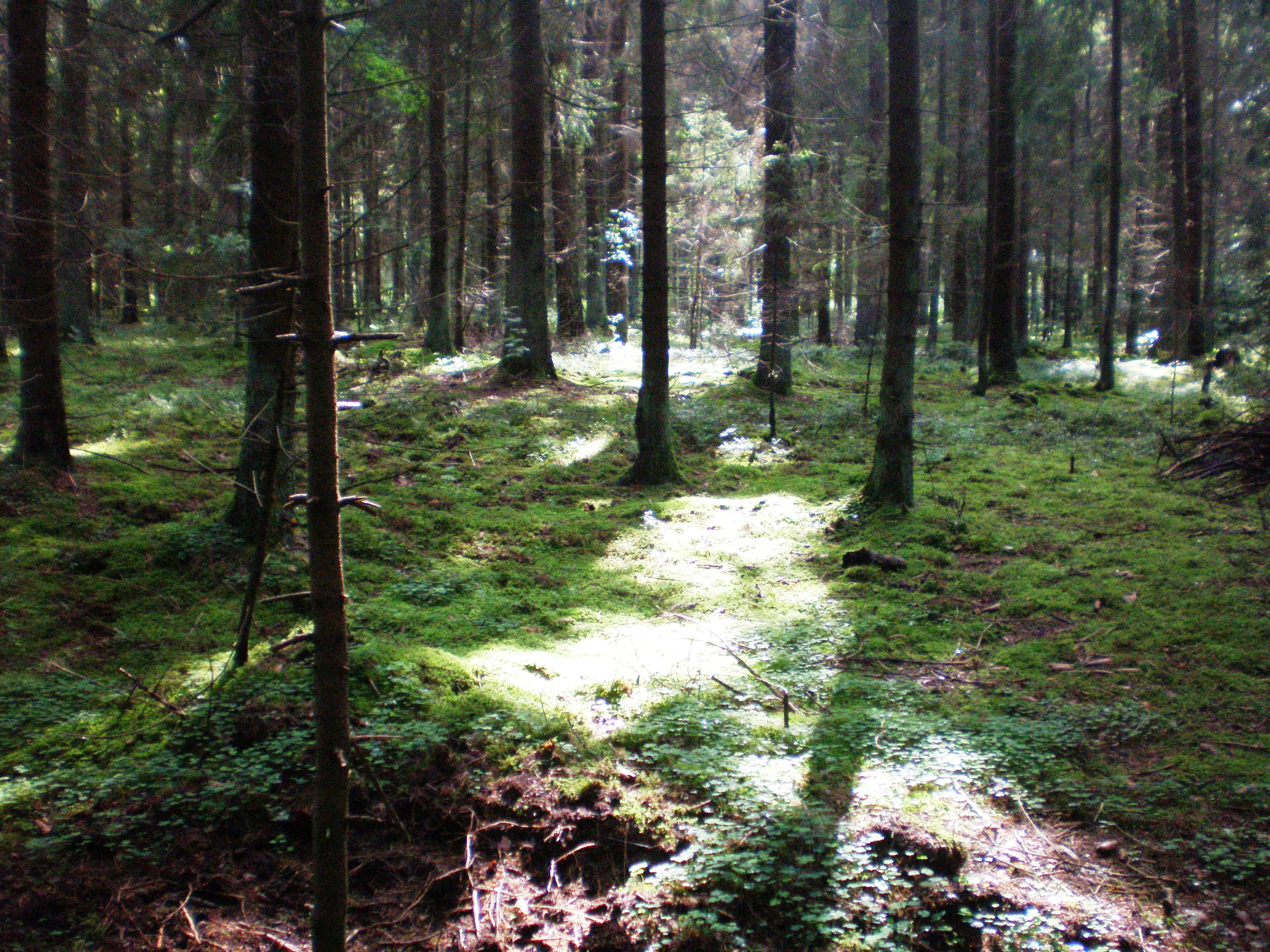
A spruce forest with oxalis acetosella floor

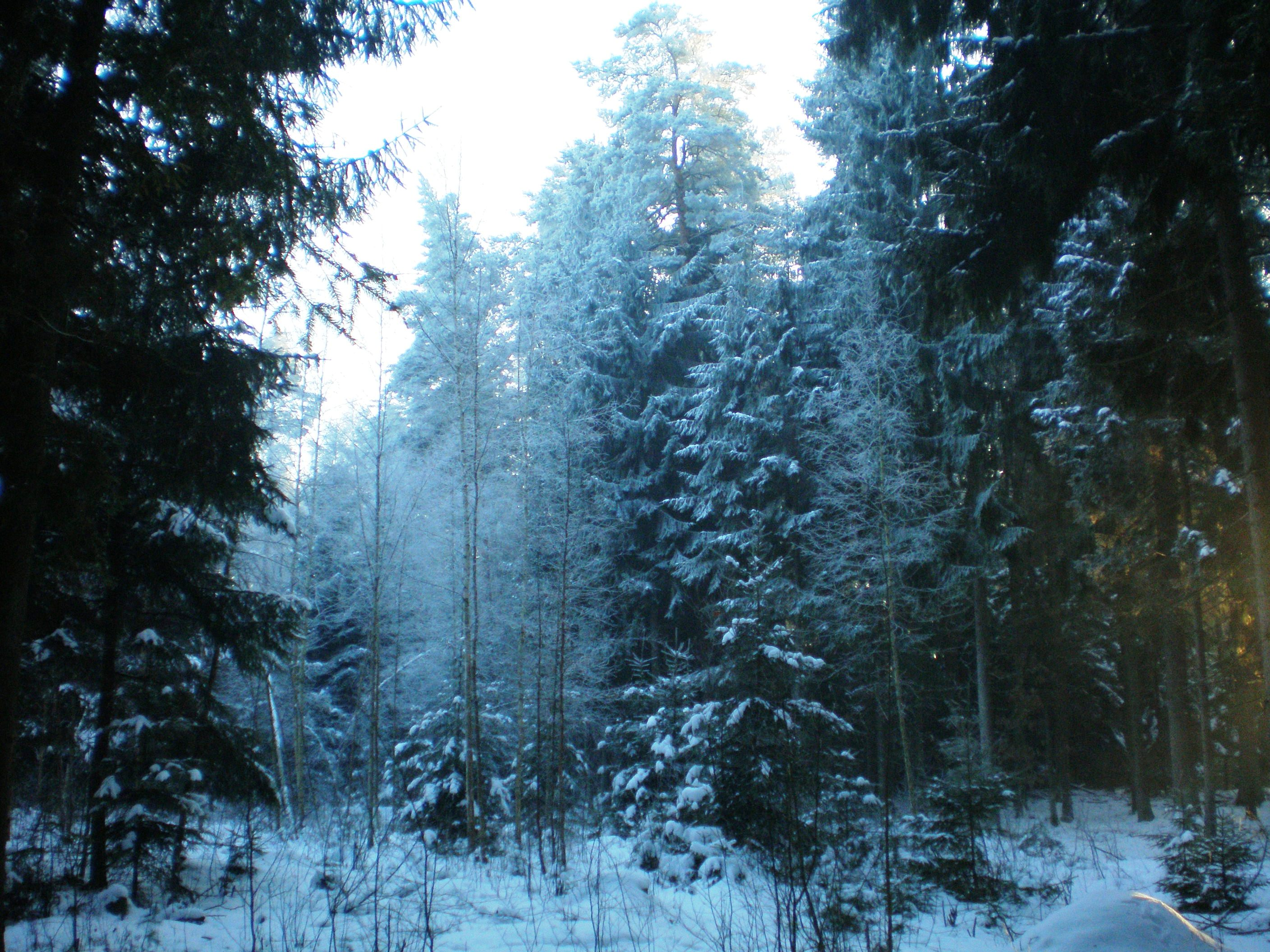
Forest in winter

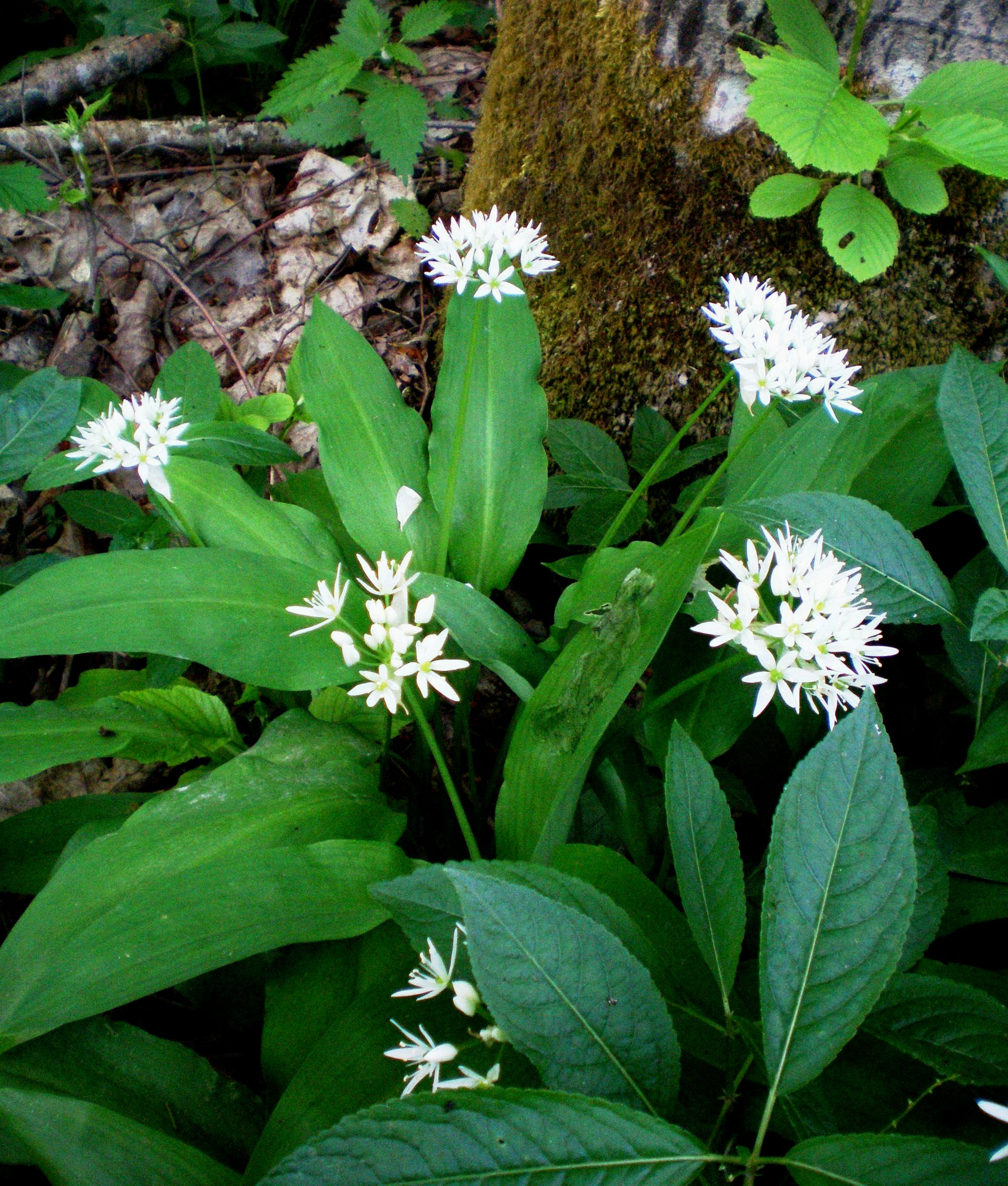
Allium ursinum in the forest
