= Šiukštuliškiai =

- Village
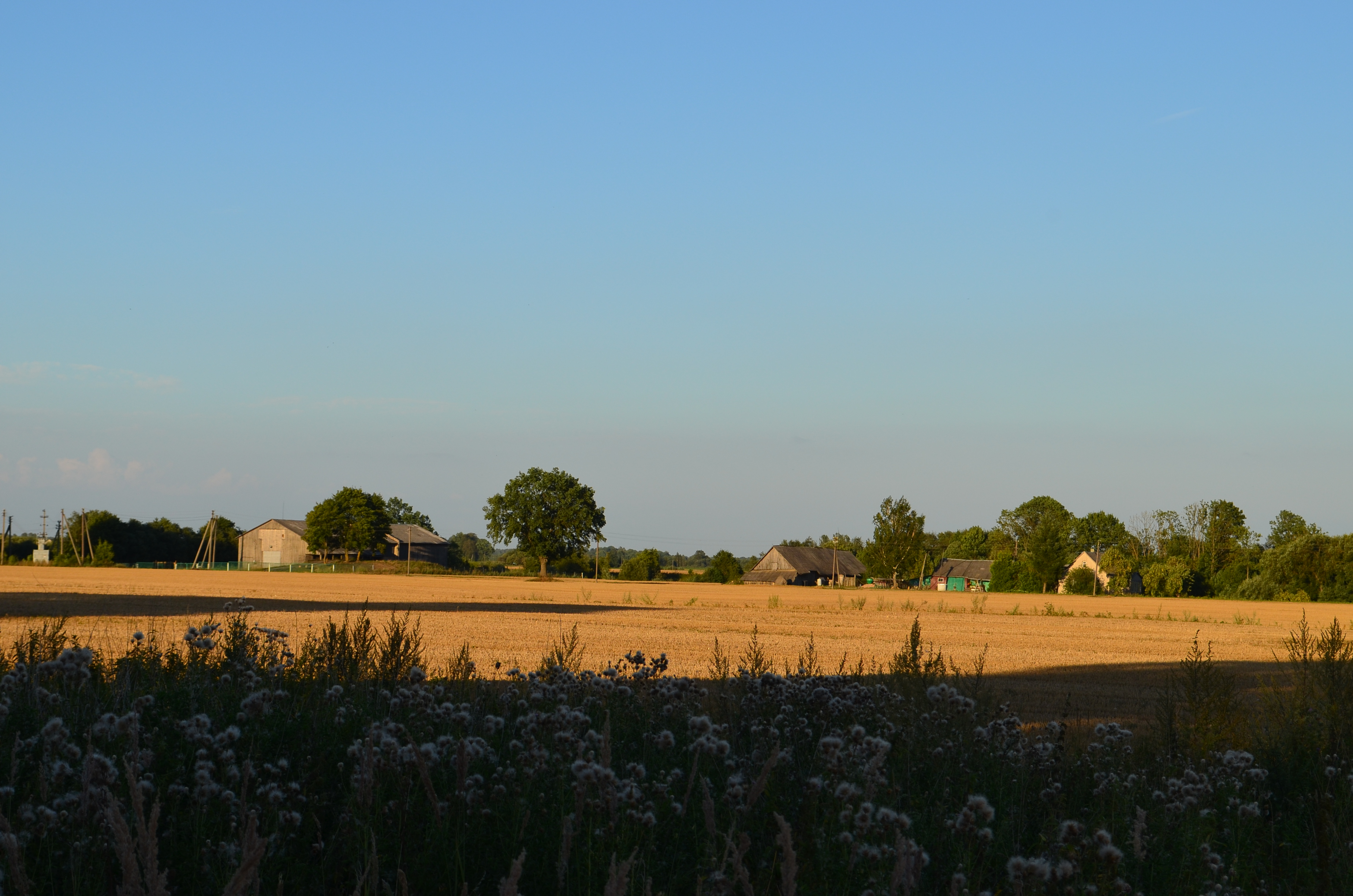

- Location in Lithuania Šiukštuliškiai (Lithuania)
- Coordinates: 55°17′49″N 23°51′29″E
- Country: Lithuania
- County: Kaunas County
- Municipality: Kėdainiai district municipality
- Eldership: Kėdainiai City Eldership

Population (2011)
  - Total: 3
- Time zone: UTC+2 (EET)
  - Summer (DST): UTC+3 (EEST)

Šiukštuliškiai (historically Polish: Szuksztuliszki, Russian: Шукштолишки) is a village in Kėdainiai district municipality, in Kaunas County, in central Lithuania. It is located by the Smilga and Smilgaitis rivers, nearby Josvainiai forest. According to the 2011 census, the village has a population of 3 people.

== Demography ==
Historical population

Year	Pop.	±% p.a.
1902	59	—
1923	79	+1.40%
1959	52	−1.15%
1970	36	−3.29%

Year	Pop.	±% p.a.
1979	12	−11.49%
1989	10	−1.81%
2001	13	+2.21%
2011	3	−13.64%

Source: 1902, 1923, 1959 & 1970, 1979, 1989, 2001, 2011
