= Čiukiškiai =

- Village
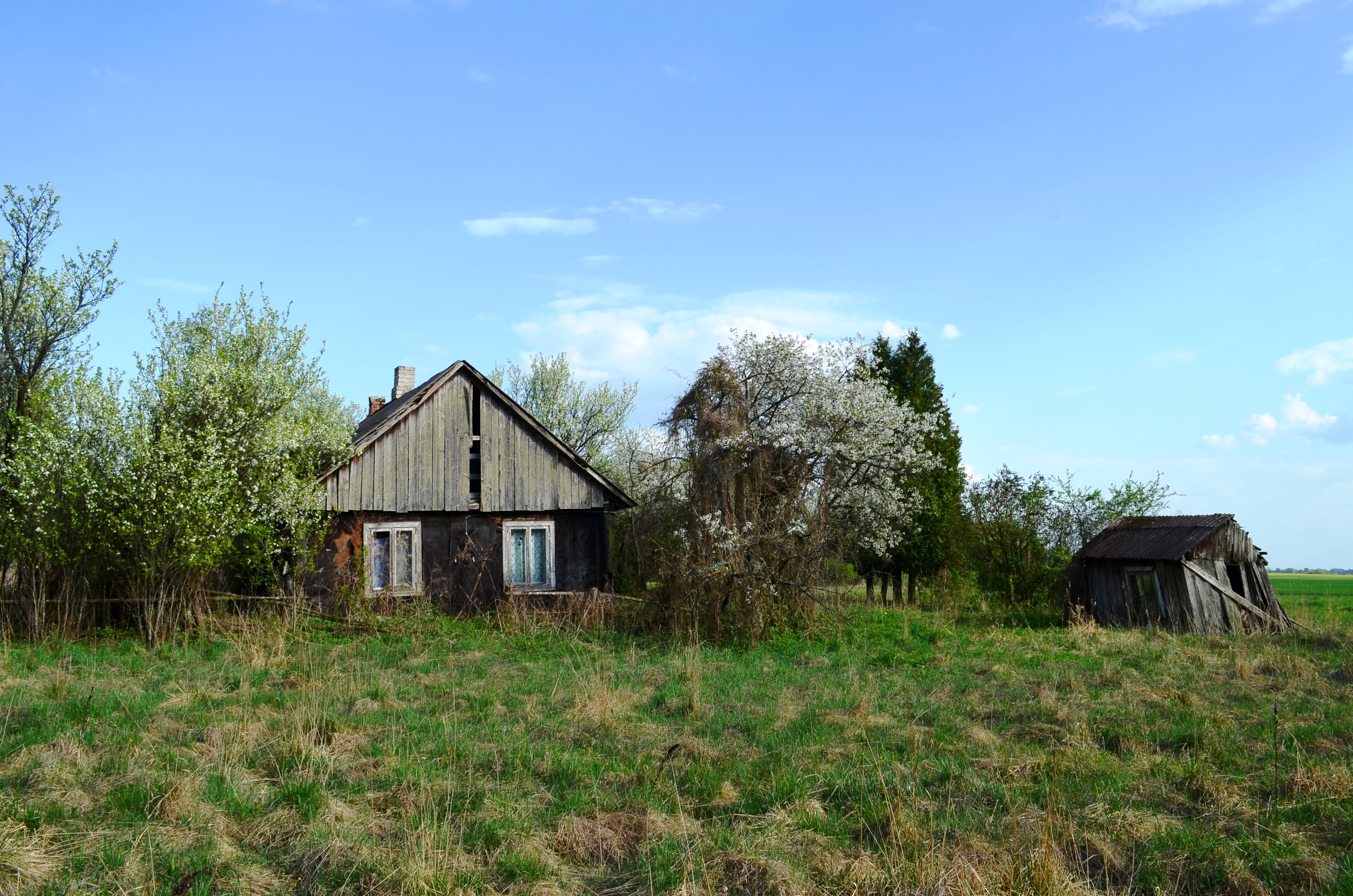

- Location in Lithuania Čiukiškiai (Lithuania)
- Coordinates: 55°16′30″N 23°49′52″E
- Country: Lithuania
- County: Kaunas County
- Municipality: Kėdainiai district municipality
- Eldership: Josvainiai Eldership

Population (2011)
  - Total: 0
- Time zone: UTC+2 (EET)
  - Summer (DST): UTC+3 (EEST)

Čiukiškiai (formerly Russian: Чукишки, Polish: Czukiszki) is a village in Kėdainiai district municipality, in Kaunas County, in central Lithuania. According to the 2011 census, the village was uninhabited. It is located 3.5 kilometres (2.2 mi) from Josvainiai, on the edge of the Josvainiai Forest, nearby the Šušvė river. There is a pig farm. An ancient burial place is located next to the village.

== History ==
The first mention of Čiukiškiai is dated in 1593. There were 31 voloks of the land at that time. Two ancient axes have been found in the village.

== Demography ==
Historical population

Year	Pop.	±% p.a.
1902	224	—
1923	118	−3.01%
1959	107	−0.27%
1970	109	+0.17%
1979	10	−23.31%

Year	Pop.	±% p.a.
1984	9	−2.09%
1989	10	+2.13%
2001	2	−12.55%
2011	0	−100.00%

Source: 1902, 1923, 1959 & 1970, 1979, 1989, 2001, 2011

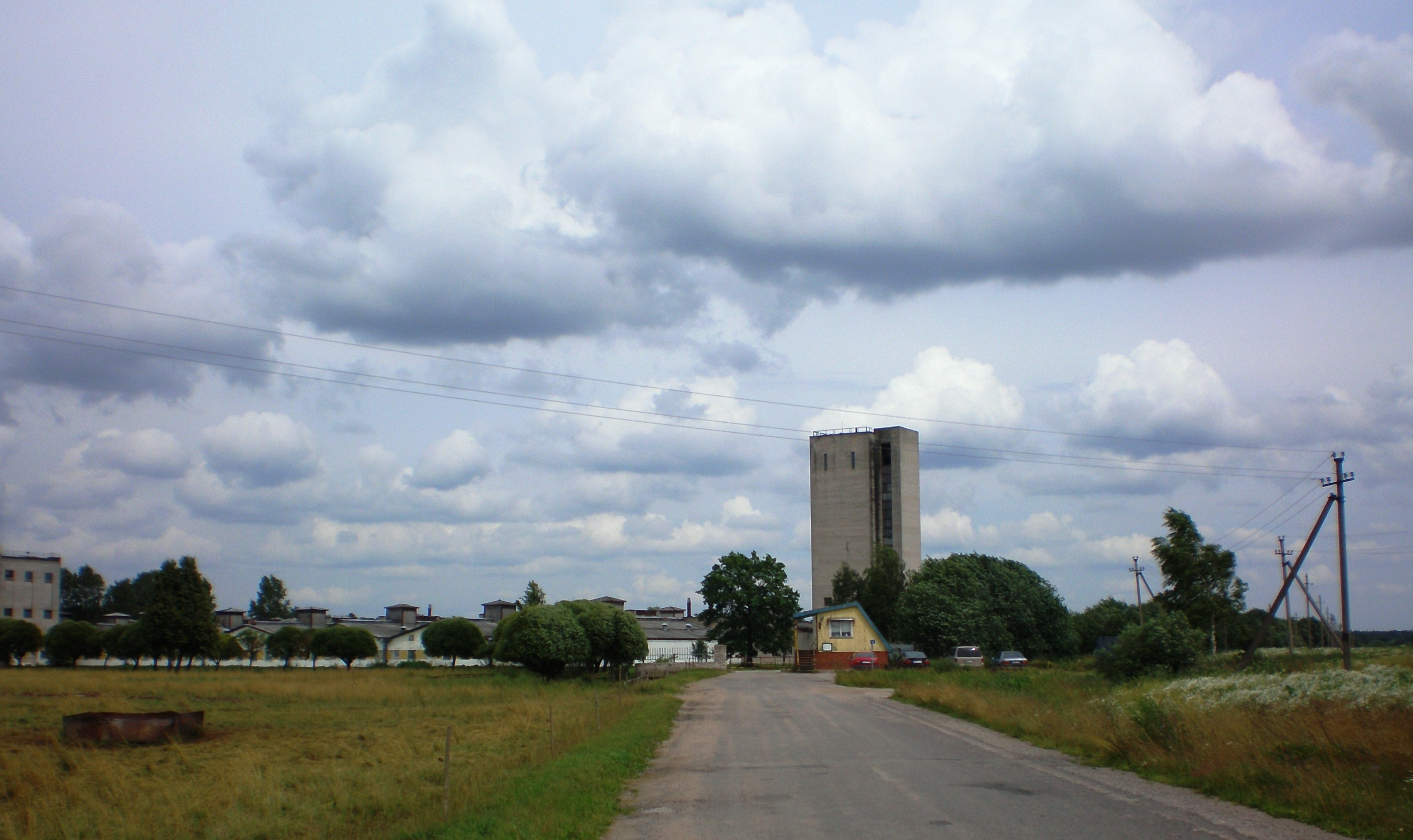
Čiukiškiai pig farm
