= Patranys =

- Village
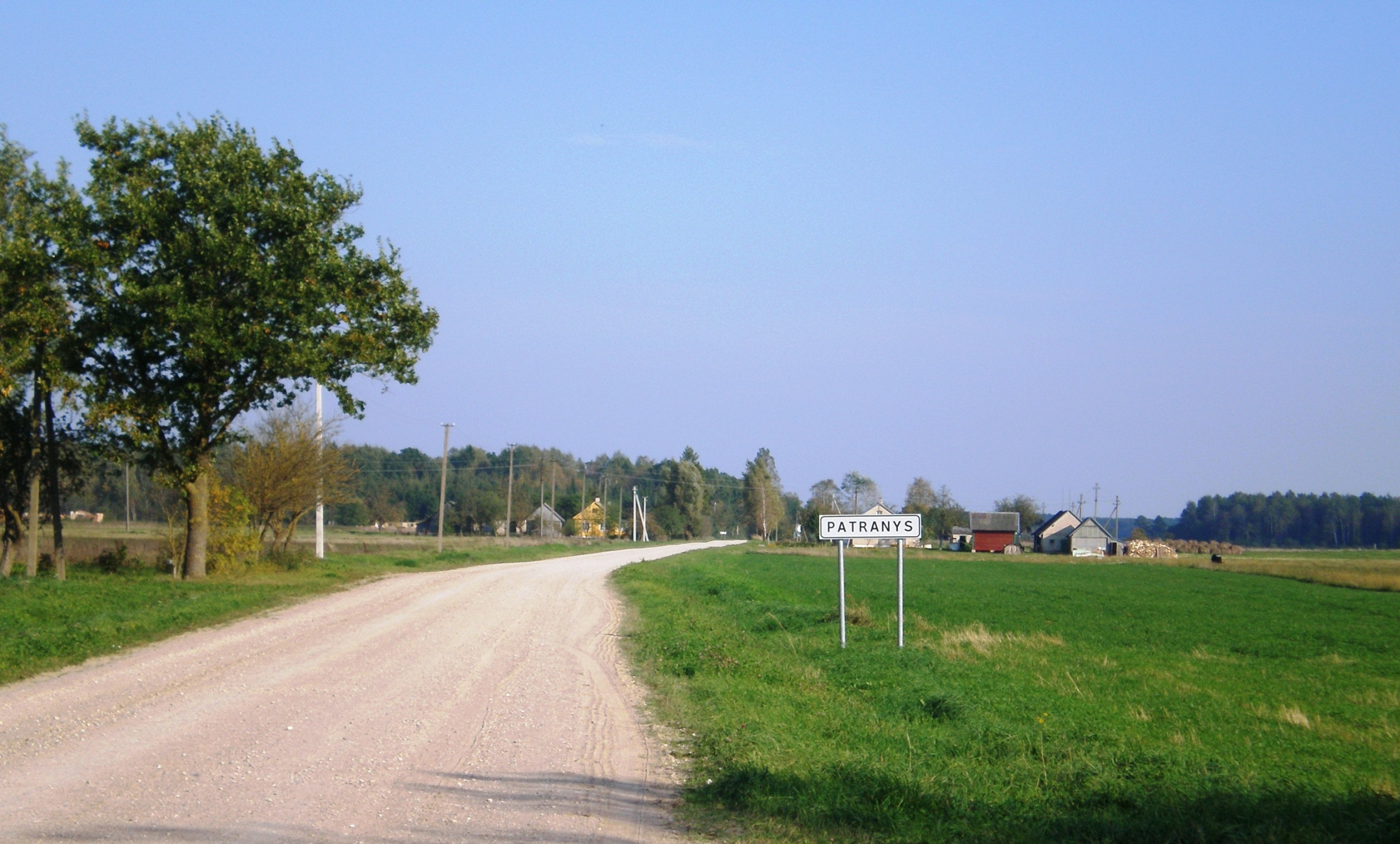

- Location in Lithuania Patranys (Lithuania)
- Coordinates: 55°21′22″N 23°45′11″E
- Country: Lithuania
- County: Kaunas County
- Municipality: Kėdainiai district municipality
- Eldership: Krakės Eldership

Population (2011)
  - Total: 10
- Time zone: UTC+2 (EET)
  - Summer (DST): UTC+3 (EEST)

Patranys (formerly Russian: Потранисъ) is a village in Kėdainiai district municipality, in Kaunas County, in central Lithuania. According to the 2011 census, the village had a population of 10 people. It is located 4 kilometres (2.5 mi) from Meironiškiai, by the Tranys river, close to the source of the Smilga river.

== Demography ==
Historical population

Year	Pop.	±% p.a.
1902	22	—
1959	20	−0.17%
1970	41	+6.74%
1979	21	−7.16%

Year	Pop.	±% p.a.
1989	0	−100.00%
2001	14	—
2011	10	−3.31%

Source: 1902, 1923, 1959 & 1970, 1979, 1989, 2001, 2011
