= Medininkai Eldership =

Medininkai Eldership Medininkų seniūnija
- Eldership
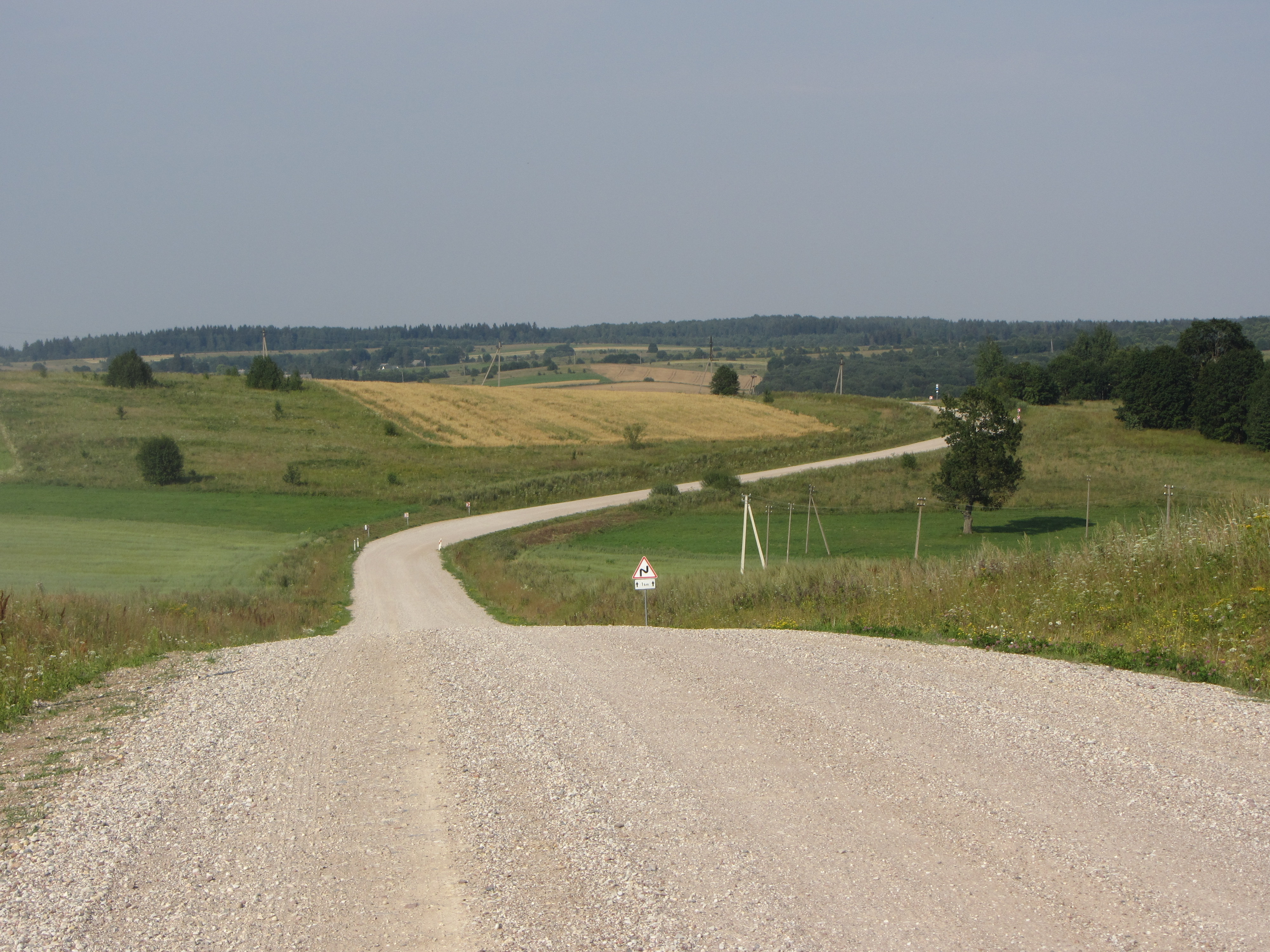

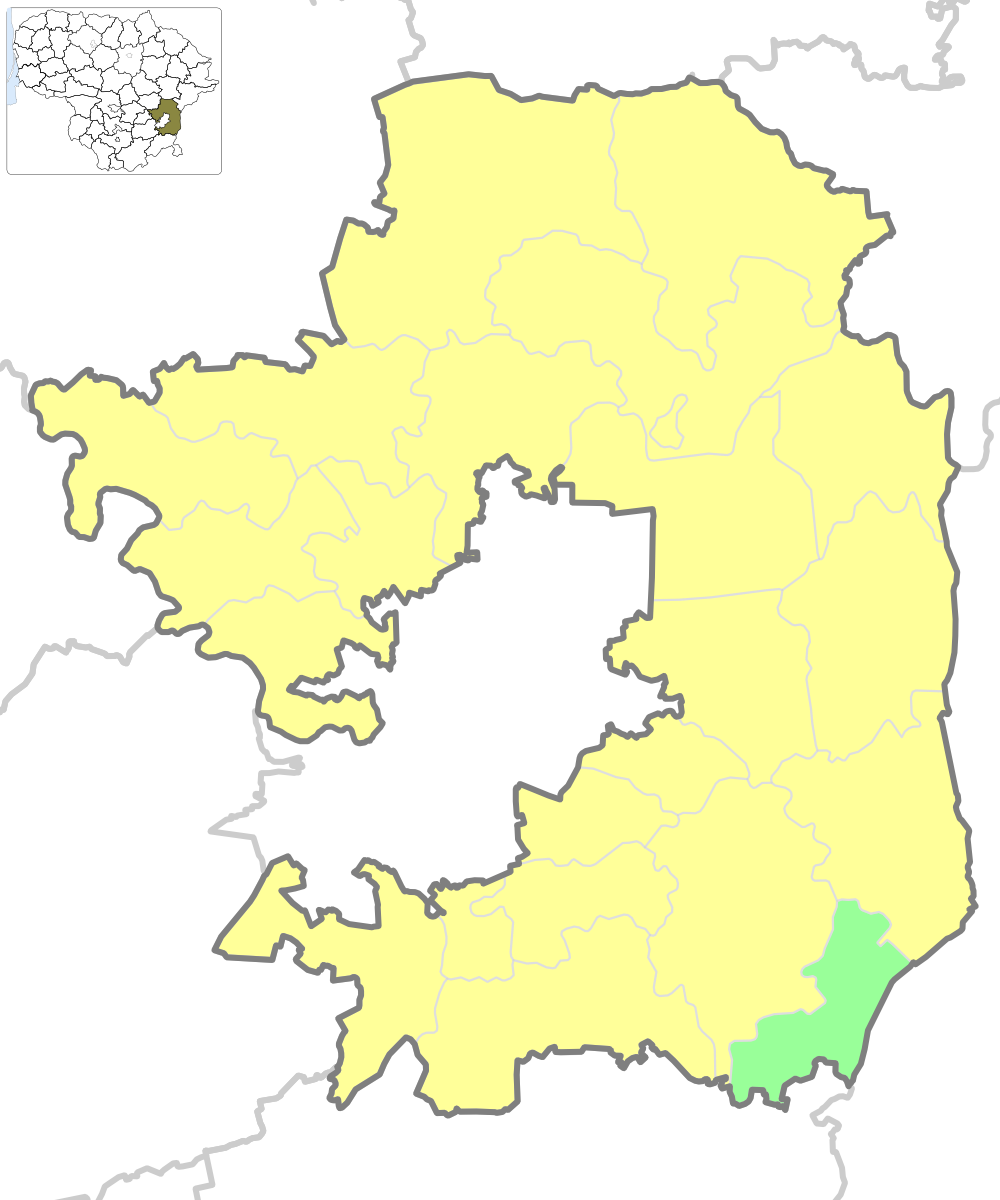
- Location of Medininkai Eldership
- Country: Lithuania
- Ethnographic region: Dzūkija
- County: Vilnius County
- Municipality: Vilnius District Municipality
- Administrative centre: Medininkai

Area
  - Total: 63 km^{2} (24 sq mi)

Population
  - Total: 953
  - Density: 15/km^{2} (39/sq mi)
- Time zone: UTC+2 (EET)
  - Summer (DST): UTC+3 (EEST)
- Website: https://www.vrsa.lt

Medininkai Eldership (Lithuanian: Medininkų seniūnija) is an eldership in Lithuania, located in Vilnius District Municipality, east of Vilnius.

== Ethnic composition ==
According to 2011 National Census data, the ethnic composition is as follows:

- Poles - 80%
- Belarusians - 7.3%
- Lithuanians - 6.5%
