= Keleriškiai =

- Village
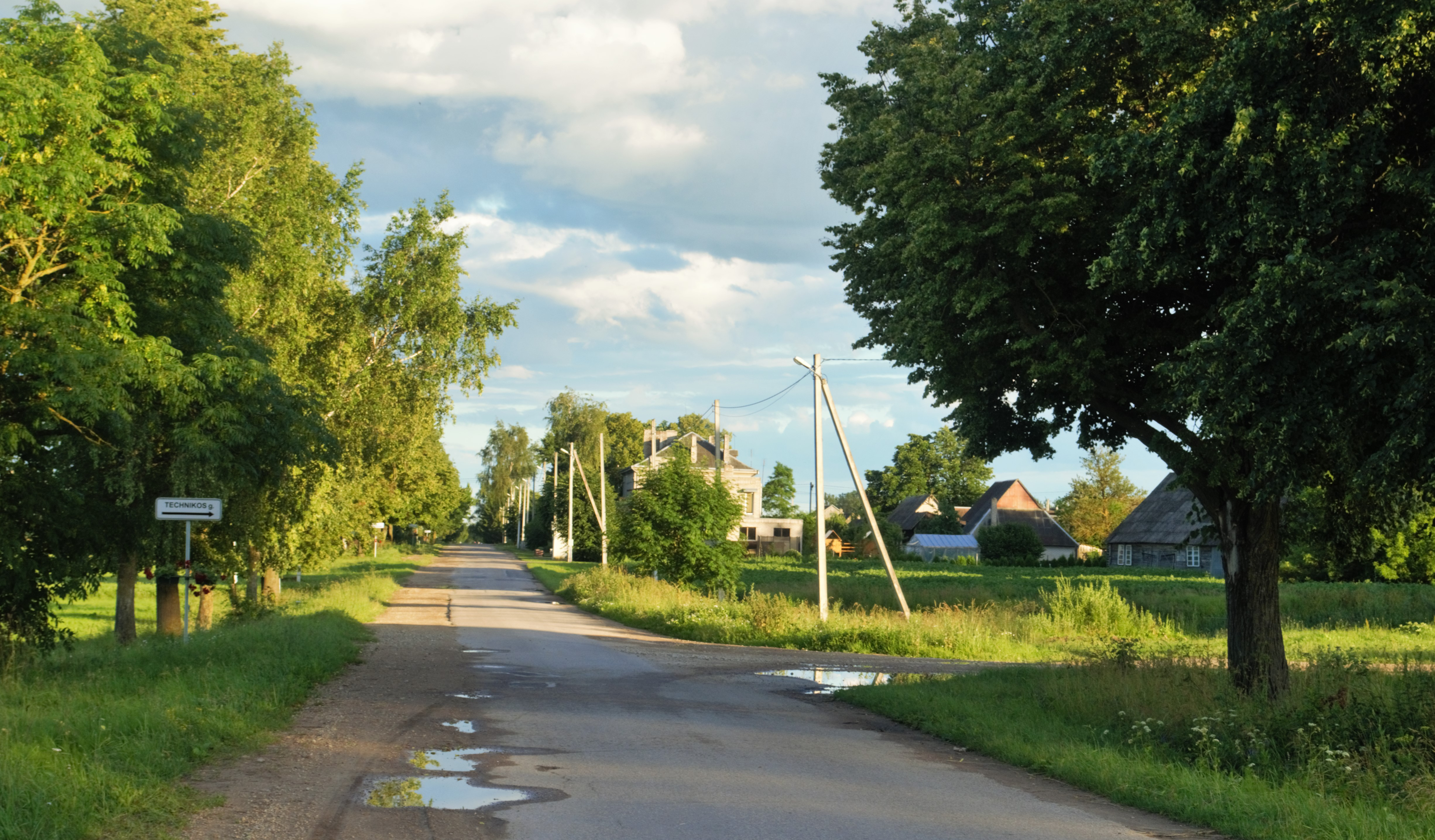

- Location in Lithuania Keleriškiai (Lithuania)
- Coordinates: 55°16′40″N 23°55′10″E
- Country: Lithuania
- County: Kaunas County
- Municipality: Kėdainiai
- Eldership: Kėdainiai City Eldership

Population (2011)
  - Total: 351
- Time zone: UTC+2 (EET)
  - Summer (DST): UTC+3 (EEST)

Keleriškiai is a village in Kėdainiai district municipality, in Kaunas County, central Lithuania. According to the 2011 census, the village has a population of 351 people.

== Demography ==
Historical population

Year	Pop.	±% p.a.
1923	17	—
1959	41	+2.48%
1970	227	+16.83%
1979	365	+5.42%

Year	Pop.	±% p.a.
1985	363	−0.09%
1989	380	+1.15%
2001	385	+0.11%
2011	351	−0.92%

Source: 1902, 1923, 1959 & 1970, 1979, 1989, 2001, 2011

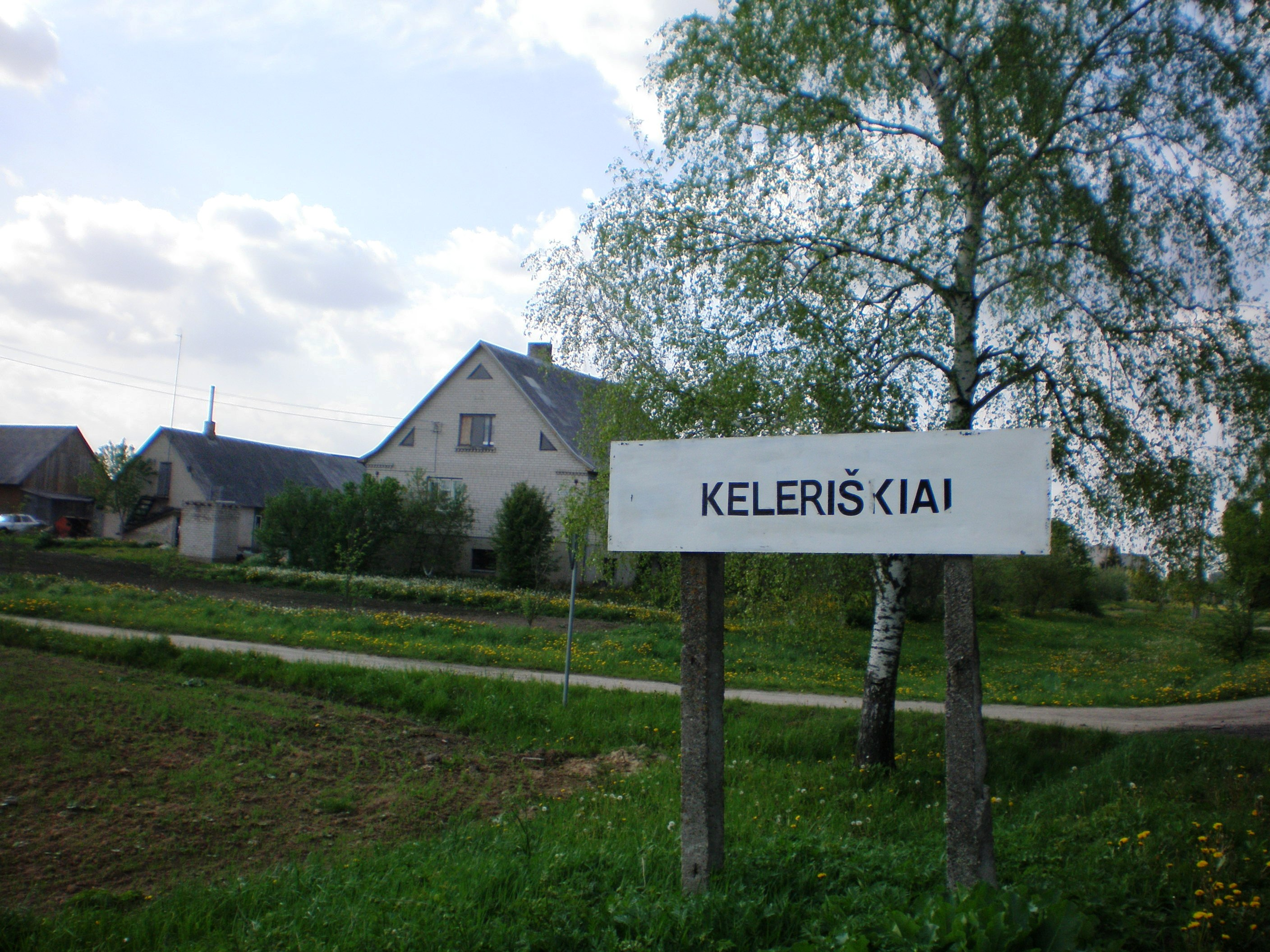
Keleriškiai road sign
