= Krakės–Dotnuva Forest =

Forest in Kėdainiai District Municipality, central Lithuania

Krakės-Dotnuva Forest Lithuanian: Krakių-Dotnuvos miškai
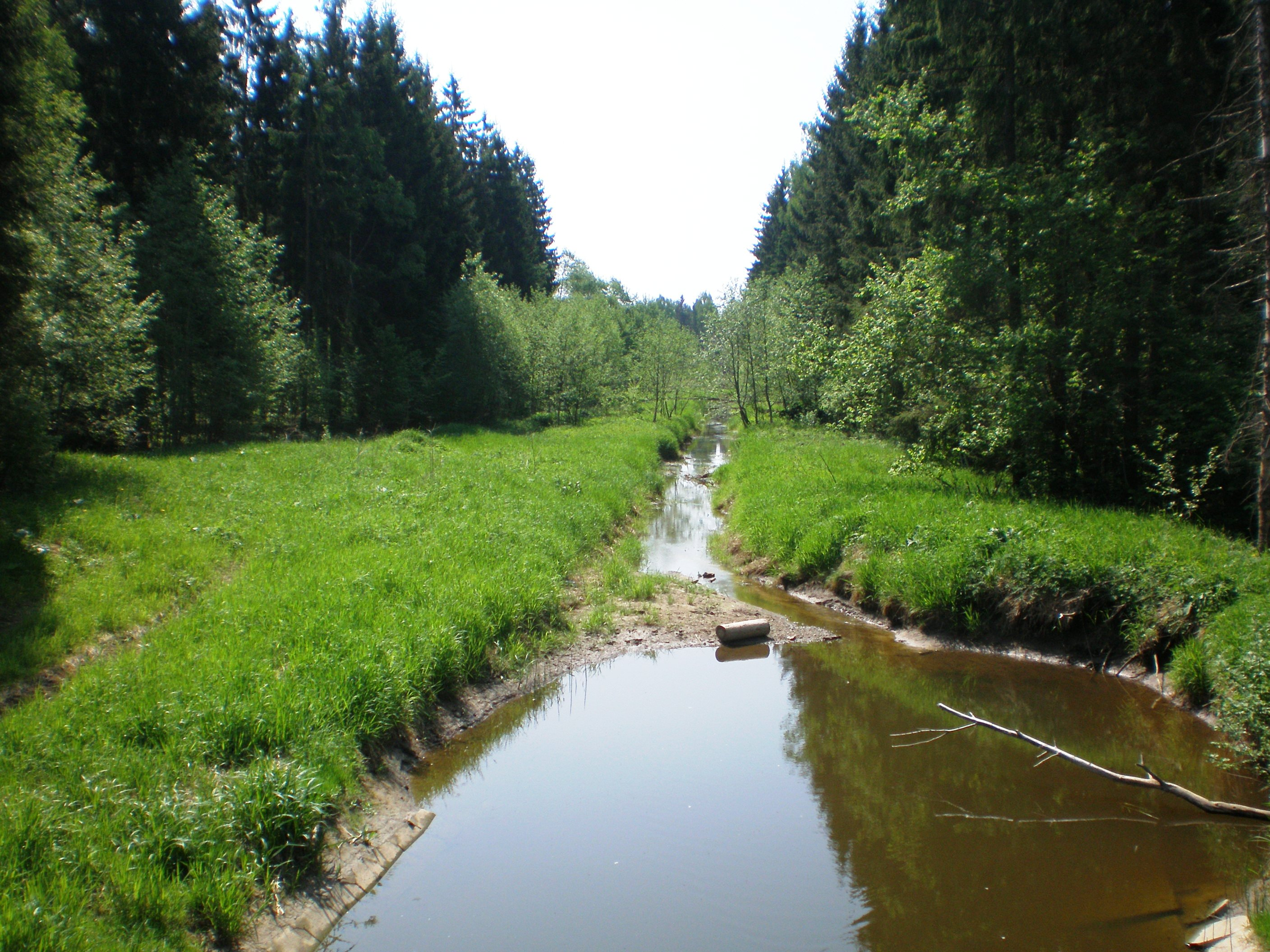
- The Jaugila river running through the forest

- Location within Lithuania
- Interactive map of Krakės-Dotnuva Forest

Geography
- Location: Kėdainiai District Municipality, Lithuania
- Coordinates: 55.383°N 23.766°E
- Area: 32.8 km^{2} (12.7 sq mi)

Ecology
- Forest cover: birch, spruce, aspen
- Fauna: moose, wild boar, roe deer, red deer

The Krakės–Dotnuva Forest (Lithuanian: Krakių-Dotnuvos miškai) is a forest in Kėdainiai District Municipality, central Lithuania, located 1.5 km from Krakės and 4 km from Dotnuva. It covers 32.8 km^{2} area. The rivers Jaugila, Smilgaitis, Tranys, Girotakis drain the forest.

As of 2005, 38% of the area was covered by birch, 25% by spruce, 13% by aspen, 8% by ash, 7% by oak tree groups. The fauna of the forest consists of moose, wild boar, roe deer, red deer, also there are beavers, black storks, middle spotted woodpeckers. The forest is included into Dotnuva-Josvainiai Biosphere Polygon.
