= Vailainiai =

- Village
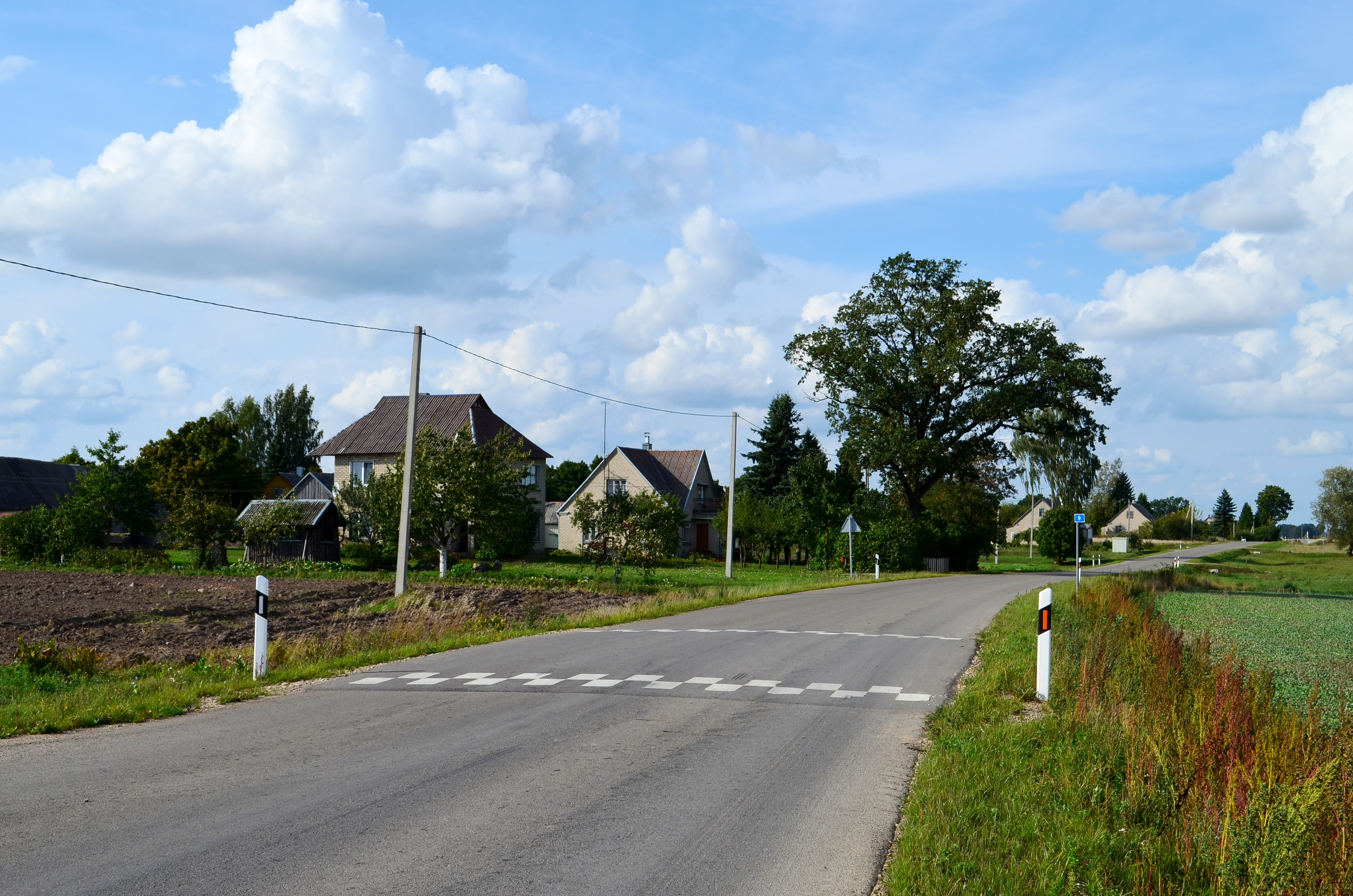

- Location in Lithuania Vailainiai (Lithuania)
- Coordinates: 55°28′41″N 23°40′01″E
- Country: Lithuania
- County: Kaunas County
- Municipality: Kėdainiai district municipality
- Eldership: Krakės Eldership

Population (2011)
  - Total: 23
- Time zone: UTC+2 (EET)
  - Summer (DST): UTC+3 (EEST)

Vailainiai (formerly Russian: Валайне, Polish: Wajłajnie) is a village in Kėdainiai district municipality, in Kaunas County, in central Lithuania. According to the 2011 census, the village had a population of 23 people. It is located 2 kilometres (1.2 mi) from Barkūniškis, by the Šušvė river (and its tributaries the Krimslė and the Vinkšnupis), alongside the Grinkiškis-Krakės road. There is a cemetery.

== Demography ==
Historical population

Year	Pop.	±% p.a.
1902	214	—
1923	126	−2.49%
1959	90	−0.93%
1970	75	−1.64%

Year	Pop.	±% p.a.
1979	70	−0.76%
1989	59	−1.70%
2001	50	−1.37%
2011	23	−7.47%

Source: 1902, 1923, 1959 & 1970, 1979, 1989, 2001, 2011

== Images ==
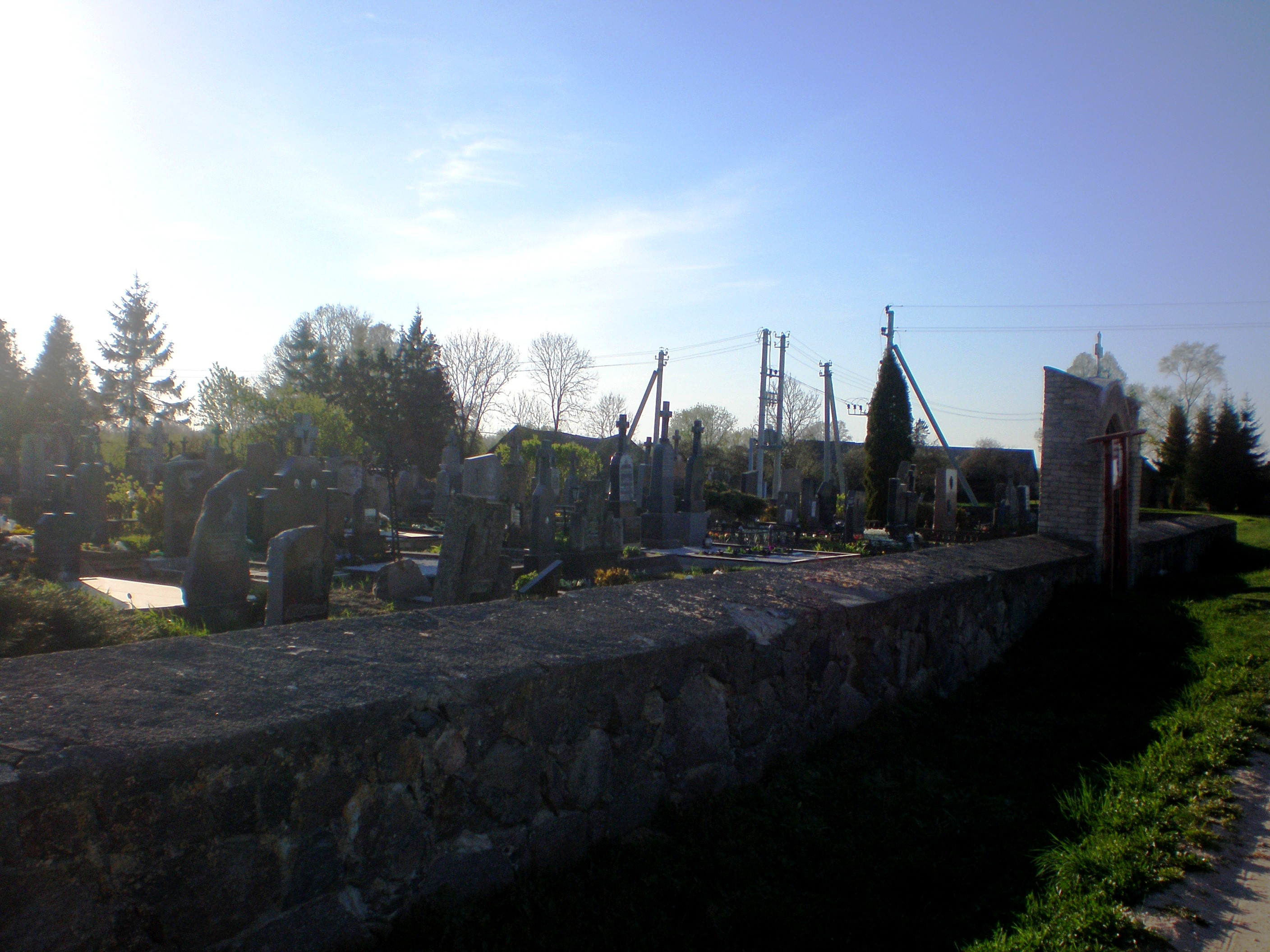
Cemetery

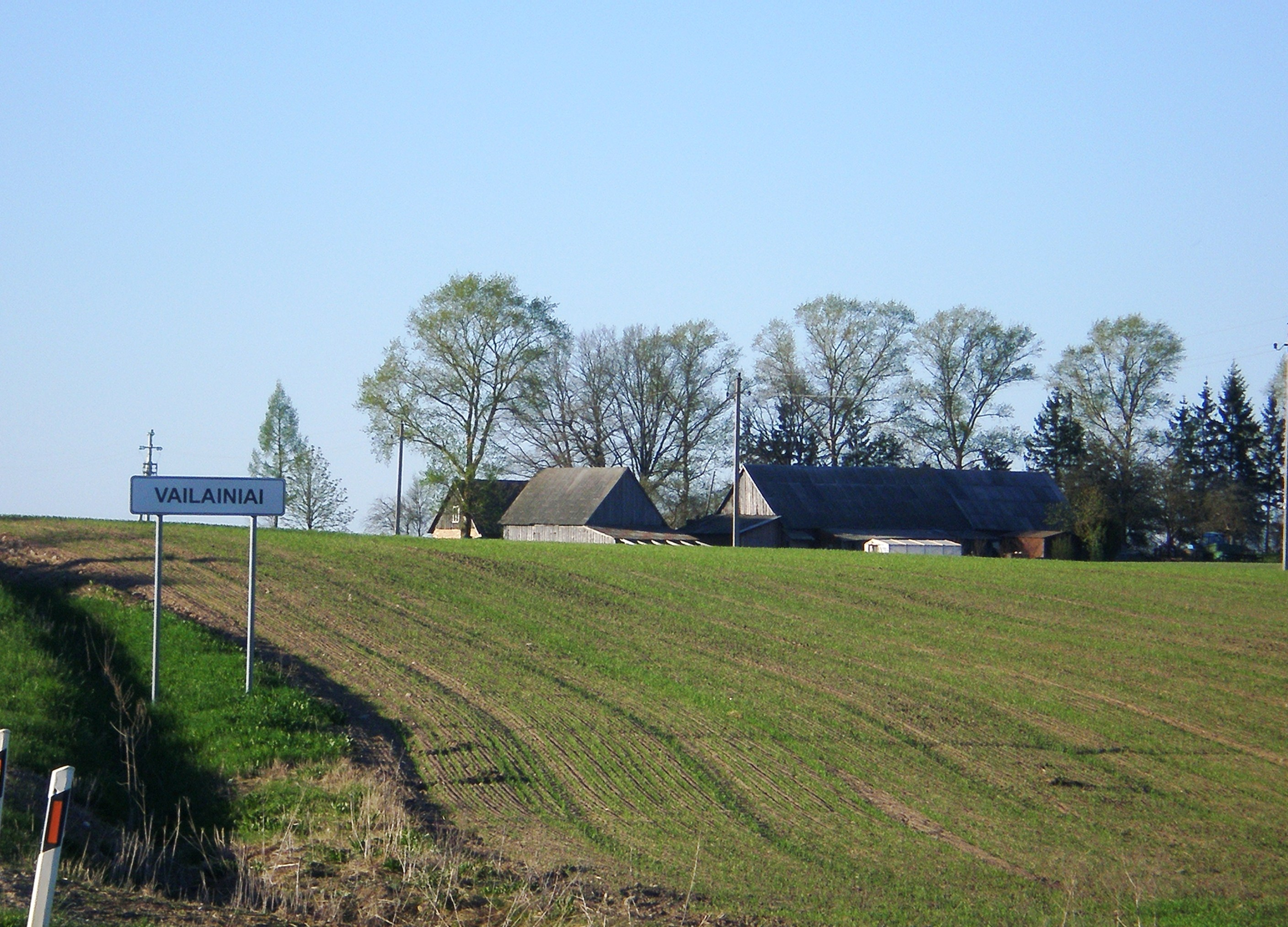
Village from the south
