= Čystapolis =

- Village
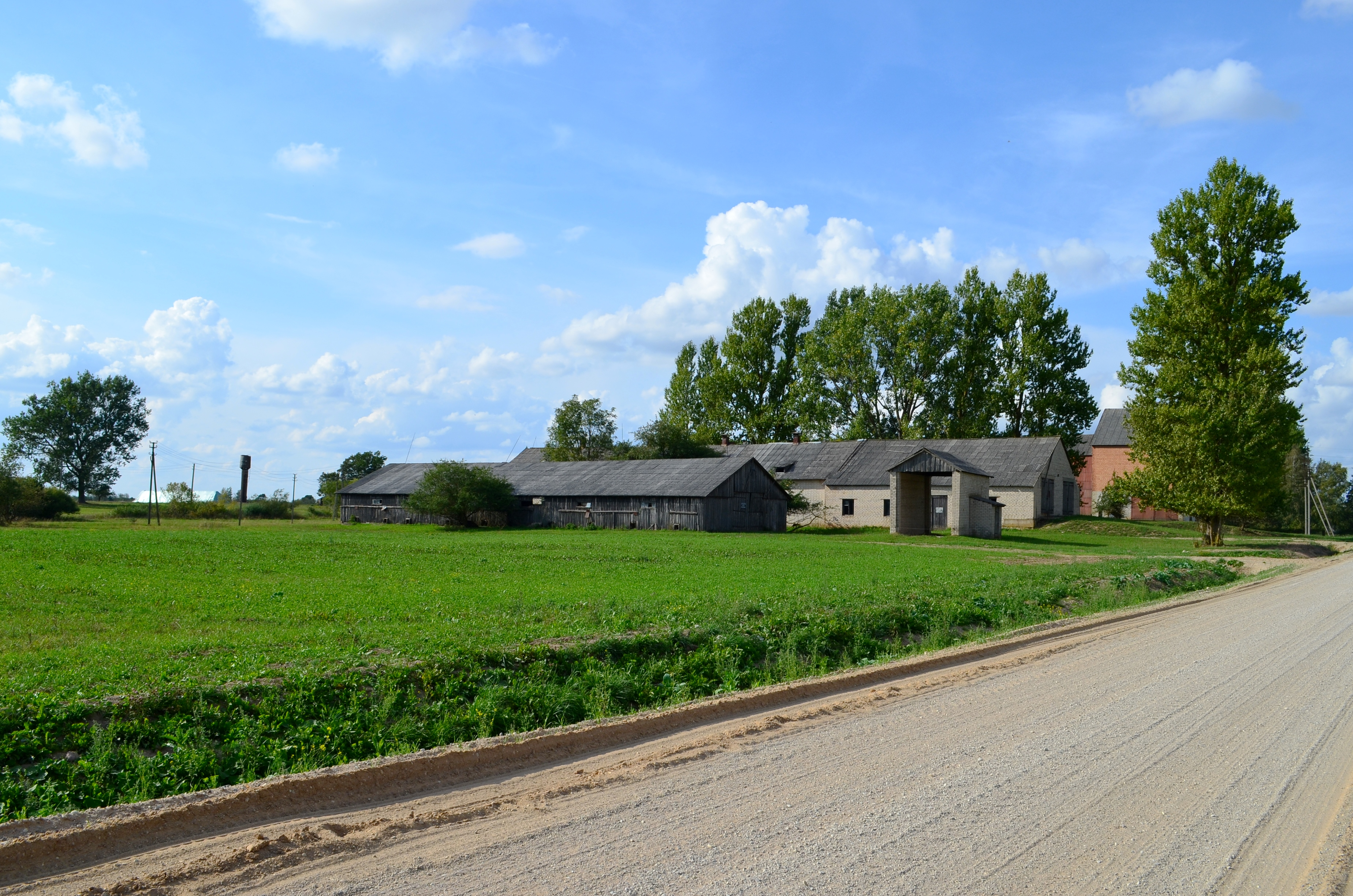

- Location in Lithuania Čystapolis (Lithuania)
- Coordinates: 55°28′19″N 23°40′08″E
- Country: Lithuania
- County: Kaunas County
- Municipality: Kėdainiai district municipality
- Eldership: Krakės Eldership

Population (2011)
  - Total: 16
- Time zone: UTC+2 (EET)
  - Summer (DST): UTC+3 (EEST)

Čystapolis (from Polish "Czystopole", 'clear field') is a village in Kėdainiai district municipality, in Kaunas County, in central Lithuania. According to the 2011 census, the village had a population of 16 people. It is located 7.5 kilometres (4.7 mi) from Krakės, 2 kilometres (1.2 mi) from Barkūniškis, on the left bank of the Šušvė river, by its tributary Vinkšnupis.

Historically, it was a folwark.

== Demography ==
Historical population

Year	Pop.	±% p.a.
1923	26	—
1959	51	+1.89%
1970	58	+1.18%
1979	46	−2.54%

Year	Pop.	±% p.a.
1989	31	−3.87%
2001	32	+0.26%
2011	16	−6.70%

Source: 1902, 1923, 1959 & 1970, 1979, 1989, 2001, 2011
