= Barkūniškis =

- Village
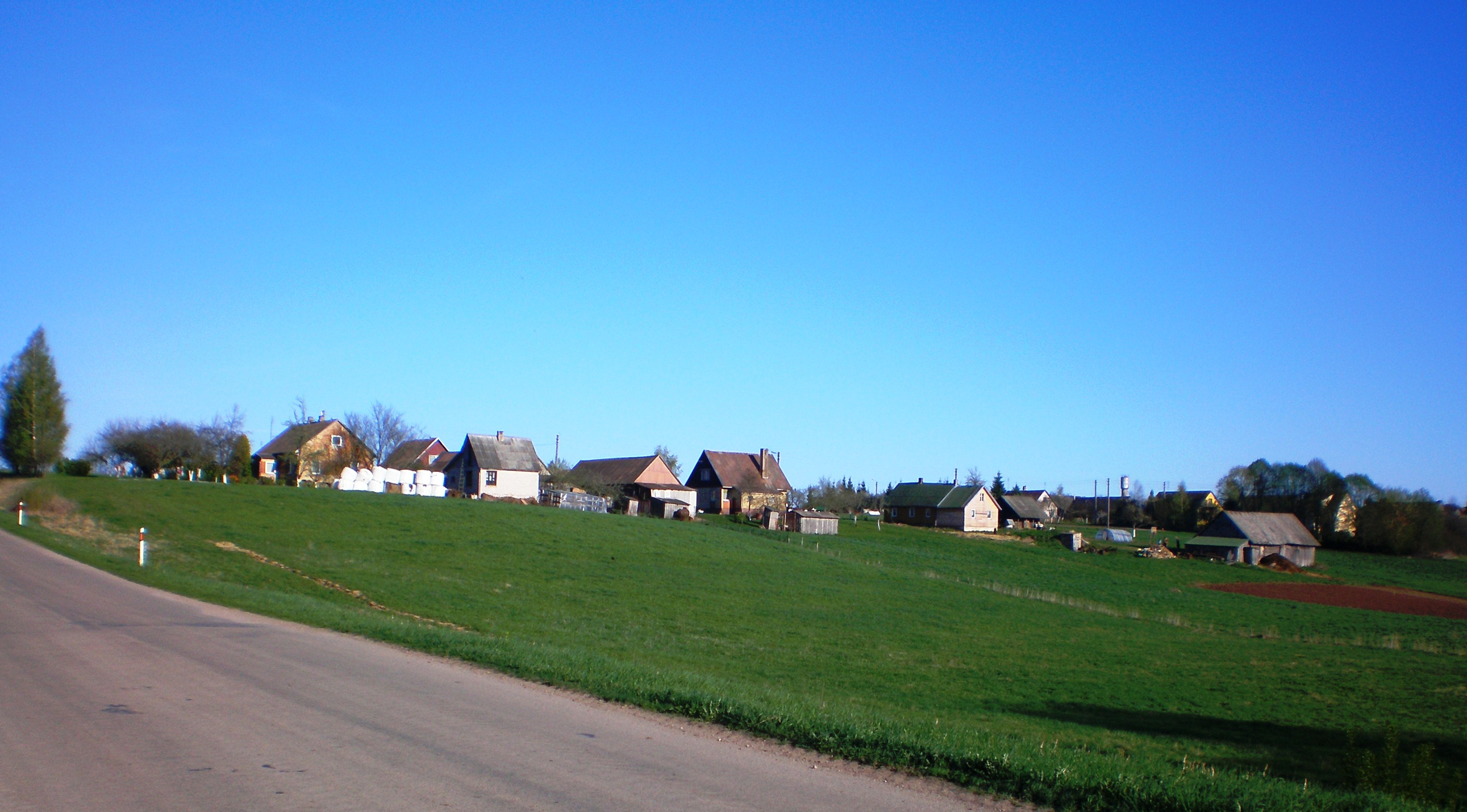

- Location in Lithuania Barkūniškis (Lithuania)
- Coordinates: 55°27′11″N 23°40′01″E
- Country: Lithuania
- County: Kaunas County
- Municipality: Kėdainiai district municipality
- Eldership: Krakės Eldership

Population (2011)
  - Total: 55
- Time zone: UTC+2 (EET)
  - Summer (DST): UTC+3 (EEST)

Barkūniškis (formerly Bartkūniškis, Polish: Bartkuniszki, Russian: Барткунишки) is a village in Kėdainiai district municipality, in Kaunas County, in central Lithuania. According to the 2011 census, the village had a population of 55 people. It is located 6.5 kilometres (4.0 mi) from Krakės, 2 kilometres (1.2 mi) from Ažytėnai, on the left bank of the Šušvė river. There is a former watermill, which was a part of Barkūniškis manor (it belonged to the Kušleikos, later to the Jacunskai families).

== Demography ==
Historical population

Year	Pop.	±% p.a.
1902	34	—
1923	74	+3.77%
1959	97	+0.75%
1970	101	+0.37%

Year	Pop.	±% p.a.
1979	59	−5.80%
1989	75	+2.43%
2001	106	+2.92%
2011	55	−6.35%

Source: 1902, 1923, 1959 & 1970, 1979, 1989, 2001, 2011

== Images ==
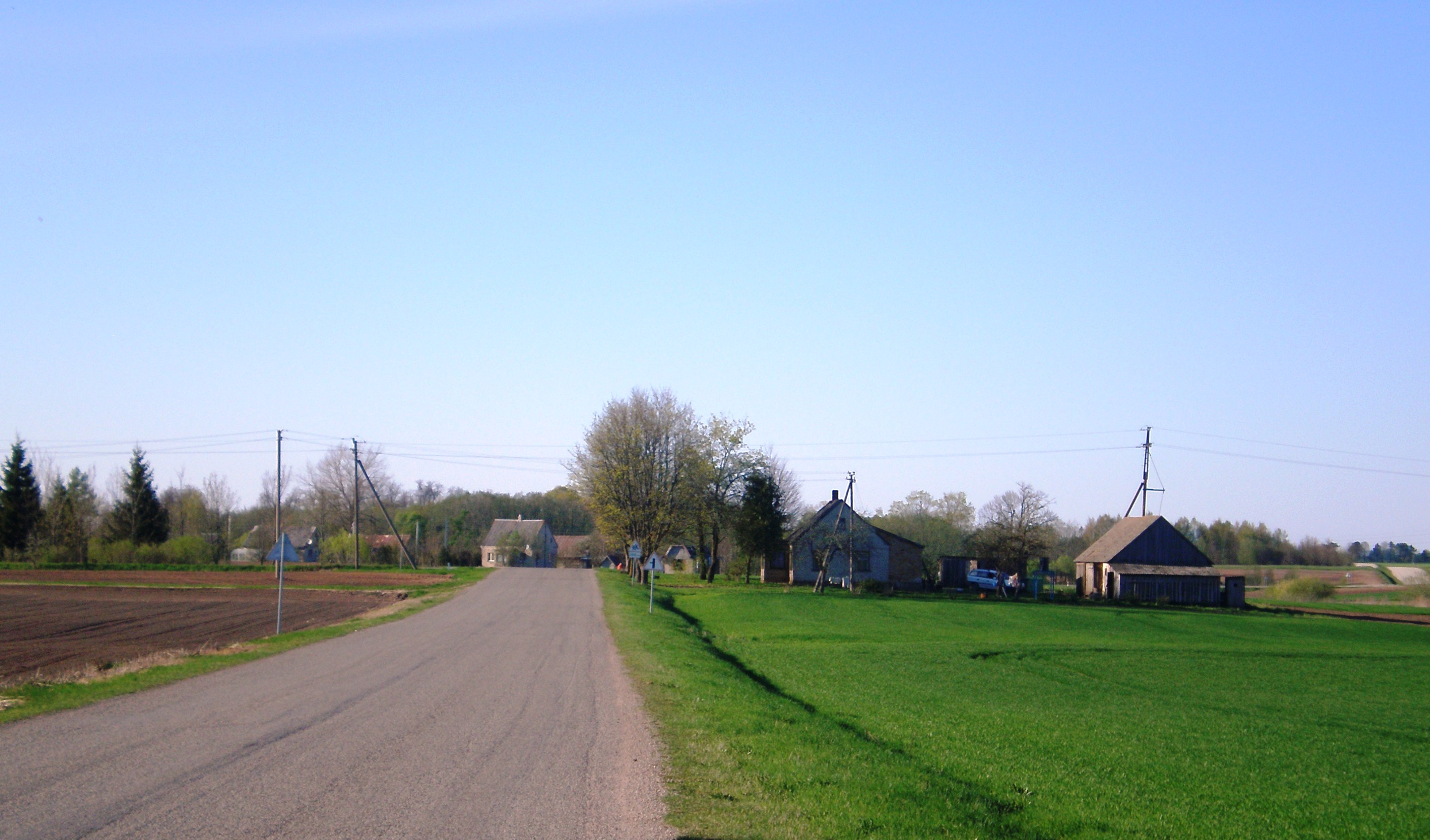
Barkūniškis from the Krakės side

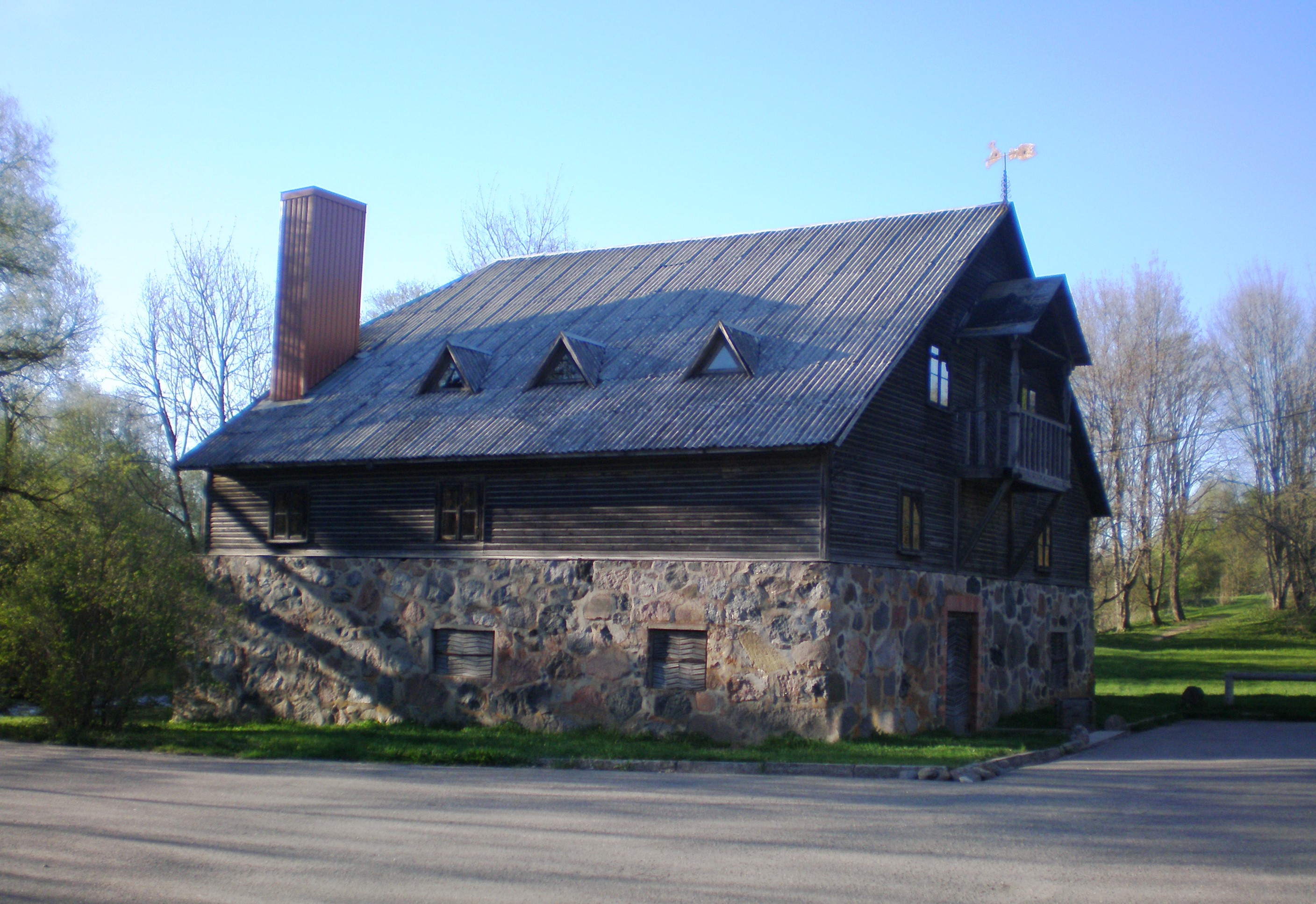
Former watermill

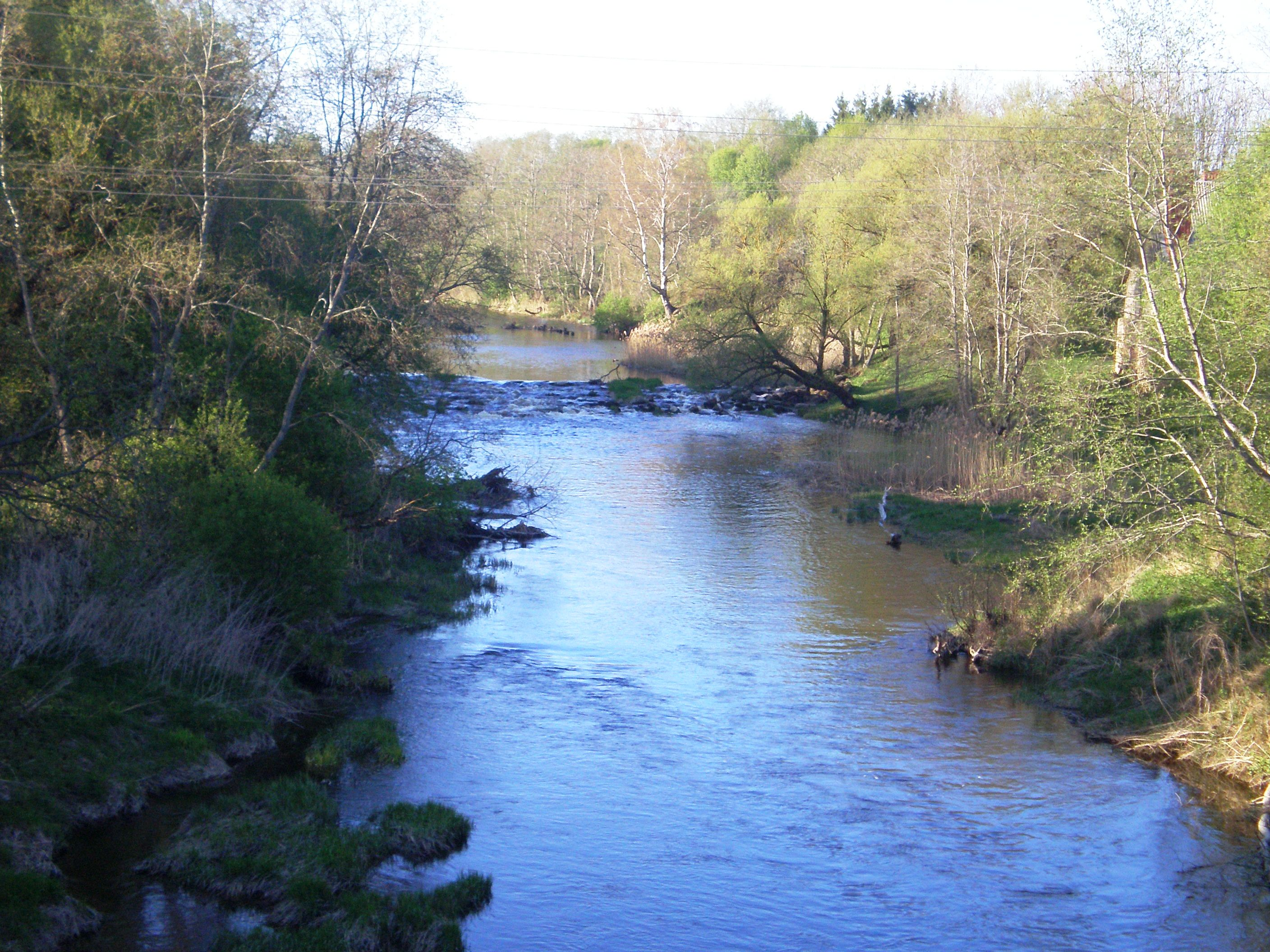
Šušvė in Bartkūniškis
