= Paskerdūmiukas =

- Village
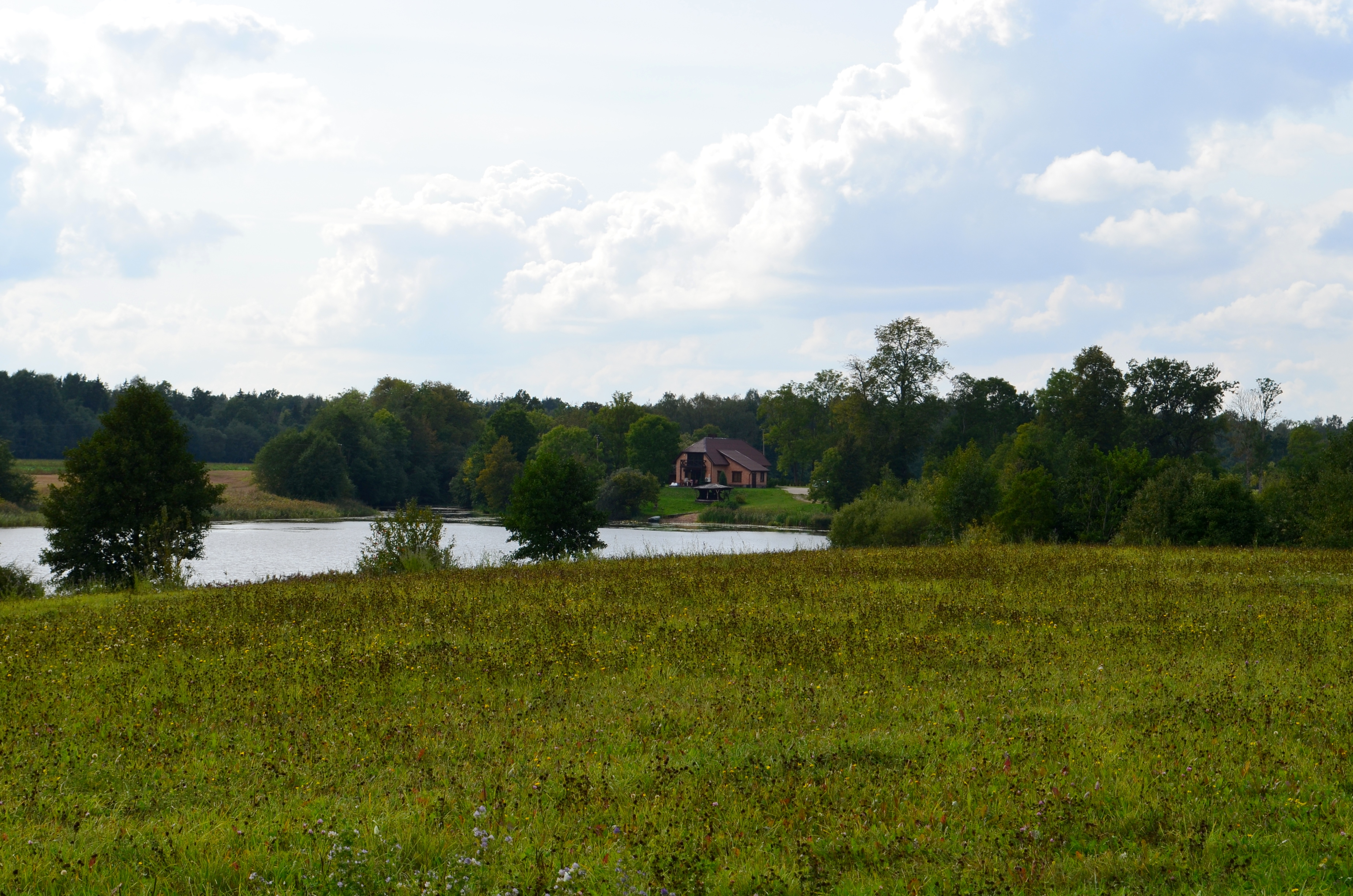

- Location in Lithuania Paskerdūmiukas (Lithuania)
- Coordinates: 55°25′30″N 23°36′29″E
- Country: Lithuania
- County: Kaunas County
- Municipality: Kėdainiai district municipality
- Eldership: Krakės Eldership

Population (2011)
  - Total: 0
- Time zone: UTC+2 (EET)
  - Summer (DST): UTC+3 (EEST)

Paskerdūmiukas (formerly Russian: Поскирдуми, Polish: Poskirdumie, Zacisze) is a village in Kėdainiai district municipality, in Kaunas County, in central Lithuania. According to the 2011 census, the village was uninhabited. It is located 3 kilometres (1.9 mi) from Pašušvys, by the Lapkalnys-Paliepiai Forest, on the shore of the Skerdūmė Pond.

At the beginning of the 20th century there was one of two Paskerdūmys manors (known as Zacišė), a property of the Tyszkiewicz family.

== Demography ==
Historical population

Year	Pop.	±% p.a.
1902	18	—
1923	21	+0.74%
1959	10	−2.04%
1970	13	+2.41%

Year	Pop.	±% p.a.
1979	6	−8.23%
1989	2	−10.40%
2001	6	+9.59%
2011	0	−100.00%

Source: 1902, 1923, 1959 & 1970, 1979, 1989, 2001, 2011
