= Paskerdūmys =

- Village
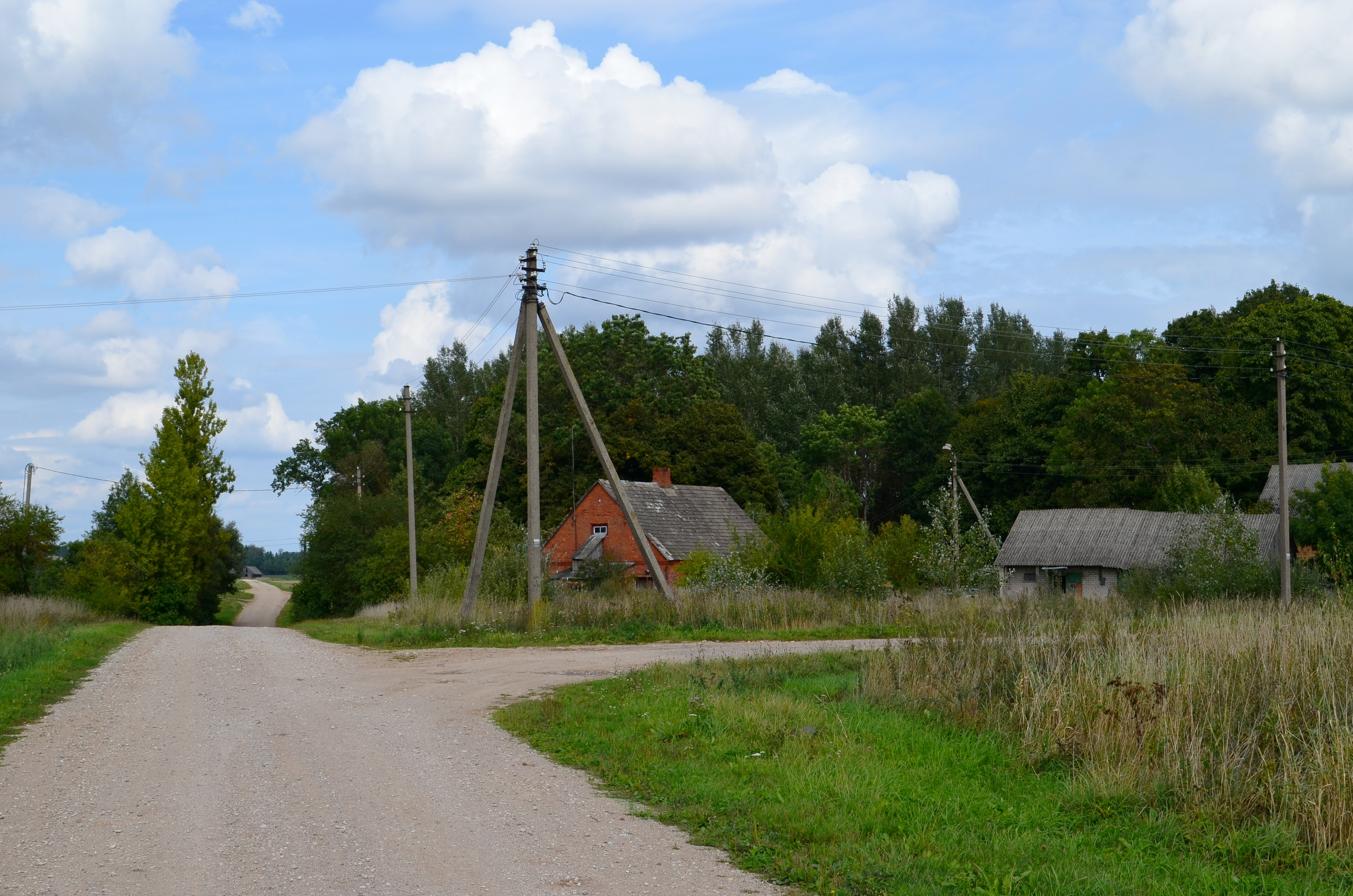

- Location in Lithuania Paskerdūmys (Lithuania)
- Coordinates: 55°25′08″N 23°37′41″E
- Country: Lithuania
- County: Kaunas County
- Municipality: Kėdainiai district municipality
- Eldership: Krakės Eldership

Population (2011)
  - Total: 5
- Time zone: UTC+2 (EET)
  - Summer (DST): UTC+3 (EEST)

Paskerdūmys (formerly Russian: Поскирдуми, Polish: Poskirdumie) is a village in Kėdainiai district municipality, in Kaunas County, in central Lithuania. According to the 2011 census, the village had a population of 5 people. It is located 1 kilometre (0.62 mi) from Pašušvys, by the Skerdūmė river and the Skerdūmė Pond. There is a farm.

== History ==
At the beginning of the 20th century there were two Paskerdūmys estates. One of them (current Paskerdūmys) was a property of the Jelenskiai, and the other was known as Zacišė (now Paskerdūmiukas).

== Demography ==
Historical population

Year	Pop.	±% p.a.
1902	31	—
1923	49	+2.20%
1959	52	+0.17%
1970	33	−4.05%

Year	Pop.	±% p.a.
1979	22	−4.41%
1989	12	−5.88%
2001	13	+0.67%
2011	5	−9.11%

Source: 1902, 1923, 1959 & 1970, 1979, 1989, 2001, 2011

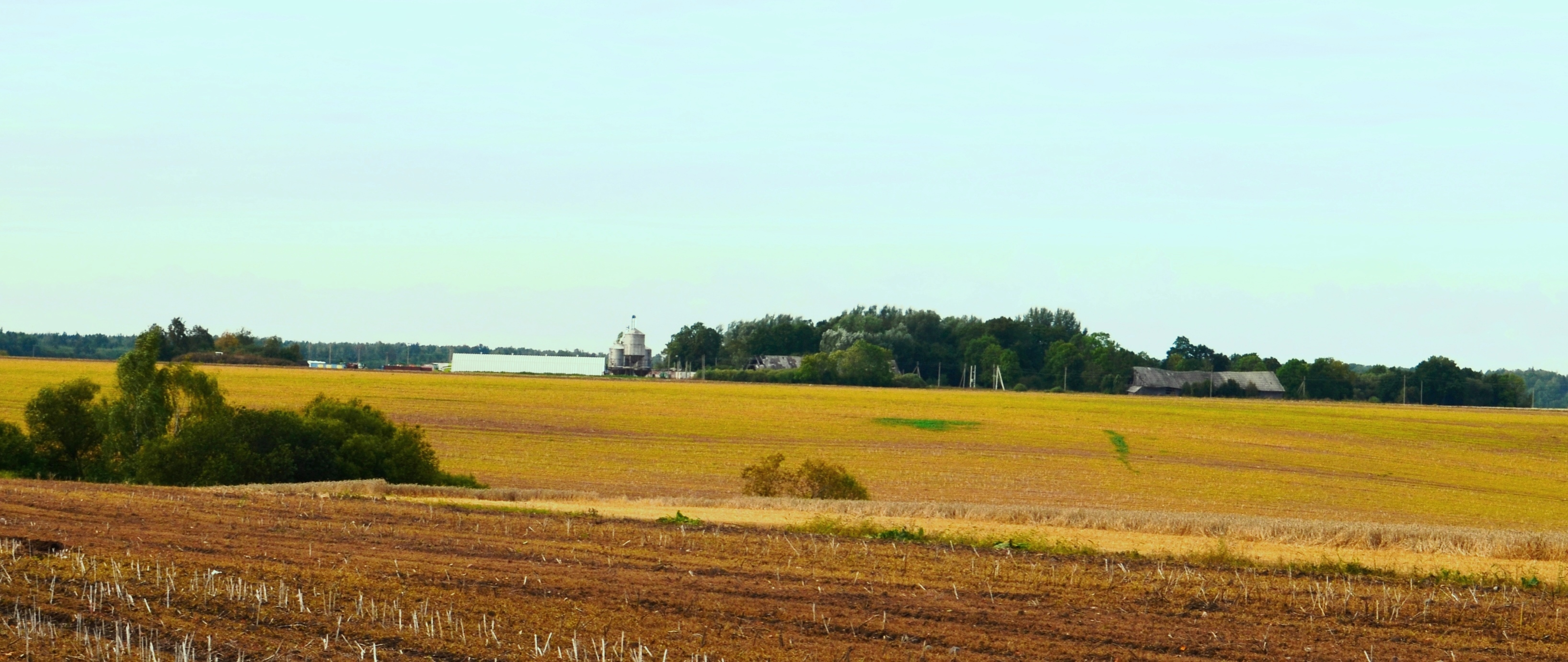
Paskerdūmys from the southeast
