= Graužiai =

Graužiai could refer to several Lithuanian villages:

- Graužiai, Gudžiūnai, in Gudžiūnai Eldership of Kėdainiai District Municipality
- Graužiai, Josvainiai, in Josvainiai Eldership of Kėdainiai District Municipality
- Graužiai, Kunioniai, a smaller village nearby Kunioniai in Josvainiai Eldership of Kėdainiai District Municipality
- Graužiai, Širvintos, in Širvintos District Municipality.

== See also ==
- Graužai
