= Mikališkiai, Kėdainiai =

Mikališkiai
- Village
- Location in Lithuania Mikališkiai (Lithuania)
- Coordinates: 55°13′10″N 23°48′35″E
- Country: Lithuania
- County: Kaunas County
- Municipality: Kėdainiai district municipality
- Eldership: Josvainiai Eldership

Population (2011)
  - Total: 0
- Time zone: UTC+2 (EET)
  - Summer (DST): UTC+3 (EEST)

Mikališkiai (formerly Russian: Михалишки, Polish: Michaliszki) is a village in Kėdainiai district municipality, in Kaunas County, in central Lithuania. According to the 2011 census, the village was uninhabited. It is located 4 kilometres (2.5 mi) from Josvainiai, by the Vikšrupis river.

== Demography ==
Historical population

| Year | Pop. | ±% p.a. |
|---|---|---|
| 1902 | 19 | — |
| 1959 | 8 | −1.51% |
| 1970 | 7 | −1.21% |
| 1979 | 0 | −100.00% |

| Year | Pop. | ±% p.a. |
|---|---|---|
| 1989 | 0 | 0.00% |
| 2001 | 0 | 0.00% |
| 2011 | 0 | 0.00% |

Source: 1902, 1923, 1959 & 1970, 1979, 1989, 2001, 2011
