= Bajėnai II =

- Village
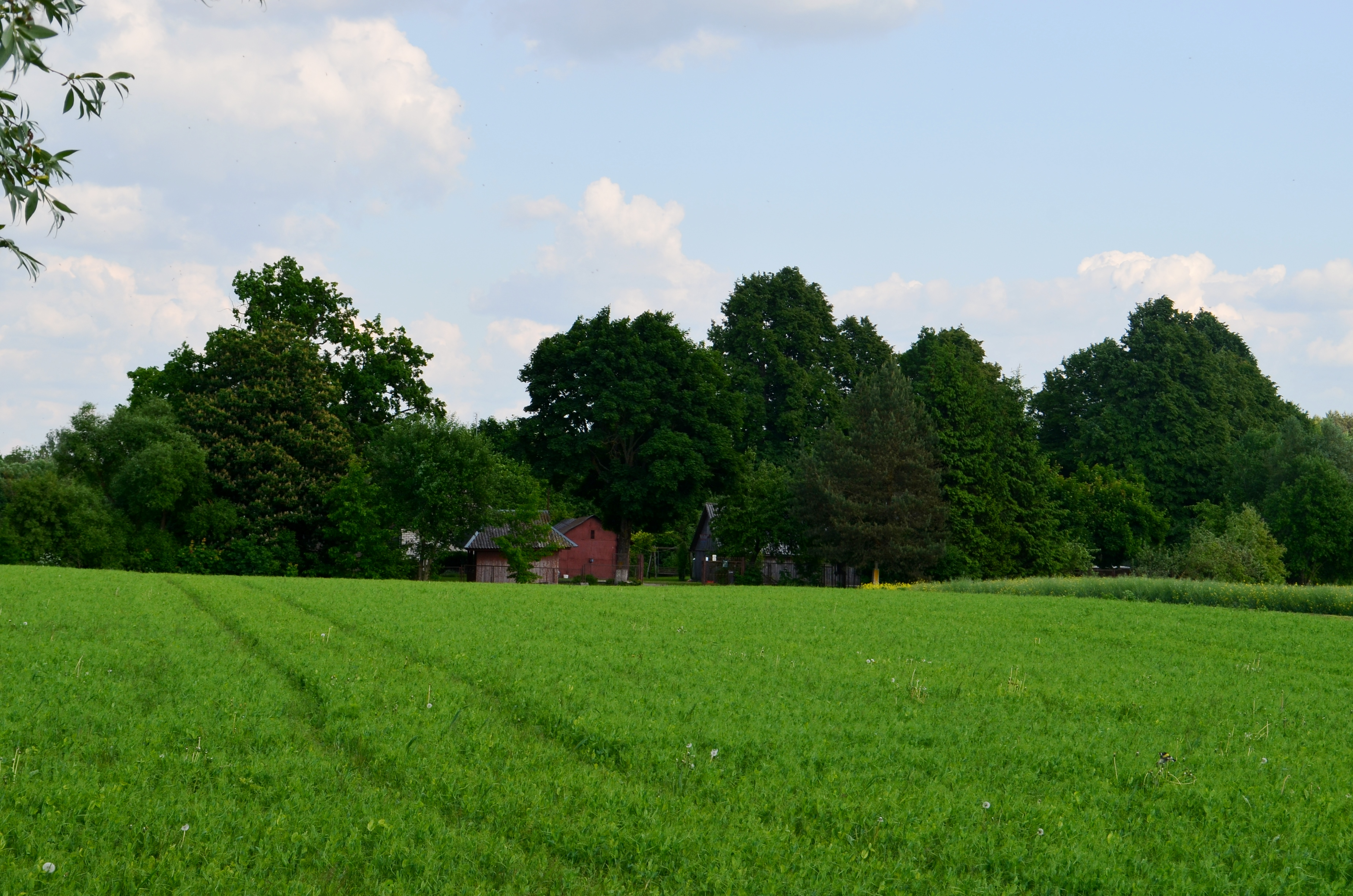

- Location in Lithuania Bajėnai II (Lithuania)
- Coordinates: 55°10′19″N 23°49′08″E
- Country: Lithuania
- County: Kaunas County
- Municipality: Kėdainiai district municipality
- Eldership: Josvainiai Eldership

Population (2011)
  - Total: 14
- Time zone: UTC+2 (EET)
  - Summer (DST): UTC+3 (EEST)

Bajėnai II (Bajėnai 2nd, formerly Russian: Бояны, Polish: Bojany) is a village in Kėdainiai district municipality, in Kaunas County, in central Lithuania. According to the 2011 census, the village had a population of 14 people. It is located 1.5 kilometres (0.93 mi) from Kampai I, on the right bank of the Nevėžis river, near the mouth of the Šušvė. The village limits with the Šušvė Landscape Sanctuary. There is a cemetery.

== History ==
At the 19th century there was a folwark, a property of the Tyszkiewicz family manor in Bajėnai I.

== Demography ==
Historical population

Year	Pop.	±% p.a.
1902	121	—
1959	175	+0.65%
1970	44	−11.80%
1979	25	−6.09%

Year	Pop.	±% p.a.
1989	11	−7.88%
2001	11	+0.00%
2011	14	+2.44%

Source: 1902, 1923, 1959 & 1970, 1979, 1989, 2001, 2011

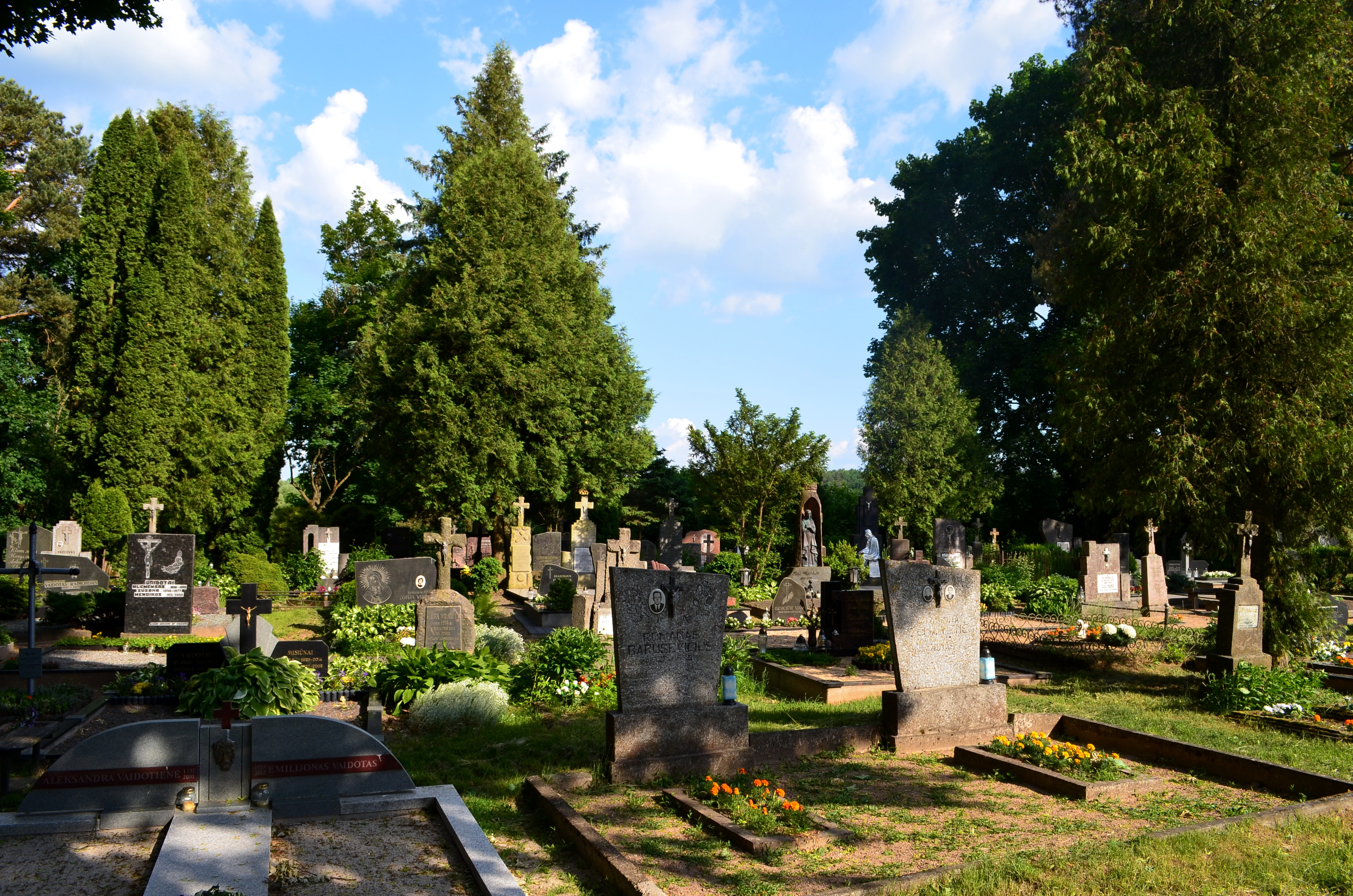
Bajėnai cemetery
