= Degimai, Josvainiai =

Degimai
- Village
- Location in Lithuania Degimai (Lithuania)
- Coordinates: 55°13′40″N 23°46′20″E
- Country: Lithuania
- County: Kaunas County
- Municipality: Kėdainiai district municipality
- Eldership: Josvainiai Eldership

Population (2011)
  - Total: 0
- Time zone: UTC+2 (EET)
  - Summer (DST): UTC+3 (EEST)

Degimai ('burnt places', formerly Russian: Дегимы, Дягимас) is a village in Kėdainiai district municipality, in Kaunas County, in central Lithuania. According to the 2011 census, the village was uninhabited. It is located 4 kilometres (2.5 mi) from Kunioniai, in the midst of the Pernarava-Šaravai Forest, nearby the Vikšrupis river.

== Demography ==
Historical population

Year	Pop.	±% p.a.
1902	26	—
1923	11	−4.01%
1959	17	+1.22%
1970	2	−17.68%

Year	Pop.	±% p.a.
1979	1	−7.41%
1989	0	−100.00%
2001	1	—
2011	0	−100.00%

Source: 1902, 1923, 1959 & 1970, 1979, 1989, 2001, 2011
