= Josvainiai Eldership =

Josvainiai Eldership Josvainių seniūnija
- Eldership
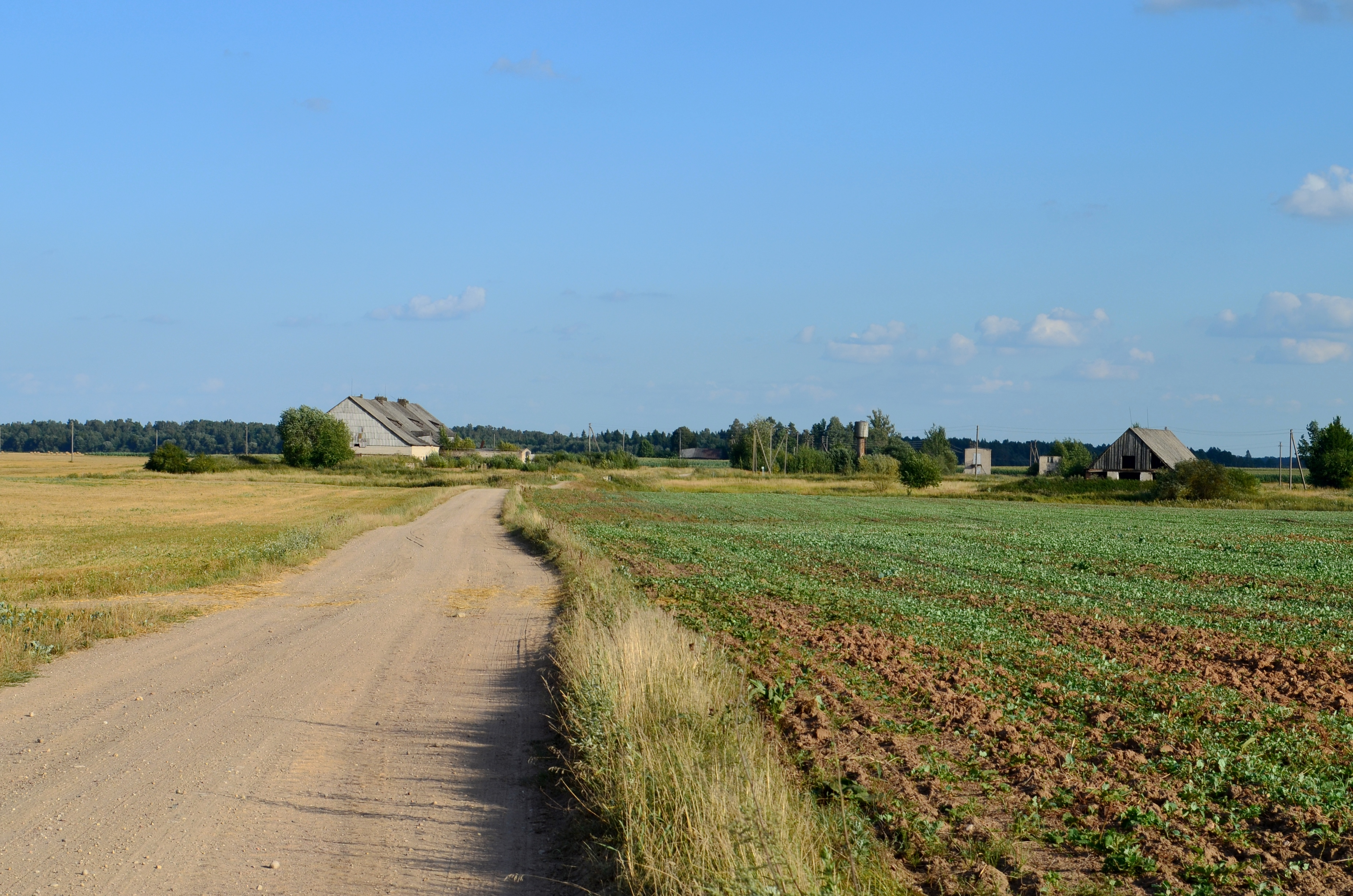
- Ruseiniai landscapes

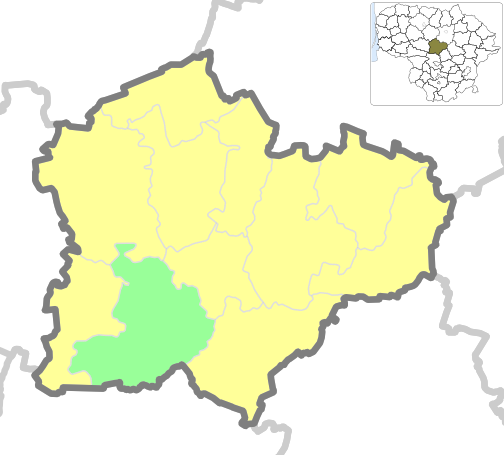
- Location of Josvainiai Eldership
- Country: Lithuania
- Ethnographic region: Aukštaitija
- County: Kaunas County
- Municipality: Kėdainiai District Municipality
- Administrative centre: Josvainiai

Area
  - Total: 185 km^{2} (71 sq mi)

Population (2011)
  - Total: 3,018
  - Density: 16.3/km^{2} (42.3/sq mi)
- Time zone: UTC+2 (EET)
  - Summer (DST): UTC+3 (EEST)

Josvainiai Eldership (Lithuanian: Josvainių seniūnija) is a Lithuanian eldership, located in the southern part of Kėdainiai District Municipality.

Eldership was created from the Josvainiai selsovet in 1993.

== Geography ==
The territory of Josvainiai Eldership is located mostly in the Nevėžis Plain, but the western edges are in the East Samogitian Plateau. Relief is mostly flat, 2/3 of the territory is agriculture lands, about 1/3 is covered by forests.

- Rivers: Nevėžis (with Upytė), Šušvė with its tributaries (Liedas, Putnupys, Vikšrupis), Smilgaitis, Aluona.
- Lakes and ponds: Bedugnė Lake, Angiriai Reservoir.
- Forests: Pernarava-Šaravai Forest, Josvainiai Forest.
- Protected areas: Šušvė Landscape Sanctuary, Laučynė Landscape Sanctuary, Aluona Hydrographical Sanctuary, Pavikšrupys Botanical Zoological Sanctuary, Šušvė Geomorphological Sanctuary, Dotnuva-Josvainiai Forest Biosphere Polygon.
- Nature monuments: Šaravai Oak Tree

== Places of interest ==
- Catholic church of All Saints in Josvainiai, wooden Catholic church of the Sacred Heart of Jesus in Šaravai
- Ancient burial places in Čiukiškiai, Ruseiniai, Graužiai and Sviliai
- Former manor site in Sviliukai
- Jasnagurka Manor barn
- Josvainiai Jewish cemetery

== Populated places ==
Following settlements are located in the Josvainiai Eldership (as for 2011 census):

- Towns: Josvainiai
- Villages: Angiriai · Bajėnai I · Bajėnai II · Barsukynė · Būdai · Būdviečiai · Čiukiškiai · Daubarai · Degimai · Gailiakaimis · Galulaukiai · Grašva · Graužiai · Graužiai · Ivaniškiai · Jasnagurka · Josvainiai · Juodkaimiai · Kampai I · Kampai II · Karūnava · Kilbisai · Kunioniai · Macgaliai · Maleikoniai · Mikališkiai · Paaluonė · Paliepiai · Paliepiukai · Pavikšrupys · Pažiedupys · Plaktiniai · Ruseinėliai · Ruseiniai · Skaistgiriai · Sviliai · Sviliukai · Šaravai · Šingaliai · Vainikai · Varnupė · Vincentava
- Hamlets: Antanava · Pasmilgys · Prapuoleniai
