= Liedas =

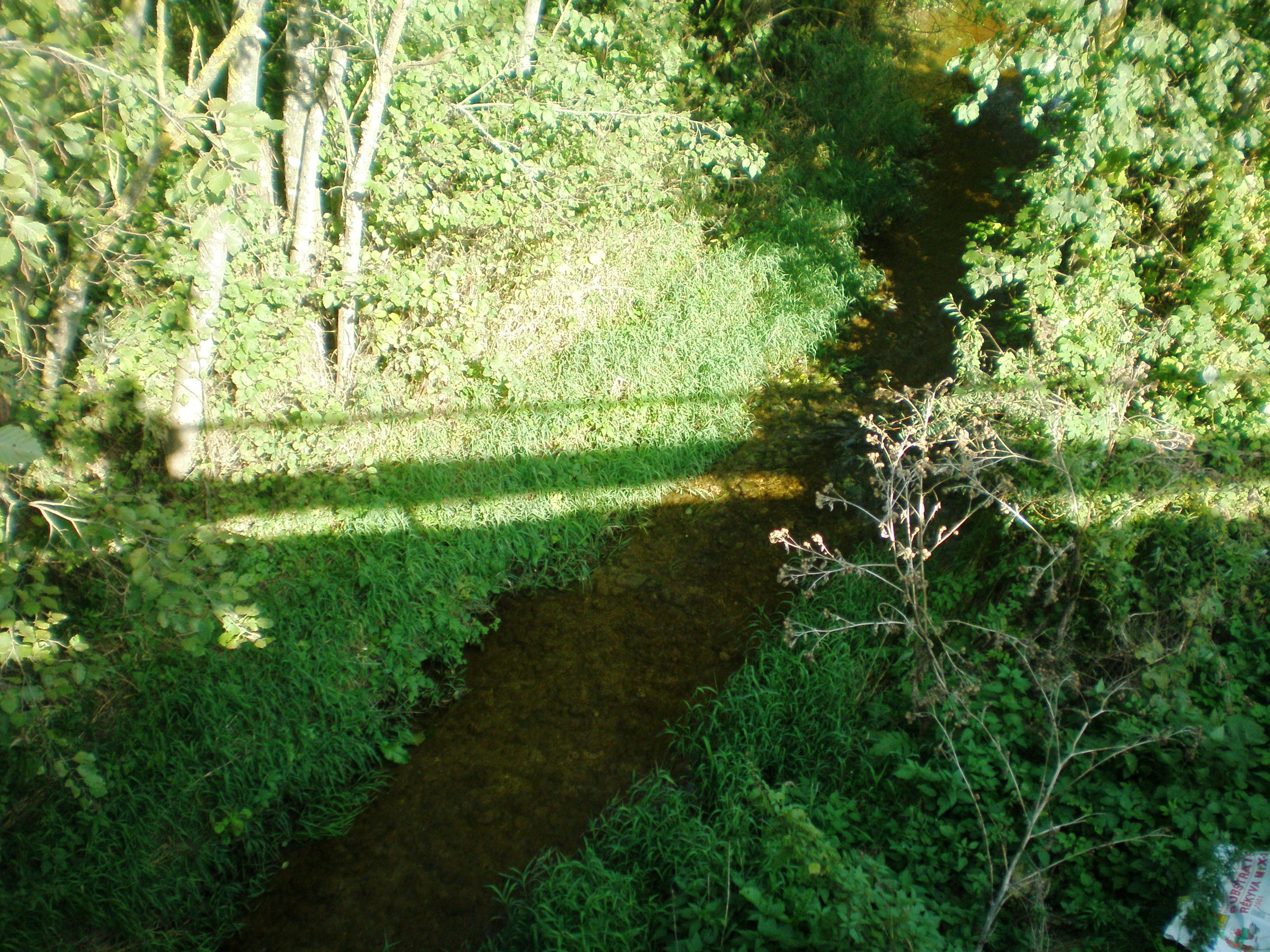
- Liedas lower course nearby Juodkaimiai

Location
- Country: Lithuania
- Region: Kėdainiai district municipality, Kaunas County

Physical characteristics
- Source
  - location: Nearby Pelutava
- Mouth: Šušvė in Juodkaimiai
  - coordinates: 55.2518°N 23.8213°E
- Length: 17.7 km (11.0 mi)
- Basin size: 31.5 km^{2} (12.2 sq mi)

Basin features
- Progression: Šušvė→ Nevėžis→ Neman→ Baltic Sea
- Tributaries
  - left: Sąsvila

The Liedas (or Leda) is a river of Kėdainiai district municipality, Kaunas County, central Lithuania. It flows for 17.7 kilometres and has a basin area of 31.5 km².

It starts nearby Pelutava village and later flows through the Pernarava-Šaravai Forest. It meets the Šušvė from the right side near Juodkaimiai village.

The hydronym Liedas possibly derives from Lithuanian verbs liedyti, lieti ('to water').
