= Ivaniškiai, Josvainiai =

Ivaniškiai
- Village
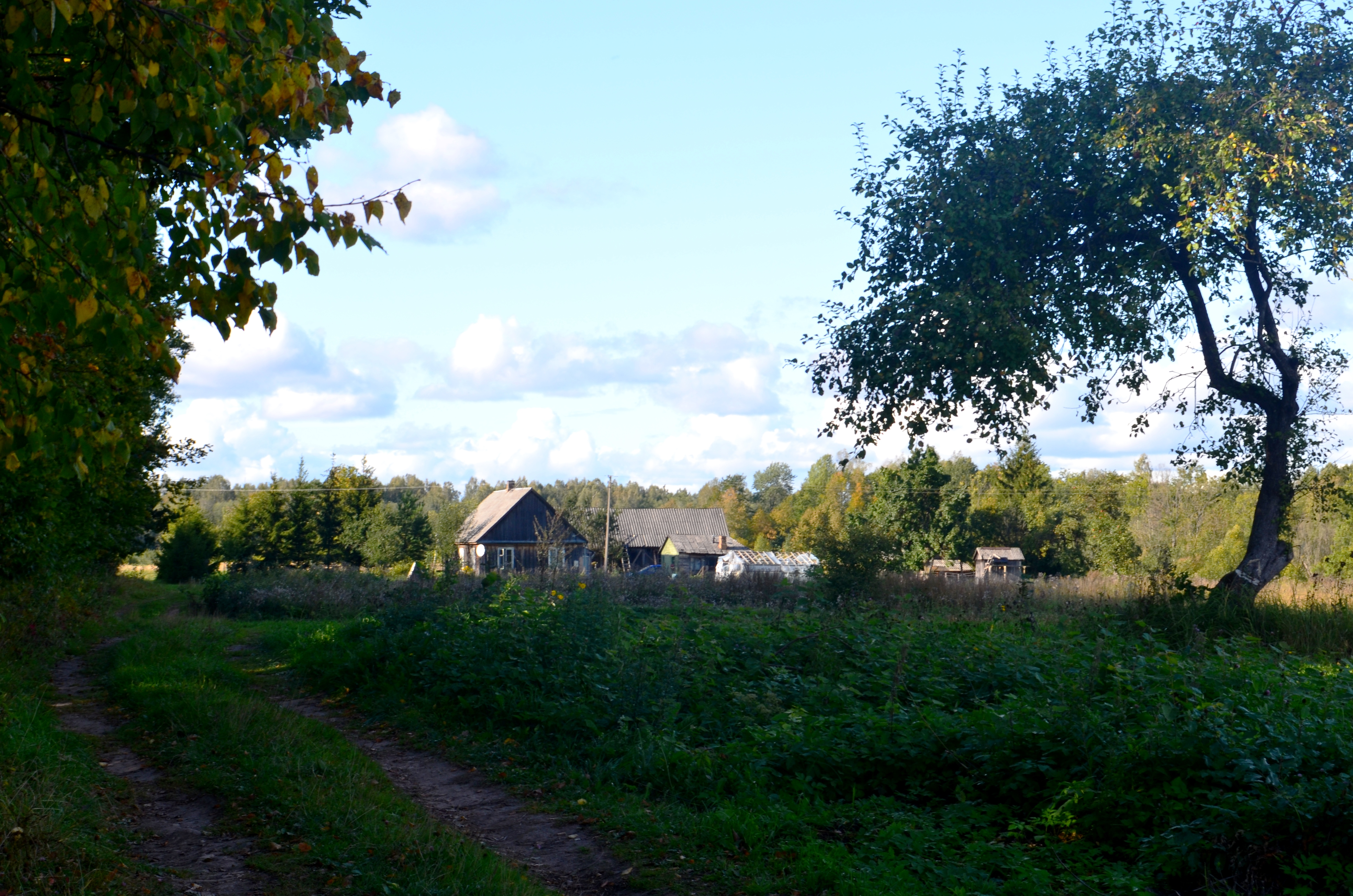

- Location in Lithuania Ivaniškiai (Lithuania)
- Coordinates: 55°09′50″N 23°42′50″E
- Country: Lithuania
- County: Kaunas County
- Municipality: Kėdainiai district municipality
- Eldership: Josvainiai Eldership

Population (2011)
  - Total: 0
- Time zone: UTC+2 (EET)
  - Summer (DST): UTC+3 (EEST)

Ivaniškiai (formerly Janogradas, Russian: Иванишки, Яногрод, Polish: Janogród) is a village in Kėdainiai district municipality, in Kaunas County, in central Lithuania. According to the 2011 census, the village was uninhabited. It is located 3.5 kilometres (2.2 mi) from Skaistgiriai, in the Pernarava-Šaravai Forest, by the Aluona river and the Aluona Hydrographical Sanctuary.

At the beginning of the 20th century there was Janogradas village and estate, a property of the Wiszniewski family.

== Demography ==
Historical population

Year	Pop.	±% p.a.
1902	11	—
1923	47	+7.16%
1959	16	−2.95%
1970	11	−3.35%

Year	Pop.	±% p.a.
1979	8	−3.48%
1989	3	−9.34%
2001	10	+10.55%
2011	0	−100.00%

Source: 1902, 1923, 1959 & 1970, 1979, 1989, 2001, 2011
