= Laučynė Landscape Sanctuary =

Protected area in central Lithuania

- IUCN category VI (protected area with sustainable use of natural resources)
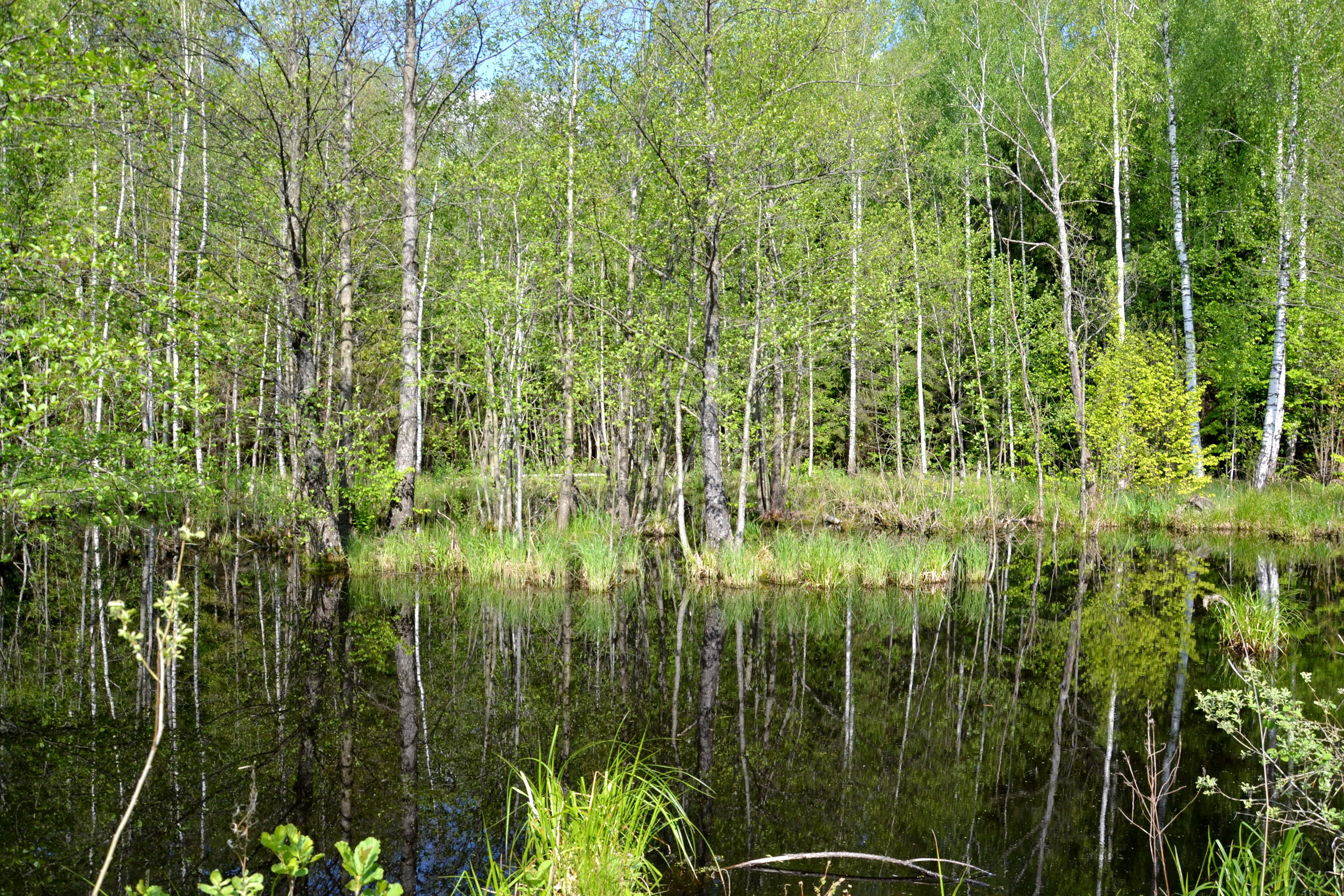
- Laučynė Landscape Sanctuary swamps

- Location within Lithuania Location within Kėdainiai District Municipality
- Location: Josvainiai Eldership, Kėdainiai District Municipality, Lithuania
- Nearest town: Josvainiai
- Coordinates: 55°10′29″N 23°41′05″E
- Area: 3.55 km^{2} (1.37 sq mi)
- Established: 1992
- Governing body: Lithuanian Service of Protected Areas

The Laučynė Landscape Sanctuary (Lithuanian: Laučynės kraštovaizdžio draustinis) is a protected area of a state importance in Josvainiai Eldership of Kėdainiai District Municipality, in central Lithuania. It was established in 1992 and covers an area of 3.55 square kilometres (1.37 sq mi). It encompasses a part of the Pernarava-Šaravai Forest with the Žvaranta river.

The aim of the sanctuary is to protect a typical landscape of the Nevėžis Plain covered by forest. Mixed forests predominate in the sanctuary, with small-leaved lime and hornbeam tree groups. Rare wild garlic and common ivy grow in the forest. There are crane nesting places.

The Šaravai Oak Tree (a nature monument) grows in the Laučynė Landscape Sanctuary.
