= Būdviečiai, Kėdainiai =

Būdviečiai
- Village
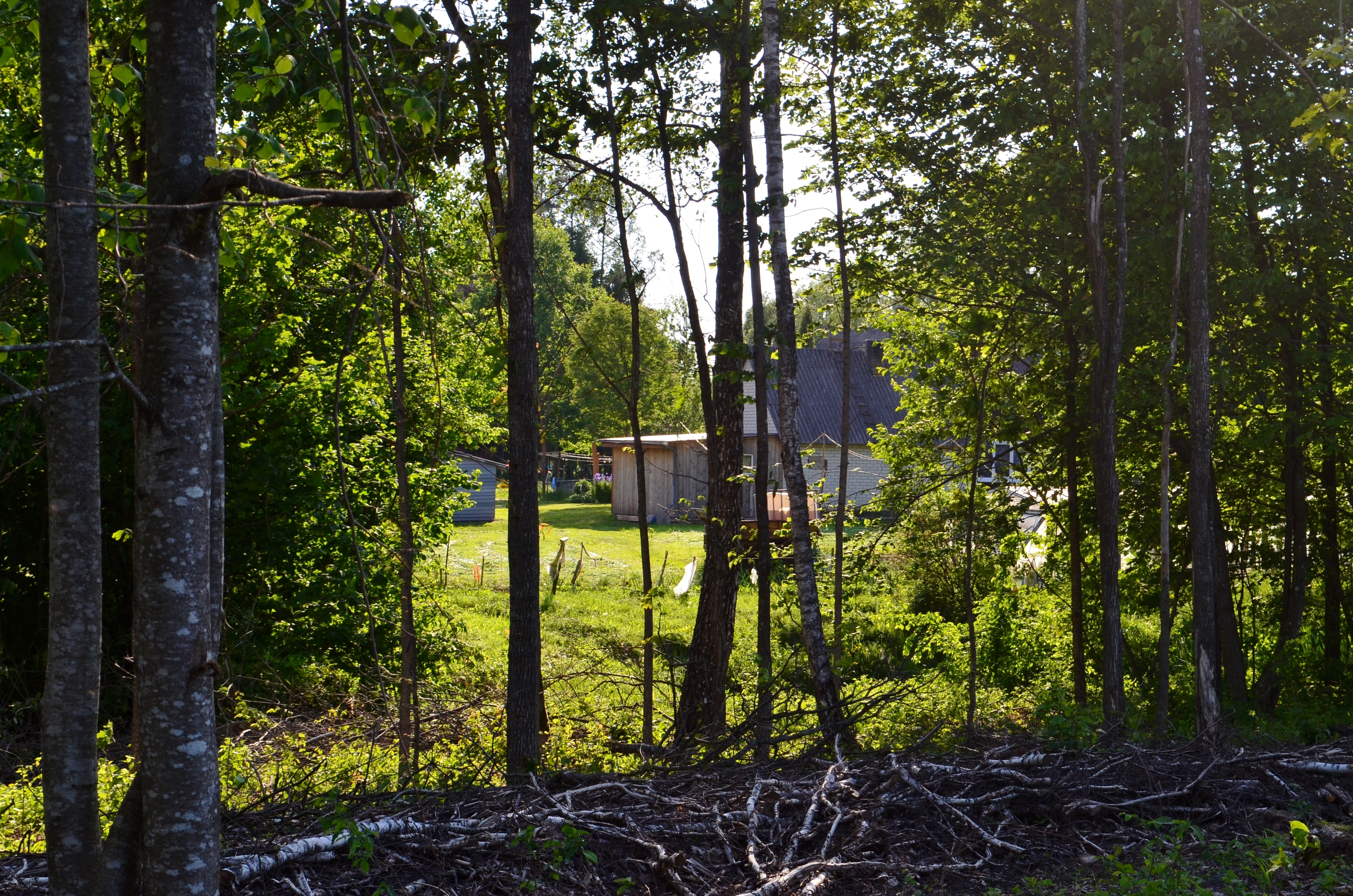

- Location in Lithuania Būdviečiai (Lithuania)
- Coordinates: 55°09′50″N 23°43′41″E
- Country: Lithuania
- County: Kaunas County
- Municipality: Kėdainiai district municipality
- Eldership: Josvainiai Eldership

Population (2011)
  - Total: 6
- Time zone: UTC+2 (EET)
  - Summer (DST): UTC+3 (EEST)

Būdviečiai ('sawmill place') is a village in Kėdainiai district municipality, in Kaunas County, in central Lithuania. According to the 2011 census, the village had a population of 6 people. It is located 4 kilometres (2.5 mi) from Skaistgiriai, by the Aluona river, inside the Bajėnai Forest. It is inside the Aluona Hydrographical Sanctuary.

== Demography ==
Historical population

Year	Pop.	±% p.a.
1923	14	—
1959	13	−0.21%
1970	9	−3.29%
1979	26	+12.51%

Year	Pop.	±% p.a.
1989	6	−13.64%
2001	7	+1.29%
2011	6	−1.53%

Source: 1902, 1923, 1959 & 1970, 1979, 1989, 2001, 2011
