= Graužiai, Josvainiai =

Graužiai
- Village
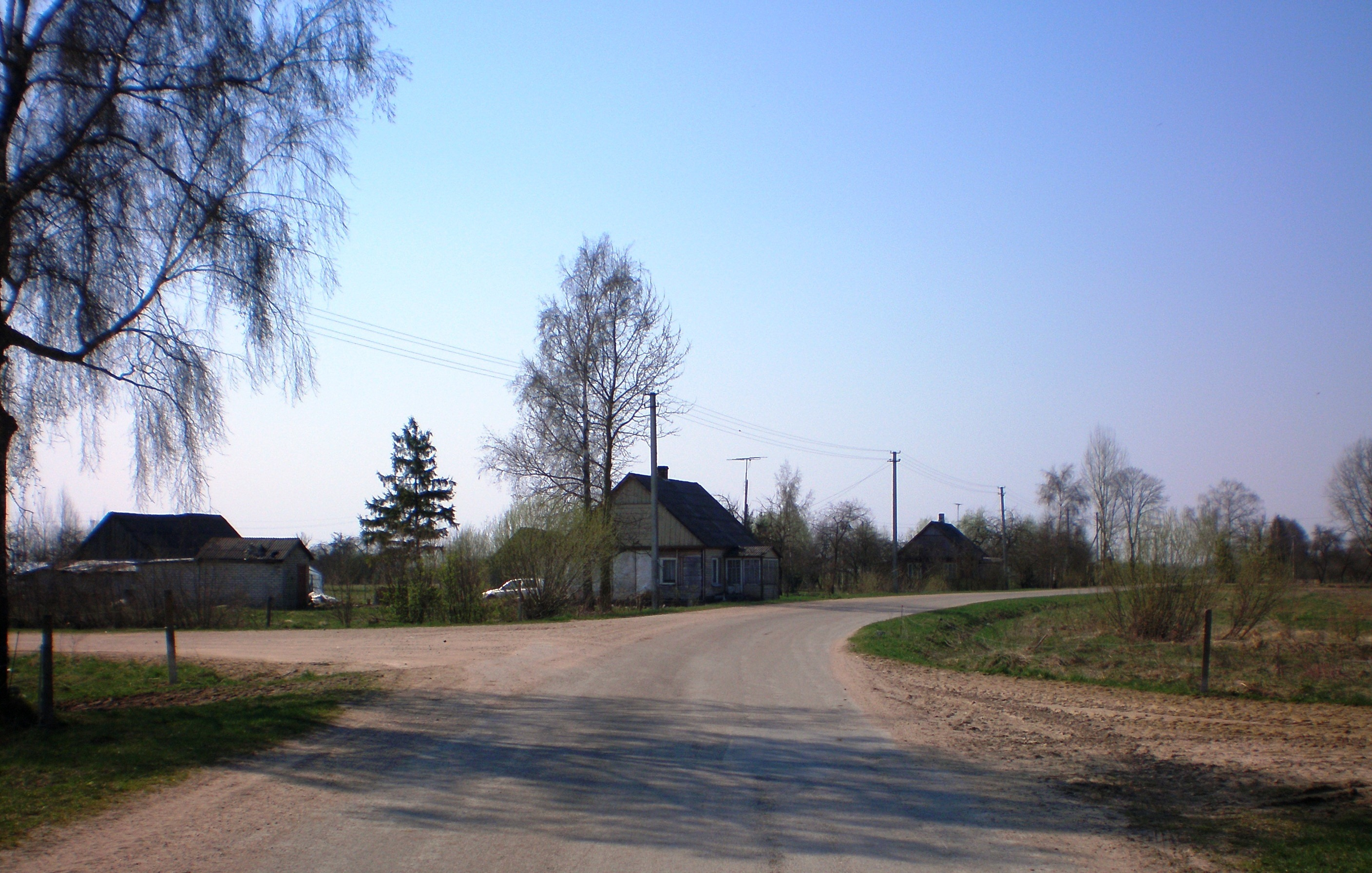

- Location in Lithuania Graužiai (Lithuania)
- Coordinates: 55°12′22″N 23°52′01″E
- Country: Lithuania
- County: Kaunas County
- Municipality: Kėdainiai district municipality
- Eldership: Josvainiai Eldership

Population (2011)
  - Total: 24
- Time zone: UTC+2 (EET)
  - Summer (DST): UTC+3 (EEST)

Graužiai (formerly Russian: Граужи, Polish: Grauże) is a village in Kėdainiai district municipality, in Kaunas County, in central Lithuania. According to the 2011 census, the village had a population of 24 people. It is located 2 kilometres (1.2 mi) from Kunioniai, by the Šušvė river and the Šušvė Landscape Sanctuary. The road Šingaliai-Paliepiai crosses the village.

There is an ancient burial place near Graužiai and the Graužiai Treasure has been found in the village in 1939.

== Demography ==
Historical population

Year	Pop.	±% p.a.
1923	358	—
1959	221	−1.33%
1970	213	−0.33%
1979	80	−10.31%

Year	Pop.	±% p.a.
1989	44	−5.80%
2001	61	+2.76%
2011	24	−8.91%

Source: 1902, 1923, 1959 & 1970, 1979, 1989, 2001, 2011
