= Kilbisai =

- Village
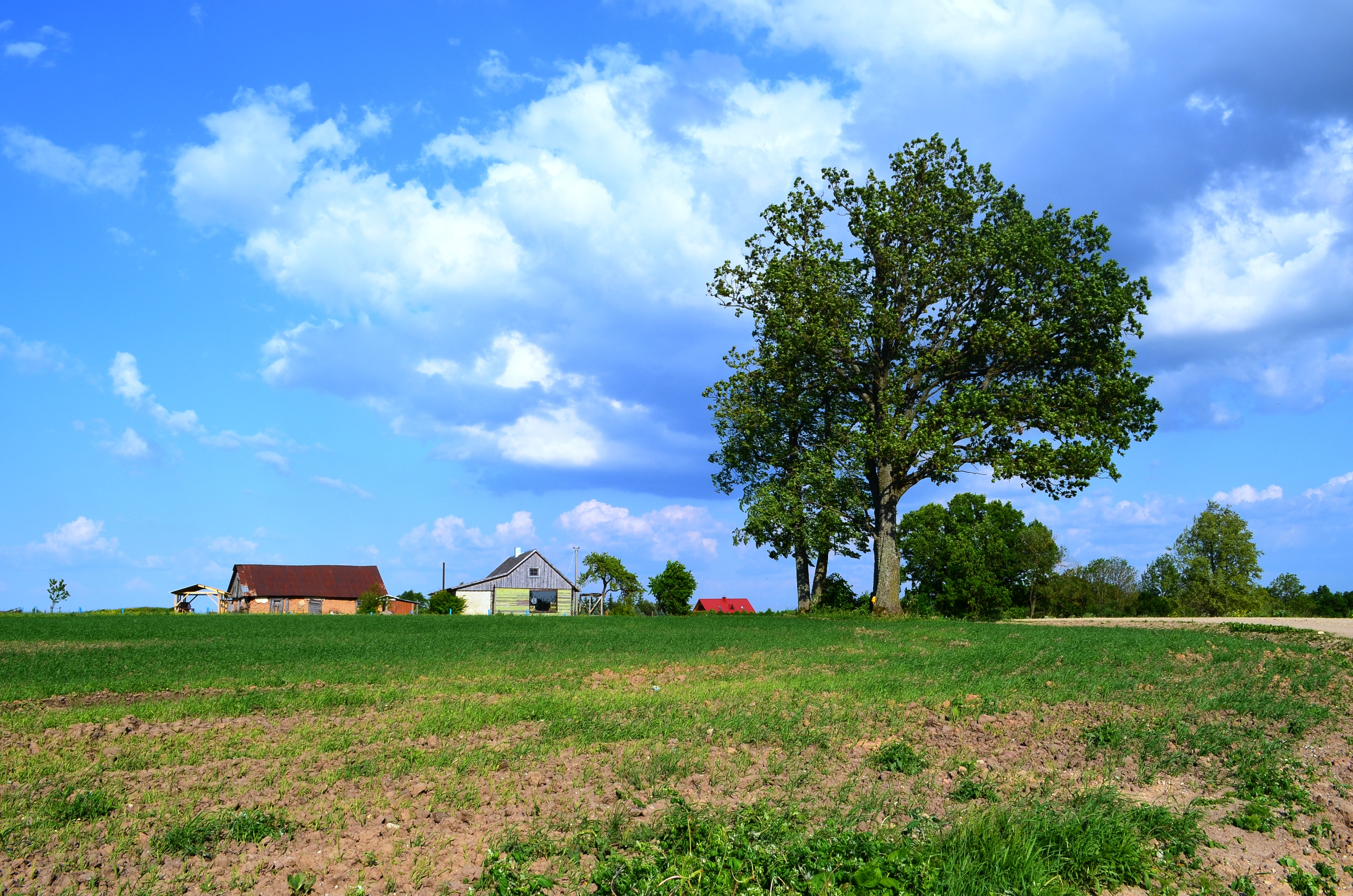

- Location in Lithuania Kilbisai (Lithuania)
- Coordinates: 55°09′50″N 23°47′31″E
- Country: Lithuania
- County: Kaunas County
- Municipality: Kėdainiai district municipality
- Eldership: Josvainiai Eldership

Population (2011)
  - Total: 7
- Time zone: UTC+2 (EET)
  - Summer (DST): UTC+3 (EEST)

Kilbisai (formerly Russian: Кильбисы, Polish: Kilbisy) is a village in Kėdainiai district municipality, in Kaunas County, in central Lithuania. According to the 2011 census, the village had a population of 7 people. It is located 2.5 kilometres (1.6 mi) from Kampai II, on the left bank of the Aluona river, next to the Aluona Hydrographical Sanctuary.

== Demography ==
Historical population

| Year | Pop. | ±% p.a. |
|---|---|---|
| 1902 | 154 | — |
| 1923 | 127 | −0.91% |
| 1959 | 85 | −1.11% |
| 1970 | 49 | −4.88% |

| Year | Pop. | ±% p.a. |
|---|---|---|
| 1979 | 22 | −8.51% |
| 1989 | 4 | −15.67% |
| 2001 | 9 | +6.99% |
| 2011 | 7 | −2.48% |

Source: 1902, 1923, 1959 & 1970, 1979, 1989, 2001, 2011

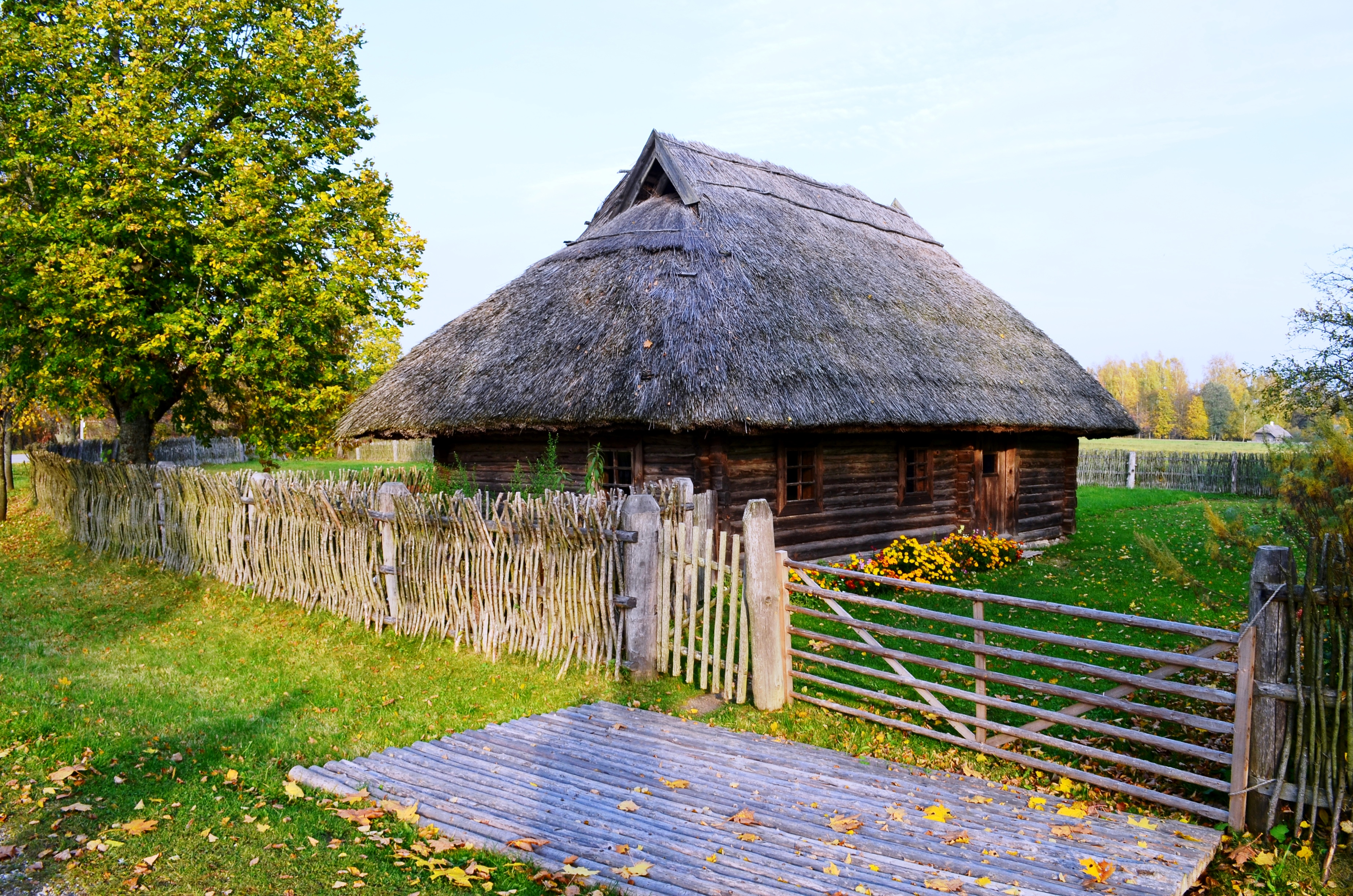
Aukštaitian gryčia from Kilbisai in the Lithuanian Museum of the Folk Life
