= Ruseinėliai =

- Village
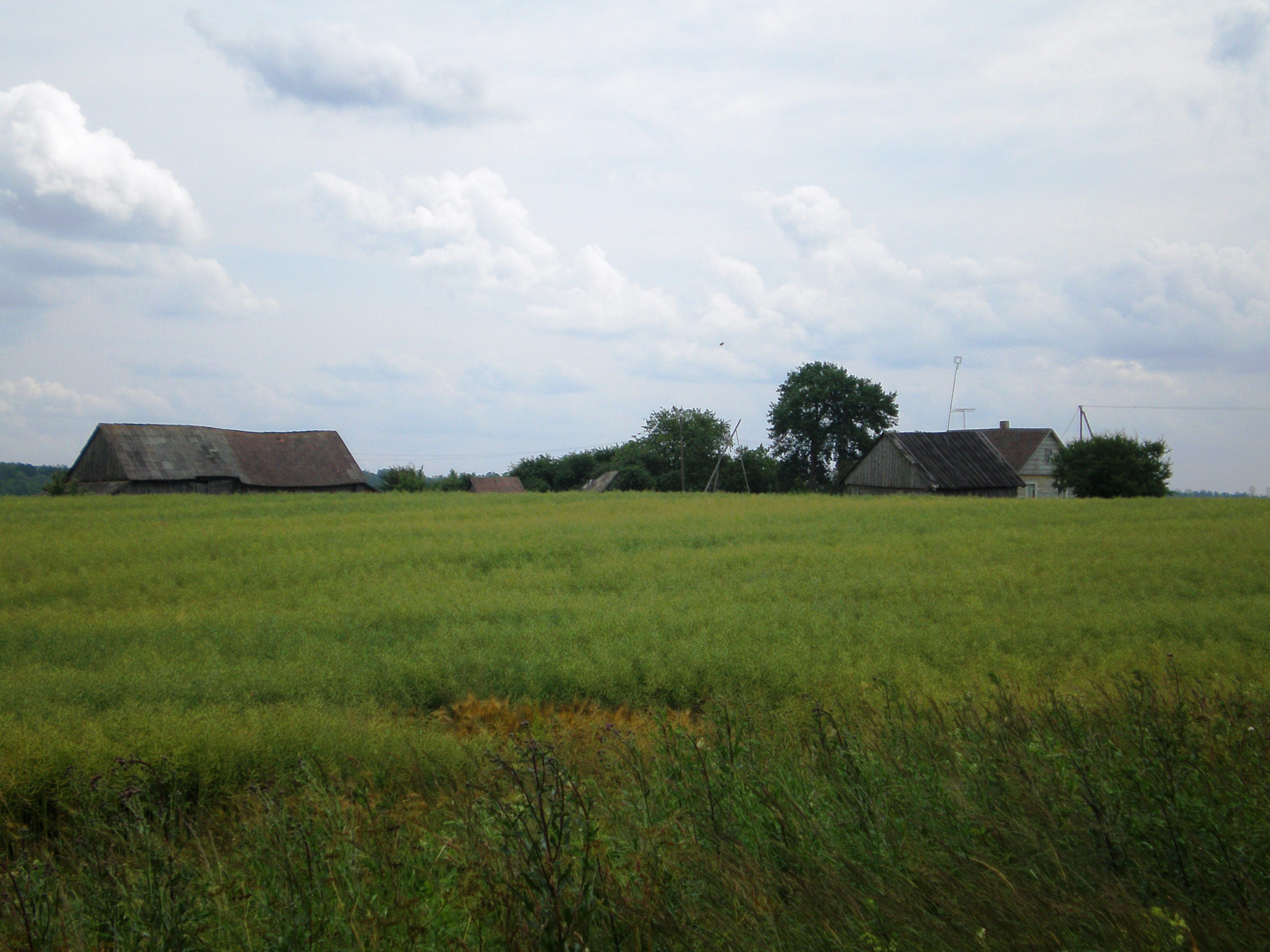

- Location in Lithuania Ruseinėliai (Lithuania)
- Coordinates: 55°19′41″N 23°45′22″E
- Country: Lithuania
- County: Kaunas County
- Municipality: Kėdainiai district municipality
- Eldership: Josvainiai Eldership

Population (2011)
  - Total: 0
- Time zone: UTC+2 (EET)
  - Summer (DST): UTC+3 (EEST)

Ruseinėliai is a village in Kėdainiai district municipality, in Kaunas County, in central Lithuania. According to the 2011 census, the village was uninhabited. It is located 3 kilometres (1.9 mi) from Pilsupiai, by the Smilgaitis river, nearby the Josvainiai Forest.

== Demography ==
Historical population

Year	Pop.	±% p.a.
1959	71	—
1970	44	−4.26%
1979	10	−15.18%

Year	Pop.	±% p.a.
1989	0	−100.00%
2001	0	0.00%
2011	0	0.00%

Source: 1902, 1923, 1959 & 1970, 1979, 1989, 2001, 2011
