= Varnupė =

- Village
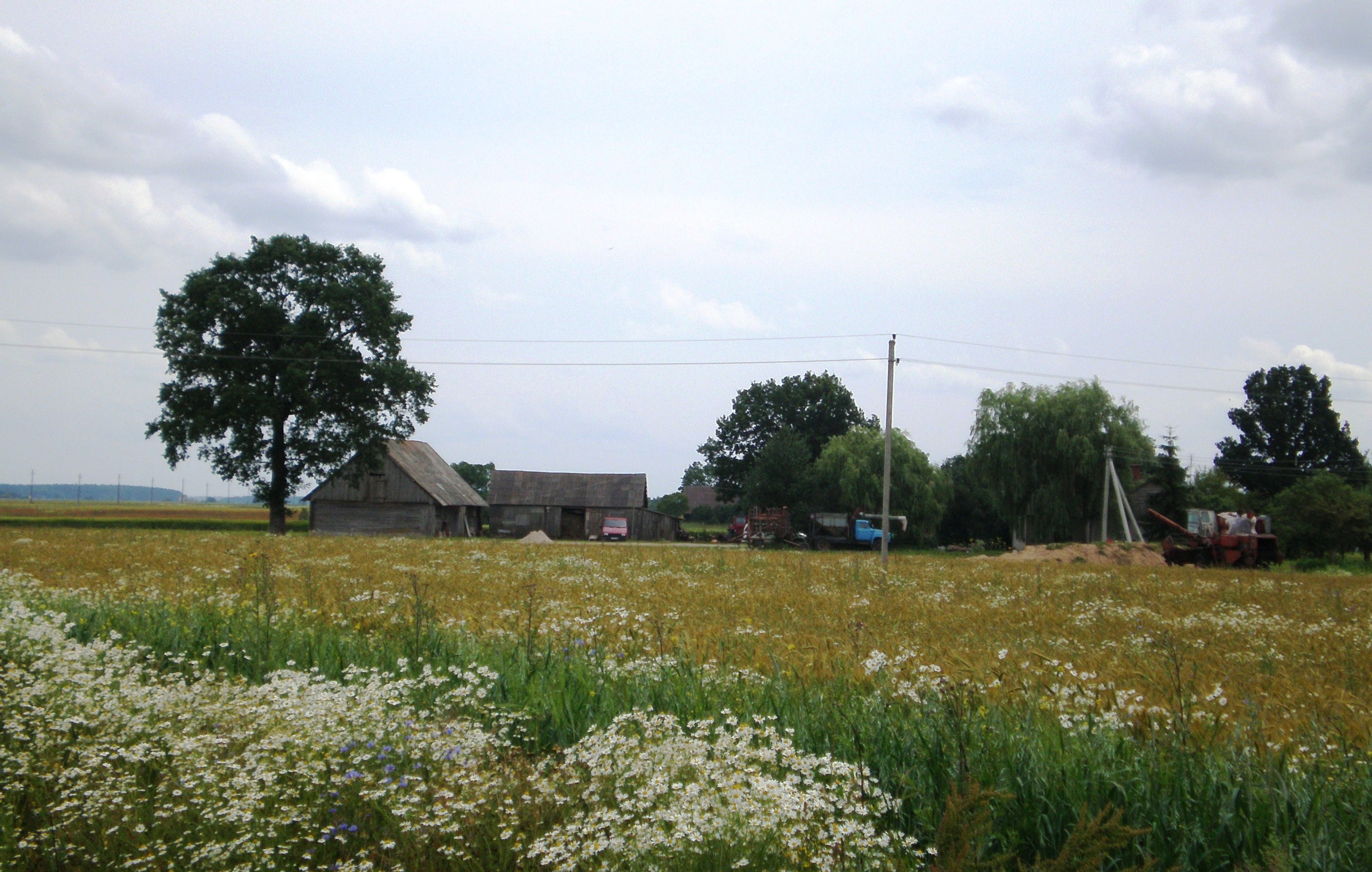

- Location in Lithuania Varnupė (Lithuania)
- Coordinates: 55°16′52″N 23°46′52″E
- Country: Lithuania
- County: Kaunas County
- Municipality: Kėdainiai district municipality
- Eldership: Josvainiai Eldership

Population (2011)
  - Total: 11
- Time zone: UTC+2 (EET)
  - Summer (DST): UTC+3 (EEST)

Varnupė ('crow-river', formerly Russian: Варнуписъ, Polish: Warnupka) is a village in Kėdainiai district municipality, in Kaunas County, in central Lithuania. According to the 2011 census, the village had a population of 11 people. It is located 4 kilometres (2.5 mi) from Josvainiai, on the left bank of the Šušvė river. The Josvainiai Forest is located nearby.

== Demography ==
Historical population

Year	Pop.	±% p.a.
1902	25	—
1923	25	+0.00%
1959	41	+1.38%
1970	12	−10.57%

Year	Pop.	±% p.a.
1979	11	−0.96%
1989	4	−9.62%
2001	10	+7.93%
2011	11	+0.96%

Source: 1902, 1923, 1959 & 1970, 1979, 1989, 2001, 2011
