= Daubarai, Kėdainiai =

Daubarai
- Village
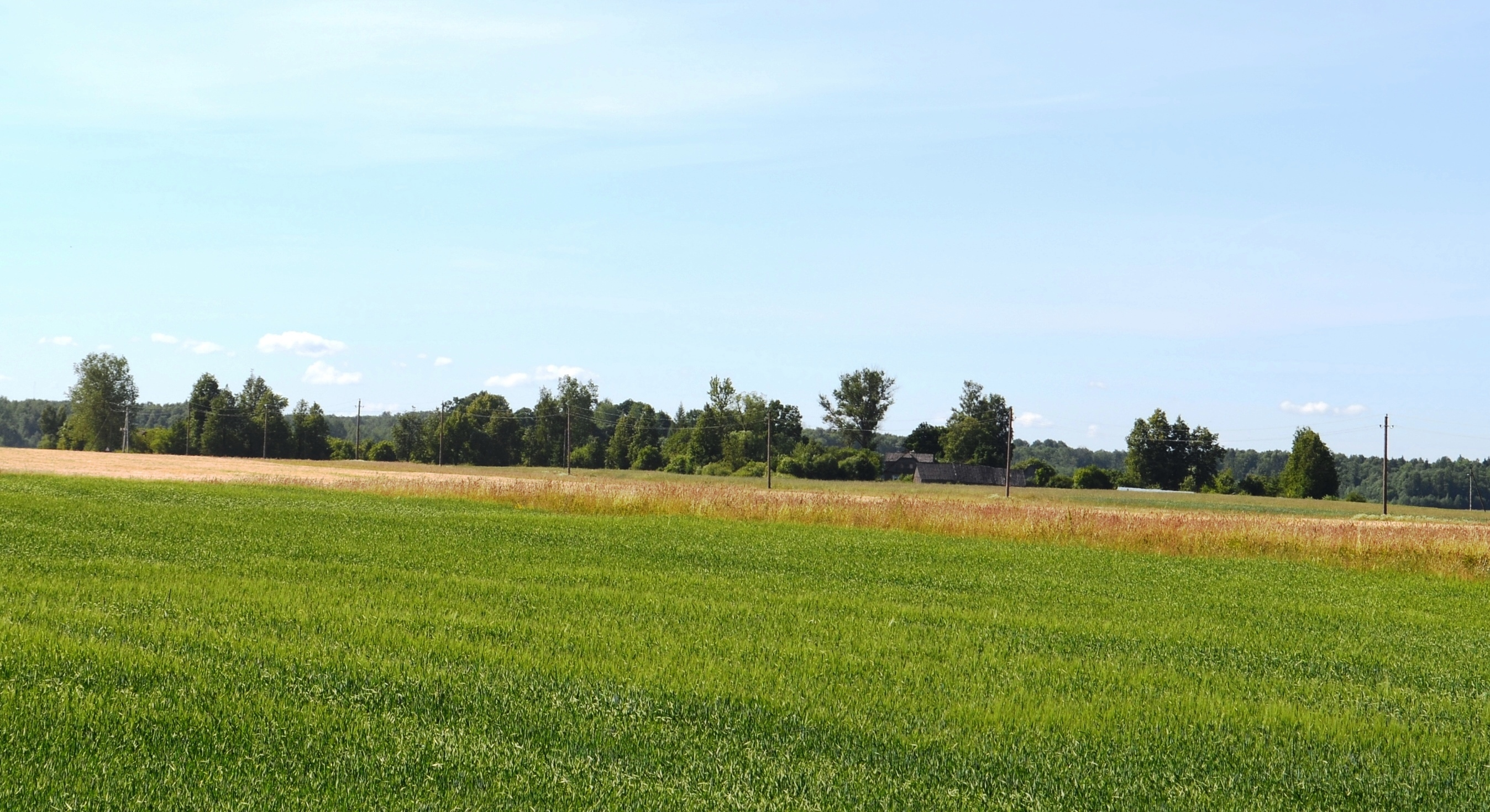

- Location in Lithuania Daubarai (Lithuania)
- Coordinates: 55°11′38″N 23°44′31″E
- Country: Lithuania
- County: Kaunas County
- Municipality: Kėdainiai district municipality
- Eldership: Josvainiai Eldership

Population (2011)
  - Total: 5
- Time zone: UTC+2 (EET)
  - Summer (DST): UTC+3 (EEST)

Daubarai (formerly Russian: Довборы, Polish: Dowbory, Dawbory) is a village in Kėdainiai district municipality, in Kaunas County, in central Lithuania. According to the 2011 census, the village had a population of 5 people. It is located 1 kilometre (0.62 mi) from Skaistgiriai, by the Kriausupys rivulet, alongside the road Kampai II-Pernarava.

== Demography ==
Historical population

Year	Pop.	±% p.a.
1902	94	—
1923	97	+0.15%
1959	63	−1.19%
1970	48	−2.44%

Year	Pop.	±% p.a.
1979	30	−5.09%
1989	11	−9.55%
2001	10	−0.79%
2011	5	−6.70%

Source: 1902, 1923, 1959 & 1970, 1979, 1989, 2001, 2011

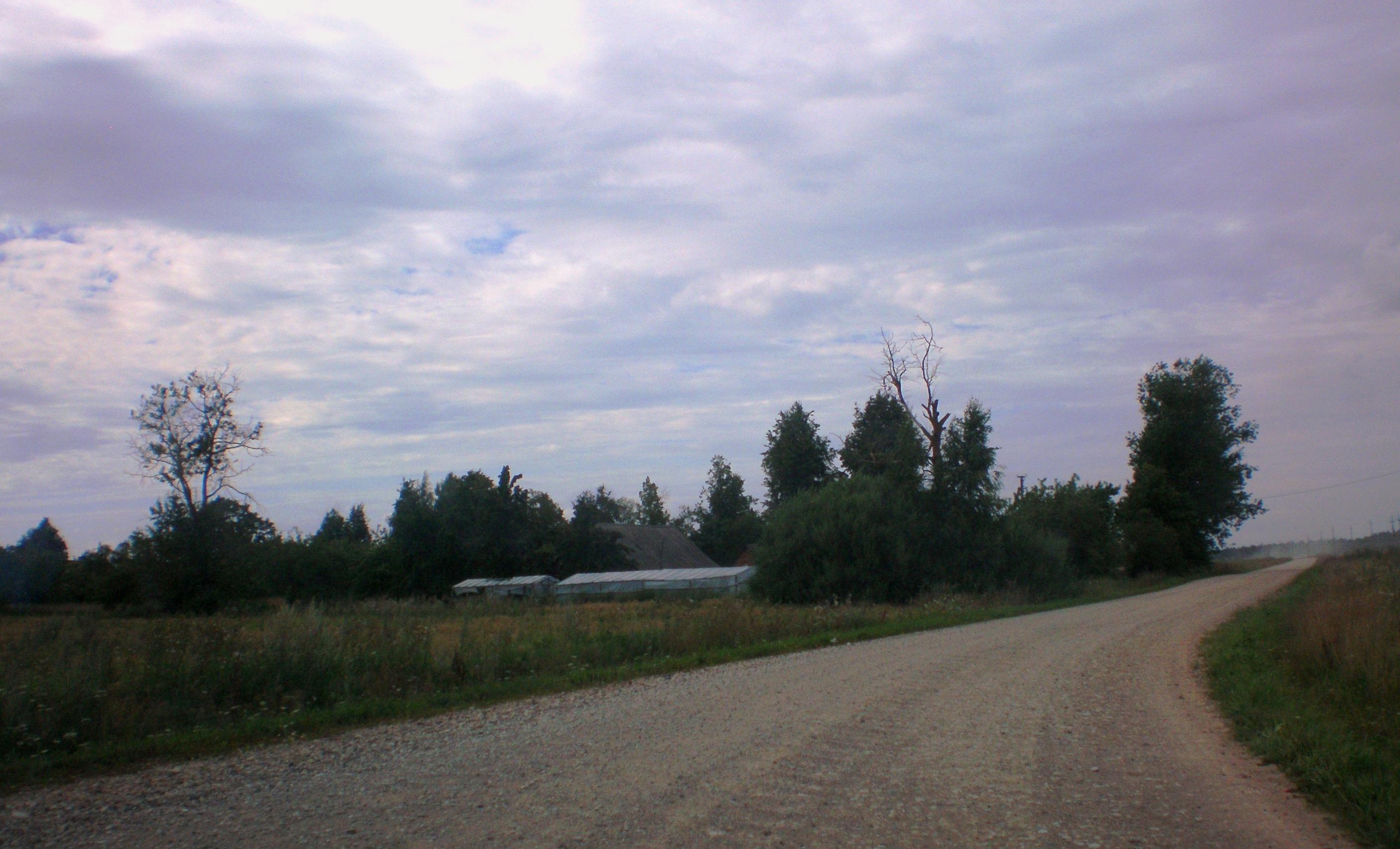
The road through Daubarai
