= Juodkaimiai =

- Village
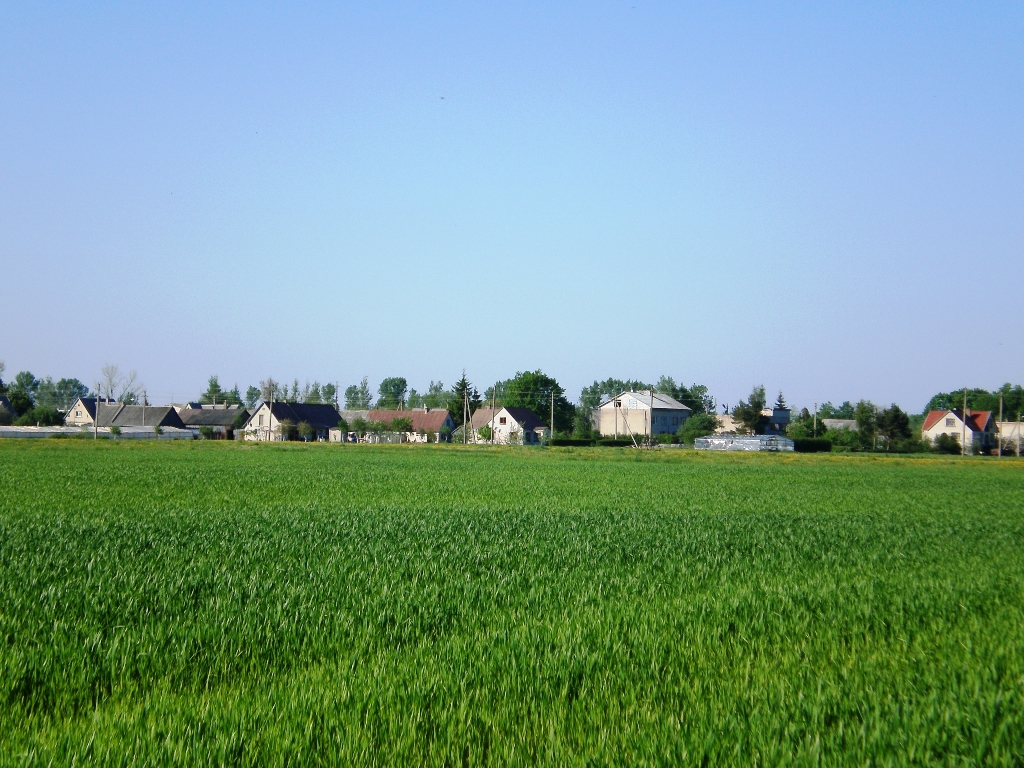

- Location in Lithuania Juodkaimiai (Lithuania)
- Coordinates: 55°14′31″N 23°49′30″E
- Country: Lithuania
- County: Kaunas County
- Municipality: Kėdainiai district municipality
- Eldership: Josvainiai Eldership

Population (2011)
  - Total: 211
- Time zone: UTC+2 (EET)
  - Summer (DST): UTC+3 (EEST)

Juodkaimiai (formerly Russian: Iоткайне, Polish: Jodkajnie, Jotkajnie) is a village in Kėdainiai district municipality, in Kaunas County, in central Lithuania. According to the 2011 census, the village had a population of 211 people. It is located next to Josvainiai town from its southern side, on the right bank of the Šušvė river, by the road Aristava-Kėdainiai-Cinkiškiai. There is Josvainiai forestry in Juodkaimiai.

== Demography ==
Historical population

Year	Pop.	±% p.a.
1900	140	—
1902	154	+4.88%
1923	136	−0.59%
1959	133	−0.06%
1970	187	+3.15%

Year	Pop.	±% p.a.
1979	271	+4.21%
1985	270	−0.06%
1989	265	−0.47%
2001	251	−0.45%
2011	211	−1.72%

Source: 1902, 1923, 1959 & 1970, 1979, 1989, 2001, 2011

== Images ==
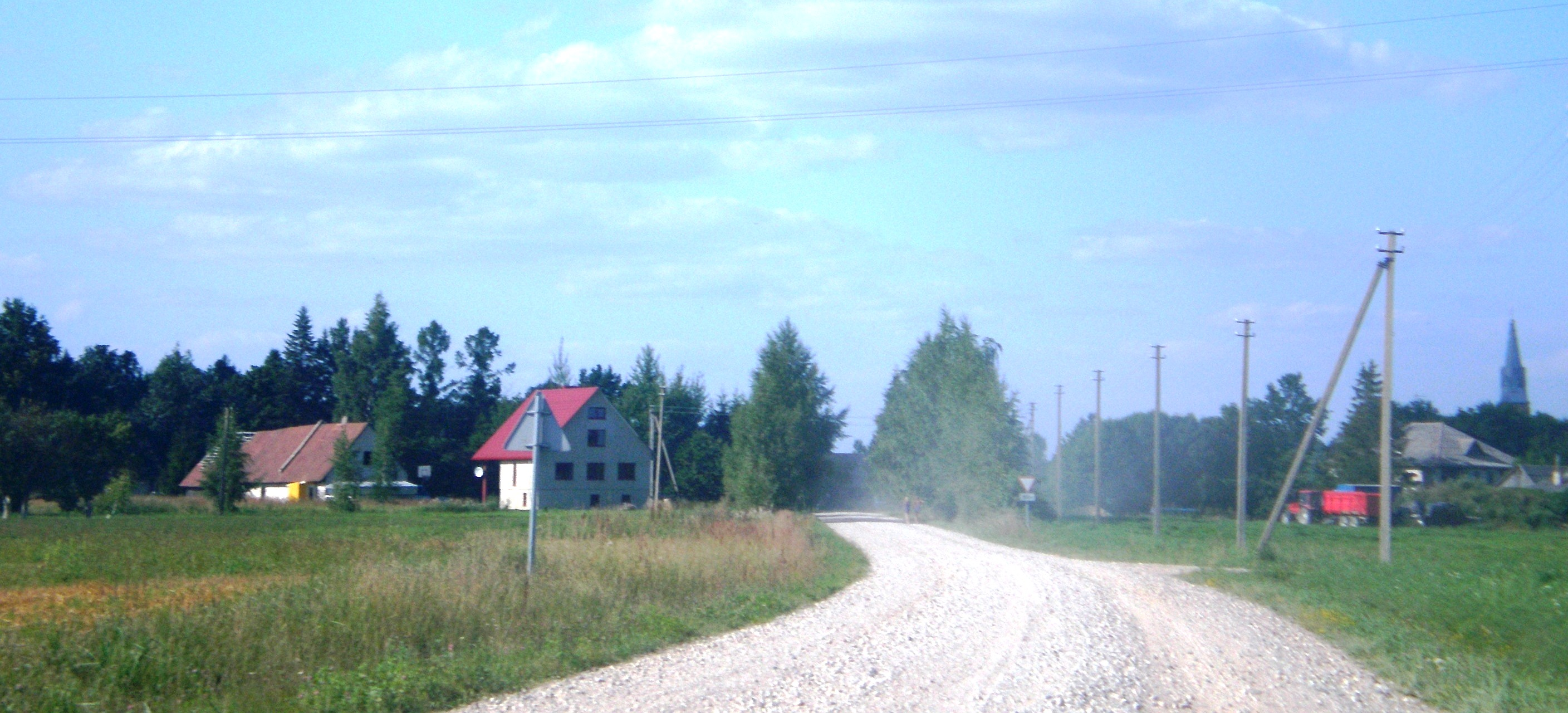
Juodkaimiai entering from Macgaliai

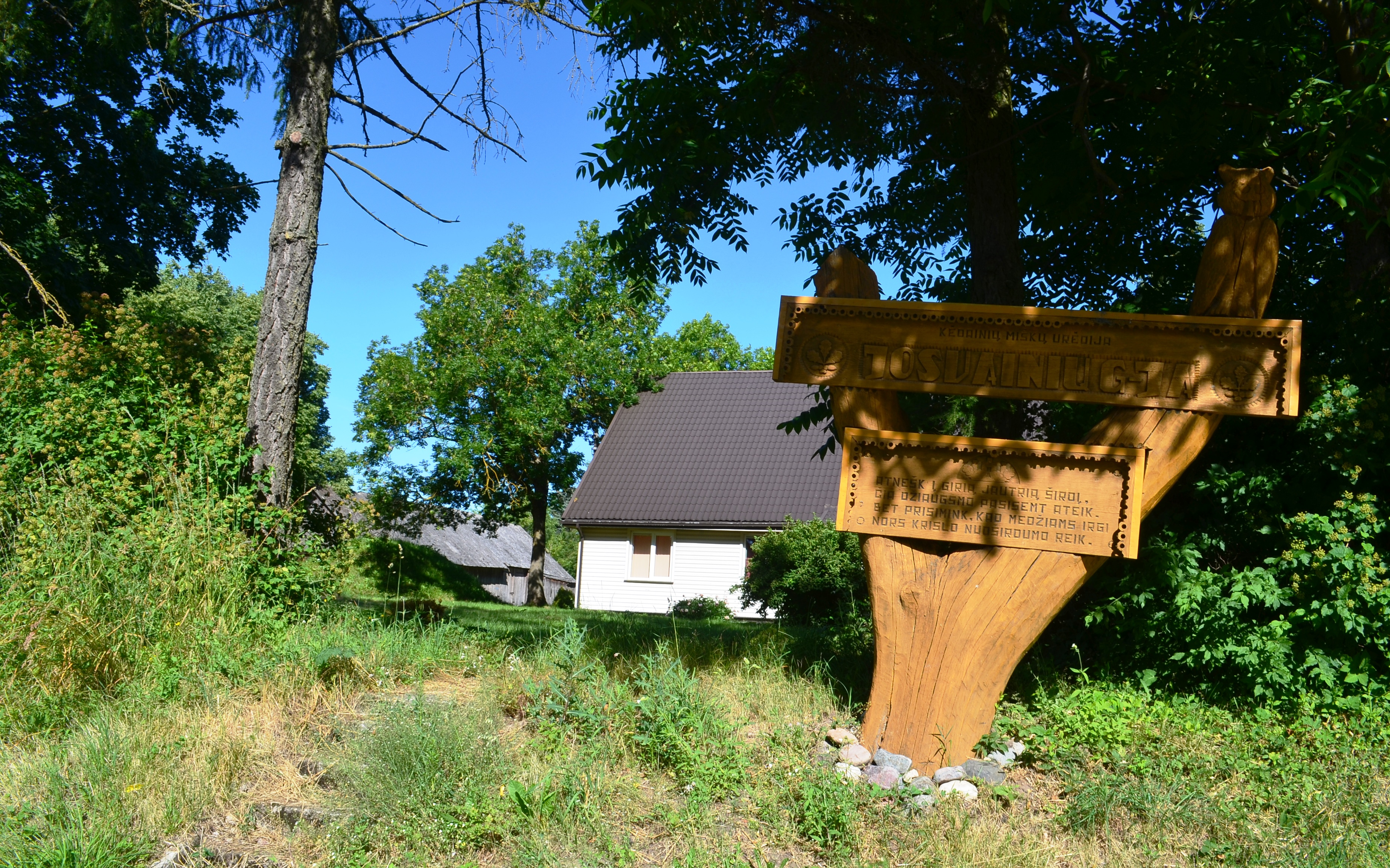
Josvainiai forestry
