= Paaluonė =

- Village
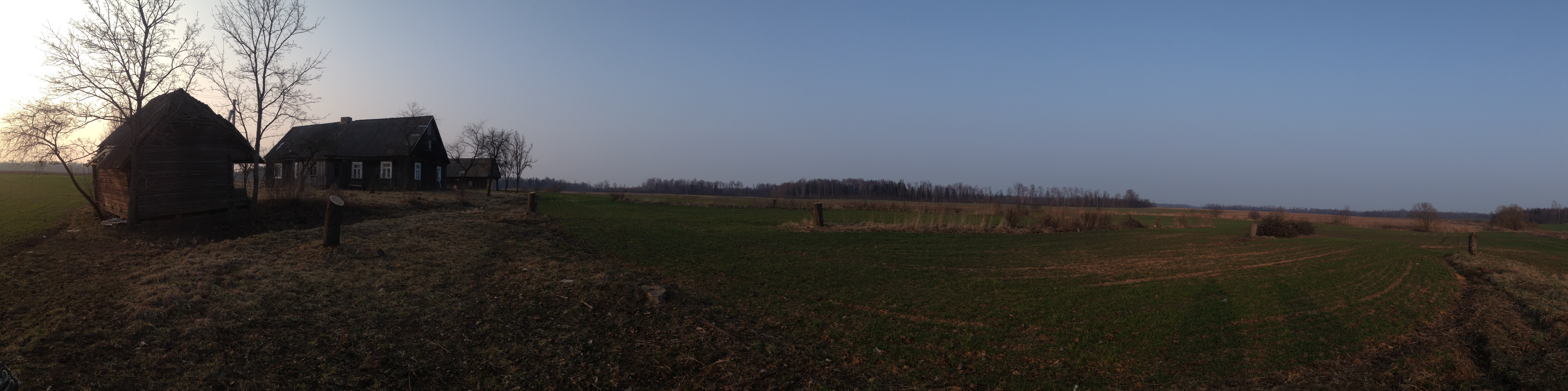

- Location in Lithuania Paaluonė (Lithuania)
- Coordinates: 55°12′10″N 23°40′40″E
- Country: Lithuania
- County: Kaunas County
- Municipality: Kėdainiai district municipality
- Eldership: Josvainiai Eldership

Population (2011)
  - Total: 0
- Time zone: UTC+2 (EET)
  - Summer (DST): UTC+3 (EEST)

Paaluonė is a village in Kėdainiai district municipality, in Kaunas County, in central Lithuania. According to the 2011 census, the village was uninhabited. It is located 2 kilometres (1.2 mi) from Skaistgiriai, by the Aluona river and its tributaries the Sakuona and the Leštupys, surrounded by the Pernarava-Šaravai Forest.

== Demography ==
Historical population

| Year | Pop. | ±% p.a. |
|---|---|---|
| 1923 | 8 | — |
| 1959 | 93 | +7.05% |
| 1970 | 64 | −3.34% |
| 1979 | 25 | −9.92% |

| Year | Pop. | ±% p.a. |
|---|---|---|
| 1989 | 4 | −16.74% |
| 2001 | 0 | −100.00% |
| 2011 | 0 | 0.00% |

Source: 1902, 1923, 1959 & 1970, 1979, 1989, 2001, 2011
