= Gailiakaimis =

- Village
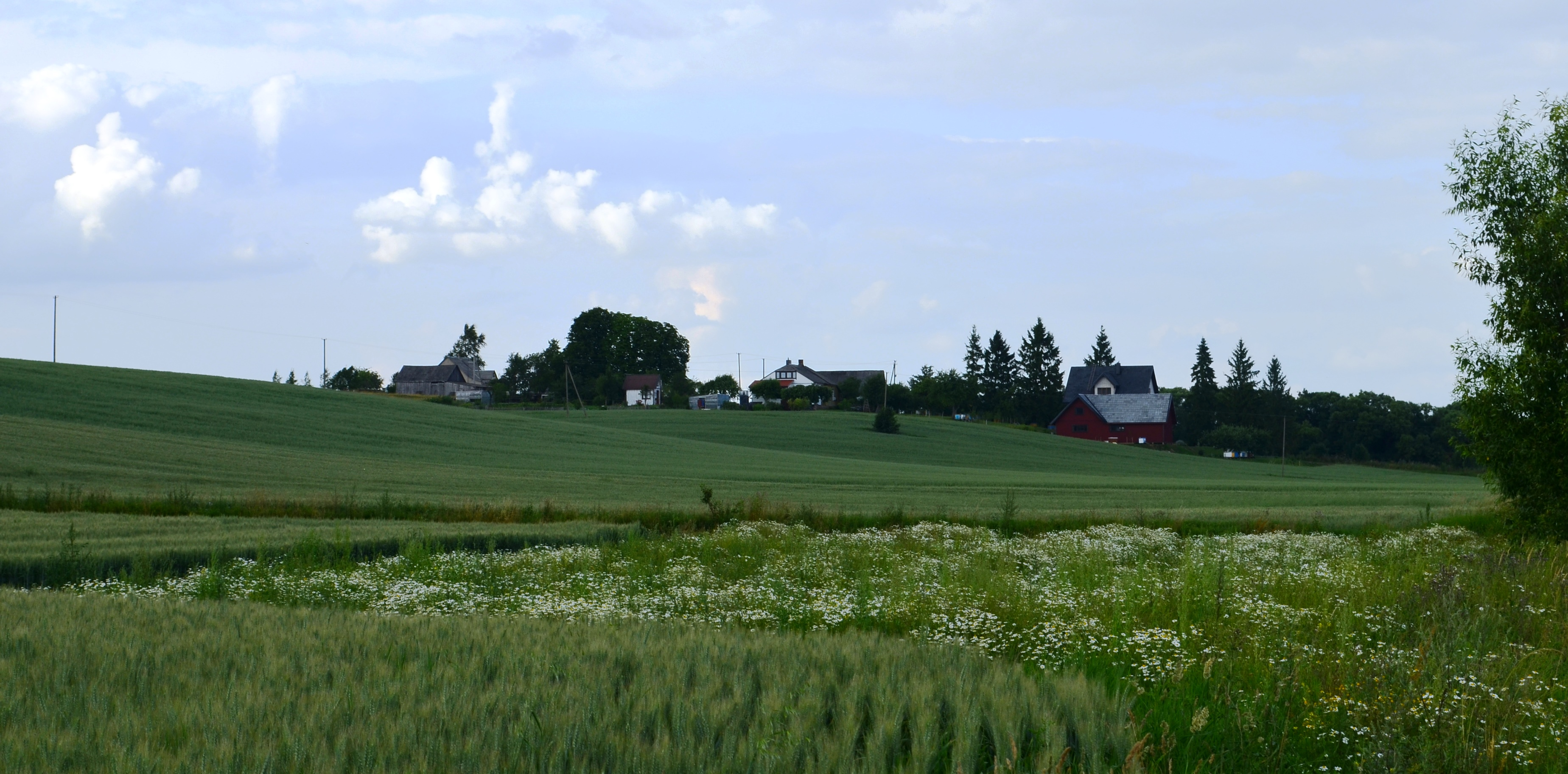

- Location in Lithuania Gailiakaimis (Lithuania)
- Coordinates: 55°10′19″N 23°48′00″E
- Country: Lithuania
- County: Kaunas County
- Municipality: Kėdainiai district municipality
- Eldership: Josvainiai Eldership

Population (2011)
  - Total: 18
- Time zone: UTC+2 (EET)
  - Summer (DST): UTC+3 (EEST)

Gailiakaimis is a village in Kėdainiai district municipality, in Kaunas County, in central Lithuania. According to the 2011 census, the village had a population of 18 people. It is located 1.5 kilometres (0.93 mi) from Kampai II, by the Domeikiškė rivulet, nearby the Nevėžis river.

== Demography ==
Historical population

| Year | Pop. | ±% p.a. |
|---|---|---|
| 1959 | 98 | — |
| 1970 | 69 | −3.14% |
| 1979 | 34 | −7.56% |

| Year | Pop. | ±% p.a. |
|---|---|---|
| 1989 | 21 | −4.70% |
| 2001 | 23 | +0.76% |
| 2011 | 18 | −2.42% |

Source: 1902, 1923, 1959 & 1970, 1979, 1989, 2001, 2011
