= Paliepiukai, Kėdainiai =

Paliepiukai
- Village
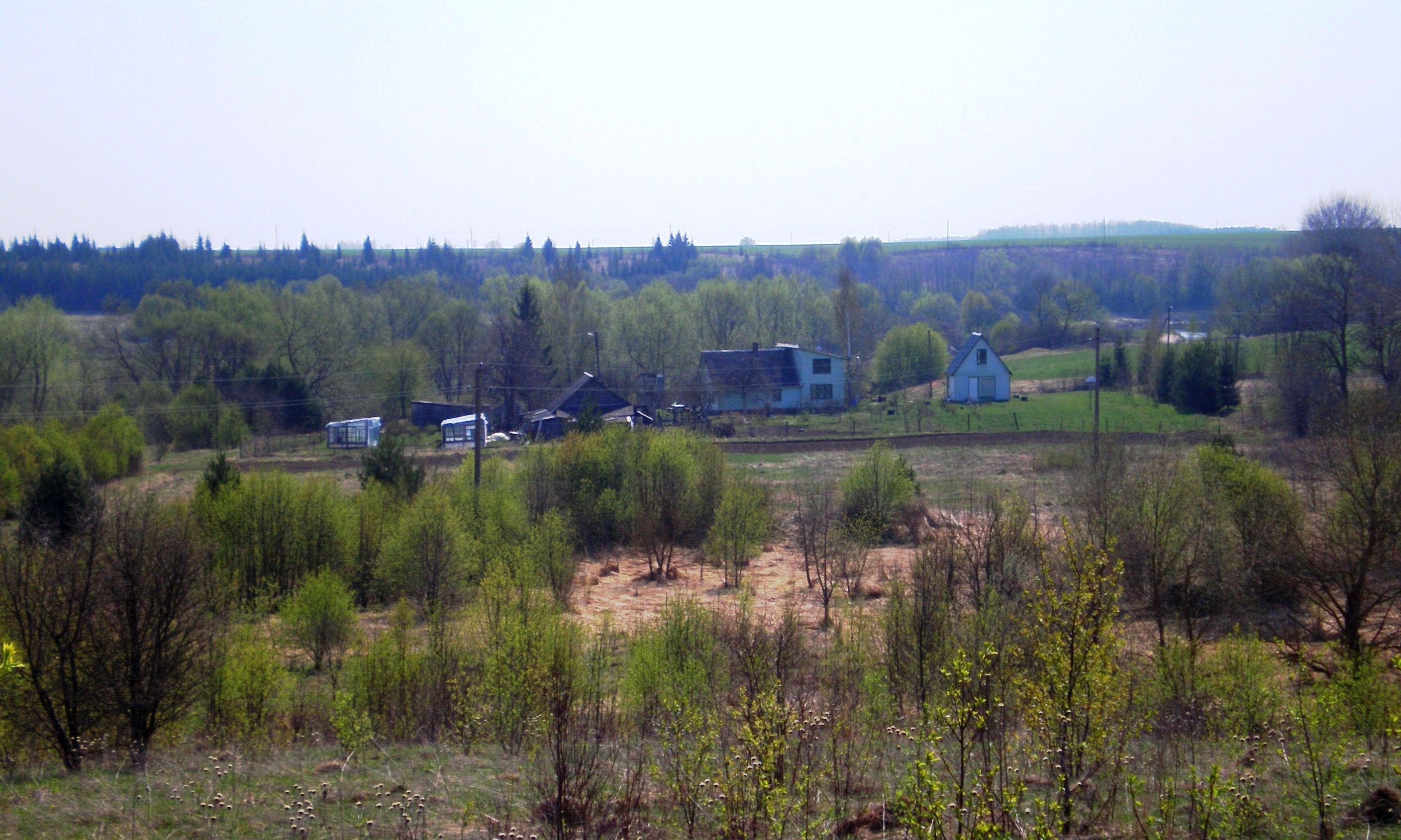

- Location in Lithuania Paliepiukai (Lithuania)
- Coordinates: 55°10′52″N 23°49′52″E
- Country: Lithuania
- County: Kaunas County
- Municipality: Kėdainiai district municipality
- Eldership: Josvainiai Eldership

Population (2011)
  - Total: 18
- Time zone: UTC+2 (EET)
  - Summer (DST): UTC+3 (EEST)

Paliepiukai ('little place under lime trees', formerly Russian: Полепи, Polish: Polepie) is a village in Kėdainiai district municipality, in Kaunas County, in central Lithuania. According to the 2011 census, the village had a population of 18 people. It is located 1.5 kilometres (0.93 mi) from Kampai II, nearby the confluence of the Nevėžis and the Šušvė rivers, next to the Šušvė Landscape Sanctuary. There is a large gravel pit. A small cemetery is located in the village.

Formerly it was a place of the Paliepiai manor.

== Demography ==
Historical population

Year	Pop.	±% p.a.
1902	47	—
1959	65	+0.57%
1970	41	−4.10%
1979	24	−5.78%

Year	Pop.	±% p.a.
1989	15	−4.59%
2001	16	+0.54%
2011	18	+1.18%

Source: 1902, 1923, 1959 & 1970, 1979, 1989, 2001, 2011

== Gallery ==
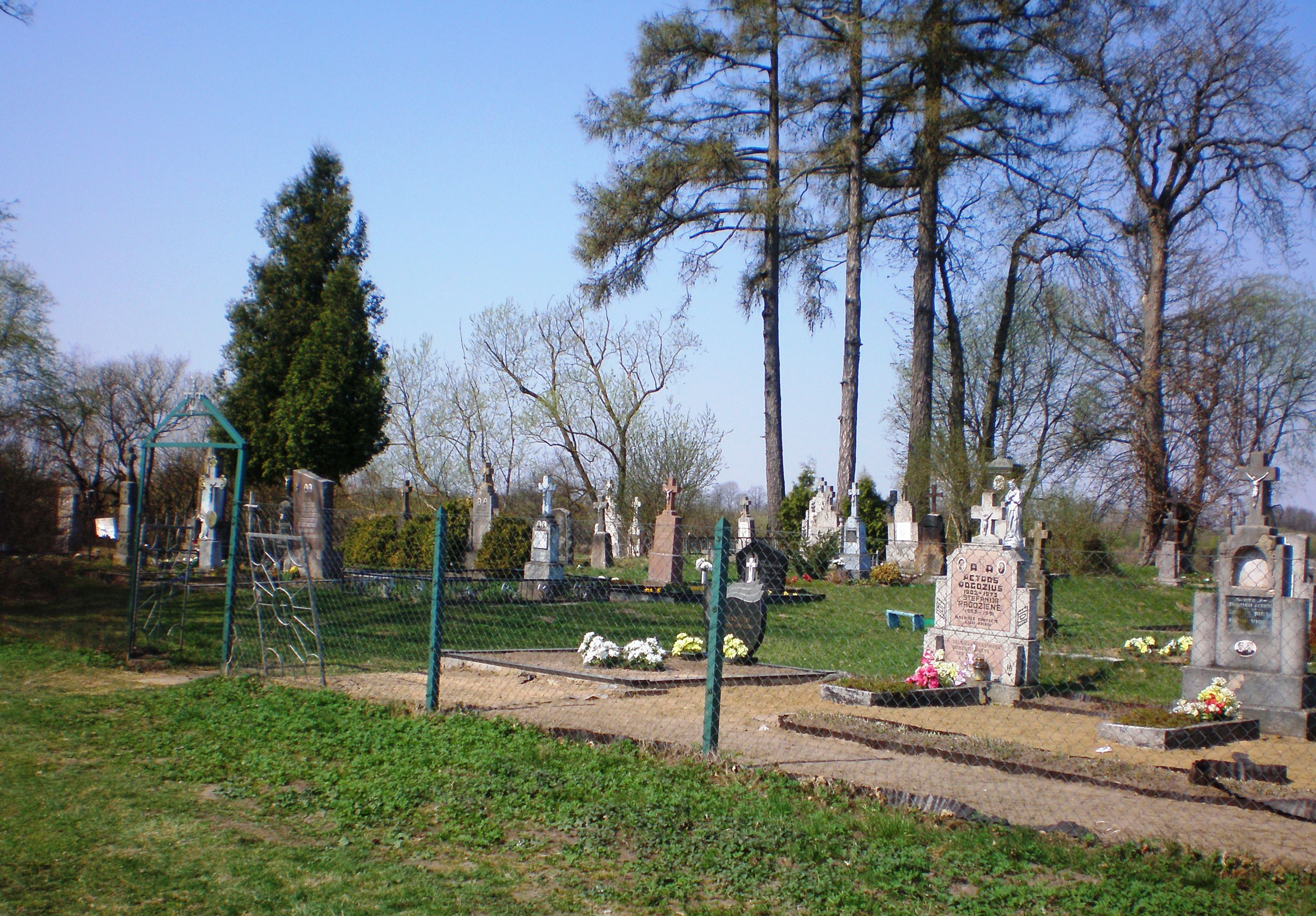
Cemetery

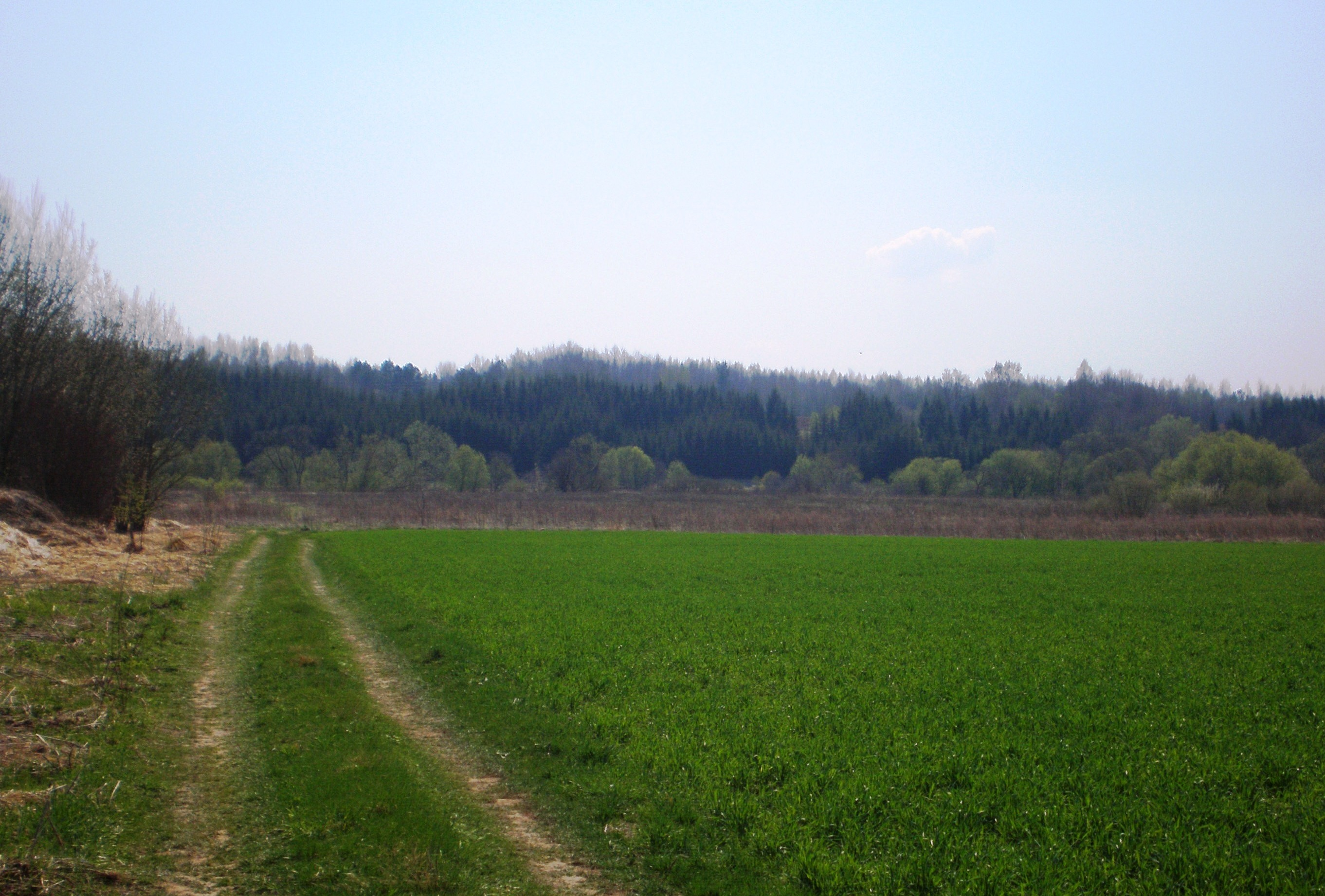
Nevėžis valley meadows in Paliepiukai

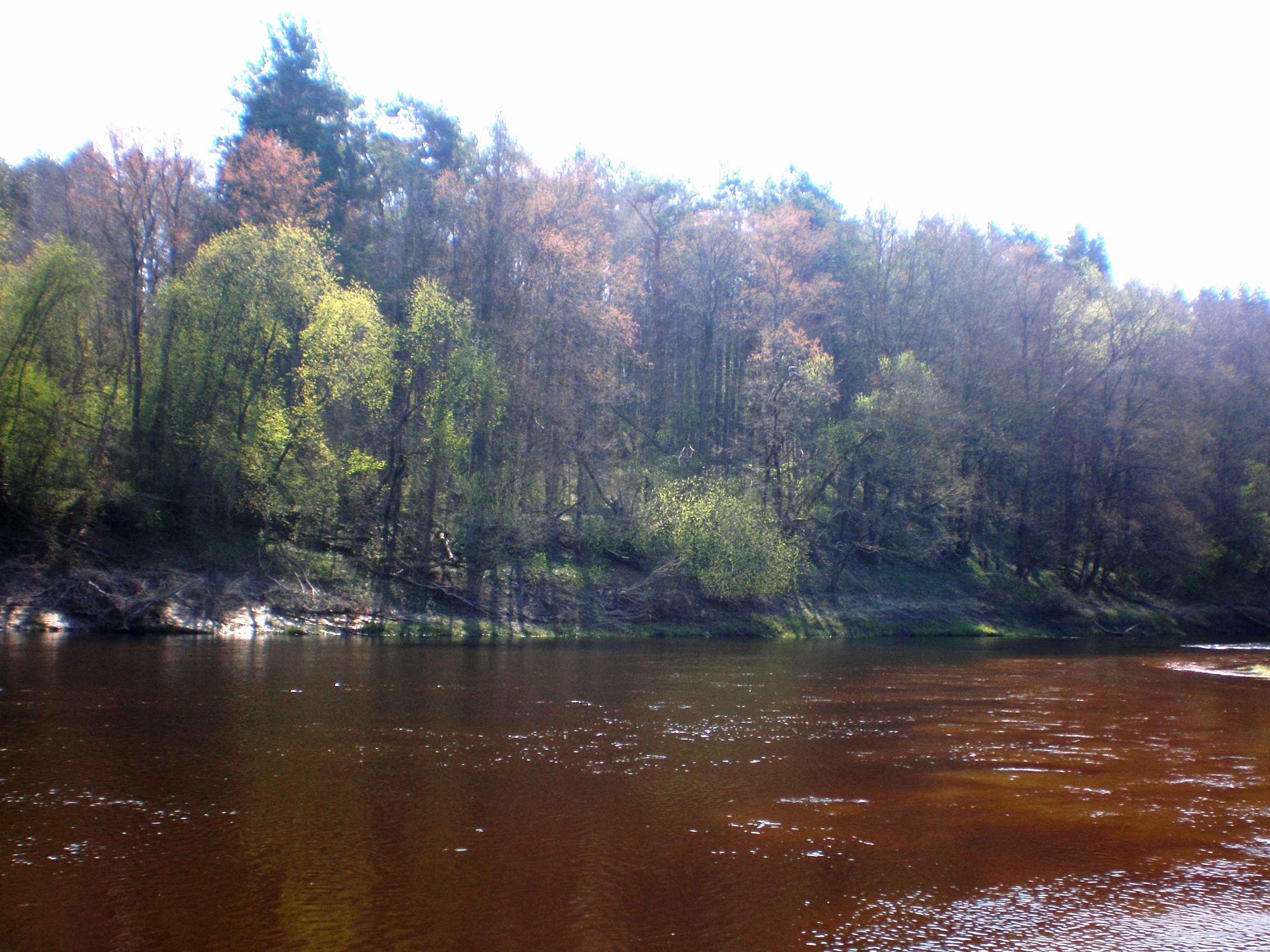
Nevėžis nearby Paliepiukai

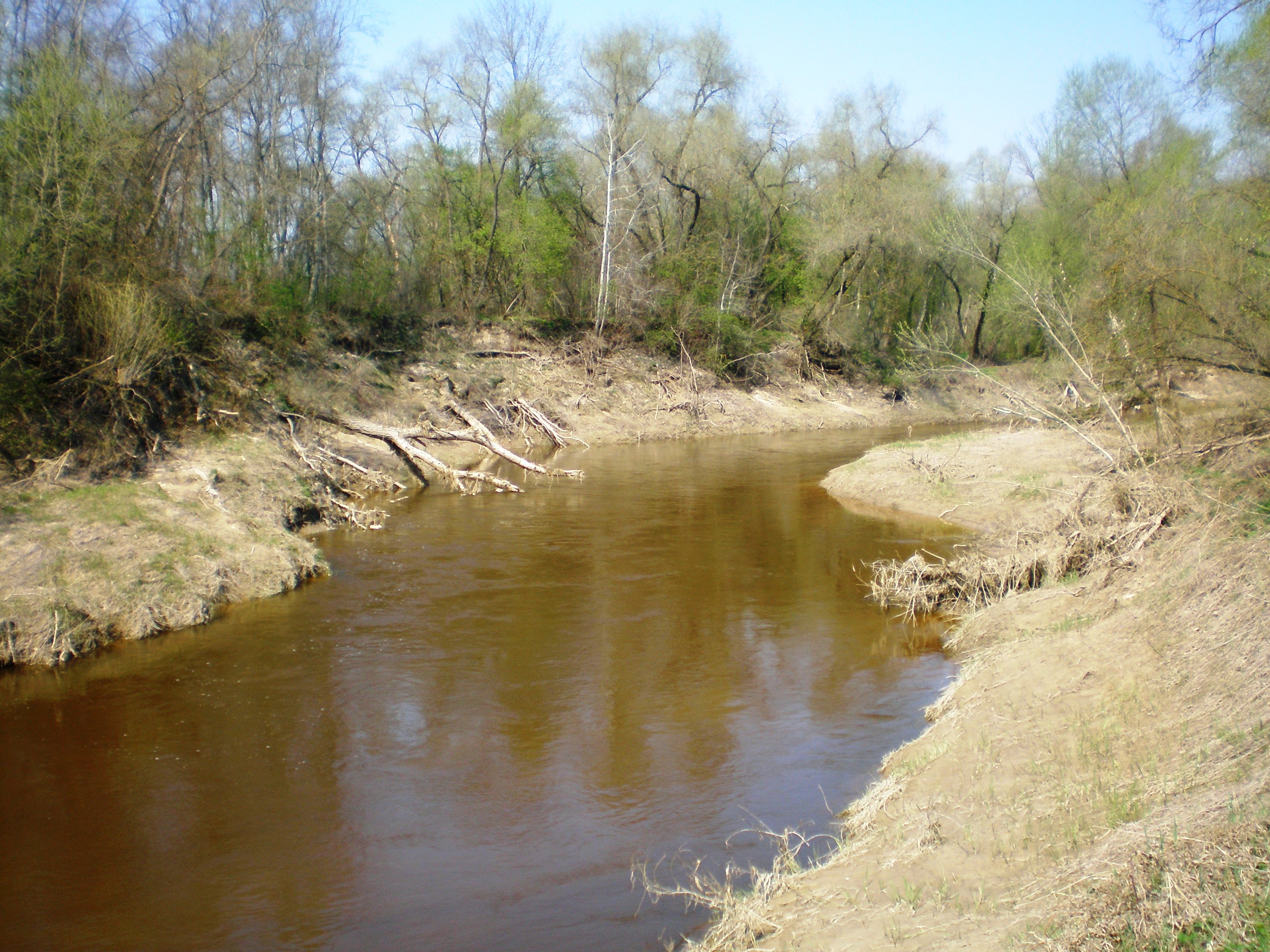
Šušvė nearby Paliepiukai
