= Pasmilgys, Josvainiai =

Pasmilgys
- Hamlet
- Location in Lithuania Pasmilgys (Lithuania)
- Coordinates: 55°17′40″N 23°49′0″E
- Country: Lithuania
- County: Kaunas County
- Municipality: Kėdainiai district municipality
- Eldership: Josvainiai Eldership

Population (2011)
  - Total: 0
- Time zone: UTC+2 (EET)
  - Summer (DST): UTC+3 (EEST)

Pasmilgys is a hamlet in Kėdainiai district municipality, in Kaunas County, in central Lithuania. According to the 2011 census, the hamlet was uninhabited. It is located 3 kilometres (1.9 mi) from Lipliūnai, by the Smilgaitis river, inside the Josvainiai Forest.

== Demography ==
Historical population

Year	Pop.	±% p.a.
1959	15	—
1970	14	−0.63%
1979	5	−10.81%

Year	Pop.	±% p.a.
1989	2	−8.76%
2001	0	−100.00%
2011	0	0.00%

Source: 1902, 1923, 1959 & 1970, 1979, 1989, 2001, 2011
