= Maleikoniai =

- Village
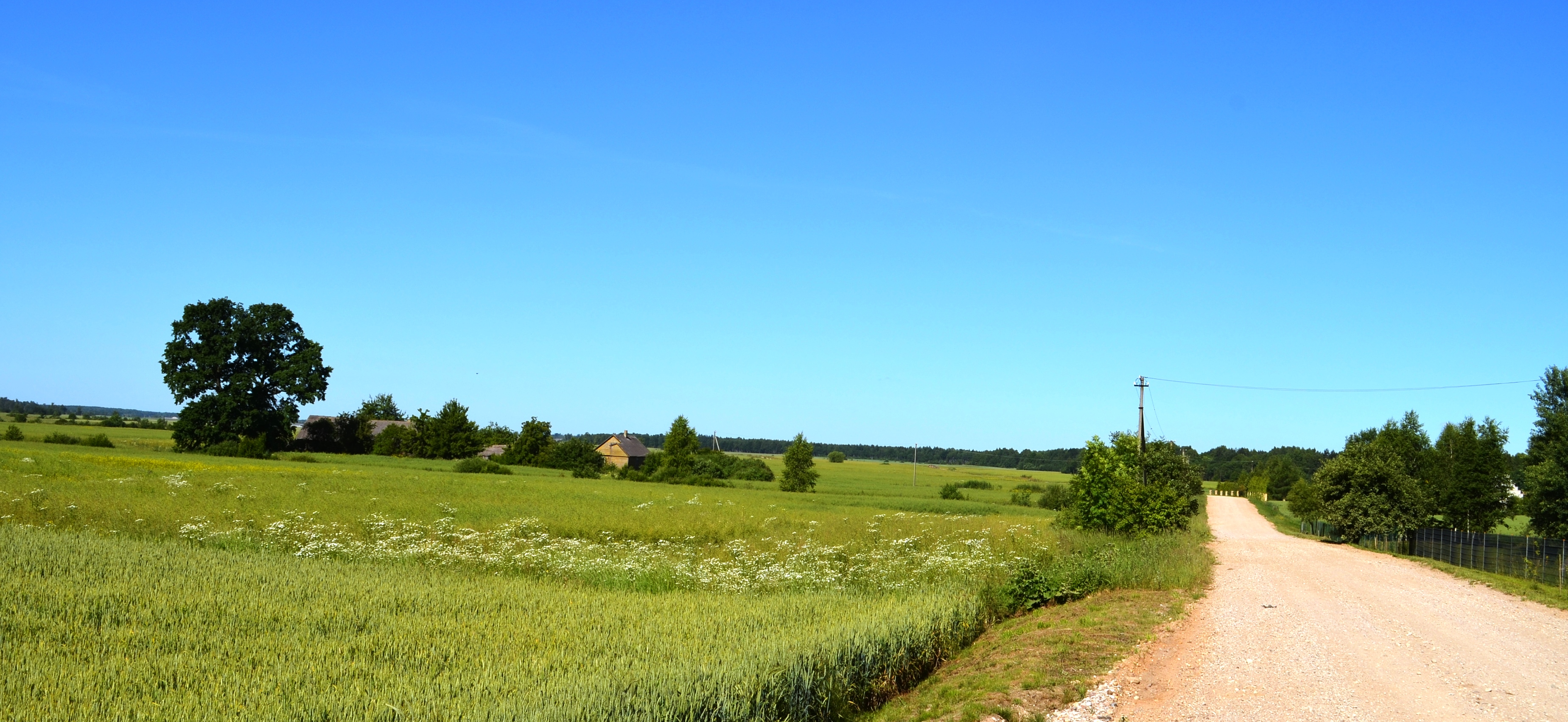

- Location in Lithuania Maleikoniai (Lithuania)
- Coordinates: 55°12′00″N 23°48′22″E
- Country: Lithuania
- County: Kaunas County
- Municipality: Kėdainiai district municipality
- Eldership: Josvainiai Eldership

Population (2011)
  - Total: 55
- Time zone: UTC+2 (EET)
  - Summer (DST): UTC+3 (EEST)

Maleikoniai (Malaikoniai, Maleikonys, formerly Russian: Малайковичи, Polish: Małakowicze) is a village in Kėdainiai district municipality, in Kaunas County, in central Lithuania. According to the 2011 census, the village had a population of 55 people. It is located 1.5 kilometres (0.93 mi) from Kunioniai, between the Slajus rivulet and the Pernarava-Šaravai Forest, alongside the 299 Aristava-Kėdainiai-Cinkiškiai road.

There is a new manor style conference hall and rural tourism house.

== Demography ==
Historical population

| Year | Pop. | ±% p.a. |
|---|---|---|
| 1902 | 130 | — |
| 1923 | 198 | +2.02% |
| 1959 | 196 | −0.03% |
| 1970 | 152 | −2.28% |

| Year | Pop. | ±% p.a. |
|---|---|---|
| 1979 | 59 | −9.98% |
| 1989 | 36 | −4.82% |
| 2001 | 31 | −1.24% |
| 2011 | 55 | +5.90% |

Source: 1902, 1923, 1959 & 1970, 1979, 1989, 2001, 2011

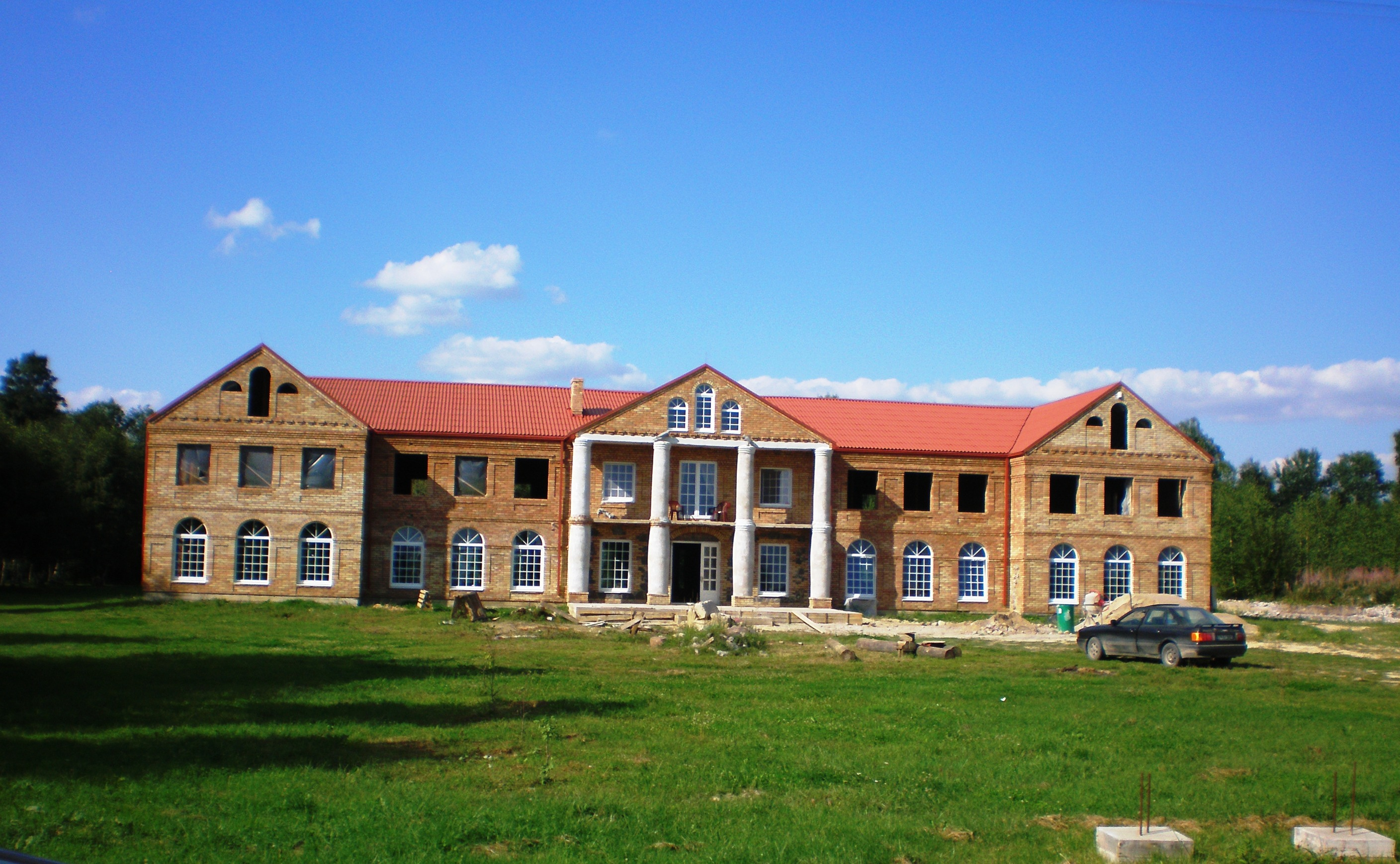
Maleikoniai "manor"
