= Antanava, Josvainiai =

Antanava
- Hamlet
- Location in Lithuania Antanava (Lithuania)
- Coordinates: 55°16′41″N 23°45′11″E
- Country: Lithuania
- County: Kaunas County
- Municipality: Kėdainiai district municipality
- Eldership: Josvainiai Eldership

Population (2011)
  - Total: 0
- Time zone: UTC+2 (EET)
  - Summer (DST): UTC+3 (EEST)

Antanava (formerly Russian: Антоново, Polish: Antonowo) is a hamlet in Kėdainiai district municipality, in Kaunas County, in central Lithuania. According to the 2011 census, the hamlet was uninhabited. It is located 0.5 kilometres (0.31 mi) from Angiriai, on the right bank of the Šušvė river.

At the beginning of the 20th century there was a manor (a property of the Kočanai family).

== Demography ==
Historical population

Year	Pop.	±% p.a.
1902	20	—
1923	32	+2.26%
1959	18	−1.59%
1970	7	−8.23%

Year	Pop.	±% p.a.
1979	5	−3.67%
1989	4	−2.21%
2001	0	−100.00%
2011	0	0.00%

Source: 1902, 1923, 1959 & 1970, 1979, 1989, 2001, 2011
