= Paliepiai, Kėdainiai =

Paliepiai
- Village
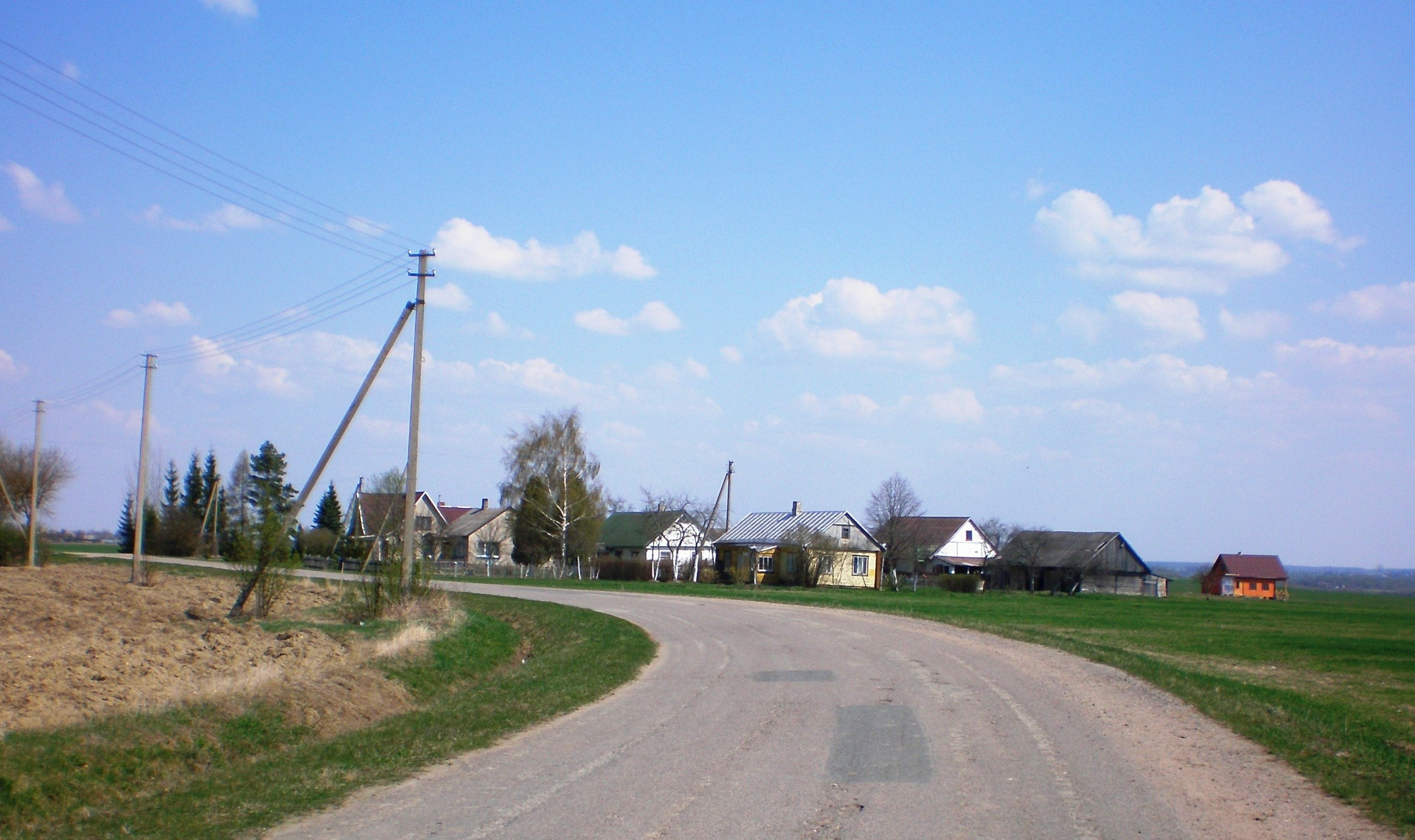

- Location in Lithuania Paliepiai (Lithuania)
- Coordinates: 55°11′10″N 23°50′38″E
- Country: Lithuania
- County: Kaunas County
- Municipality: Kėdainiai district municipality
- Eldership: Josvainiai Eldership

Population (2011)
  - Total: 38
- Time zone: UTC+2 (EET)
  - Summer (DST): UTC+3 (EEST)

Paliepiai ('place under lime trees', formerly Russian: Полепи, Polish: Polepie) is a village in Kėdainiai district municipality, in Kaunas County, in central Lithuania. According to the 2011 census, the village had a population of 38 people. It is located 2 kilometres (1.2 mi) from Kunioniai, between the Nevėžis and the Šušvė rivers, next to the Šušvė Landscape Sanctuary.

At the beginning of the 20th century there were watermill, distillery and manor (a property of the Daugirdos family).

== Demography ==
Historical population

Year	Pop.	±% p.a.
1902	100	—
1923	111	+0.50%
1959	57	−1.83%
1970	91	+4.34%

Year	Pop.	±% p.a.
1979	96	+0.60%
1989	44	−7.51%
2001	25	−4.60%
2011	38	+4.28%

Source: 1902, 1923, 1959 & 1970, 1979, 1989, 2001, 2011
