= Bajėnai I =

- Village
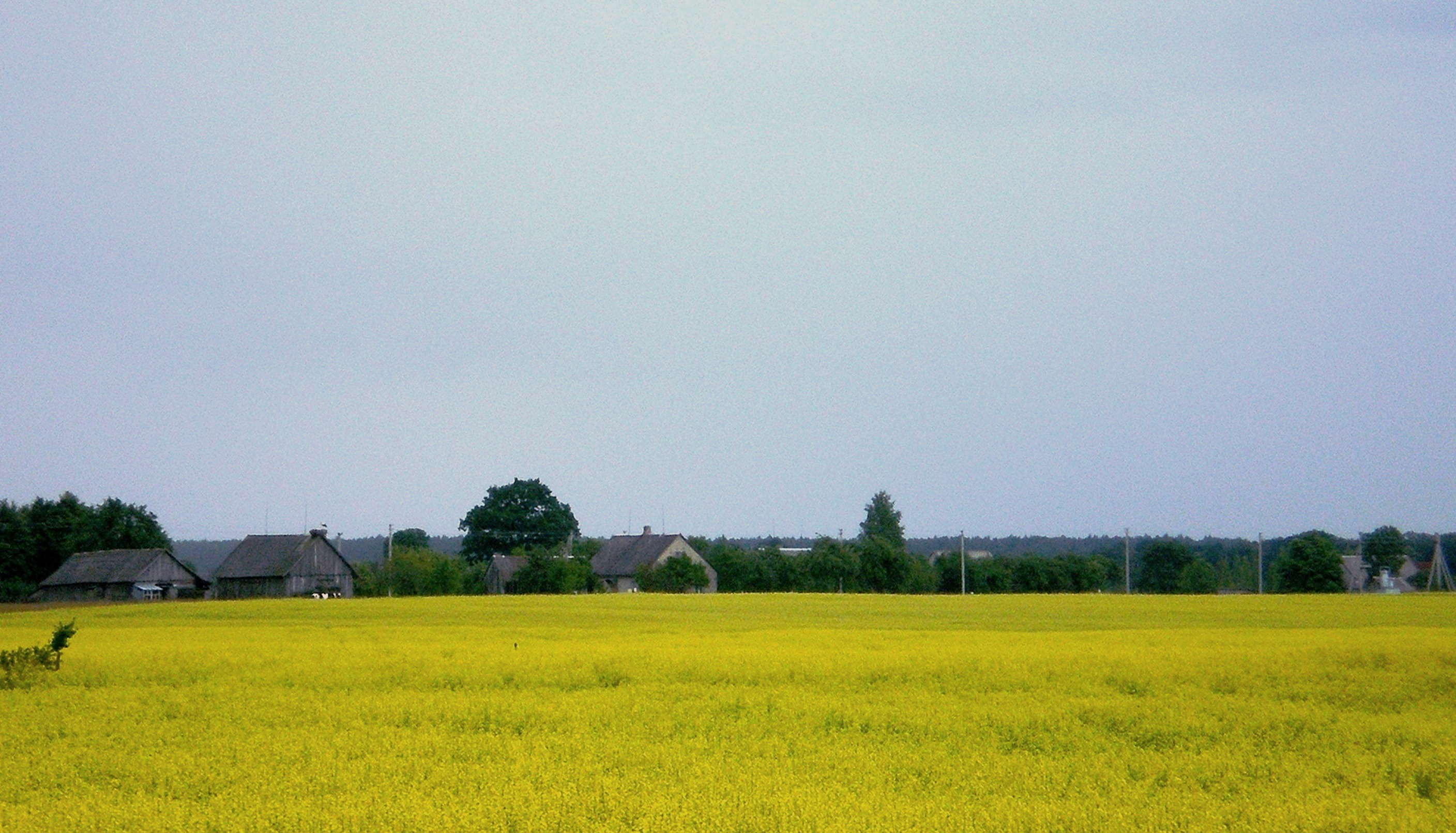

- Location in Lithuania Bajėnai I (Lithuania)
- Coordinates: 55°10′01″N 23°45′50″E
- Country: Lithuania
- County: Kaunas County
- Municipality: Kėdainiai district municipality
- Eldership: Josvainiai Eldership

Population (2011)
  - Total: 29
- Time zone: UTC+2 (EET)
  - Summer (DST): UTC+3 (EEST)

Bajėnai I (Bajėnai 1st, formerly Russian: Бояны, Polish: Bojany) is a village in Kėdainiai district municipality, in Kaunas County, in central Lithuania. According to the 2011 census, the village had a population of 29 people. It is located 4.5 kilometres (2.8 mi) from Skaistgiriai, by the Kriaušiupys rivulet, nearby the road Aristava-Kėdainiai-Cinkiškiai.

== History ==
A fragment of an ancient stone axe has been found in Bajėnai I. The Bajėnai Manor is known since the end of the 16th century. In the 19th century, it belonged to the Tyszkiewicz family and later to the Jesuits. They have created a dairy and vegetable farm in Bajėnai.

== Demography ==
Historical population

Year	Pop.	±% p.a.
1902	110	—
1923	243	+3.85%
1959	175	−0.91%
1970	151	−1.33%
1979	81	−6.69%

Year	Pop.	±% p.a.
1984	65	−4.31%
1989	39	−9.71%
2001	46	+1.39%
2011	29	−4.51%

Source: 1902, 1923, 1959 & 1970, 1979, 1989, 2001, 2011

== Images ==
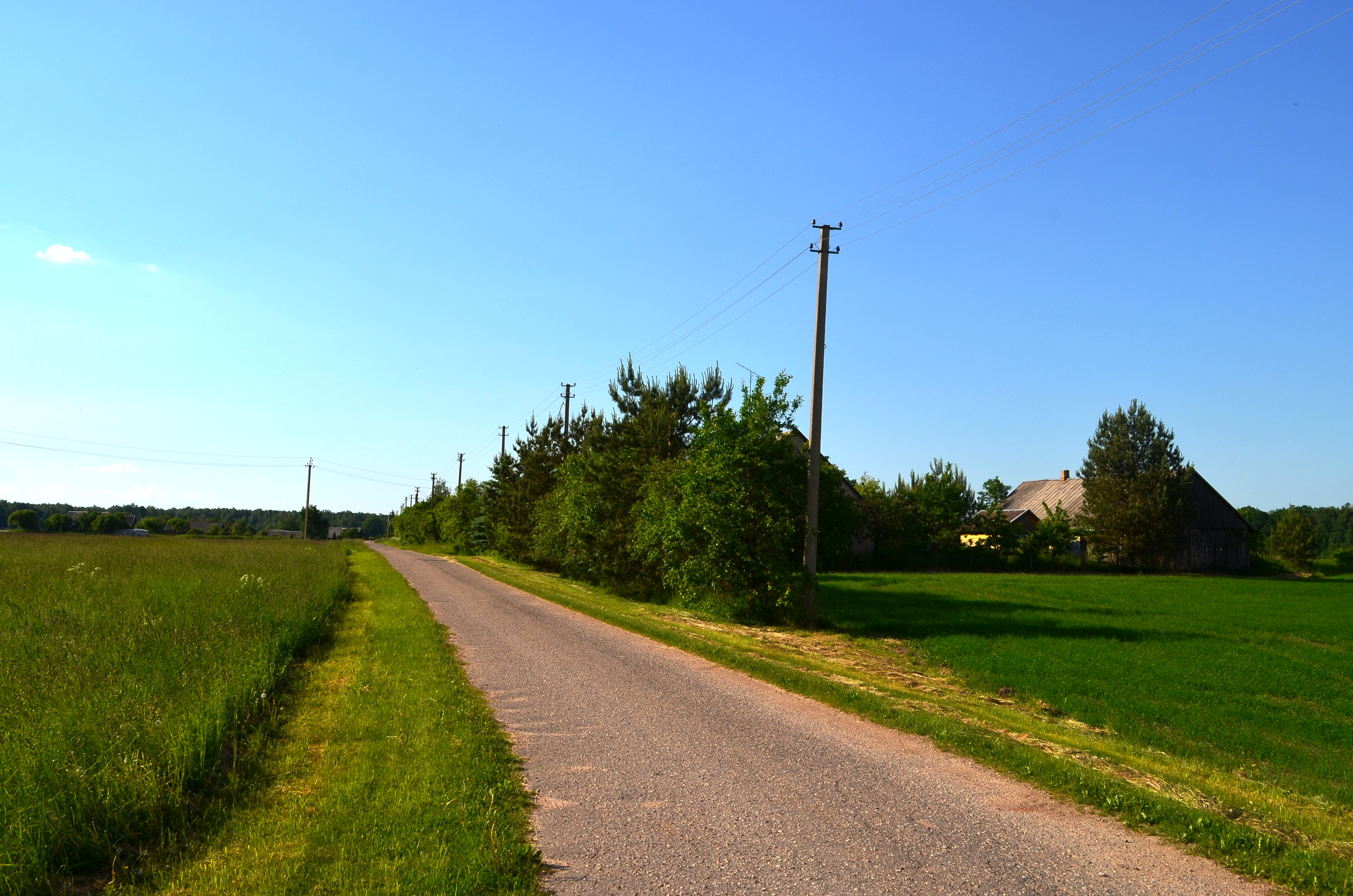
A street of the village

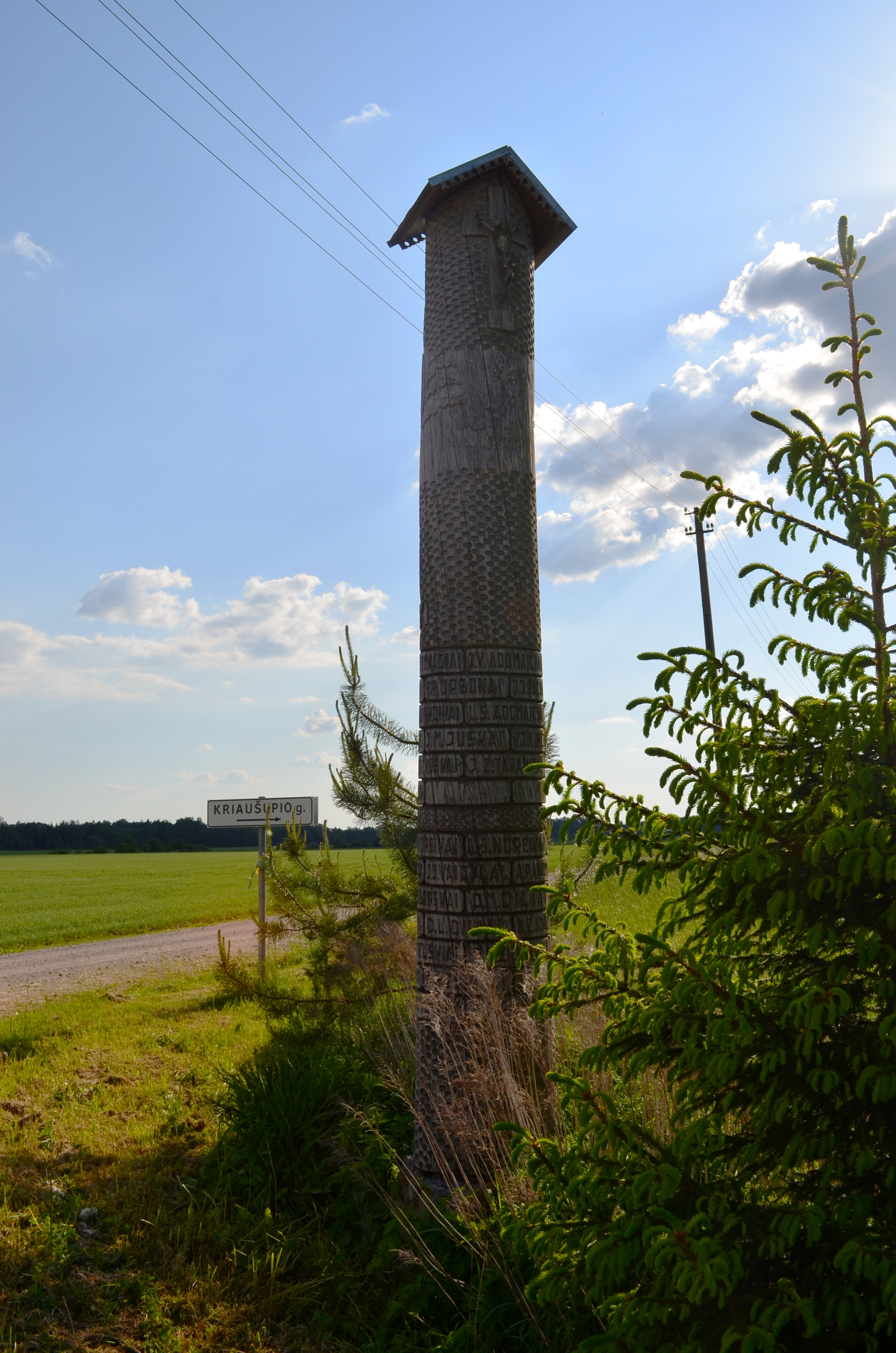
A commemorative roofed pole to the exiled villagers from Bajėnai I
