= Graužiai, Kunioniai =

Graužiai
- Village
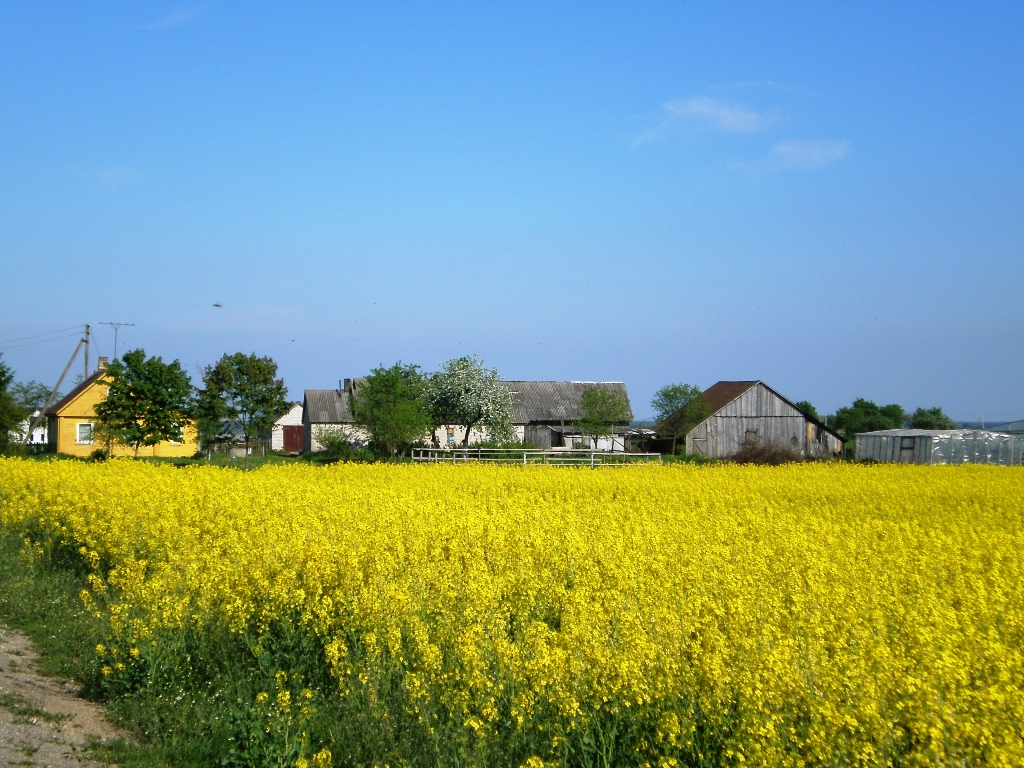

- Location in Lithuania Graužiai (Lithuania)
- Coordinates: 55°12′22″N 23°47′49″E
- Country: Lithuania
- County: Kaunas County
- Municipality: Kėdainiai district municipality
- Eldership: Josvainiai Eldership

Population (2011)
  - Total: 0
- Time zone: UTC+2 (EET)
  - Summer (DST): UTC+3 (EEST)

Graužiai is a village in Kėdainiai district municipality, in Kaunas County, in central Lithuania. According to the 2011 census, the village was uninhabited. It is located 0.5 kilometres (0.31 mi) from Kunioniai, nearby the Pernarava-Šaravai Forest.

In Soviet era it was in Kunioniai selsovet.

== Demography ==
Historical population

Year	Pop.	±% p.a.
1959	68	—
1970	46	−3.49%
1979	13	−13.10%

Year	Pop.	±% p.a.
1989	5	−9.11%
2001	0	−100.00%
2011	0	0.00%

Source: 1902, 1923, 1959 & 1970, 1979, 1989, 2001, 2011
