= Macgaliai =

- Village
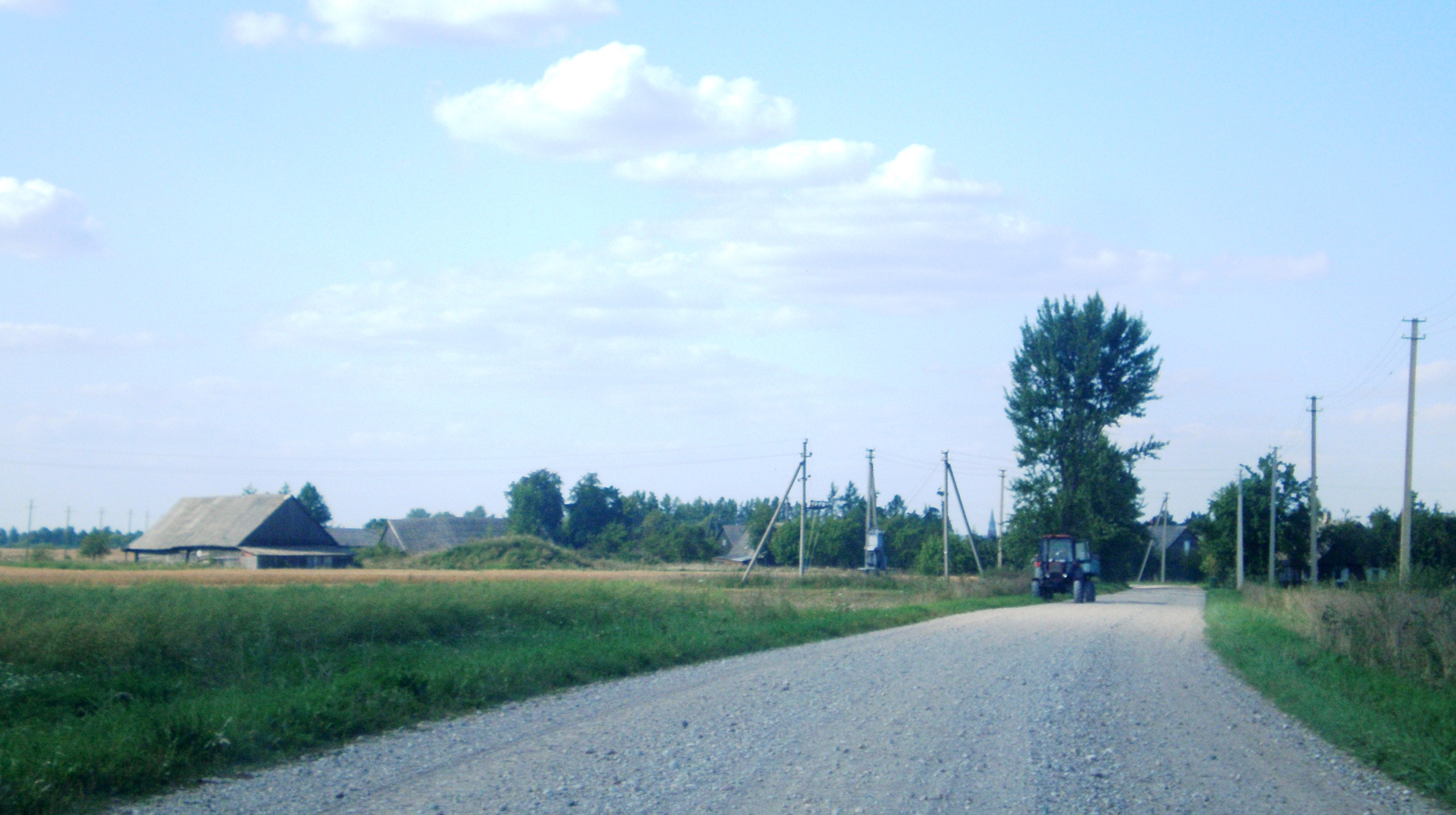

- Location in Lithuania Macgaliai (Lithuania)
- Coordinates: 55°13′19″N 23°49′59″E
- Country: Lithuania
- County: Kaunas County
- Municipality: Kėdainiai district municipality
- Eldership: Josvainiai Eldership

Population (2011)
  - Total: 10
- Time zone: UTC+2 (EET)
  - Summer (DST): UTC+3 (EEST)

Macgaliai (formerly Russian: Модзголе, Polish: Mozgole) is a village in Kėdainiai district municipality, in Kaunas County, in central Lithuania. According to the 2011 census, the village had a population of 10 people. It is located 2.5 kilometres (1.6 mi) from Josvainiai, by the Vikšrupis river, alongside the Josvainiai-Kunioniai-Kampai II road.

== Demography ==
Historical population

| Year | Pop. | ±% p.a. |
|---|---|---|
| 1902 | 132 | — |
| 1923 | 165 | +1.07% |
| 1959 | 103 | −1.30% |
| 1970 | 81 | −2.16% |

| Year | Pop. | ±% p.a. |
|---|---|---|
| 1979 | 45 | −6.32% |
| 1989 | 37 | −1.94% |
| 2001 | 41 | +0.86% |
| 2011 | 10 | −13.16% |

Source: 1902, 1923, 1959 & 1970, 1979, 1989, 2001, 2011
