= Vikšrupis =

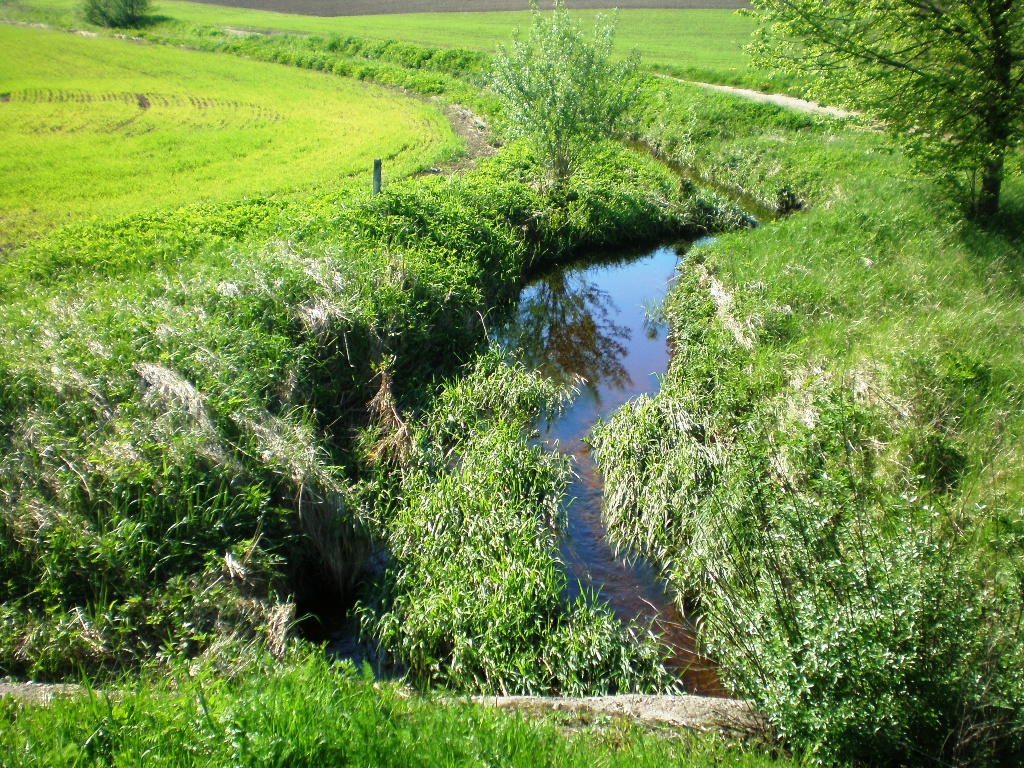
- The lower course of the Vikšrupis

Location
- Country: Lithuania
- Region: Kėdainiai district municipality, Kaunas County

Physical characteristics
- Source
  - location: Nearby Jakšiai
- Mouth: Šušvė near Macgaliai
  - coordinates: 55.2248°N 23.8445°E
- Length: 16.9 km (10.5 mi)
- Basin size: 30.4 km^{2} (11.7 sq mi)

Basin features
- Progression: Šušvė→ Nevėžis→ Neman→ Baltic Sea
- Tributaries
  - left: Gaidys

The Vikšrupis is a river of Kėdainiai district municipality, Kaunas County, central Lithuania. It flows for 16.9 kilometres (10.5 mi) and has a basin area of 30.4 km^{2} (11.7 sq mi). The river is a right tributary of the Šušvė.

It starts near Jakšiai village, then flows to the west through the Pernarava-Šaravai Forest. The lower course is designated as the Pavikšrupys Botanical Zoological Sanctuary.

The hydronym Vikšrupis is a compound noun which the first root vikšr- could mean either 'rush' (vikšris) or 'caterpillar' (vikšras) while the second root up- means 'river' (upė).
