= Alfonsas =

- Gender: Male
- Language: Lithuanian
- Name day: 23 March

Origin
- Region of origin: Lithuania

Other names
- Related names: Alphons, Alphonse, Alfonzo

Alfonsas is a Lithuanian masculine given name, derived from the Germanic Alfons meaning "noble brave". People bearing the name Alfonsas include:

- Alfonsas Andriuškevičius (born 1940), Lithuanian poet and art historian
- Alfonsas Danys (1924–2014), Lithuanian writer
- Alfonsas Dargis (1909–1996), Lithuanian painter, graphic artist, set designer and poet
- Alfonsas Eidintas (born 1952), Lithuanian historian, diplomat and novelist
- Alfonsas Petrulis (1873–1928), Lithuanian Roman Catholic priest, journalist and signatory to the Act of Independence of Lithuania
- Alfonsas Žalys (1929–2006), Lithuanian politician
