= Grinkiškis =

- town
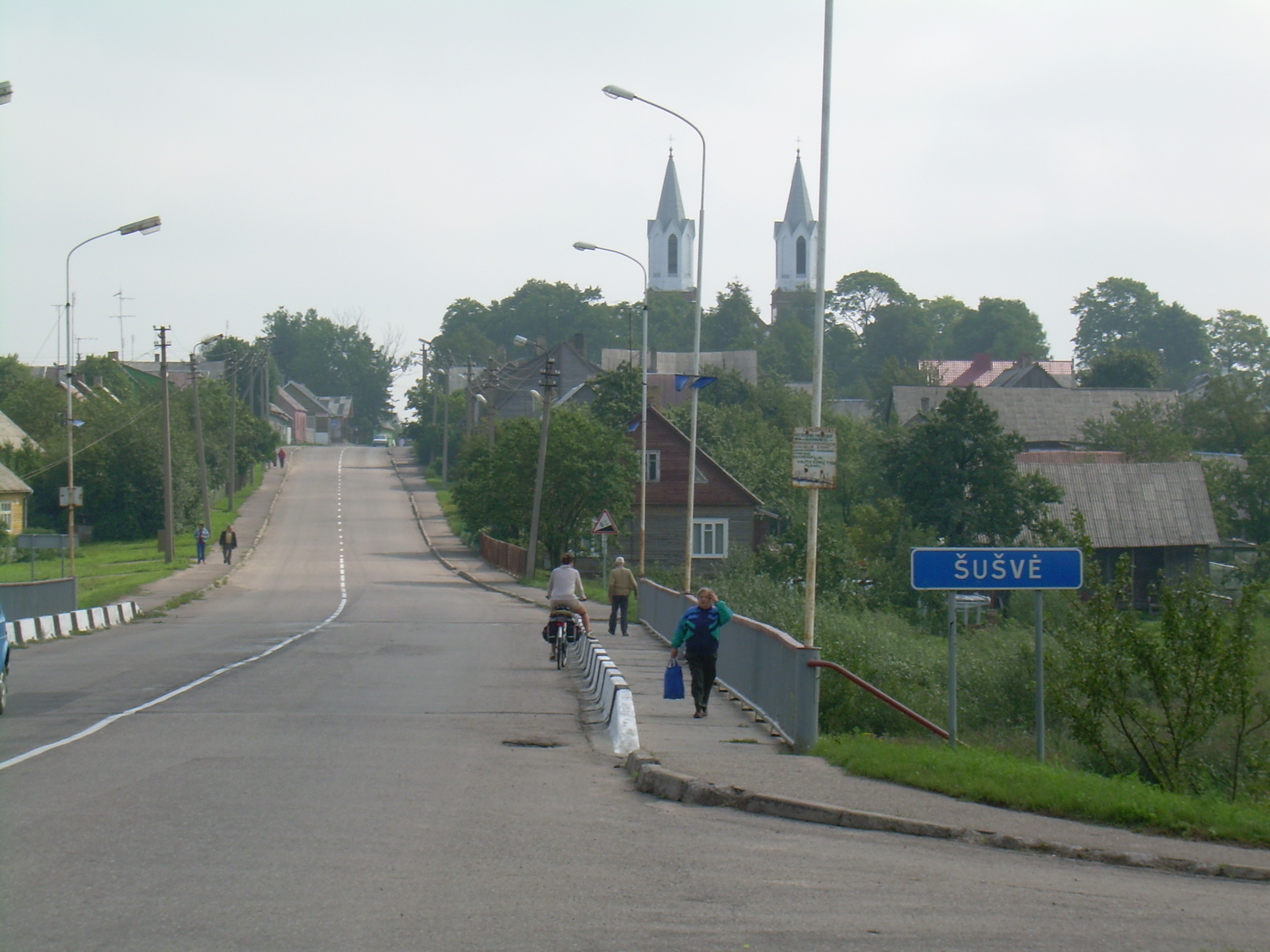

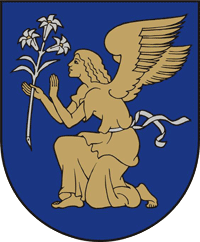
- Coat of arms

- Location of Grinkiškis
- Coordinates: 55°33′20″N 23°38′00″E
- Country: Lithuania
- Ethnographic region: Aukštaitija
- County: Šiauliai County
- Municipality: Radviliškis District Municipality
- Eldership: Grinkiškis Eldership
- Capital of: Grinkiškis Eldership

Population (2011)
  - Total: 678
- Time zone: UTC+2 (EET)
  - Summer (DST): UTC+3 (EEST)

Grinkiškis (Polish: Grynkiszki, Yiddish: גרינקישאָק, Grinkishok) is a town in the Radviliškis District Municipality in Šiauliai County, Lithuania. It is situated on the Šušvė River. It is the seat of an eldership. According to the 2021 census, the town had a population of 550.

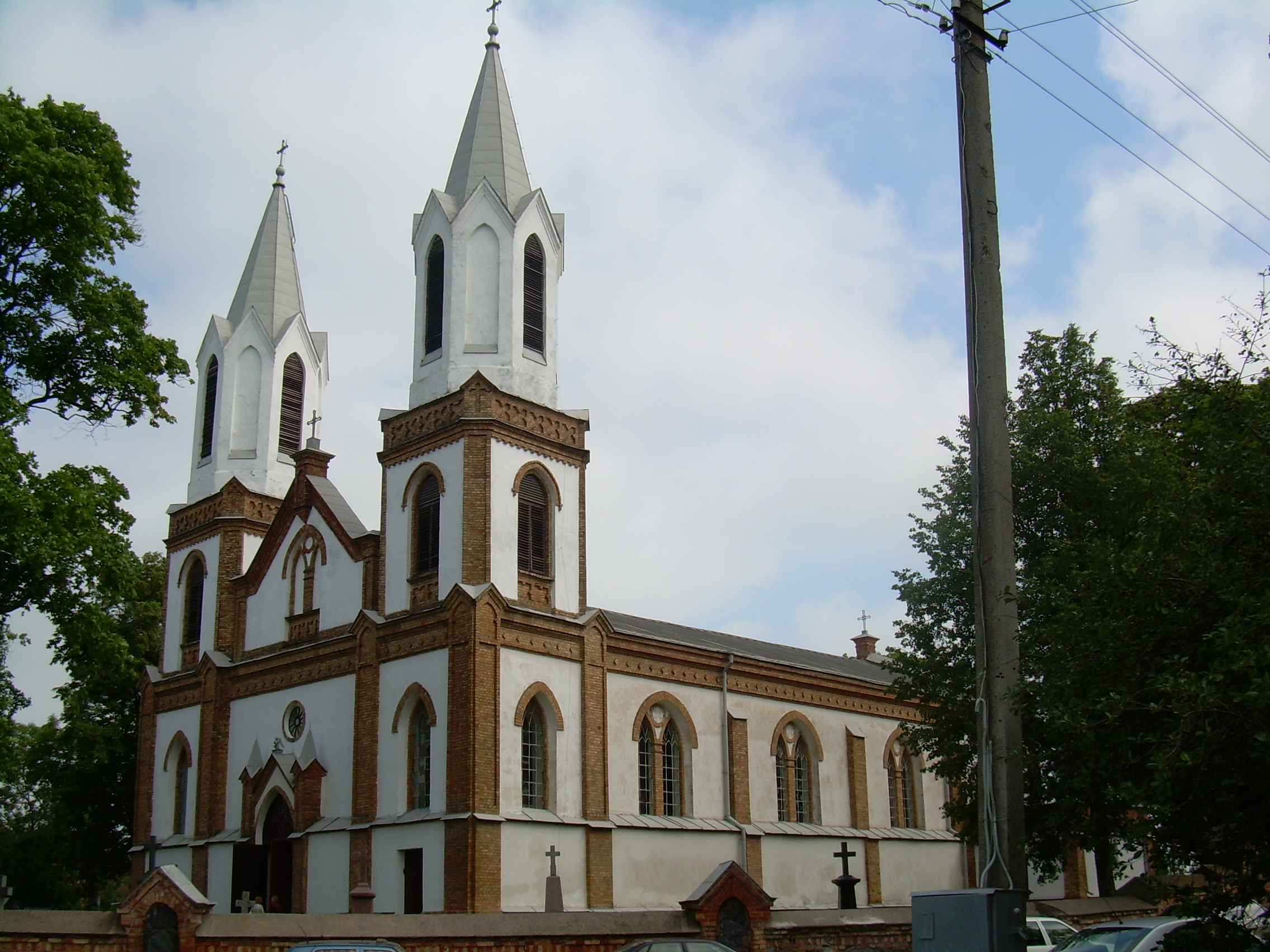
Church in Grinkiškis

The town was first mentioned in 1454 and soon became property of the Gatavičius family. Krzysztof Gatavičius, thankful for his military achievements, built a church in 1618. The present church was built in 1875.

In 1999, the coat of arms of Grinkiškis were approved by a presidential decree. The coat of arms depict a golden angel on one knee, who holds a silver lily with three blooms. The angel was borrowed from one of the two surviving crosses in town's cemetery, made by 19th-century dievdirbys Vincas Svirskis. The lily, a symbol of purity and innocence, represents Blessed Virgin Mary – patron of the town and namesake of its church.
