= Danys =

Danys is a Lithuanian surname. Notable people with the surname include:

- Alfonsas Danys (1924–2014), Lithuanian writer
- Juozas Vincent Danys (1914–2005), Lithuanian and Canadian hydrotechnical engineer, professor
- Jurgis Danys (1921–2016), Lithuanian physician and therapist, habilitated doctor of biomedical sciences
- Robertas Danys (1963–2008), Lithuanian poet and songwriter
