= Vincas Svirskis =

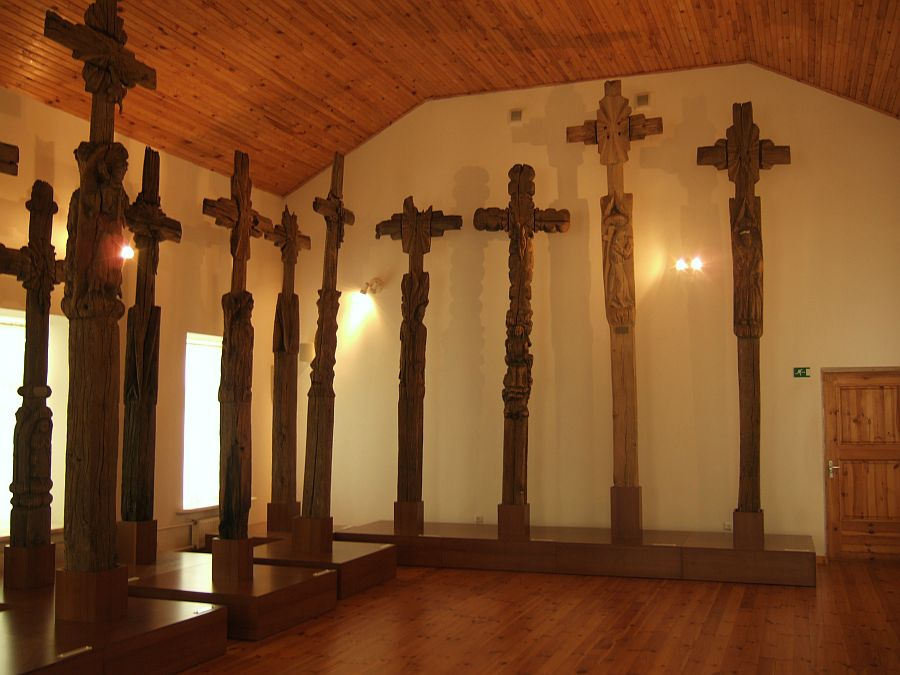
Crosses of Svirsikis in the Kėdainiai Museum of Crosses, Kėdainiai, Lithuania

Vincas Svirskis (January 28, 1835 — March 7, 1916) was the most prominent Lithuanian folk sculptor and wood carver, known for his works in Lithuanian cross crafting, god-carving and roofed pole carving.
