= Alfonsas Danys =

Lithuanian writer (1924–2014)

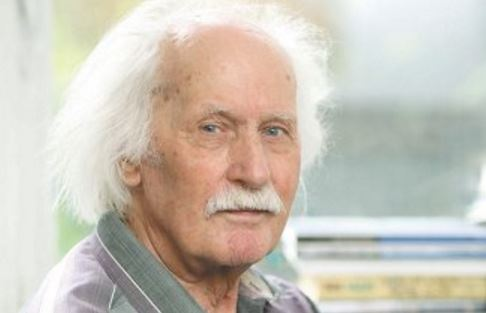

Personal details
- Born: 16 September 1924 Trumpiškiai , Rokiškis district, Lithuania
- Died: 2014 (aged 89–90) Vilnius, Lithuania
- Resting place: Saltoniškių kapinės
- Citizenship: Lithuanian
- Spouse: Birutė Danienė
- Children: 1
- Education: Vytautas Magnus University
- Profession: Novelist, prose writer
- Nickname: 1

Alfonsas Danys (16 September 1924 – 2014) was a Lithuanian writer known for satire works, detective fiction and novels about a rural life, Interwar, World War II and the Soviet Lithuania.

== Early life and education ==
Danys was born to a Lithuanian family of farmers in 1924 in Trumpiškiai, Rokiškis, Lithuania. He was raised in a family of five children. Danys studied at Rokiškis gymnasium. His first employment was a teacher’s job at Pakriauniai elementary school. Due to the deportation of teachers to Siberia that had begun, he had to leave his native village. In 1946, he moved to Kaunas to study at the Lithuanian University of Health Sciences. In 1947, he moved to Vilnius to study law.

Danys has begun his career as an assistant editor of government news at the Lithuanian branch of the Supreme Soviet of the Soviet Union. Later he worked as a chief editor and translator at the Presidium of the Supreme Soviet.

== Writing career ==
Danys wrote his first book ("Saldaus Gyvenimo Klampynėse") after a work experience at the confectionery factory. The theme of the book was the impact of communism on human mentality and how thefts became a norm in society. Danys started to write satires and feuilletons when he worked at the Supreme Soviet of the Soviet Union. He wrote under a pseudonym "Banys". Since 1961, satires were published by Šluota and other magazines.

In 1982, "Pergalė" magazine published parts of a satire novel "Rūkytas Kumpis" where Danys wrote about the Soviet government in a humorous tone.

== Works ==
The most popular works of Danys are the series of four novels that talk about the Interwar, World War II and Postwar periods. The books were inspired by a resistance among intellectuals and artists to adapt their ideas to the ideology of the communism during the Soviet occupation.

"Sutryptų Vilčių Aimana" is the first book in the series. The novel covers the events during the German occupation of Lithuania during the World War II including the Holocaust in Lithuania. The novel was originally written in 1970, published in 1998.

"Kruvina Puota" is the second book in the series. The novel was inspired by true facts and Lithuanian partisans which Danys got to know about during his work as a rural teacher. The novel shows a reality of a guerrilla warfare that was on between civilians and the Soviet occupants in 1944-1953. The novel was originally written in 1970-1975, published in 1997.

"Užkasti Akmenys" is the third book in the series. The novel talks about a cruel process of taking a land away from people and establishing kolkhozes and state farms in the Soviet Lithuania. The novel was originally written in 1977, published in 2003.

"Skaudūs Praeities Sopuliai" is the last book in the series. The novel shows life several generations after the war. The novel was originally written in 1984-1986, published in 2001.

== Other works ==
The novel "Saldus gyvenimas" ("The Sweet Life") is the first book written by Danys. The story is happening during the first years of the post-World War II when communism started to establish in Lithuania. The core theme of the novel is an internal conflict and an attempt of young people to find a right choice for life in the new Soviet Lithuania. The novel was written in 1955 and published in 2009.

The novel "Žemės Trauka" talks about conflicting worldviews between descendants from wealthy families. The core theme of the book is a connection with nature and a mother land. The novel was written in 1983-1987, published in 2004.

The novel "Rasoti Takai" talks about events during the Interwar period (1918–1938) when Lithuania was an independent country and when a land was respected and highly appreciated. The novel was published in 2006.

== Awards ==
The novel "Kraujo Lašas Auskaruose" won a prize from "Lietuvos Šaulių Sąjunga" in 1993. The novel "Kelionė į Nebūtį" won the same prize from "Lietuvos Šaulių Sąjunga" in 1995.

The novel "Žemės Trauka" won fourth place in the competition run by the emigrants newspaper "Lietuvių Balsas" in 2001.

== Legacy ==
In 2000, Danys built a cross "In the memory of Daniai family" in his native land at Trumpiškiai where it used to be a family house. In 2014, in the same location at Trumpiškiai, his grandson Žilvinas Danys has started to create a Lithuanian ethnographic architecture park with the traditional type of sculptures called Roofed pole (Lithuanian "stogastulpis") The park is dedicated to a Danys and his brother doctor Jurgis Danys. Coordinates of the historical memorial park: XVPM+78 Mažosios architektūros (stogastulpių) parkas, Trumpiškiai, 42204 Rokiškio r. sav.

In the village of Trumpiškiai, on the site of his family’s farmstead, the writer Alfonsas Danys erected a cross in 2000 ‘in memory of the Danys family’.

== Bibliography ==
- Danys, Alfonsas (1978). "Visiems Užteks": Satire. – Vilnius: Vaga."
- — (1993)."Kruvinas Akordas": Detective Fiction. – Kaunas: Europa.
- — (1993). "Kraujo Lašas Auskaruose": Detective Fiction Story. – Kaunas: Europa.
- — (1994). "Nuodų Taurė": Detective Fiction Story. – Kaunas: Europa.
- — (1995). "Kelionė į Nebūtį": Novel. – Vilnius: Žiburys.
- — (1996). "Vaišės Prieš Mirtį": Detective Fiction Story. – Vilnius: Pradai.
- — (1997). "Krypuojantis Vežimas": Satire. – Vilnius: Rotas.
- — (1997). "Kruvina Puota": Novel. – Vilnius: Horizontas.
- — (1998). "Sava Kišenė Ne Svetima": Satire Story. – Vilnius: Rotas.
- — (1998). "Sutryptų Vilčių Aimana": Novel. – Vilnius: Horizontas."The lament of shattered hopes"
- — (1999). "Rūkytas Kumpis": Satire Novel. – Vilnius: Rotas.
- — (1999). "Šūvių Aidai Gūdumoje": Detective Fiction Story. – Vilnius: Rotas.
- — (2001). "Skaudūs Praeities Sopuliai": Novel. – Vilnius: Rotas.
- — (2003). "Užkasti Akmenys": Novel. – Vilnius: Baltijos Spaudos ir Prekybos B-vės Sp.
- — (2004). "Žemės Trauka": Novel. – Vilnius: Trys Žvaigždutės: Pasaulinės Lietuvių Vaikų Literatūros Asociacija "Lietuviška Vaikų Knyga".
- — (2005). "Jupiteris Žemėje": Novel. – Vilnius: Trys Žvaigždutės.
- — (2006). "Rasoti Takai": Novel. – Vilnius: Trys Žvaigždutės.
- — (2009). "Saldaus Gyvenimo Klampynėse": Novel. – Vilnius: Petro Ofsetas.
- — (2013). "Dvikovos Pinklėse": Novel. – Kaunas: Diremta.
- — (2014). "Brydė Rytmetyje": Novel. – Kaunas: Diremta.
