= Ethiopian cross =

Representative cross for Ethiopian and Eritrean Orthodox church

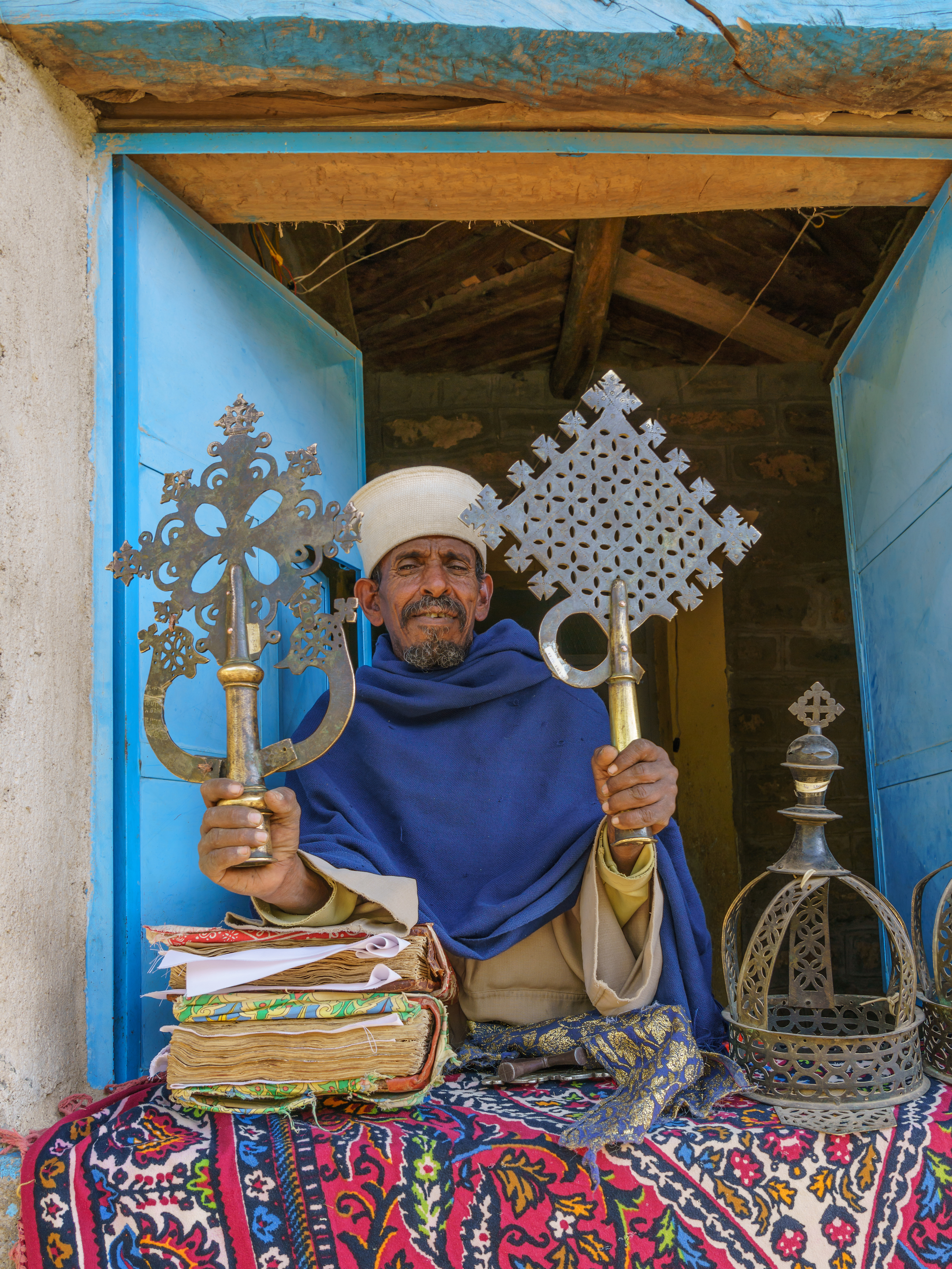
An Ethiopian Orthodox priest with traditional Axumite crosses

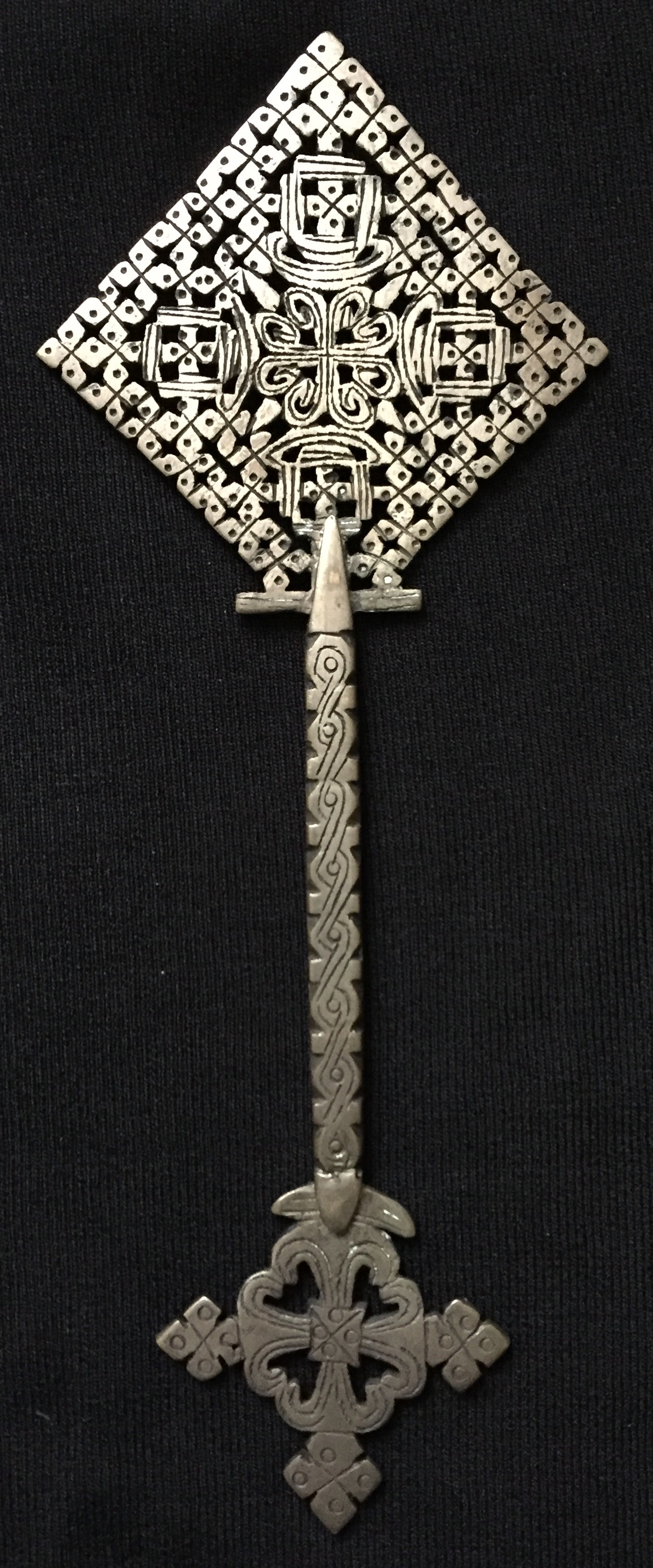
Ethiopian, brass, latticework, blessing cross.

Ethiopian crosses, Abyssinian crosses, or Ethiopian-Eritrean crosses are a grouping of Christian cross variants that are symbols of Christianity in Ethiopia, Eritrea, and among Ethiopians and Eritreans. Their elaborate, stylized design is markedly distinct from other Christian cross variants. Ethiopian crosses are almost always made from elaborate latticework, the intertwined lattice represents everlasting life. No two crosses are exactly identical in style, the artisans who make them being allowed the freedom to exercise a measure of individual taste and creativity in their choice of shape and pattern. Crosses may be of the processional type with a socket at the base so they may be mounted on a staff and carried in church ceremonies or hand-held blessing crosses used by priests in benedictions.

== Gallery ==
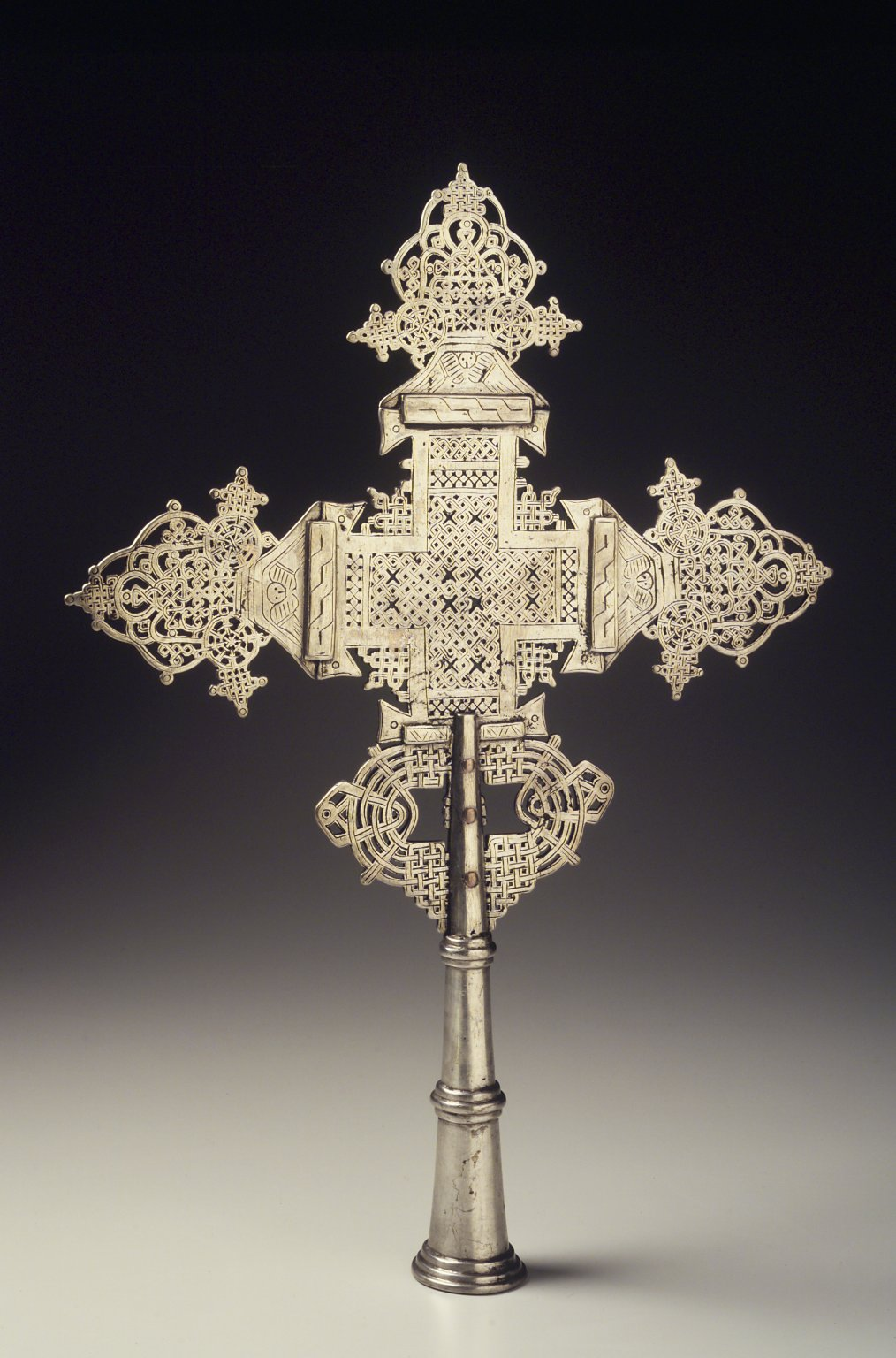
Brass, latticework processional cross (socketed for staff) from Amhara Region, mid 20th century.

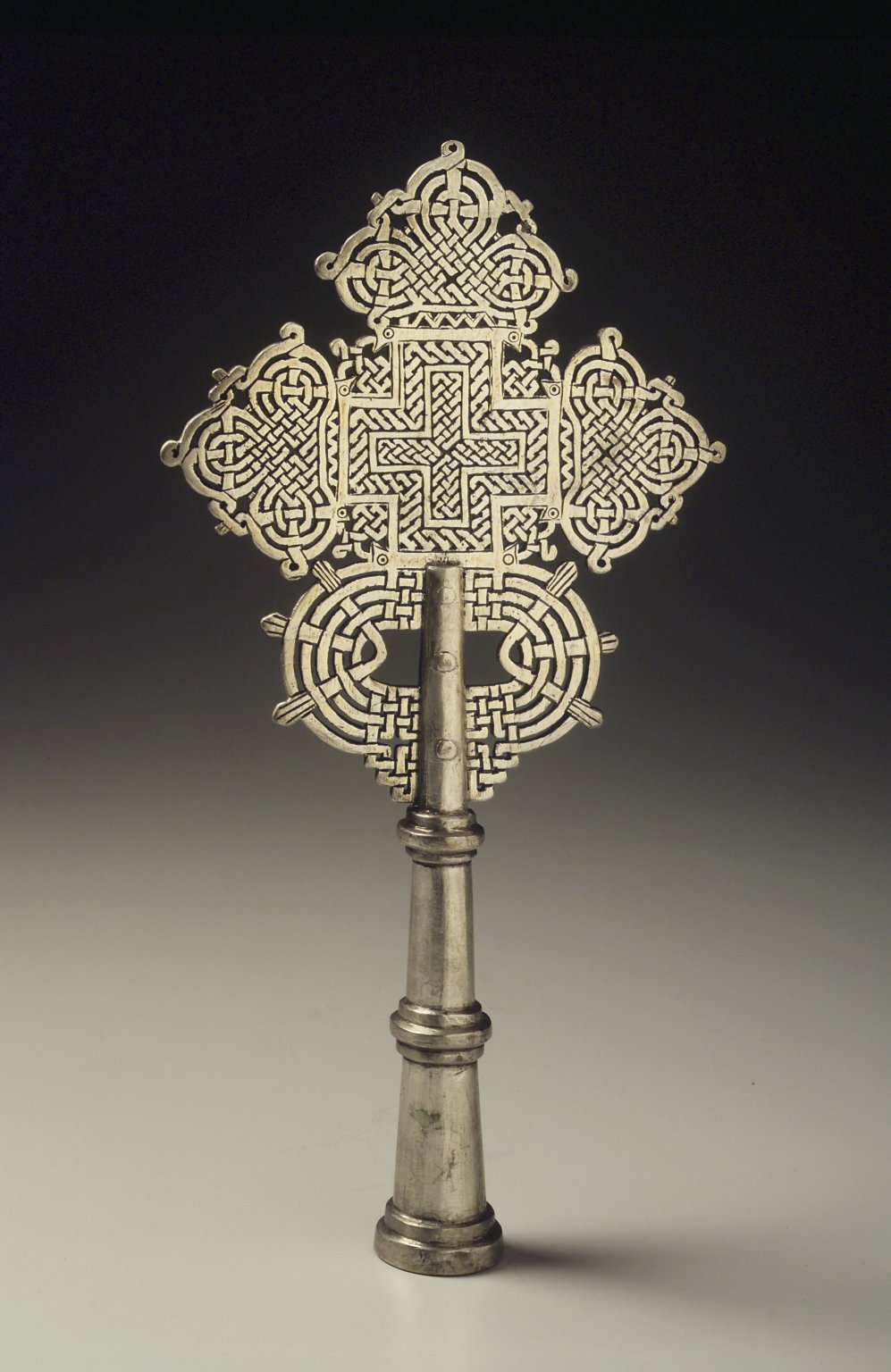
Brass, latticework processional cross (socketed for staff) latticework reminiscent of Celtic knot-work, Amhara Region, mid 20th century.

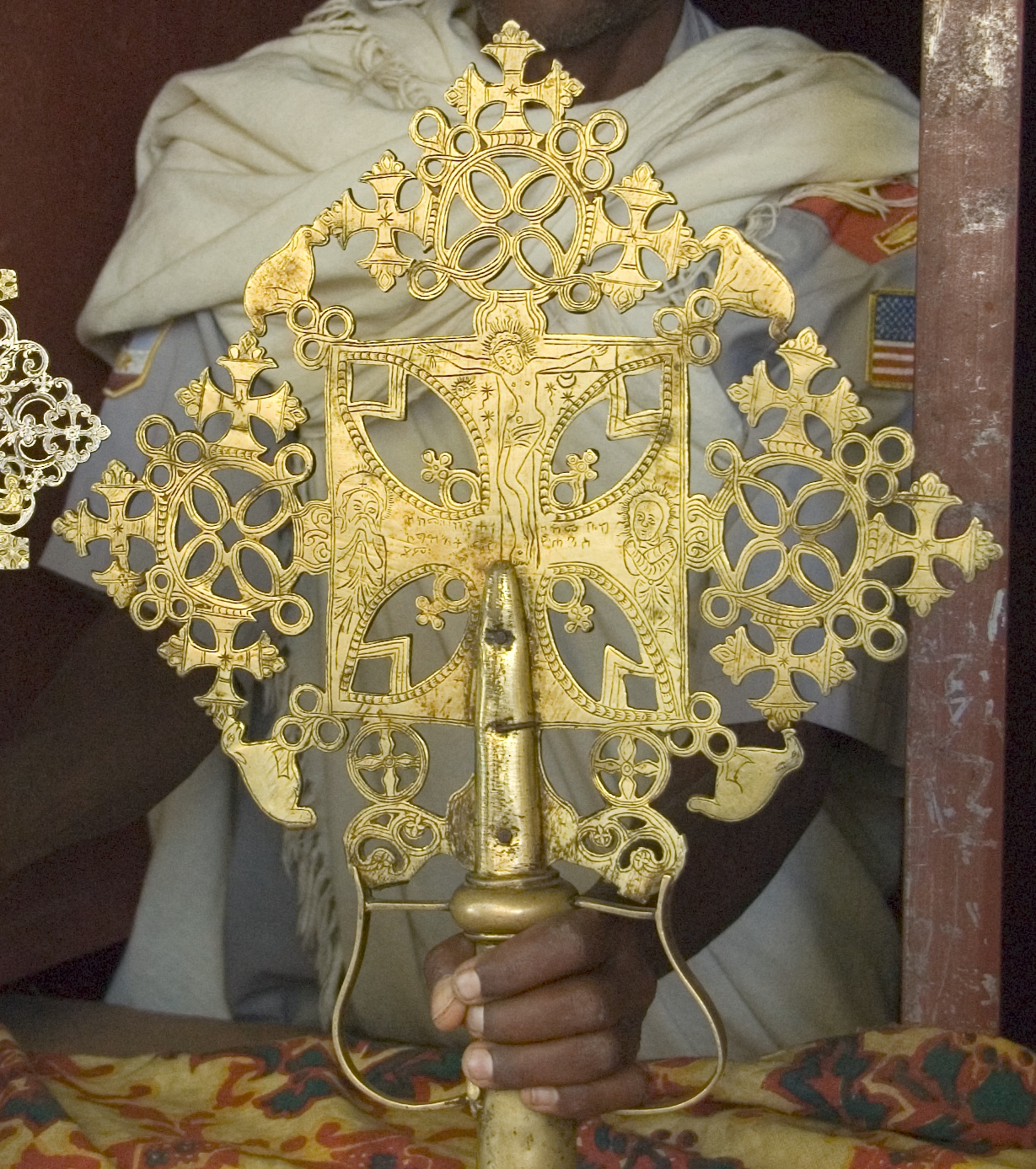
Processional cross (socketed for staff) more open and figurative style ( less abstract than previous examples ).

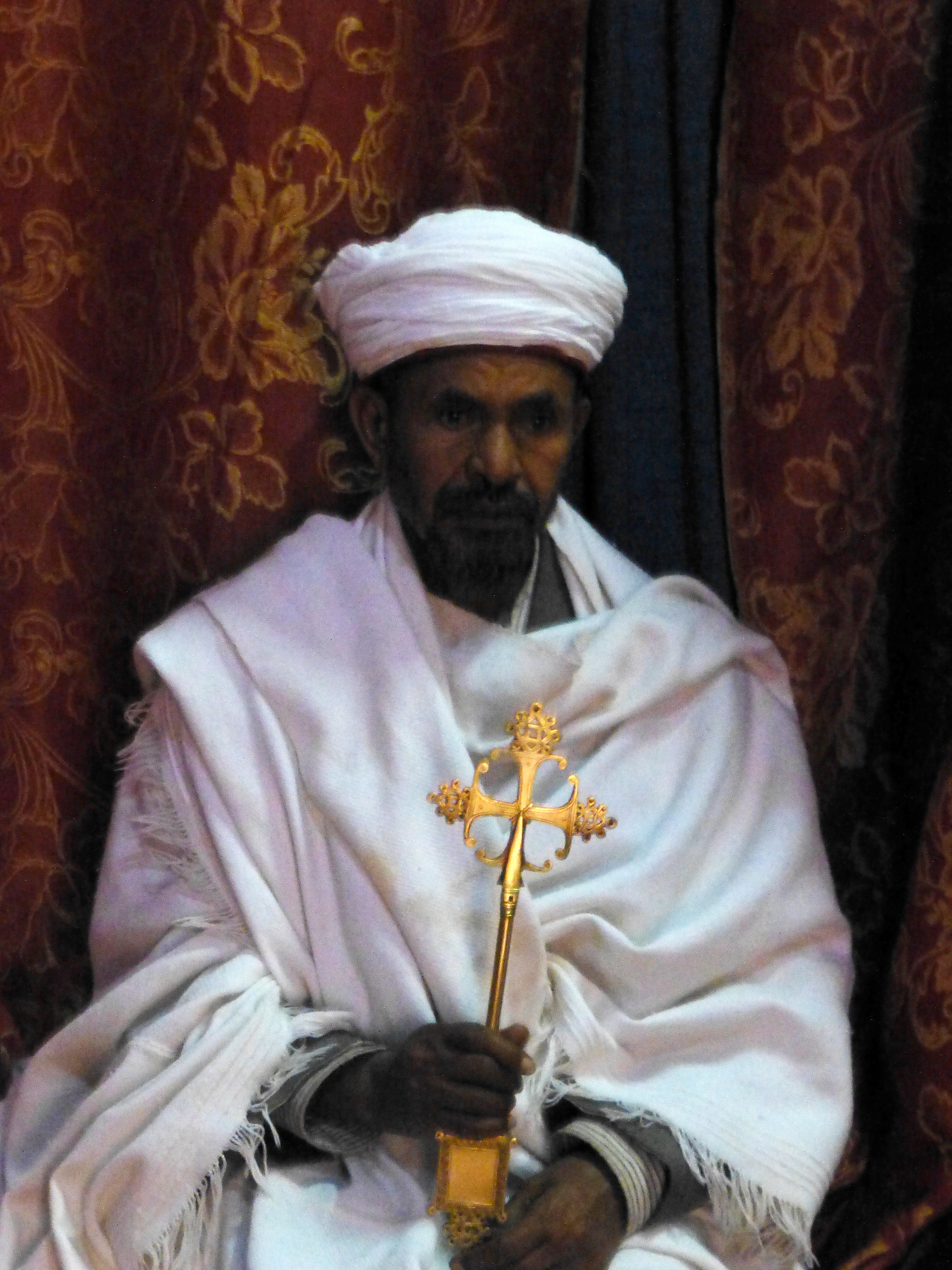
Ethiopian Orthodox priest holding golden blessing cross, Church of St. George, Lalibela, Ethiopia.

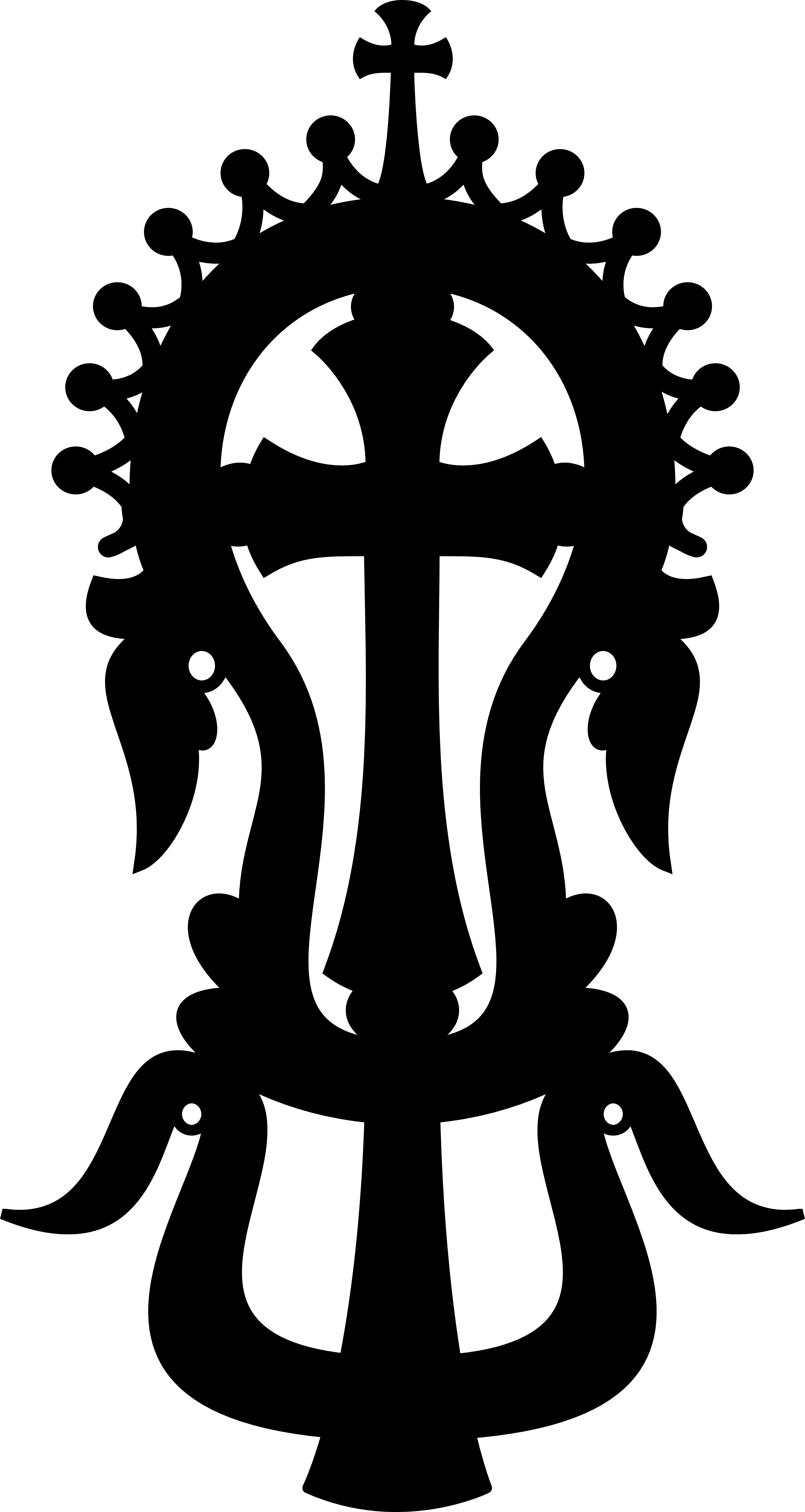
Lalibela's cross

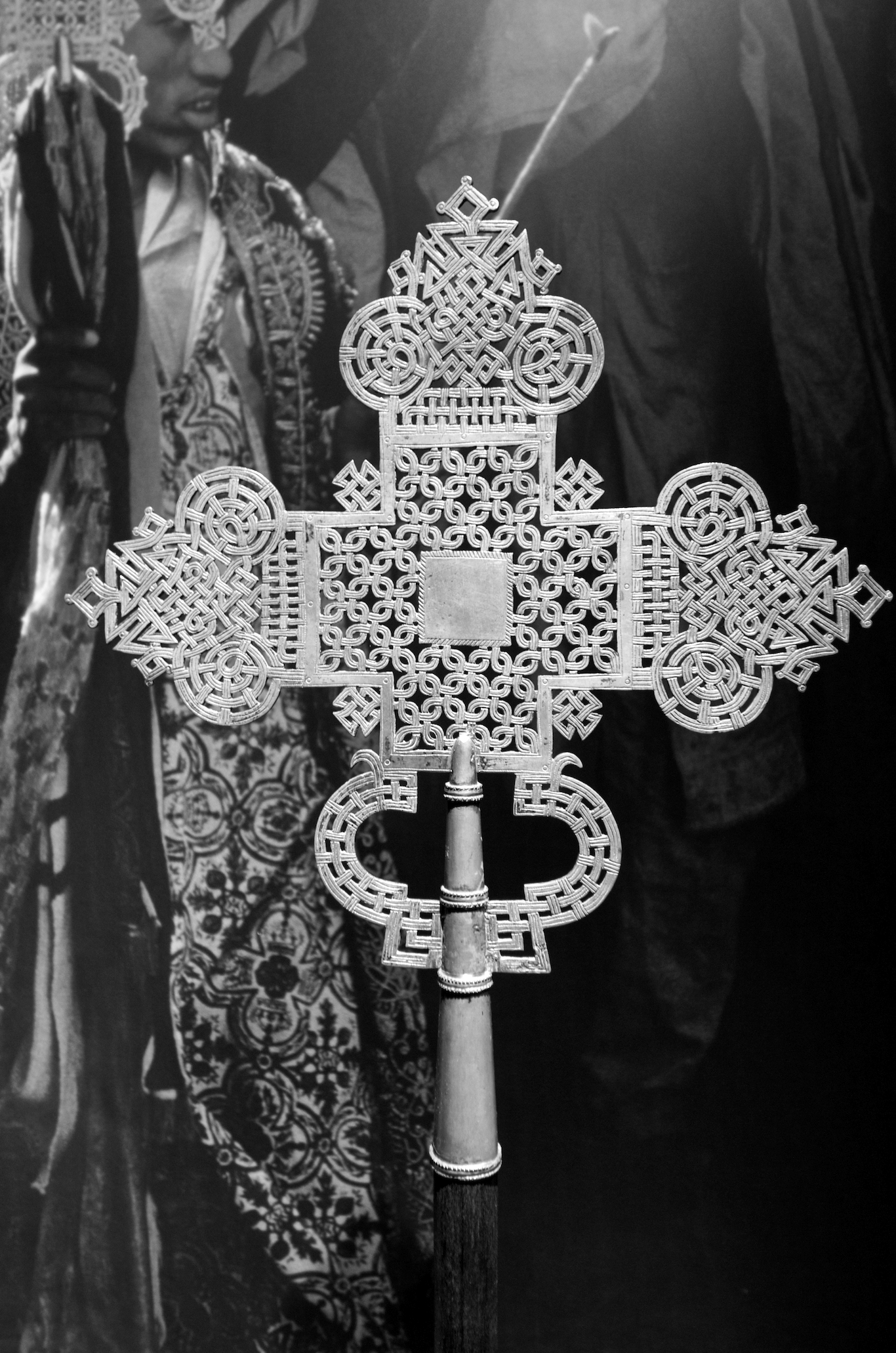
Christian cross from Ethiopia

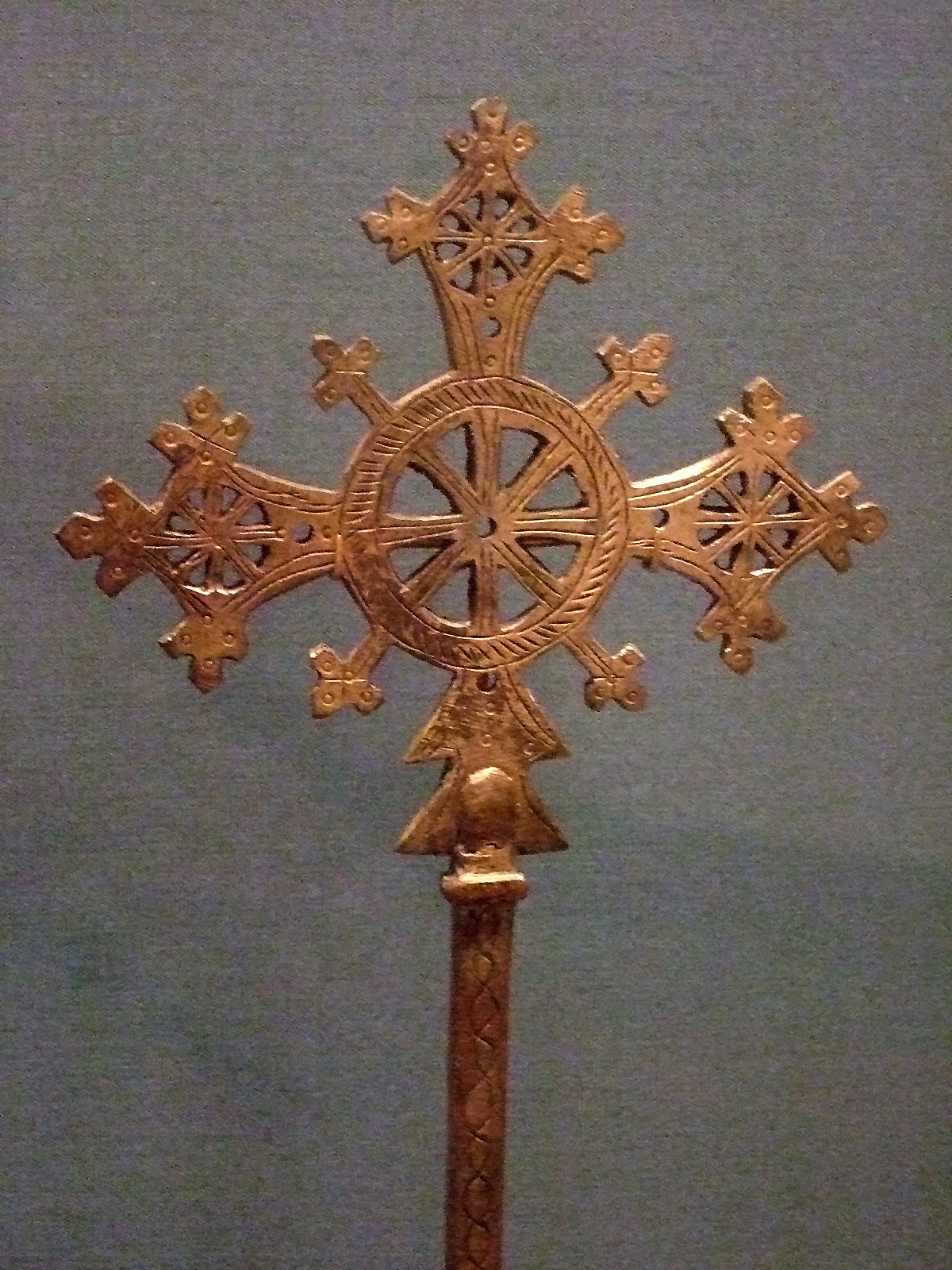
Ethiopian handheld crosses, 18th-20th century, brass silver and wood, Dallas Museum of Art

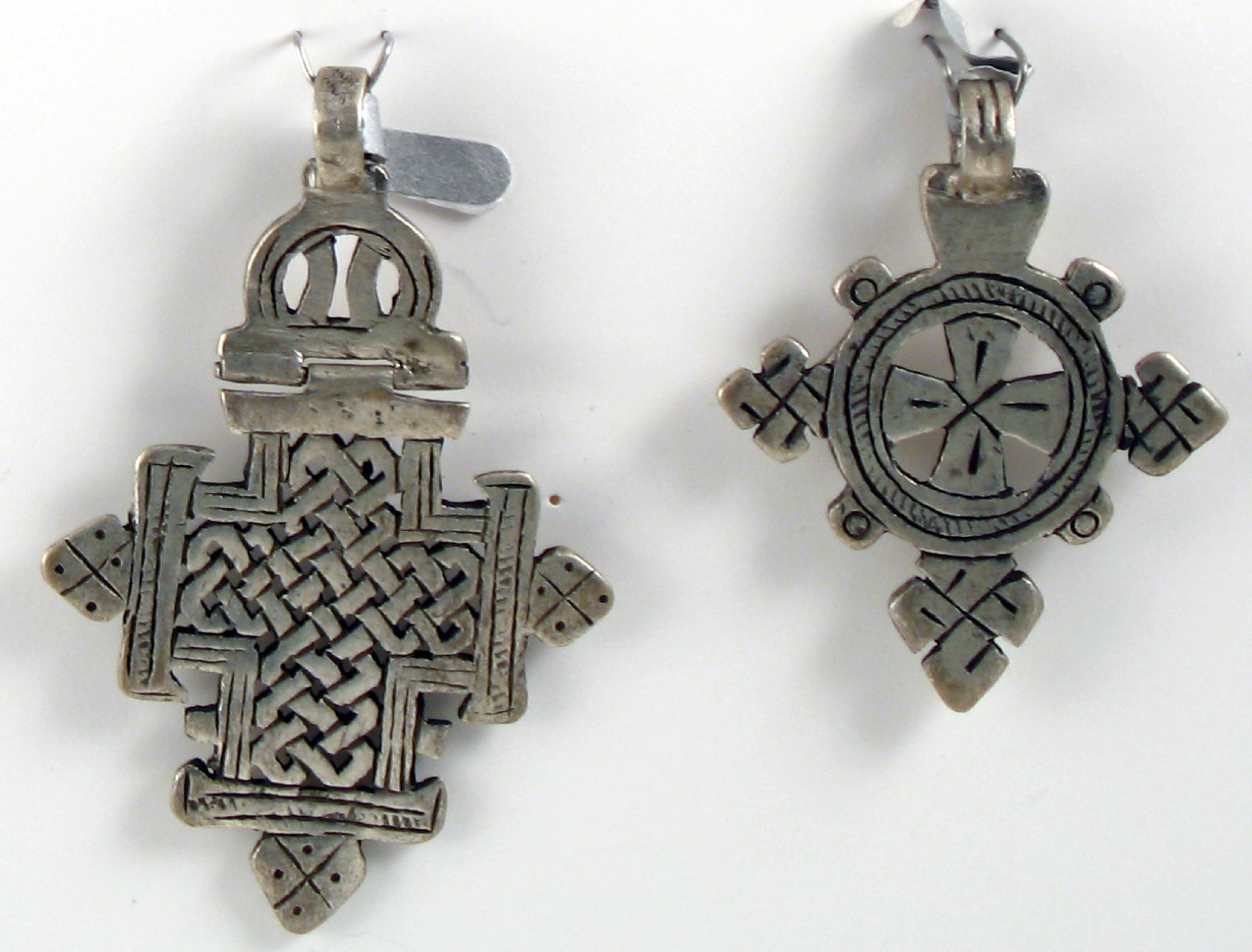
"Tribal Silver Coptic Cross, Ethiopia." Photo by Ann Porteus from Tasmania, Australia.

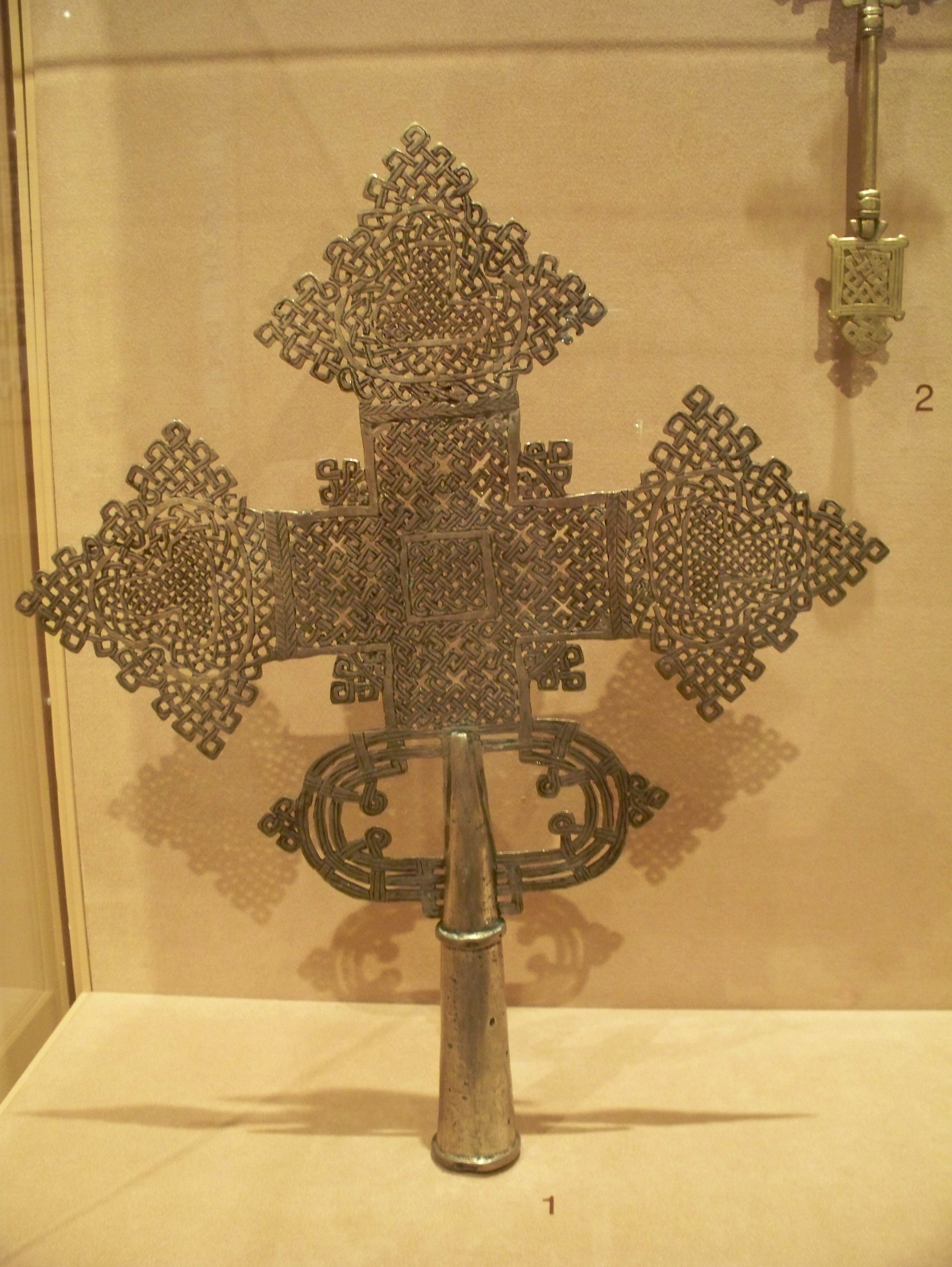
Ethiopian Processional Christian Cross.

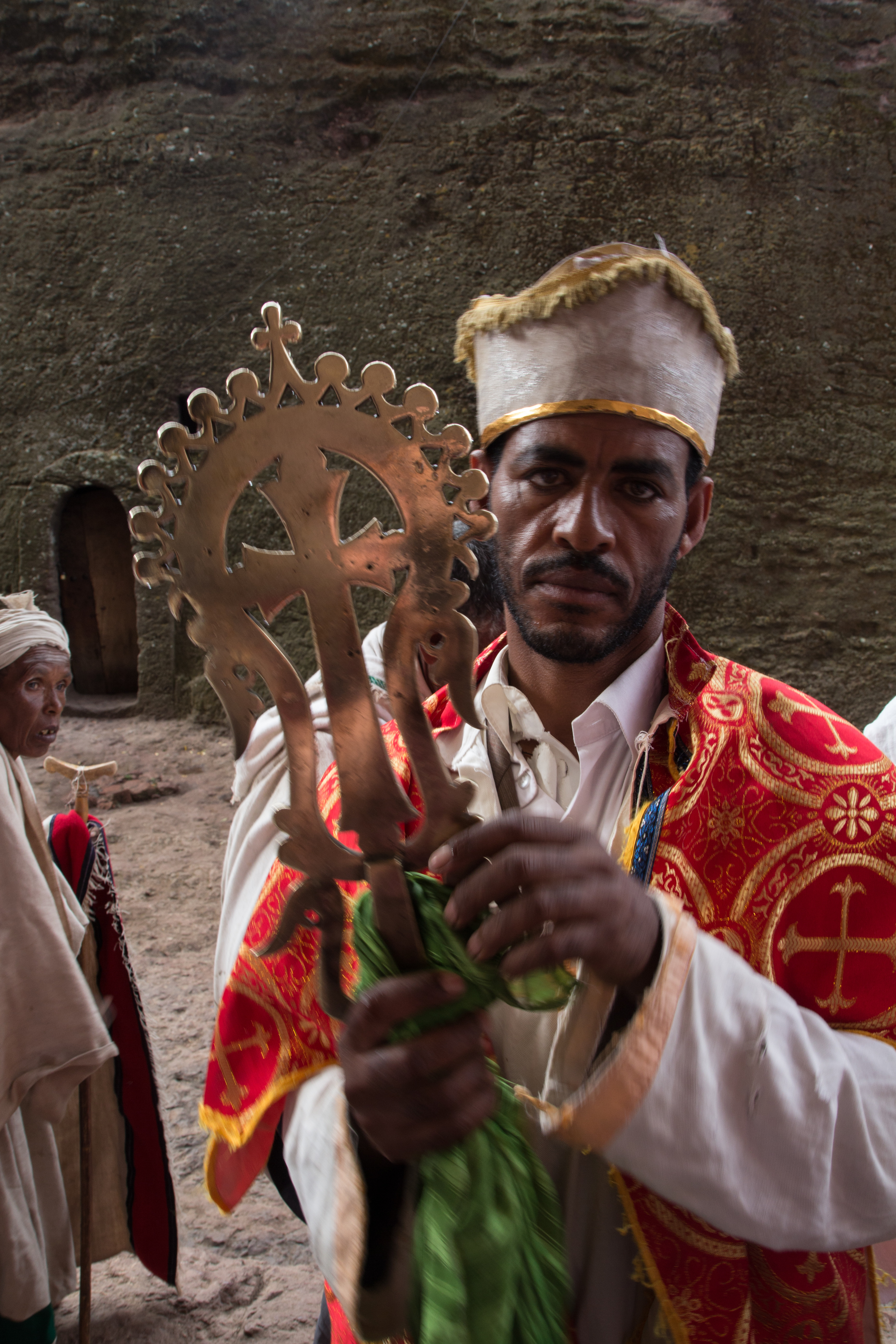
A priest stands with the Lalibela Cross after blessing Sunday worshippers.

== See also ==
- Lalibela Cross
- Lithuanian cross crafting
- Coptic cross
- Khachkars, Armenian cross stones
- Celtic crosses
- mequamia
