= Lithuanian cross crafting =

Lithuanian folk art tradition

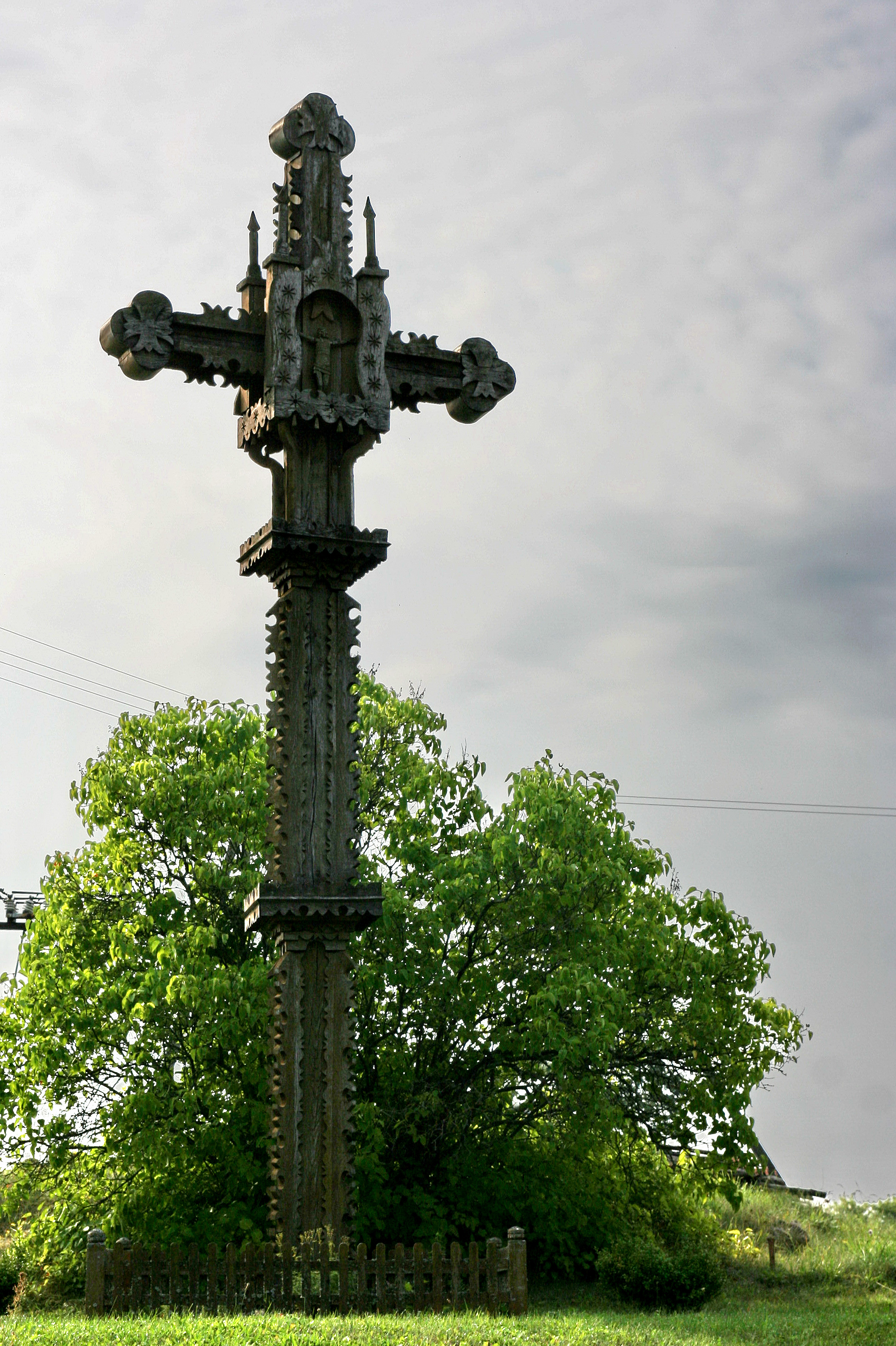
A memorial cross in Lithuania

Lithuanian cross crafting (Lithuanian: Lietuvos kryždirbystė) is a traditional Lithuanian art of crafting crosses. The making of altars and crosses is an important part of Lithuanian culture. Lithuanian traditional crosses are part of the people's Roman Catholic religion. Approximately since Lithuania became a part of the Russian Empire in the 19th century, these crosses have become a symbol of the Lithuanian people.

The crosses are intricately carved of oak wood, and sometimes incorporate iron elements as well. Their craftsmen, known as kryždirbiai, travel across the country. The most renowned Lithuanian cross crafter and god carver was the self-taught Vincas Svirskis (1835–1916), whose crosses, once seen across central Lithuania, are now kept in national museums.

Lithuanian cross crafting has been included in the list of Masterpieces of the Oral and Intangible Heritage of Humanity of 2001 by UNESCO. Also In 2017 Cross-crafting and its symbolism in Lithuania was inscribed into The Intangible Cultural Heritage Inventory of Lithuania as a form of folk art, traditional craftsmanship or agricultural activities. Intricate cross crafting of wood, stone or metal, as well as elaborate jewelry crosses is known in other cultures as well. Examples are Celtic crosses, Ethiopian crosses and Armenian crosses.

== History and traditional form ==
Cross crafting as a form of folk art emerged introducing Christianity in Lithuania, therefore, it combined motifs of Christian Religious art and motifs of Baltic mythology. Tradition, formed in the 15th century, is not only linked to craftsmanship itself, but includes the ritual of erecting the cross (searching for mercy or protection, in honor of the deceased, God or saints, etc.) – the search and choice of the cross-crafter, the creative process of cross-crafting, erection, consecration, visitations to crosses, chanting and other related ceremonies, the burning of a collapsed monument as well. Tradition encompasses both the Christianity (monuments are built in cemeteries, villages and towns) and the archaic human relationship to nature (the monuments are built near sacred water springs or sources, sacred stones or hung on sacred trees). The stylized crosses, Lietuviškasis kryžius, are put up along roadsides, in cemeteries, near houses and as votive offerings in churches. The crosses combine elements of architecture, sculpture, blacksmith art, and painting. One to five meters high, they often feature floral or geometric symbols, motifs of the sun, birds and the tree of life; they are sometimes adorned with small statues. To plead for grace or to express gratitude, the crosses are built as memorials to the dead or as the signs of spiritual protection at certain places. Even today crosses are built to mark the places of former settlements or farmsteads, places of death by homicide or accident, in memory of deceased people or groups of people, significant events and anniversaries, as protection for road travelers and adornment of sacred sites. The Hill of Crosses holds a large collection of the pieces. The sculptural appearance wary according to particular region, an alternative being a traditional chapel-pole (i. e. "koplytstulpis" – a pole with one or multiple roofed small chapels with a sacred statuettes usually arranged in different level one above the other, the smallest on the top). In Dzūkija ethnographic region crosses are adorned with wreaths, flowers, ribbons and aprons. In Samogitia statuettes of Virgin Mary are enrobed and adorned with necklaces. More than 200 cross-craftsmen in Lithuania are active today.

== Gallery ==
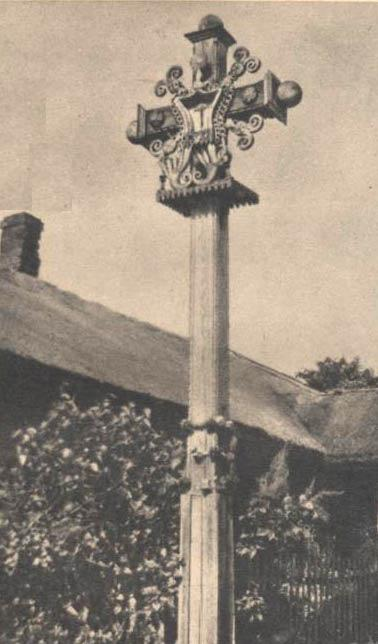

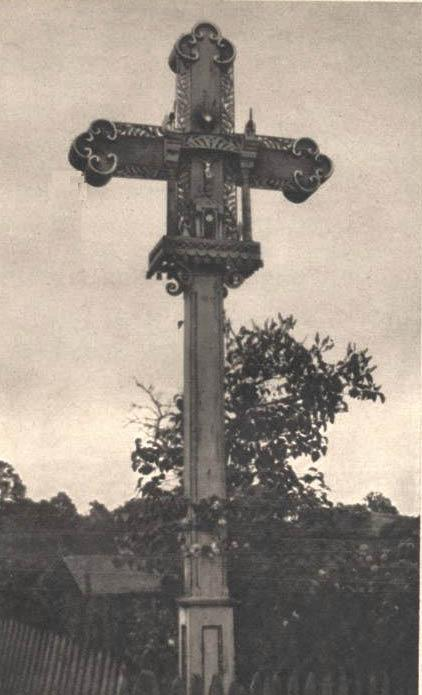

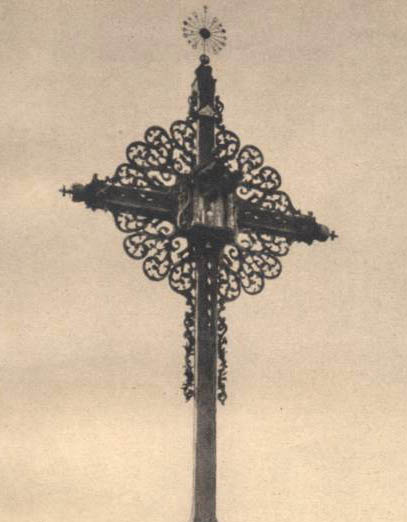

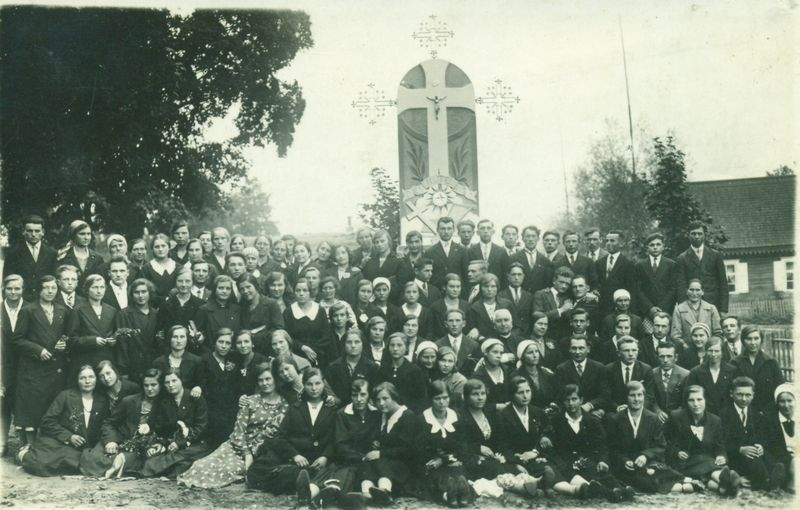
Lithuanian Riflemen's Union Monument in Šimonys, Lithuania, 1928, gathered besides traditional Lithuanian cross

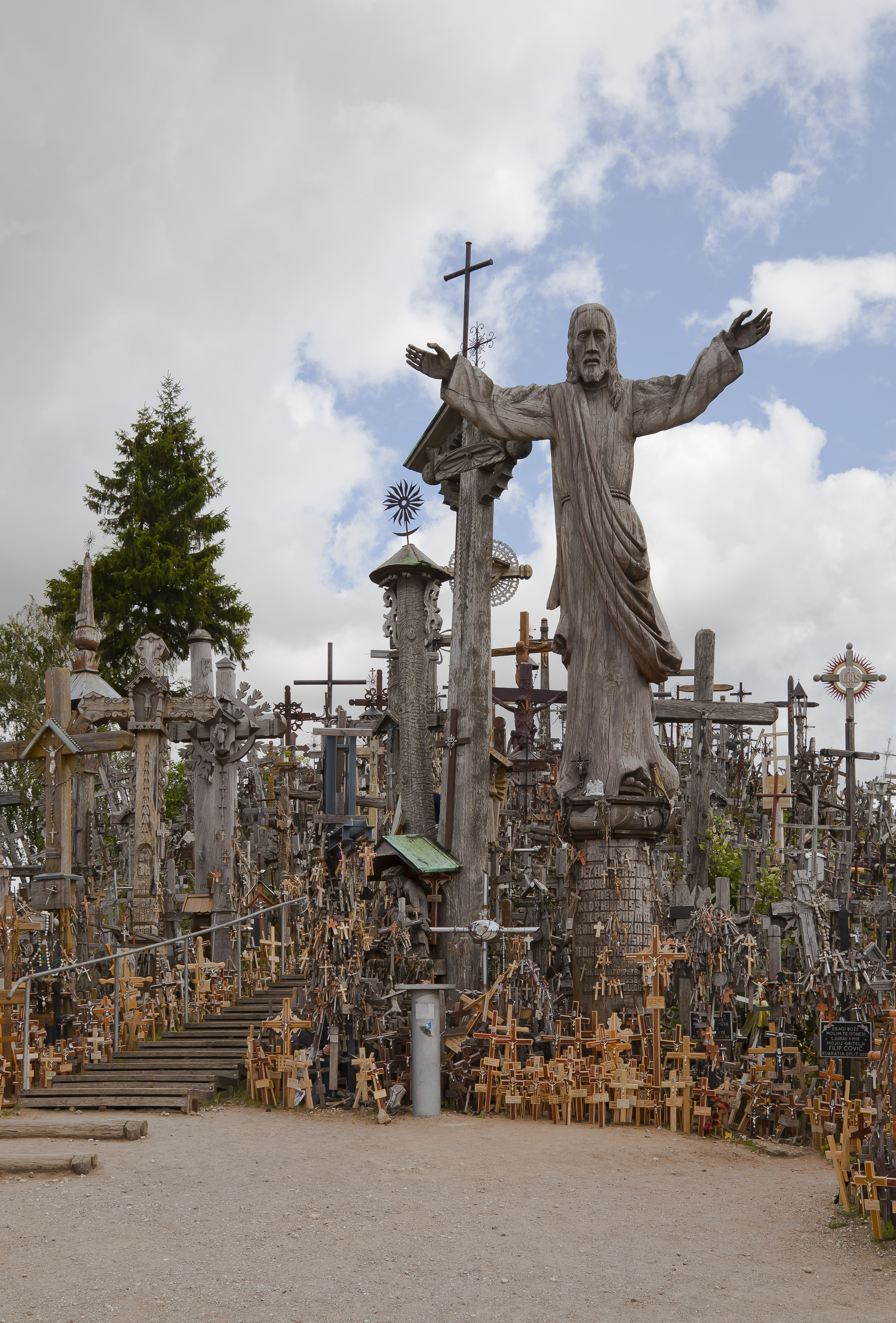
The Hill of Crosses

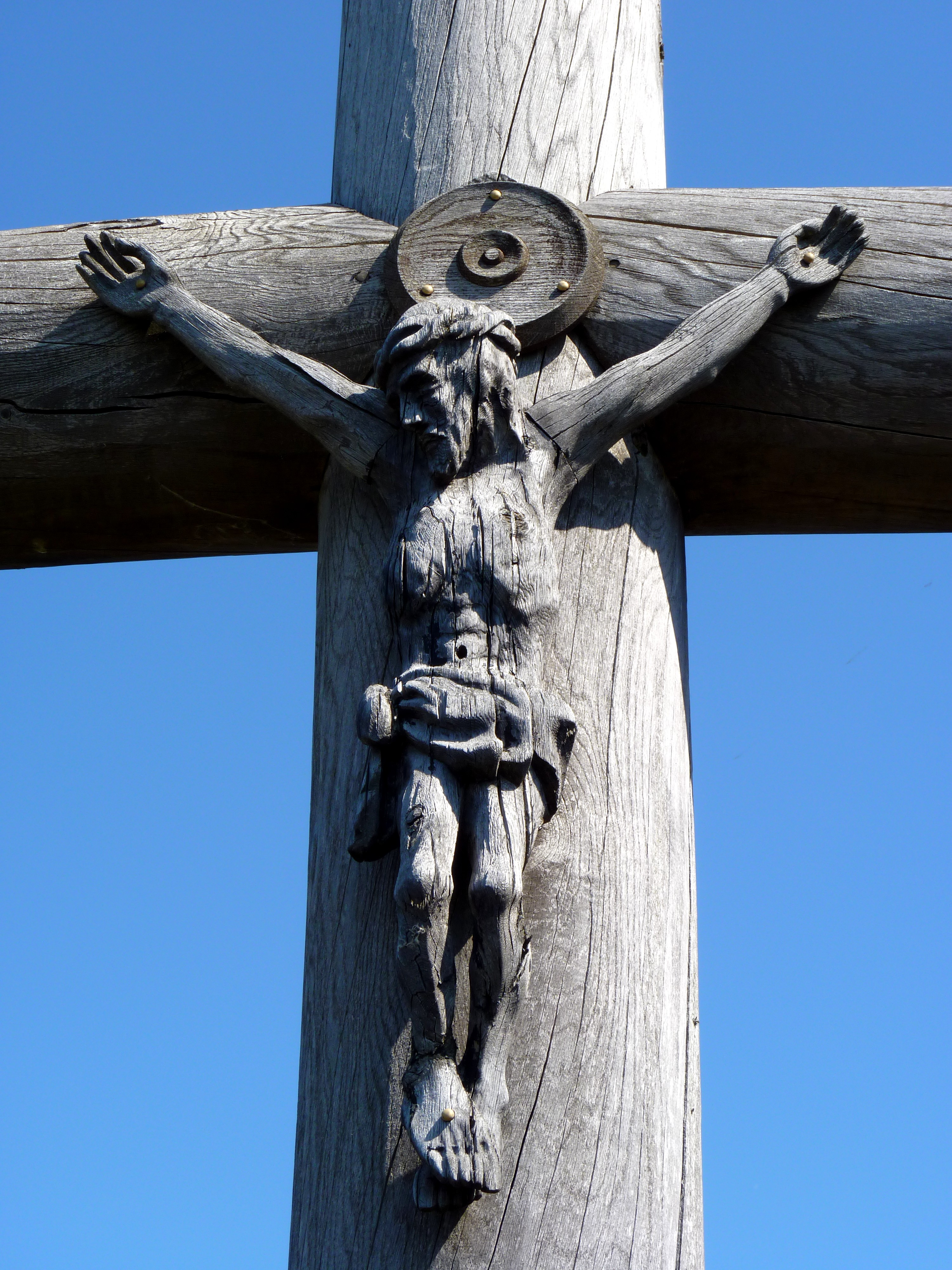
Wooden crucifix on the Hill of Crosses

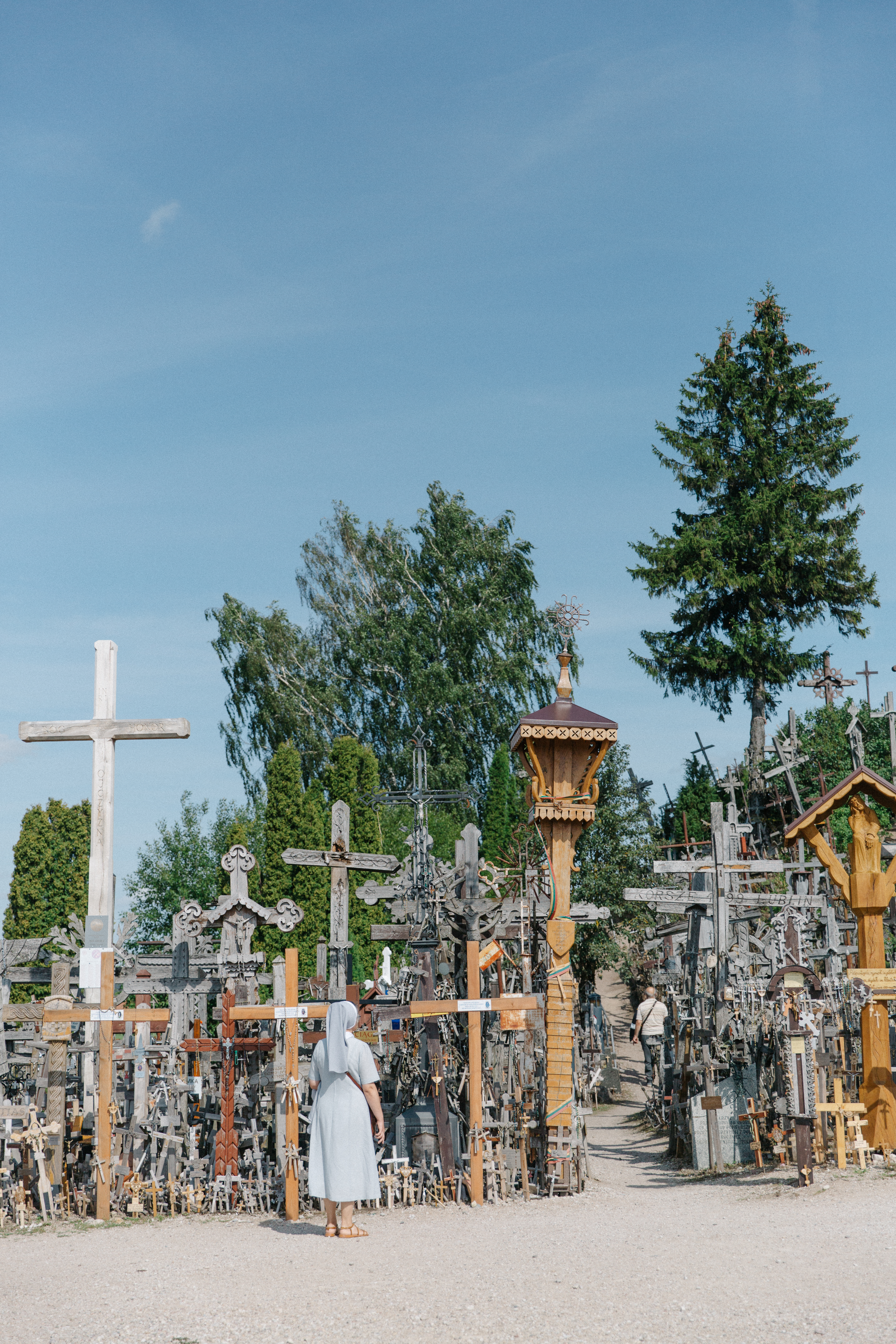
The Hill of Crosses

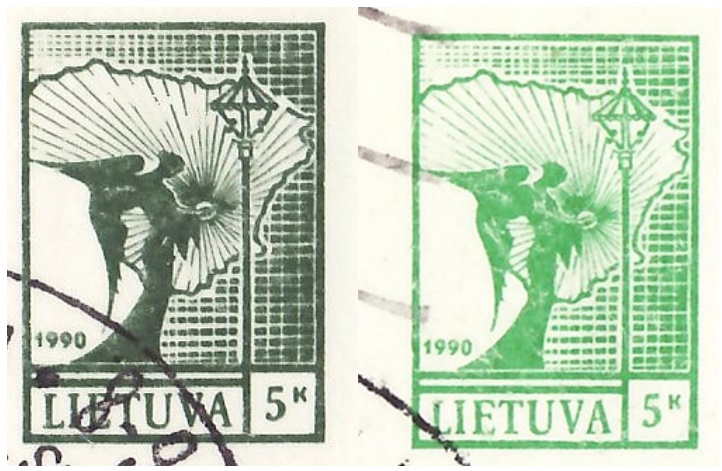
1990 postage stamp, showing and angel and a traditional Lithuanian wayside shrine

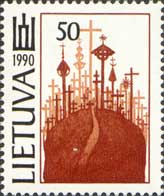
1991 postage stamp, commemorating the Lithuanian Cross-crafting and its symbolism

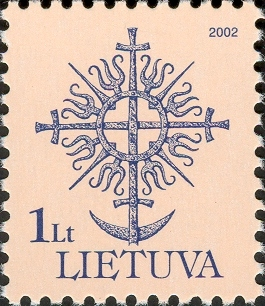
2002 postage stamp, commemorating the Lithuanian Cross-crafting and its symbolism

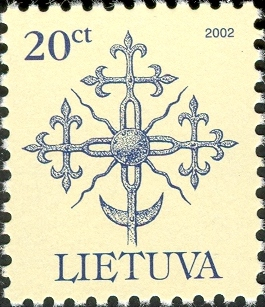
2002 postage stamp, commemorating the Lithuanian Cross-crafting and its symbolism

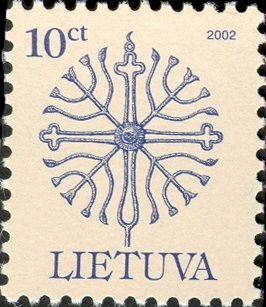
2002 postage stamp, commemorating the Lithuanian Cross-crafting and its symbolism

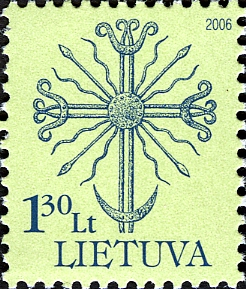
2006 postage stamp, commemorating the Lithuanian Cross-crafting and its symbolism

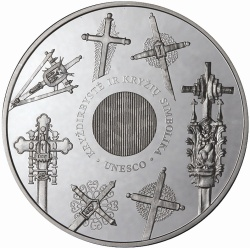
50 litas coin issued for participation in the Silver Coin programme “Europe. European Cultural Heritage”

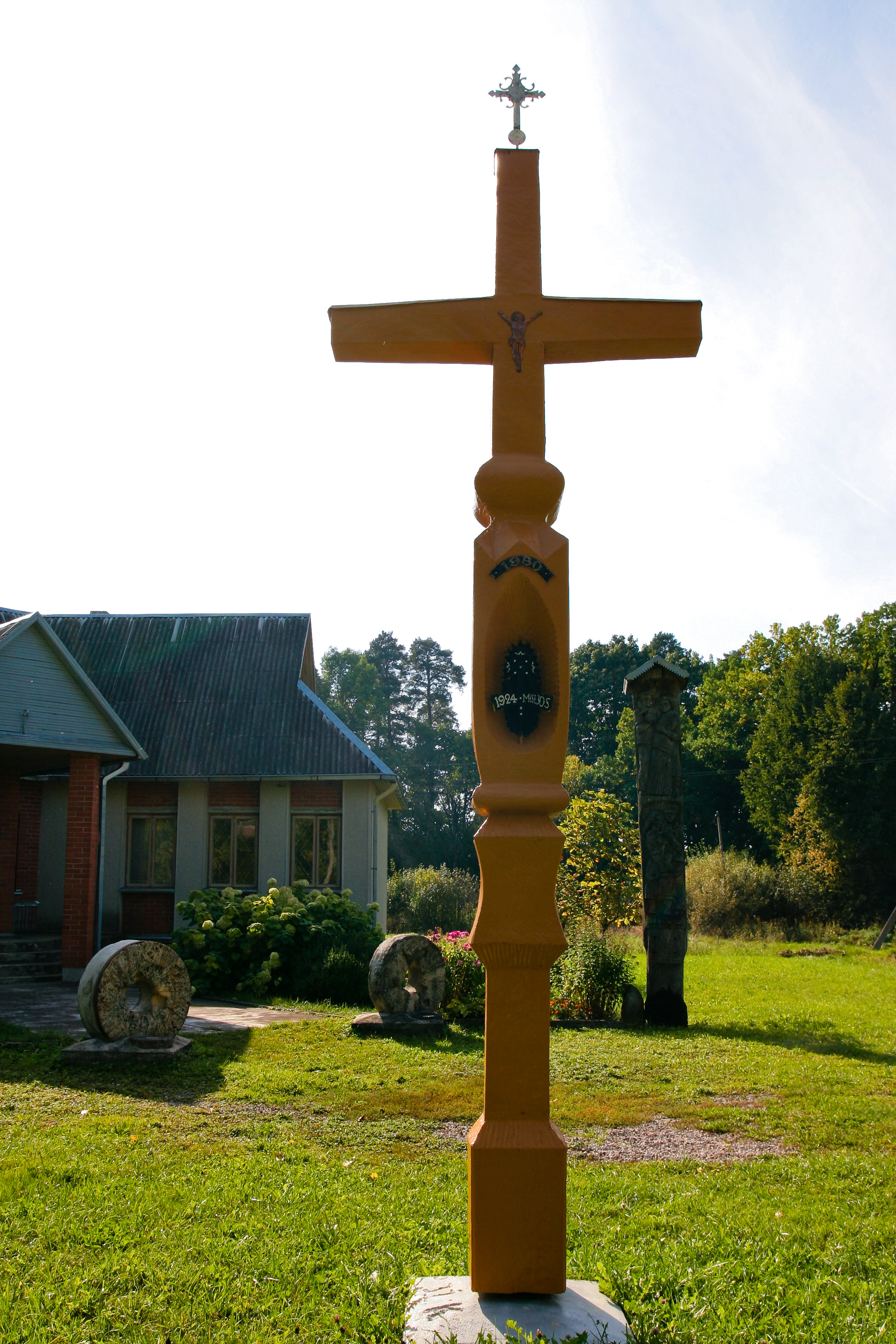
Traditional cross in Vepriai

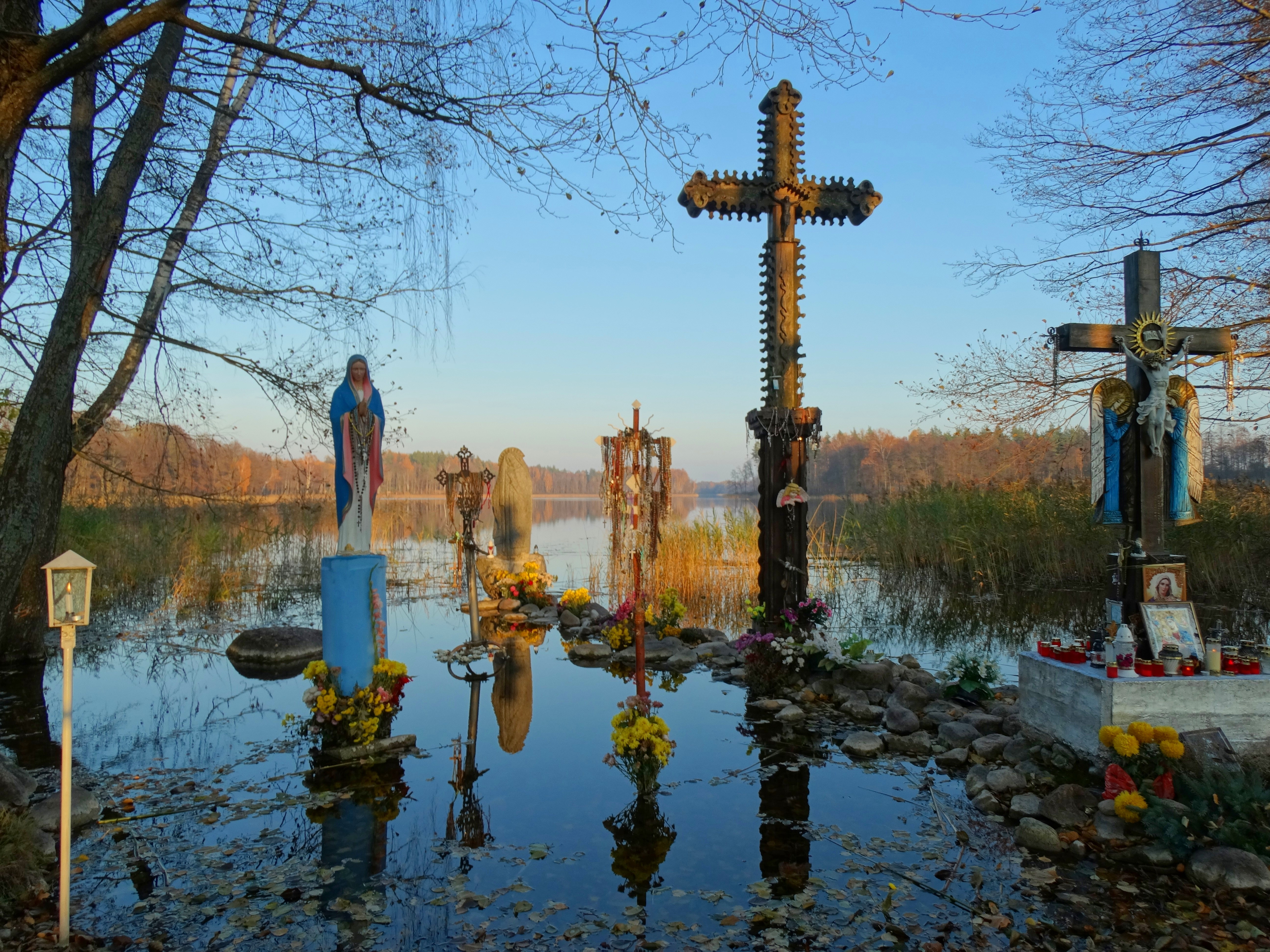
Kvintiškės, crosses by chapel, Zarasai district, Lithuania

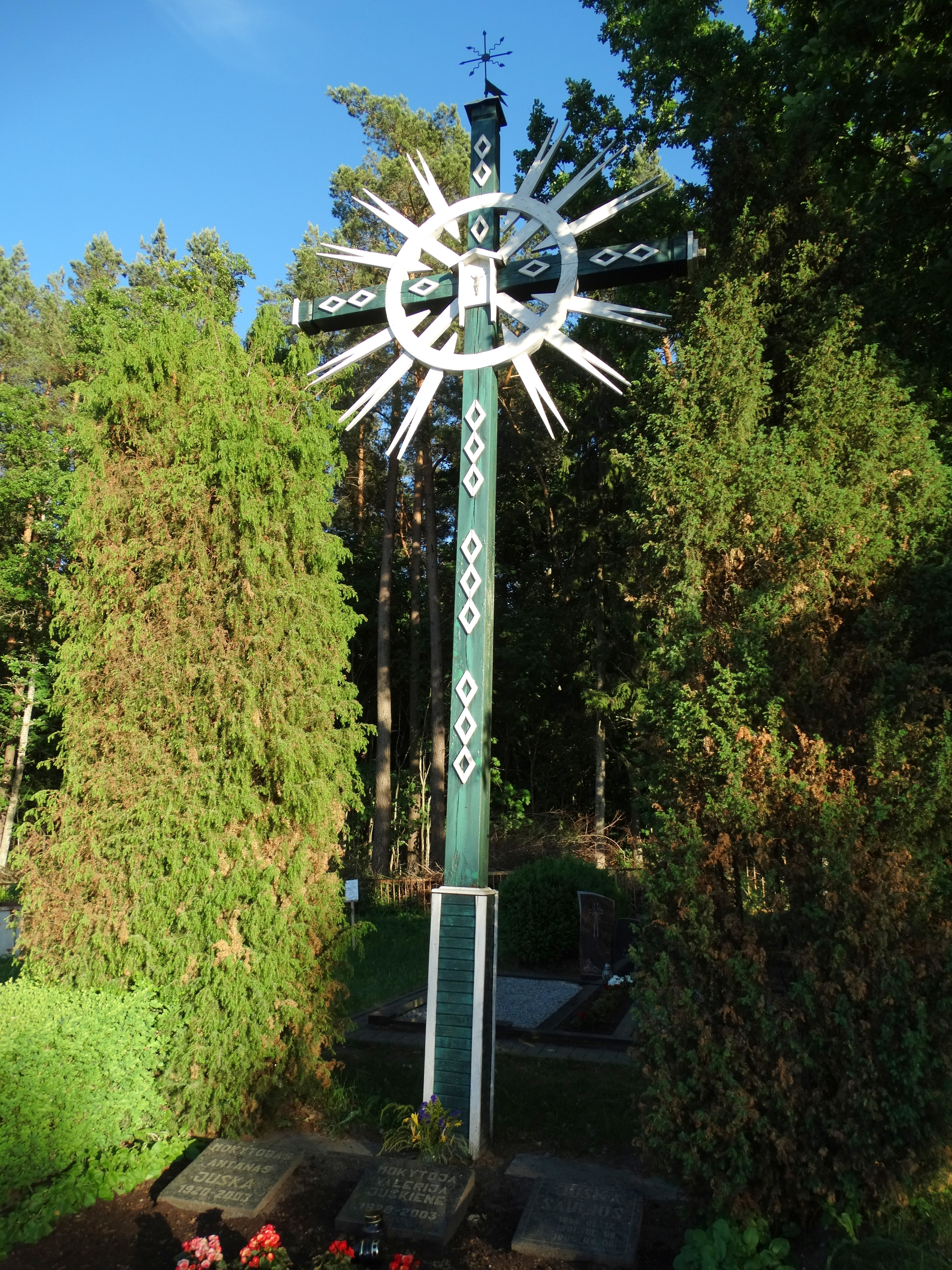
Cemetery in Pilkalnis, Raseiniai district, Lithuania

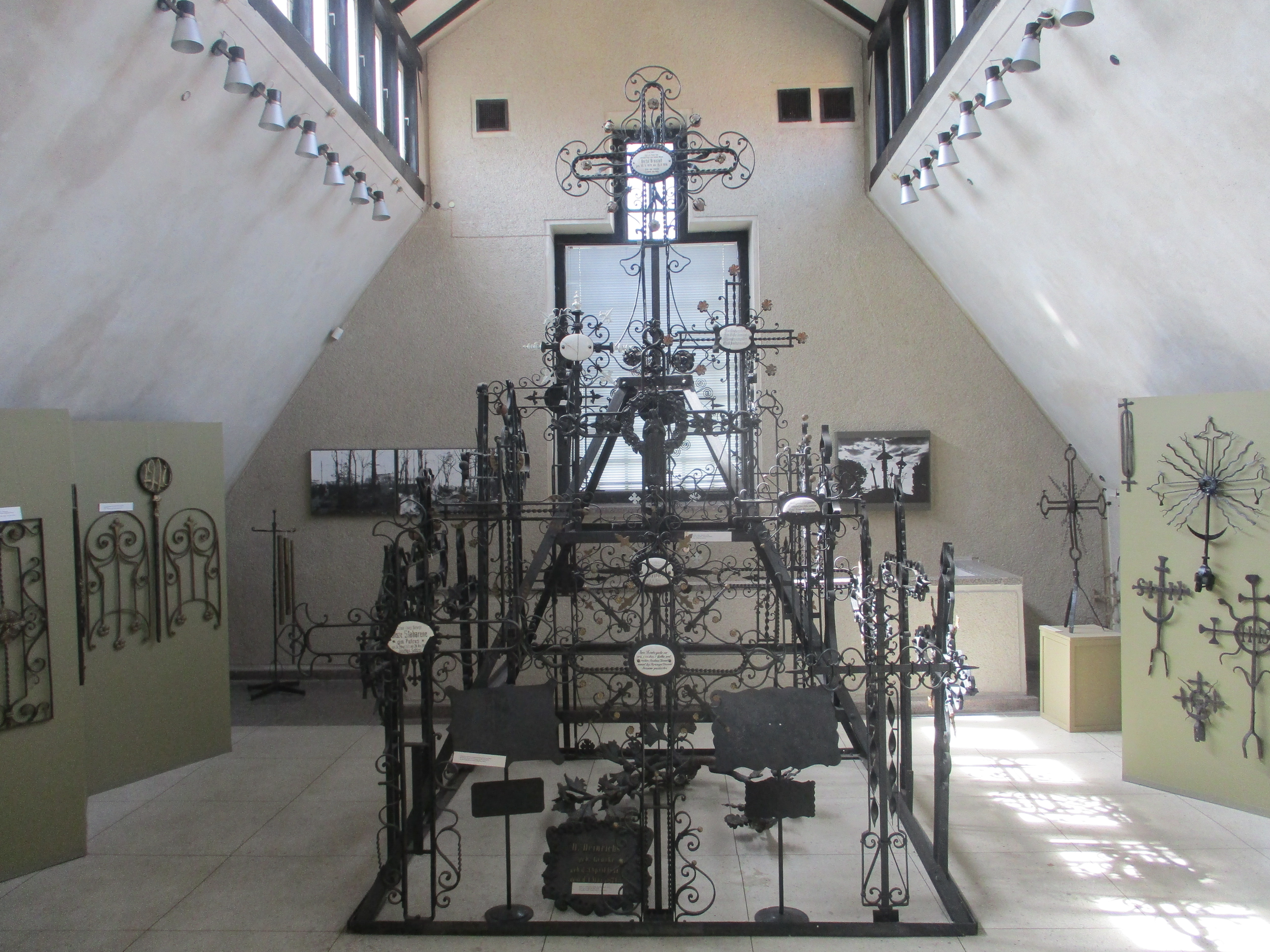
Lithuanian metal crosses at The Blacksmith's Museum in Klaipėda

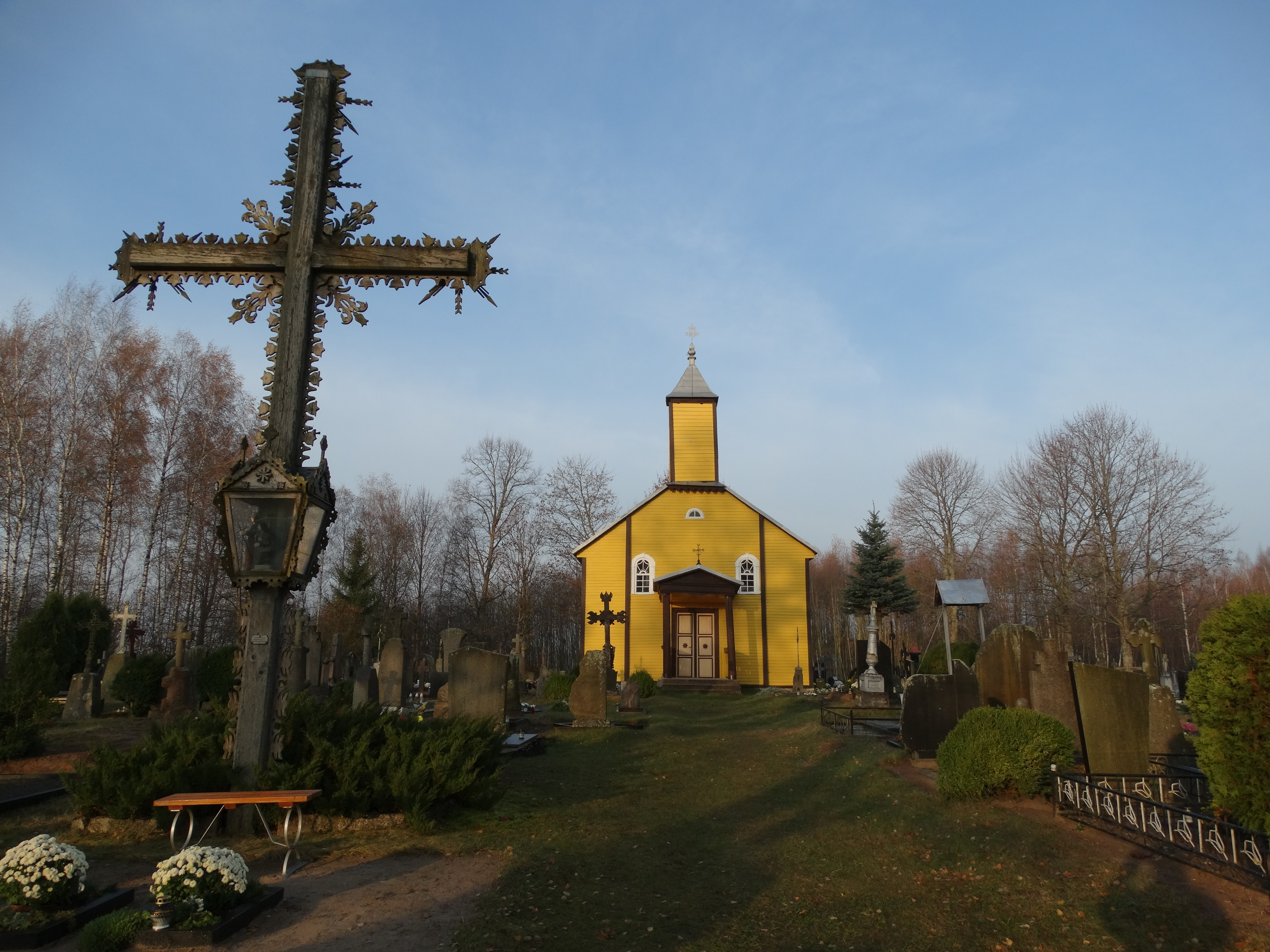
Chapel in Deikiškiai, Biržai district, Lithuania

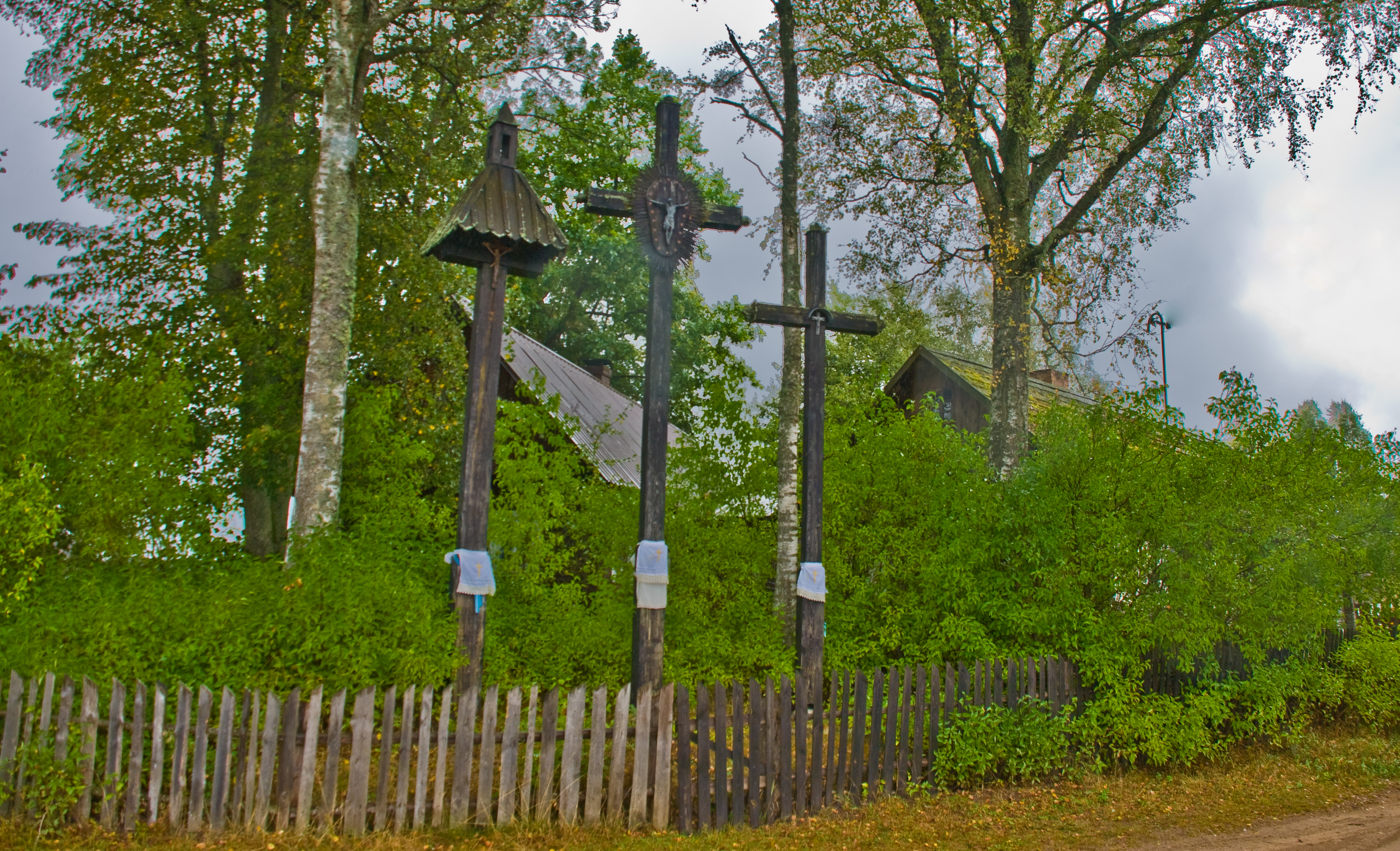
Shrine at Zervynos, Lithuania

== See also ==
- Dievdirbys, or "god carver"
- Roofed pole
