= Lithuanian =

Lithuanian may refer to:

- Something of, from, or related to Lithuania, a country in the Baltic region in northern Europe
  - Lithuanian language
  - Lithuanians, a Baltic ethnic group, native to Lithuania and the immediate geographical region
  - Lithuanian cuisine
  - Lithuanian culture

== Other uses ==
- Lithuanian Jews as often called "Lithuanians" (Lita'im or Litvaks) by other Jews, sometimes used to mean Mitnagdim
- Grand Duchy of Lithuania
- Polish–Lithuanian Commonwealth

== See also ==
- List of Lithuanians
