= Alfonzo =

Alfonzo is a given name and surname. Notable people with the name include:

Surname

- Alfredo Armas Alfonzo (1921–1990), Venezuelan writer, critic, editor and historian
- Carlos Alfonzo, Cuban-American painter
- DeJuan Alfonzo (born 1977), American football wide receiver/linebacker
- Edgardo Alfonzo a.k.a. "Fonzie" (born 1973), Major League Baseball infielder
- Eliézer Alfonzo (born 1979), professional baseball catcher
- José Luis Alfonzo (born 1961), Argentinian film actor
- Juan Pablo Perez Alfonzo (1903–1979), Venezuelan diplomat, politician and lawyer

Given name

- Alfonzo Dennard (born 1989), American football cornerback
- Luis Alfonzo García (born 1978), professional baseball first baseman
- Alfonzo Giordano (1937–2013), senior ranking officer in the Philadelphia Police Department, convicted of accepting bribes
- Alfonzo Graham (born 2000), American football player
- Luis Alfonzo Larrain (1911–1996), Venezuelan composer, music director and producer
- Alfonzo Ratliff or Alfonso Ratliff (born 1956), American boxer
- Alfonzo Sturzenegger (1888–1949), American football and baseball player and coach

== Fictional characters ==
- Alfonzo Frohicky, a character in Ninjago

== See also ==
- Afono
- Alfoz
- Alonzo (disambiguation)
