= Roofed pole =

Lithuanian wooden shrine

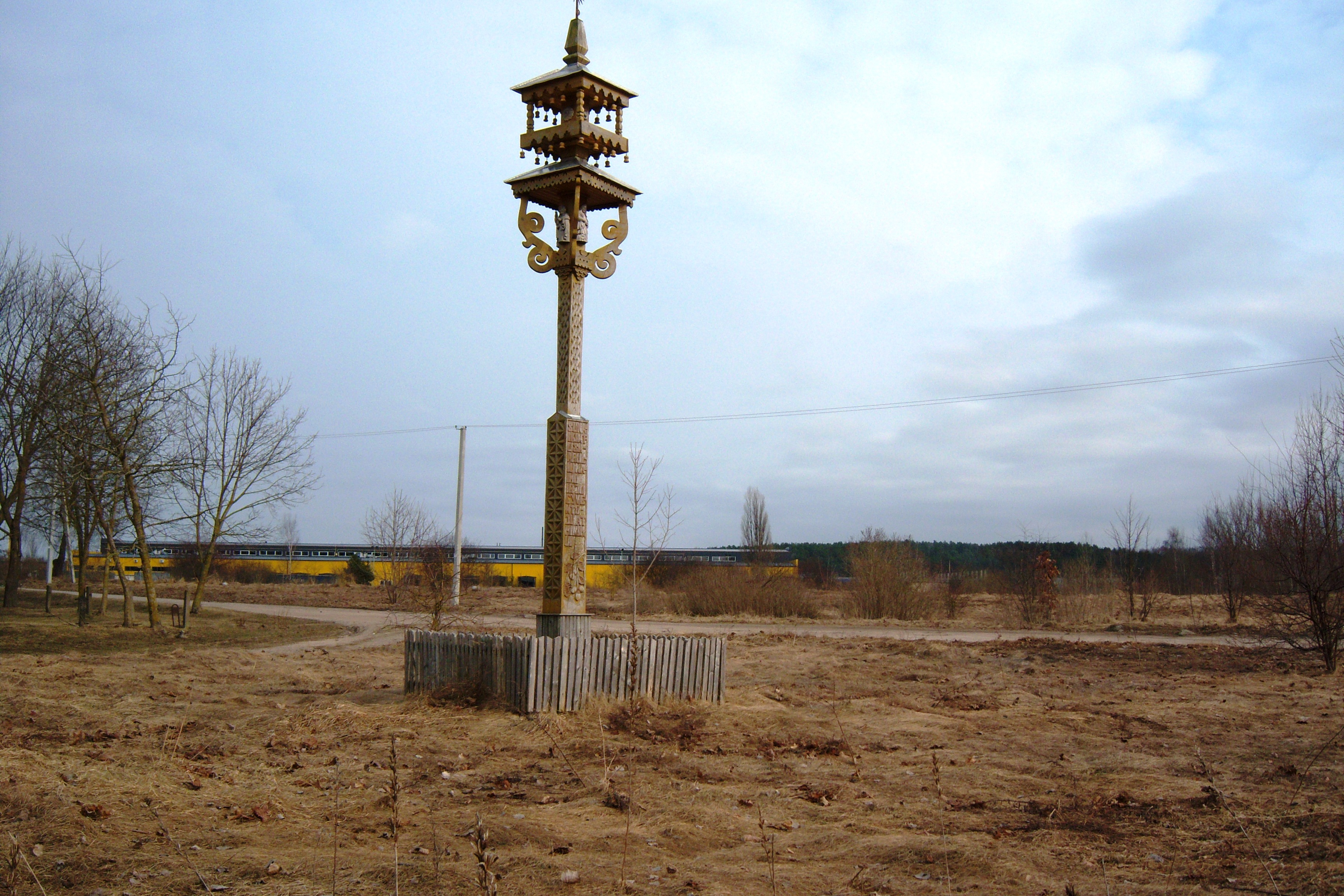
A roofed pole in Skaruliai village near Jonava.

Roofed pole or roofed pillar (Lithuanian: stogastulpis, plural: stogastulpiai, from stogas – 'roof' and stulpas – 'pole, pillar') is a traditional Lithuanian wooden shrine. They may have anywhere between one and three layers of stylized roofs. Roofed poles can be simple, or richly decorated. Nowadays the most common ornamentation are a distinctive blend of Christian symbolism and traditional solar, celestial, and nature motifs. Stogastulpiai, together with Lithuanian crosses, are common throughout Lithuania, and can be found in churchyards, village/town squares, cemeteries, farms, parks, in fields and woods, at cross-roads, and as wayside shrines.

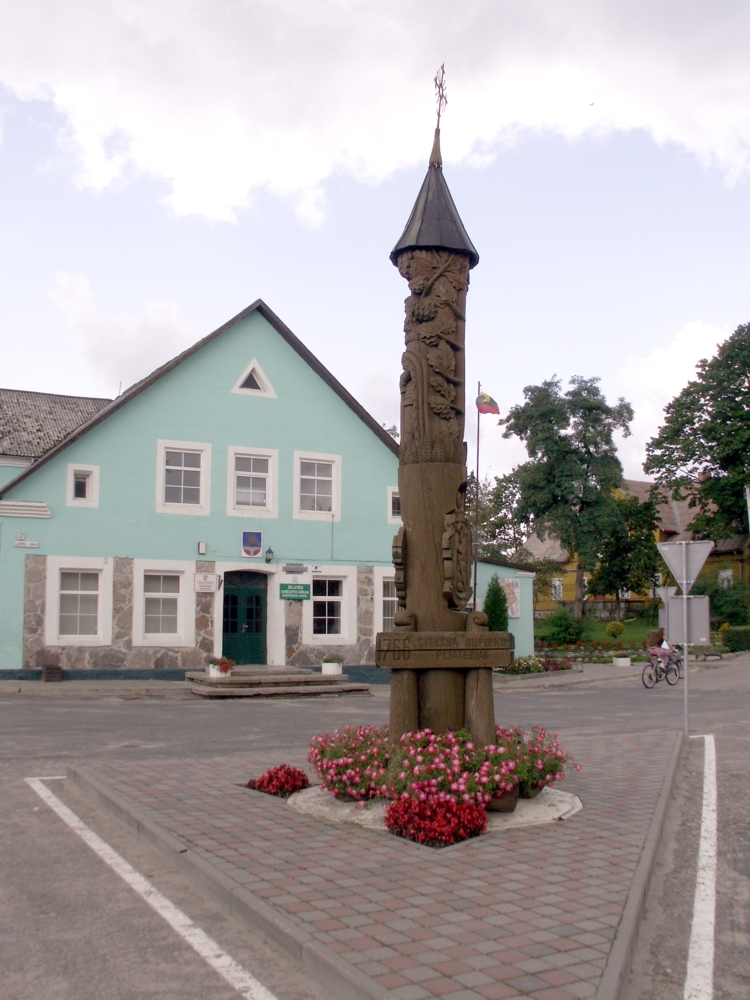
A roofed pole in the Švėkšna town center

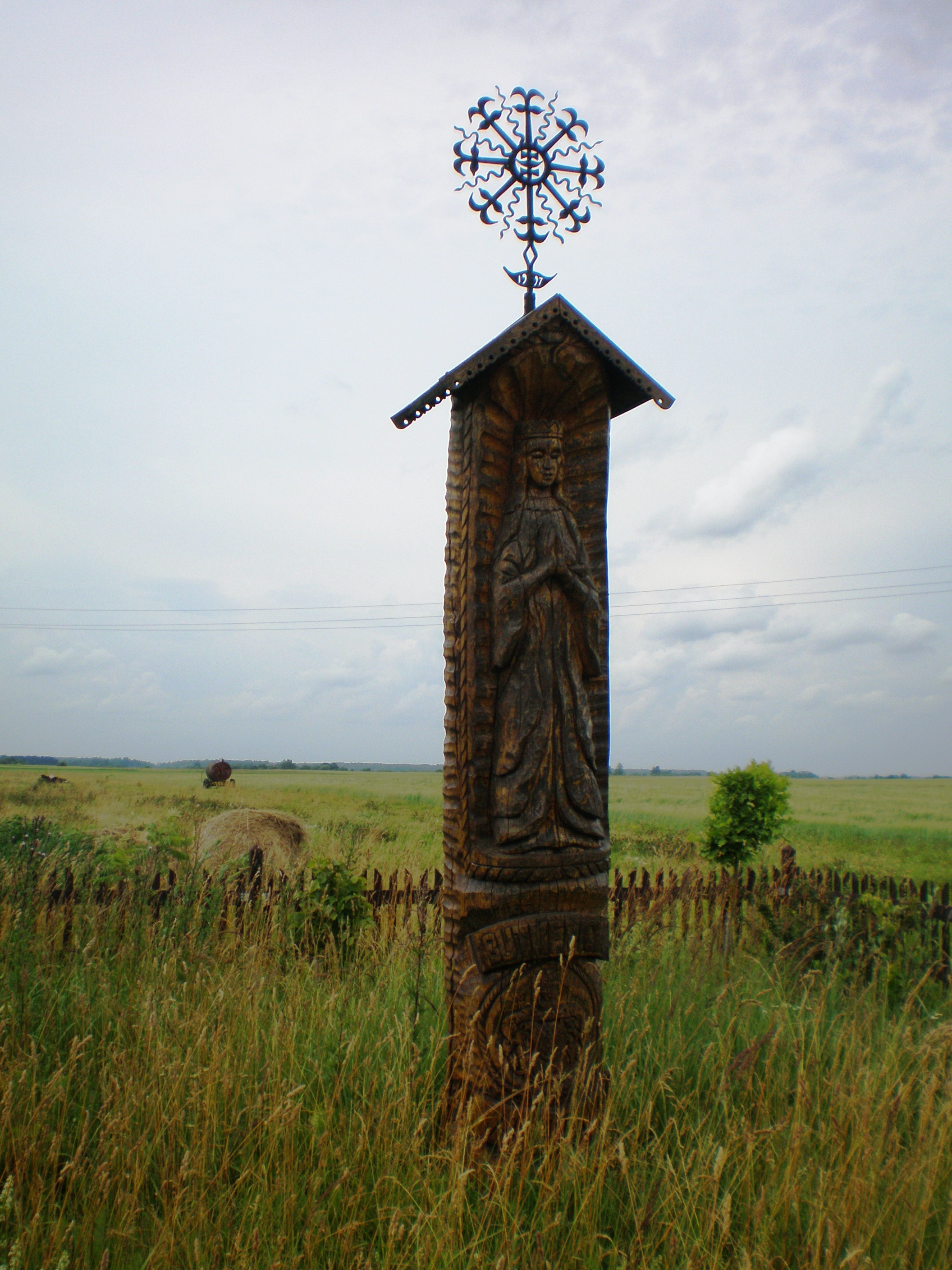
A roofed pole tipped with an ornate iron cross with floral motif. Angiras village, northwest of Josvainiai.

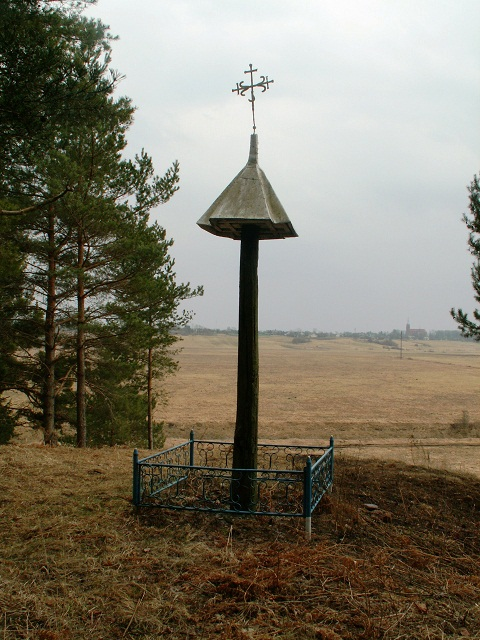
A roofed pole near Alkas, Kretinga district, Lithuania.

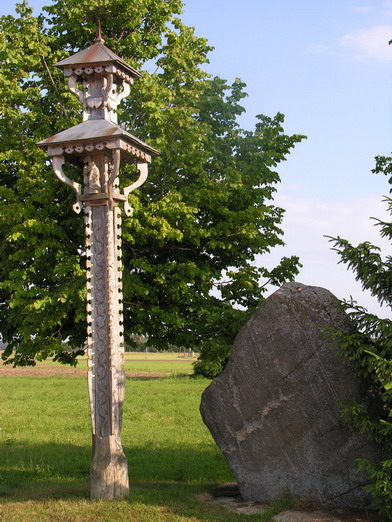
A roofed pole near Savarina village, Mažeikiai district, Lithuania. Note snake motif of roof "supports."

== See also ==
- Dievdirbys
- Lithuanian cross crafting
- Irminsul
