= Alfonsas Žalys =

Lithuanian politician

Alfonsas Žalys (October 5, 1929 – December 12, 2006) was a Lithuanian politician. In 1990 he was among those who signed the Act of the Re-Establishment of the State of Lithuania.

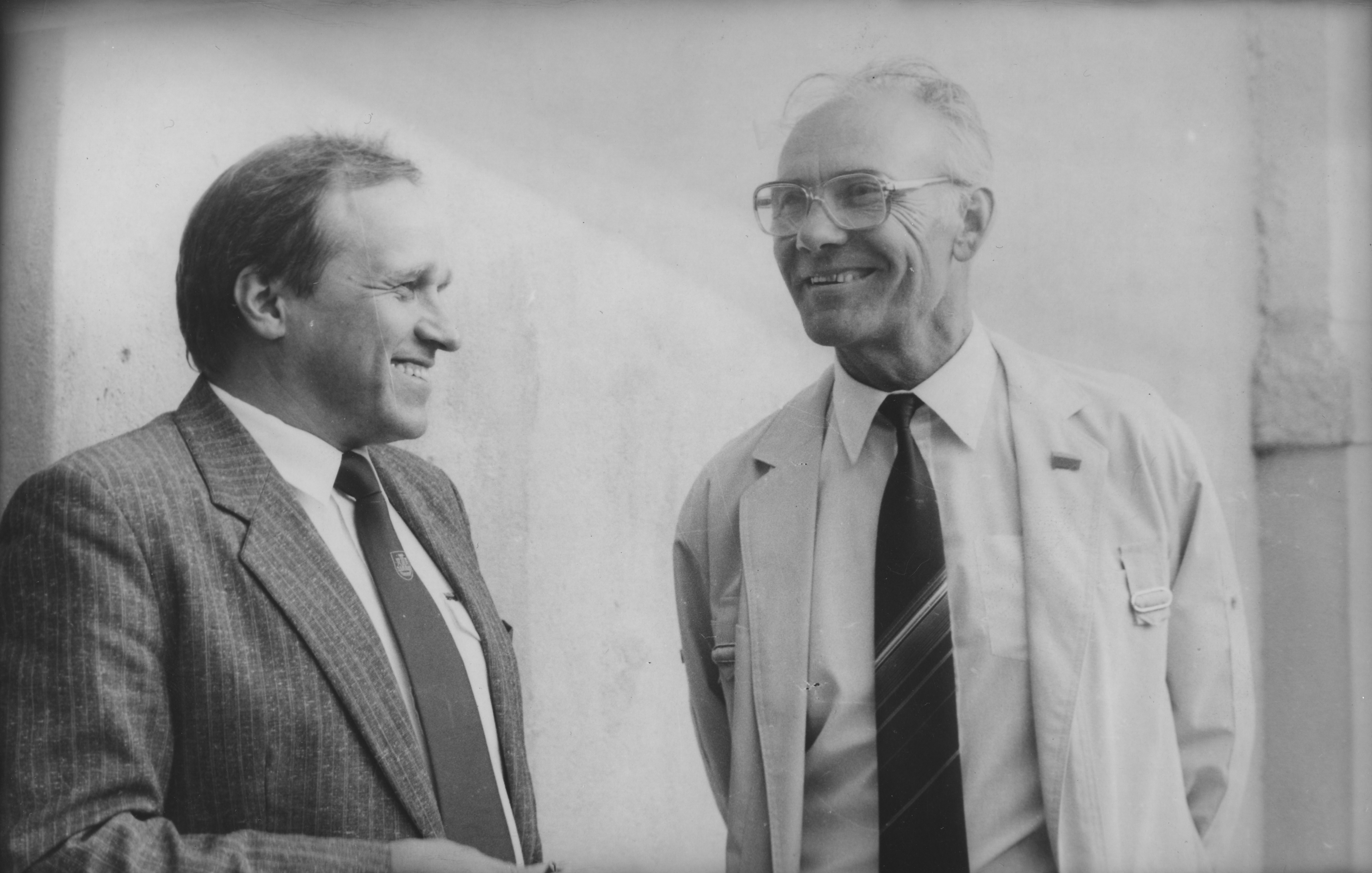
Vytautas Čepas and Alfonsas Žalys (rightside) in Klaipėda, August 1992
