= Alfonsas Dargis =

Lithuanian painter, graphic artist, set designer and poet

Alfonsas Dargis (12 May 1909 in Reivyčiai, Mažeikiai parish – 13 January 1996 in Friedrichshafen, Baden-Württemberg land, buried in Friedrichshafen cemetery) was a Lithuanian painter, graphic artist, set designer and poet.
