= Dievdirbys =

Lithuanian wood carver who creates religious statues

Dievdirbys ("God worker/craftsman", plural: Dievdirbiai) is a Lithuanian wood carver who crafts Catholic statues of Jesus and the Christian saints. In the 18th-20th centuries, self-taught poor peasants mostly did it. The art is closely related to Lithuanian cross crafting, listed among Masterpieces of the Oral and Intangible Heritage of Humanity by UNESCO.

The carvers frequently carved sculptures depicting Jesus Christ either Pensive (in Lithuanian rūpintojėlis) or Crucified, the Mother of God Mary (as the Pietà, Our Lady of Sorrows, the Gracious), saints (Saint George, Saint Anne, Agatha of Sicily, John of Nepomuk, Isidore the Laborer, and others). Other popular figures are the Nativity, Saint Casimir, Saint Roch, Saint Florian, Saint Anthony.

The statues are carved according to artistic conventions developed over the centuries following Lithuania's adoption of Christianity. They are displayed along roadsides, in cemeteries, and in chapels or churches.

Using basic tools, the sculptures were carved out of linden wood, or occasionally oak, and sometimes painted. Along with three-dimensional sculptures, relief and bas-relief were also cultivated. The works decorate the altars of rural churches, of portable church altars, processional banners, aediculas, dwellings, and barns. The Stations of the Cross often feature these works as well.

== Gallery ==
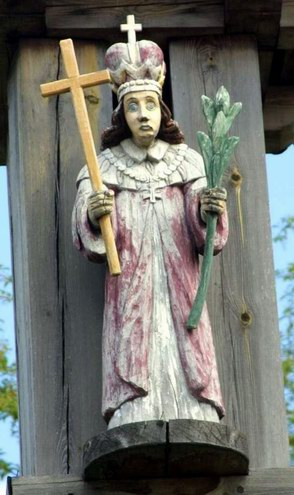
St. Casimir, the patron saint of Lithuania

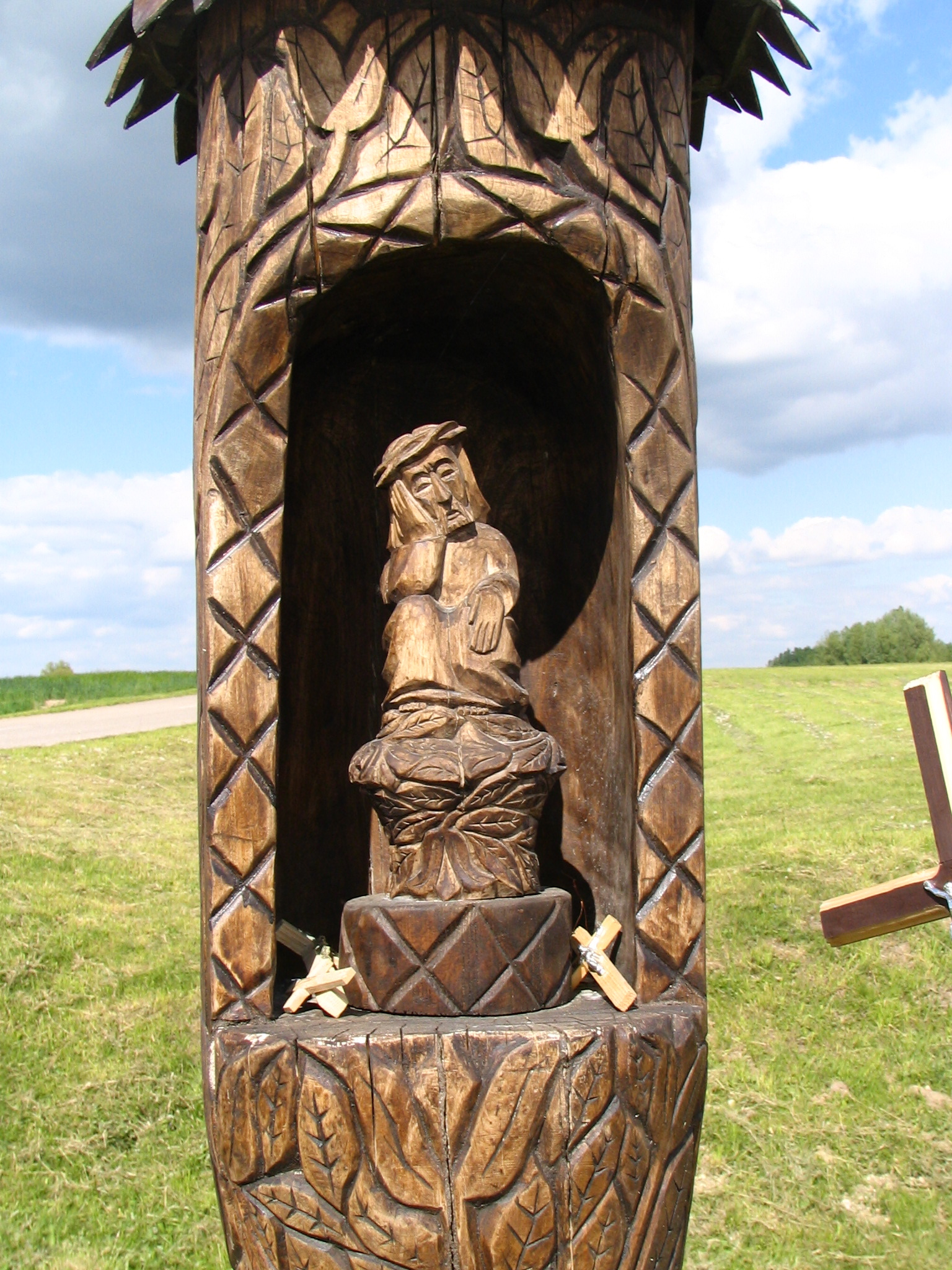
Roadside shrine with Pensive Christ

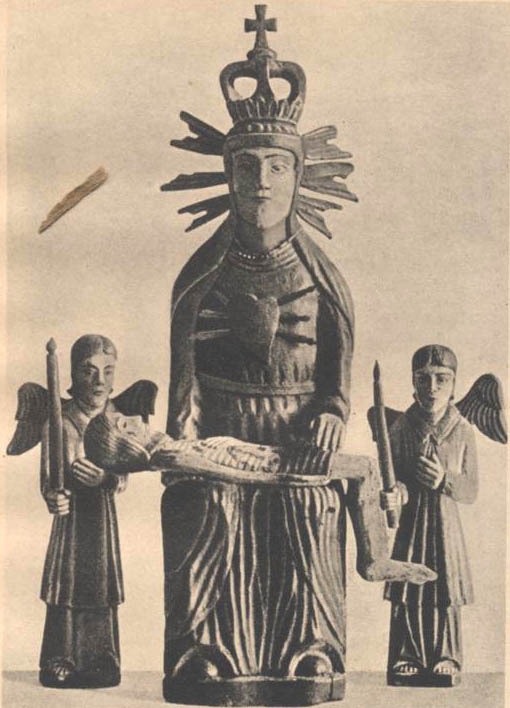
Pietà

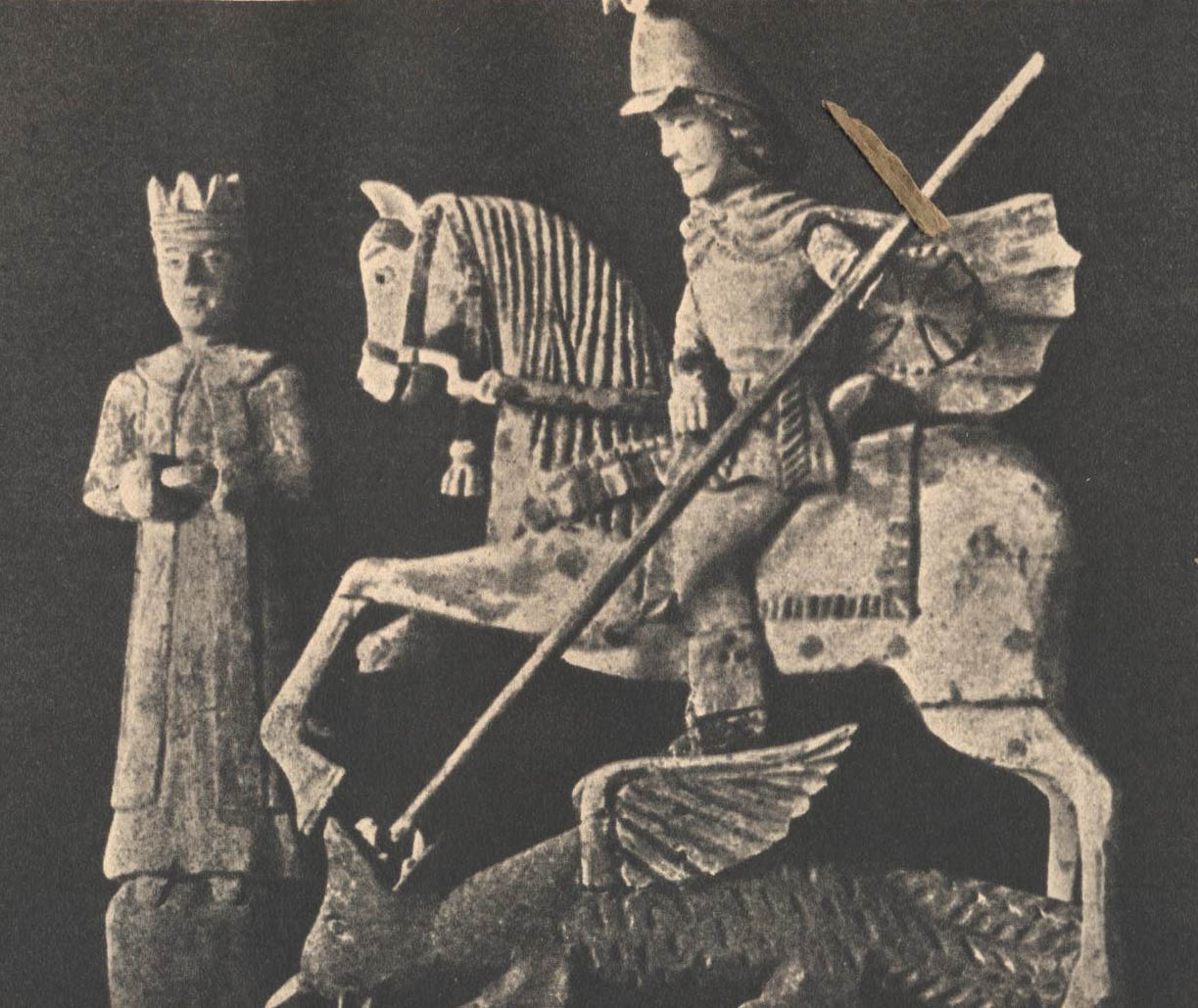
St. George and the dragon
