= Kanpai =

Kanpai! (乾杯 (かんぱい)), or Kampai, is a common toast in the Japanese language. It may also refer to:

== Music ==
- Kanpai (album), a 1980 album by Tsuyoshi Nagabuchi
- "Kanpai" (Tsuyoshi Nagabuchi song), a 1980 song by Tsuyoshi Nagabuchi
- "Kanpai!" (song), a 1985 song by Rumiko Koyanagi
- "Kanpai", a 1975 single by Jun Mayuzumi
- "Kanpai", a single by Jerry Fujio

== Other ==
- Campae or Kampai, a town in ancient Cappadocia
- Kanpai!, a Japanese manga
- Kampai, another name for the bean Parkia speciosa
- Kampai I and Kampai II, villages in Lithuania
