= Plaktiniai =

- Village
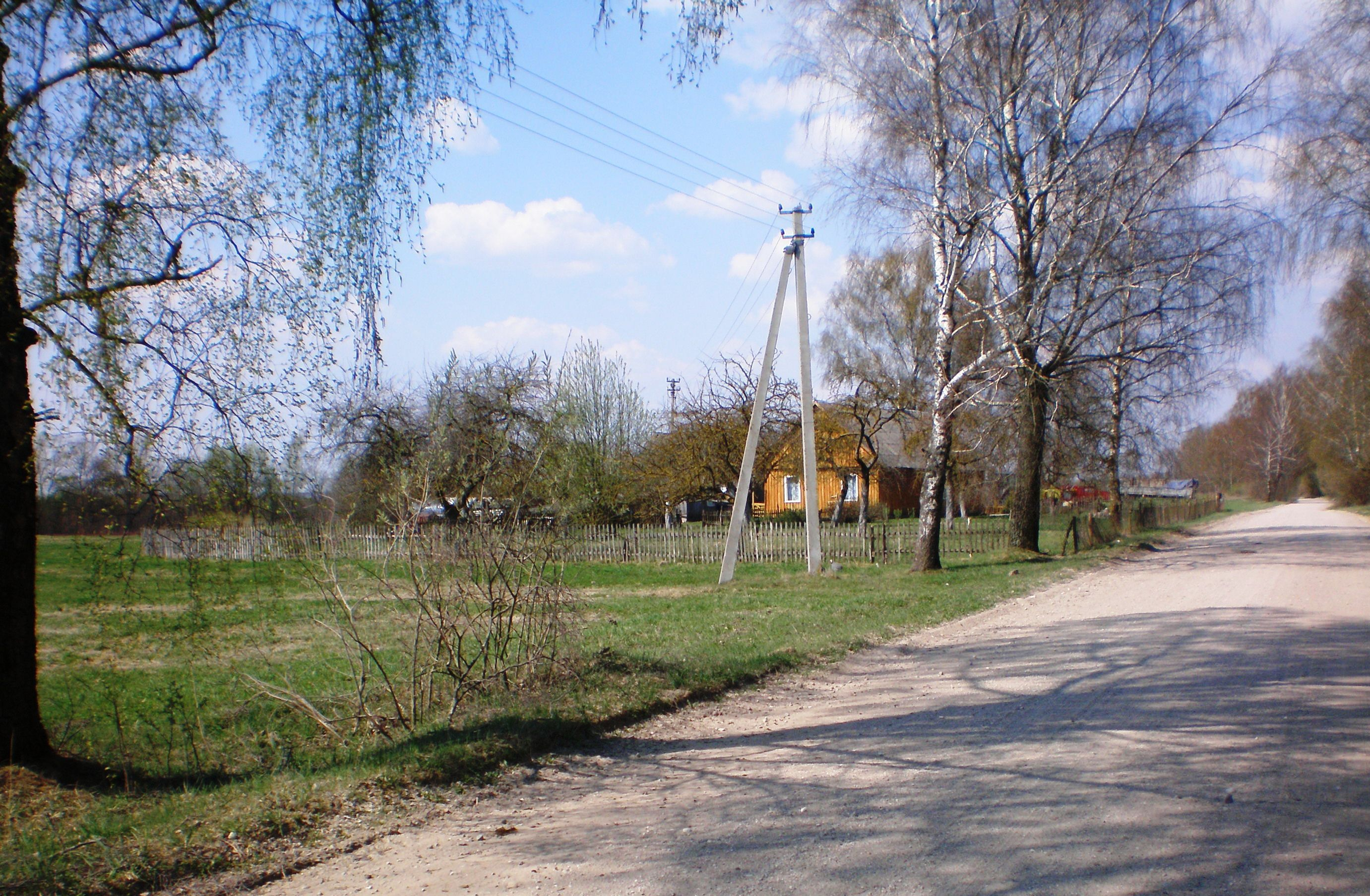

- Location in Lithuania Plaktiniai (Lithuania)
- Coordinates: 55°13′52″N 23°51′29″E
- Country: Lithuania
- County: Kaunas County
- Municipality: Kėdainiai district municipality
- Eldership: Josvainiai Eldership

Population (2011)
  - Total: 8
- Time zone: UTC+2 (EET)
  - Summer (DST): UTC+3 (EEST)

Plaktiniai (formerly Russian: Плахтыни, Polish: Płachtynie) is a village in Kėdainiai district municipality, in Kaunas County, in central Lithuania. According to the 2011 census, the village had a population of 8 people. It is located 2.5 kilometres (1.6 mi) from Josvainiai, by the Josvainiai-Vainikai road and the Žiedupė river. The Šušvė Landscape Sanctuary is located next to Plaktiniai.

== History ==
The village has been known since 1595.

== Demography ==
Historical population

Year	Pop.	±% p.a.
1866	112	—
1902	168	+1.13%
1923	147	−0.63%
1959	108	−0.85%
1970	73	−3.50%

Year	Pop.	±% p.a.
1979	32	−8.76%
1986	37	+2.10%
1989	29	−7.80%
2001	9	−9.29%
2011	8	−1.17%

Source: 1902, 1923, 1959 & 1970, 1979, 1989, 2001, 2011

== Images ==
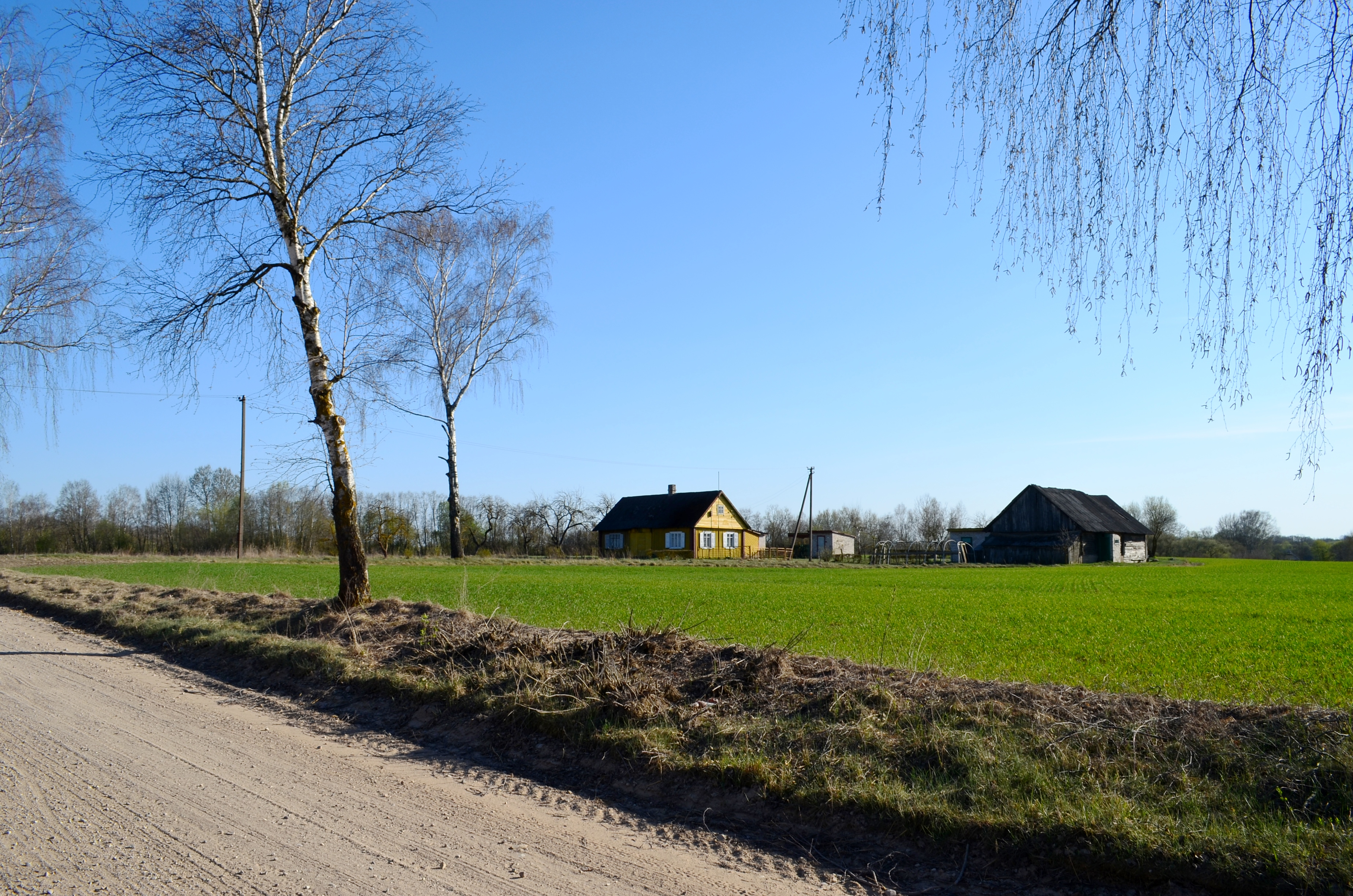
Plaktiniai homestead

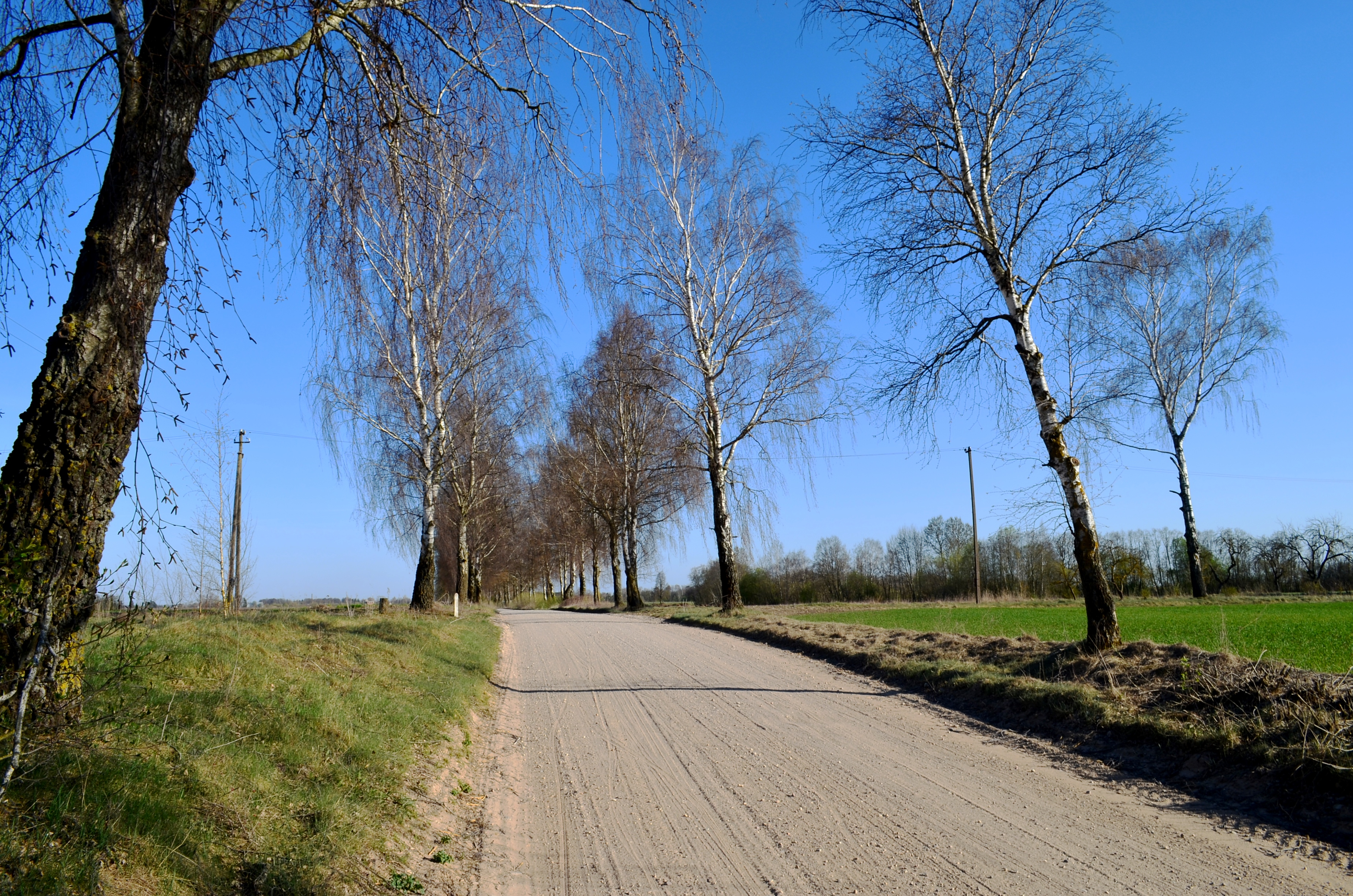
Birch alley alongside the main road

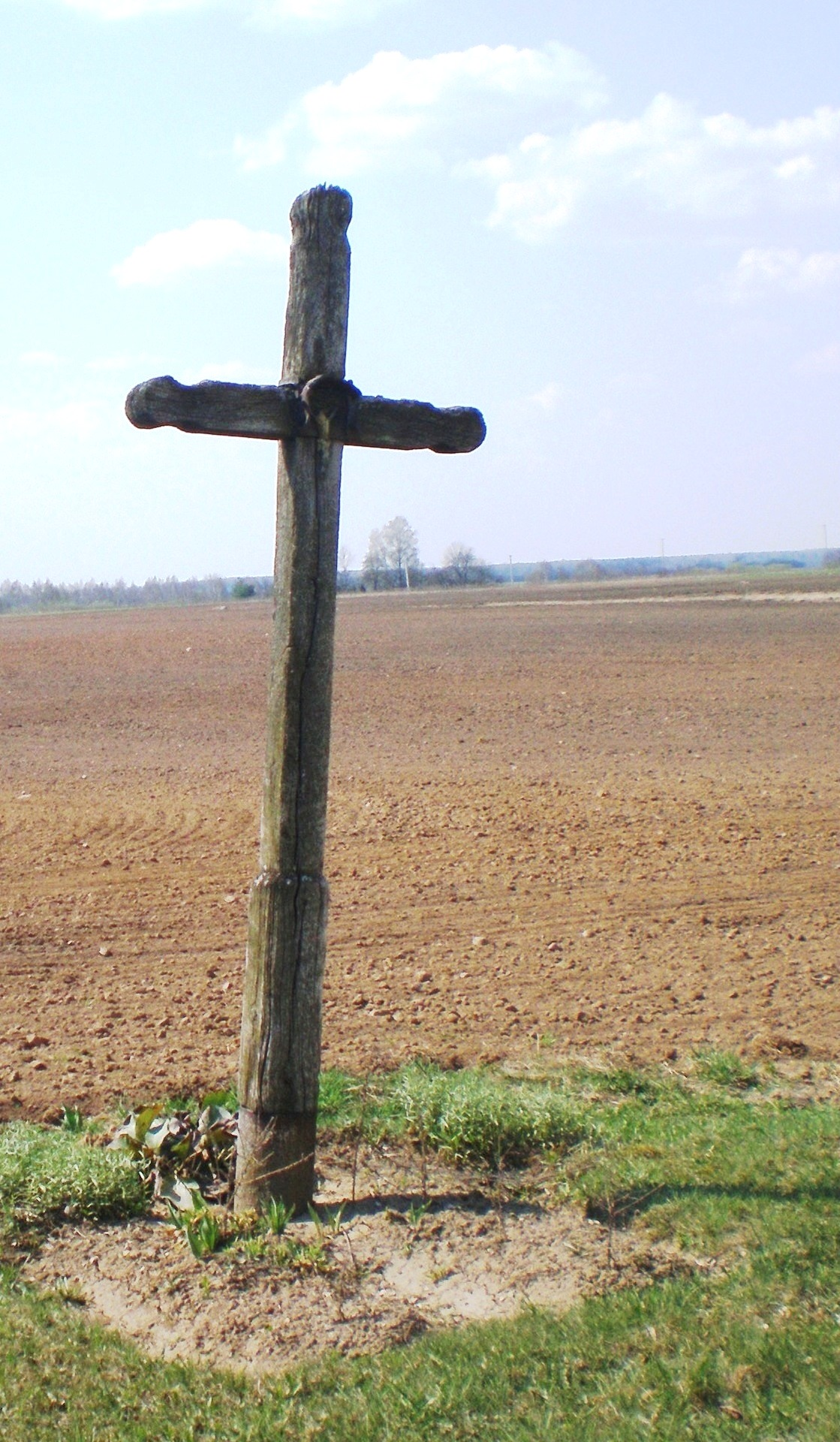
Wayside cross
