= Žiedupė =

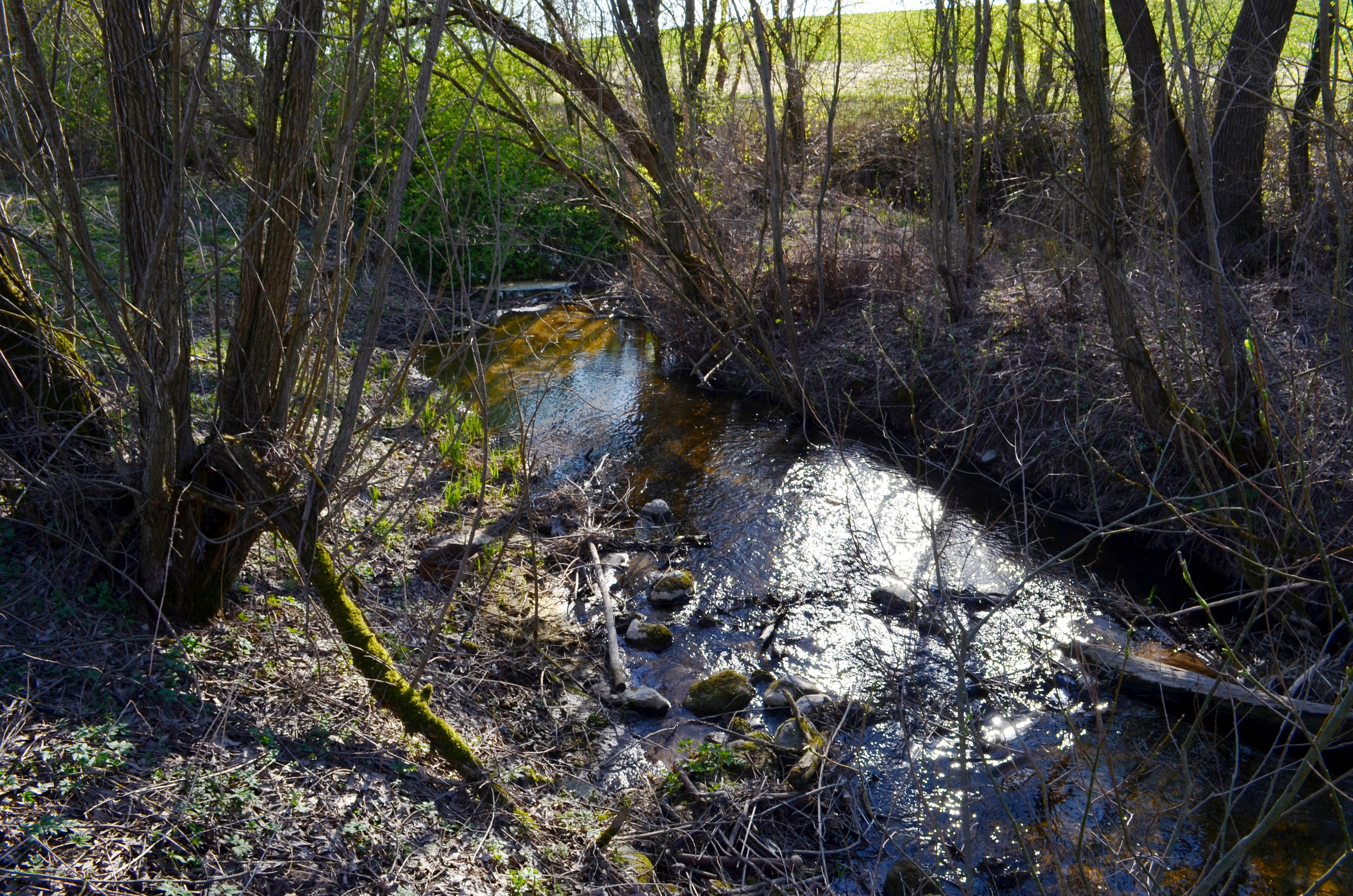
- The lower course of the Žiedupė

Location
- Country: Lithuania
- Region: Kėdainiai district municipality, Kaunas County

Physical characteristics
- Source
  - location: Near Šingaliai
  - coordinates: 55.257°N 23.864°E
- Mouth: Šušvė nearby Plaktiniai
  - coordinates: 55.2278°N 23.8535°E
- Length: 12.3 km (7.6 mi)
- Basin size: 17.3 km^{2} (6.7 sq mi)

Basin features
- Progression: Šušvė→ Nevėžis→ Neman→ Baltic Sea

The Žiedupė (or Žiedupys) is a river of Kėdainiai district municipality, Kaunas County, central Lithuania. It flows for 12.3 kilometres (7.6 mi) and has a basin area of 17.3 km^{2} (6.7 sq mi). It is a left tributary of the river Šušvė.

It begins 2 kilometres (1.2 mi) north to Josvainiai, nearby Šingaliai village. It flows mostly southwards and meets the Šušvė nearby Plaktiniai village. Josvainiai village, Pažiedupys and Plaktiniai are located on the banks of the Žiedupė.

The name Žiedupė is a compound noun and derives from the Lithuanian words žiedas ('flower, blosom' or 'ring') and upė ('river').
