= Galulaukiai =

- Village
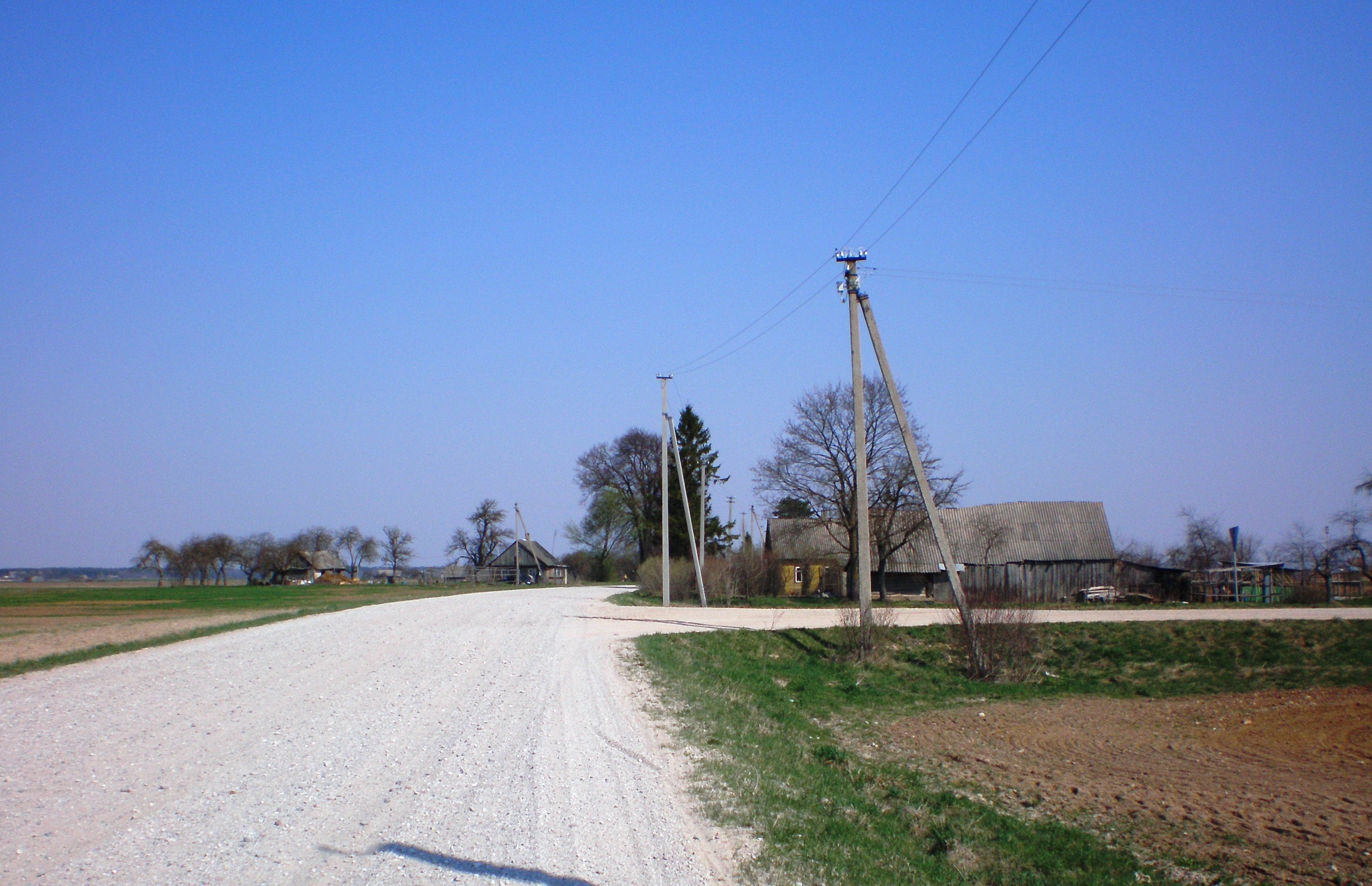

- Location in Lithuania Galulaukiai (Lithuania)
- Coordinates: 55°13′59″N 23°53′10″E
- Country: Lithuania
- County: Kaunas County
- Municipality: Kėdainiai district municipality
- Eldership: Josvainiai Eldership

Population (2011)
  - Total: 30
- Time zone: UTC+2 (EET)
  - Summer (DST): UTC+3 (EEST)

Galulaukiai ('ends of field', formerly Russian: Концеполь, Polish: Końcepol) is a village in Kėdainiai district municipality, in Kaunas County, in central Lithuania. According to the 2011 census, the village had a population of 30 people. It is located 3.5 kilometres (2.2 mi) from Josvainiai, by the Upytė rivulet, alongside the road Šingailiai-Paliepiai.

== History ==
At the beginning of the 20th century there was Galulaukiai village and estate.

== Demography ==
Historical population

| Year | Pop. | ±% p.a. |
|---|---|---|
| 1902 | 200 | — |
| 1923 | 136 | −1.82% |
| 1959 | 98 | −0.91% |
| 1970 | 75 | −2.40% |

| Year | Pop. | ±% p.a. |
|---|---|---|
| 1979 | 51 | −4.19% |
| 1989 | 34 | −3.97% |
| 2001 | 36 | +0.48% |
| 2011 | 30 | −1.81% |

Source: 1902, 1923, 1959 & 1970, 1979, 1989, 2001, 2011
