= Šušvė Landscape Sanctuary =

Sanctuary in Lithuania

- IUCN category VI (protected area with sustainable use of natural resources)
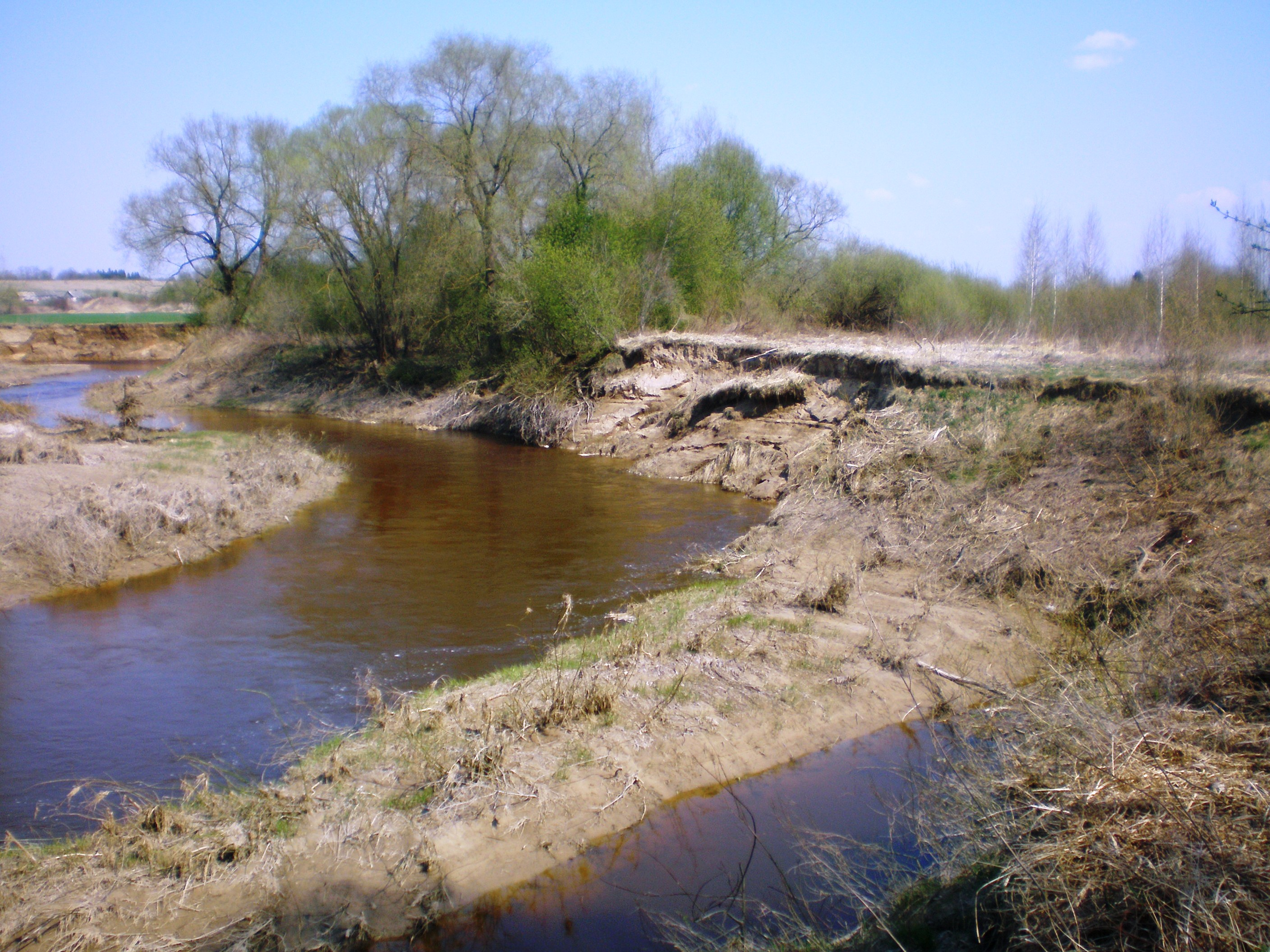
- Outcrops alongside the Šušvė

- Location within Lithuania Location within Kėdainiai District Municipality
- Location: Josvainiai Eldership, Kėdainiai District Municipality, Lithuania
- Nearest town: Josvainiai
- Coordinates: 55°11′23″N 23°50′09″E
- Area: 4.96 km^{2} (1.92 sq mi)
- Established: 1974
- Governing body: Lithuanian Service of Protected Areas

The Šušvė Landscape Sanctuary (Lithuanian: Šušvės kraštovaizdžio draustinis) is a protected area of a state importance in Josvainiai Eldership, Kėdainiai District Municipality, in central Lithuania. It was established in 1974 and covers an area of 4.96 square kilometres (1.92 sq mi). It covers the lower course of the Šušvė river between Macgaliai village and the Šušvė confluence with the Nevėžis river. It also include the lower courses of the Šušvė tributaries the Žiedupė, the Vikšrupis and the Putnupys.

The aim of the sanctuary is to protect the Šušvė river valley with outcrops and vimba spawning grounds. The valley is of 100–200 metres (330–660 ft) width, 16–17 metres (52–56 ft) depth, slopes and terraces are covered by bushes and leafy groves. The river course is loopy, there are oxbow lakes. The river flow is rapid, deeply burrows into the earth. There are outcrops of Devonic sand, clay and gypsum. Suphosic circuses could be observed on the river slopes.

There are rare plant species, growing on the riparian meadows, such as star gentian, Conioselinum tataricum, Campanula bononiensis, Orchis militaris. Common kingfishers nest on the scarps, and Eurasian otters live in the river water.
