= Vainikai =

- Village
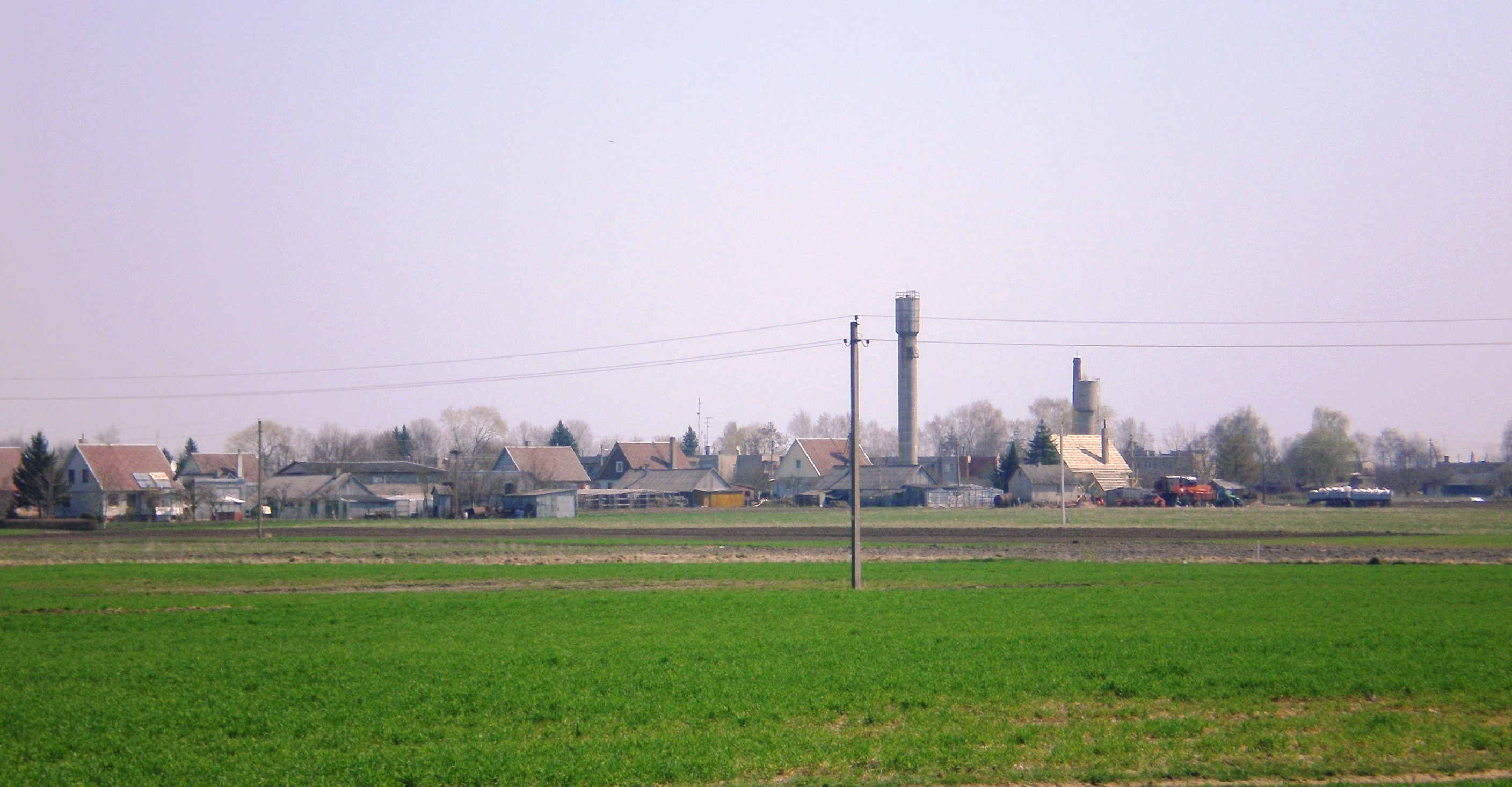

- Location in Lithuania Vainikai (Lithuania)
- Coordinates: 55°12′50″N 23°52′59″E
- Country: Lithuania
- County: Kaunas County
- Municipality: Kėdainiai district municipality
- Eldership: Josvainiai Eldership

Population (2011)
  - Total: 283
- Time zone: UTC+2 (EET)
  - Summer (DST): UTC+3 (EEST)

Vainikai is a village in Kėdainiai district municipality, in Kaunas County, in central Lithuania. According to the 2011 census, the village had a population of 283 people. It is located 4.5 kilometres (2.8 mi) from Josvainiai, on the right bank of the Nevėžis river by the Upytė river mouth. There are former school, medicine station.

== History ==
Vainikai has been established in the former lands of the Karūnava estate during the Interwar. In the Soviet era it was a poultry sovkhoz center.

== Demography ==
Historical population

Year	Pop.	±% p.a.
1923	334	—
1959	163	−1.97%
1970	191	+1.45%
1979	315	+5.72%

Year	Pop.	±% p.a.
1987	288	−1.11%
1989	327	+6.56%
2001	365	+0.92%
2011	283	−2.51%

Source: 1902, 1923, 1959 & 1970, 1979, 1989, 2001, 2011

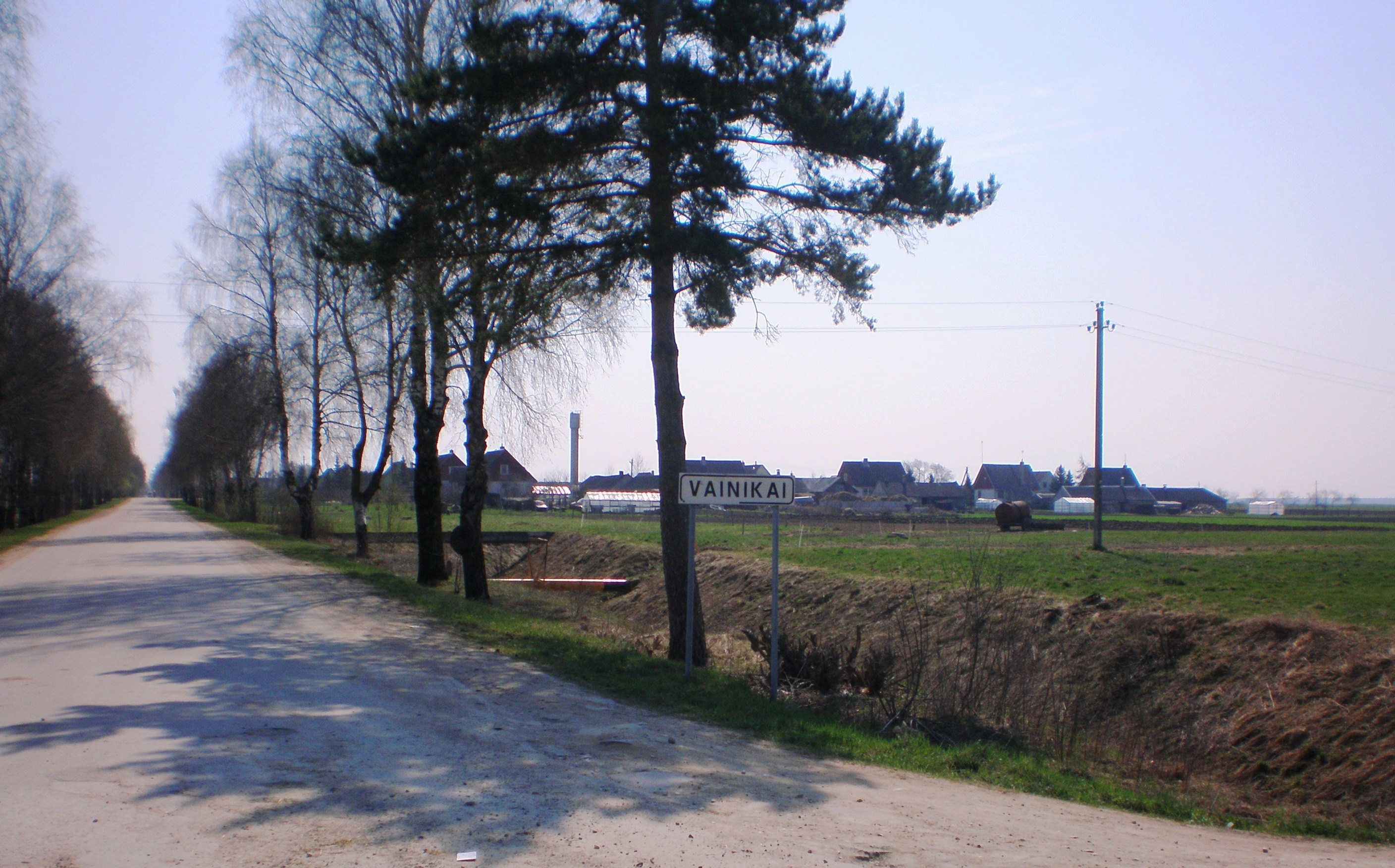
Vainikai entrance
