= Cambe =

Cambe may refer to:

- Cambé, Brazil
- Cambe (Cappadocia), Turkey
