= Prapuoleniai, Kėdainiai =

Prapuoleniai
- Hamlet
- Location in Lithuania Prapuoleniai (Lithuania)
- Coordinates: 55°12′11″N 23°46′52″E
- Country: Lithuania
- County: Kaunas County
- Municipality: Kėdainiai district municipality
- Eldership: Josvainiai Eldership

Population (2011)
  - Total: 0
- Time zone: UTC+2 (EET)
  - Summer (DST): UTC+3 (EEST)

Prapuoleniai is a hamlet in Kėdainiai district municipality, in Kaunas County, in central Lithuania. According to the 2011 census, the hamlet was uninhabited. It is located 3 kilometres (1.9 mi) from Kunioniai, by the Putnupys river and its tributary the Slajus.

== Demography ==
Historical population

Year	Pop.	±% p.a.
1902	13	—
1989	0	−100.00%

Year	Pop.	±% p.a.
2001	0	0.00%
2011	0	0.00%

Source: 1902, 1923, 1959 & 1970, 1979, 1989, 2001, 2011
