= Šingaliai =

- Village
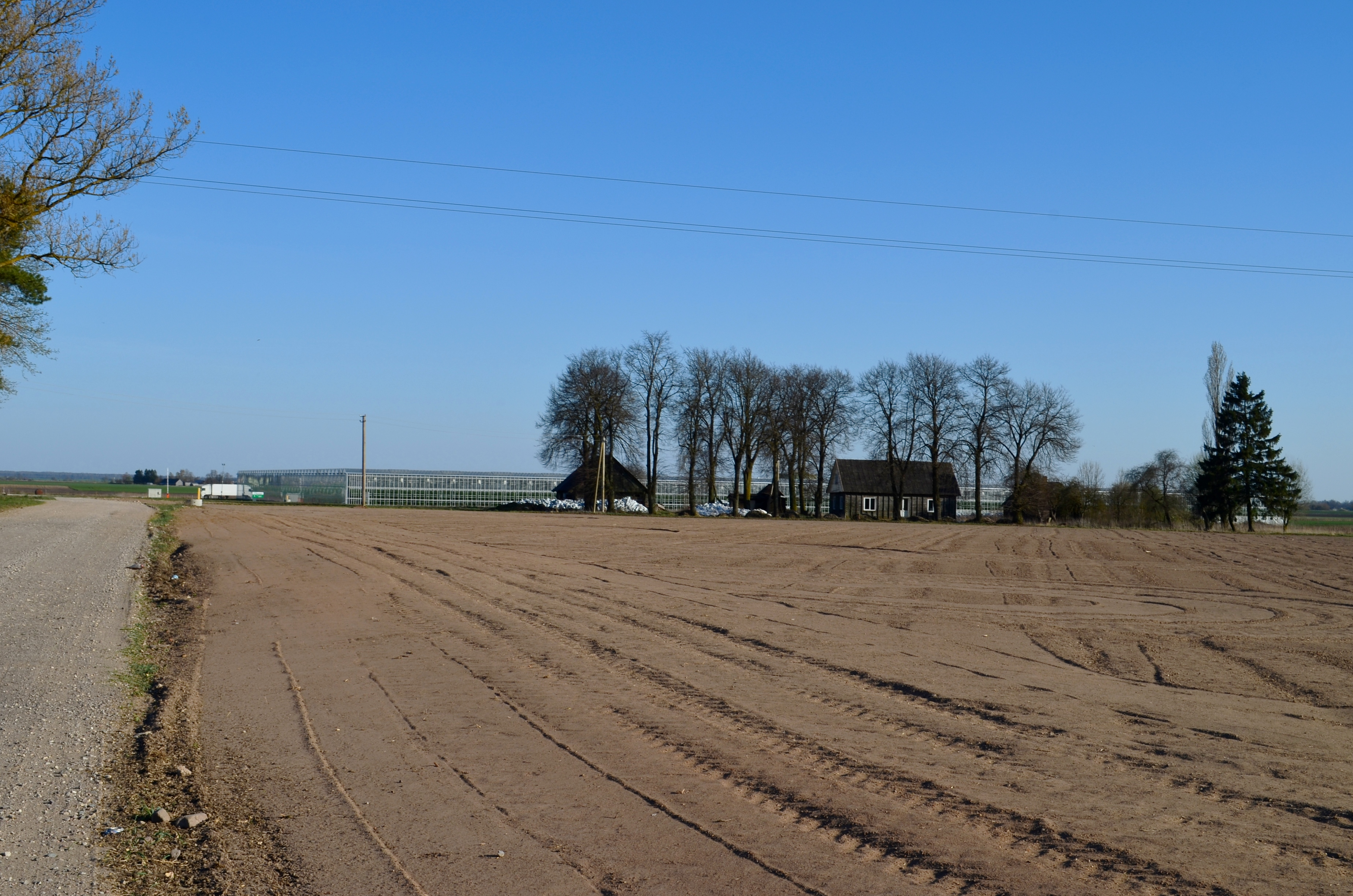

- Location in Lithuania Šingaliai (Lithuania)
- Coordinates: 55°15′22″N 23°52′30″E
- Country: Lithuania
- County: Kaunas County
- Municipality: Kėdainiai district municipality
- Eldership: Josvainiai Eldership

Population (2011)
  - Total: 12
- Time zone: UTC+2 (EET)
  - Summer (DST): UTC+3 (EEST)

Šingaliai (formerly Russian: Шинголи, Polish: Szyngole) is a village in Kėdainiai district municipality, in Kaunas County, in central Lithuania. According to the 2011 census, the village had a population of 12 people. It is located 2.5 kilometres (1.6 mi) from Josvainiai, by the Žiedupė river. There are old cemetery, large greenhouse farm and canning factory in Šingaliai.

== Demography ==
Historical population

Year	Pop.	±% p.a.
1902	278	—
1923	207	−1.39%
1959	217	+0.13%
1970	150	−3.30%

Year	Pop.	±% p.a.
1979	53	−10.92%
1989	3	−24.96%
2001	18	+16.10%
2011	12	−3.97%

Source: 1902, 1923, 1959 & 1970, 1979, 1989, 2001, 2011

== Images ==
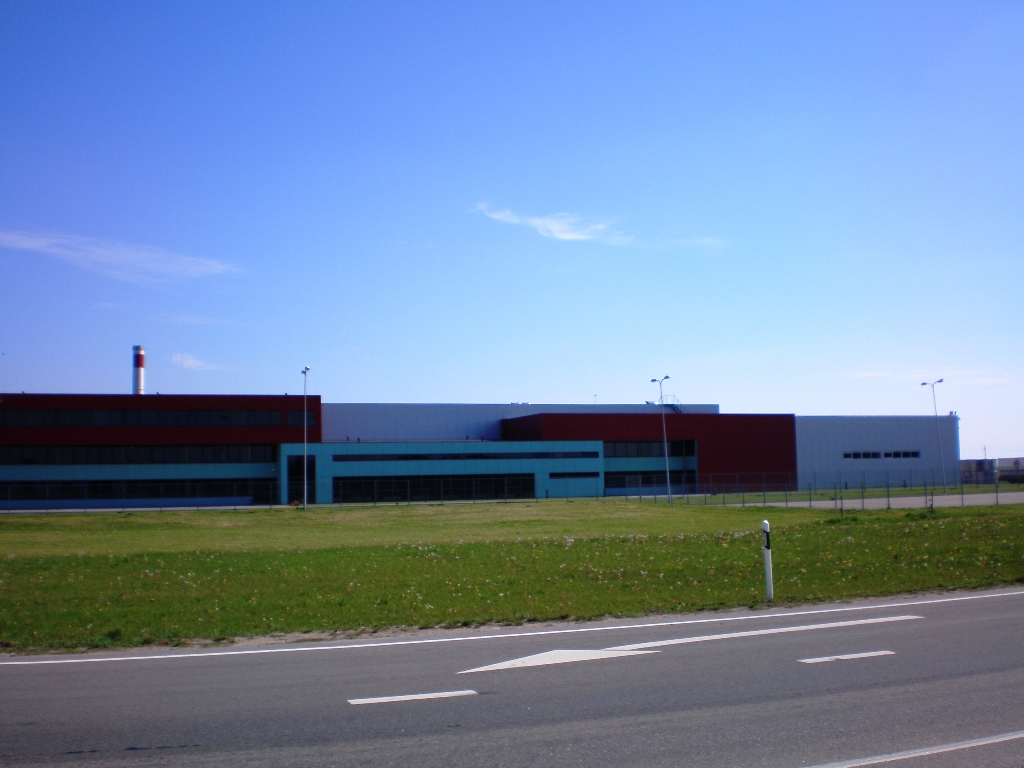
Kėdainiai canning factory

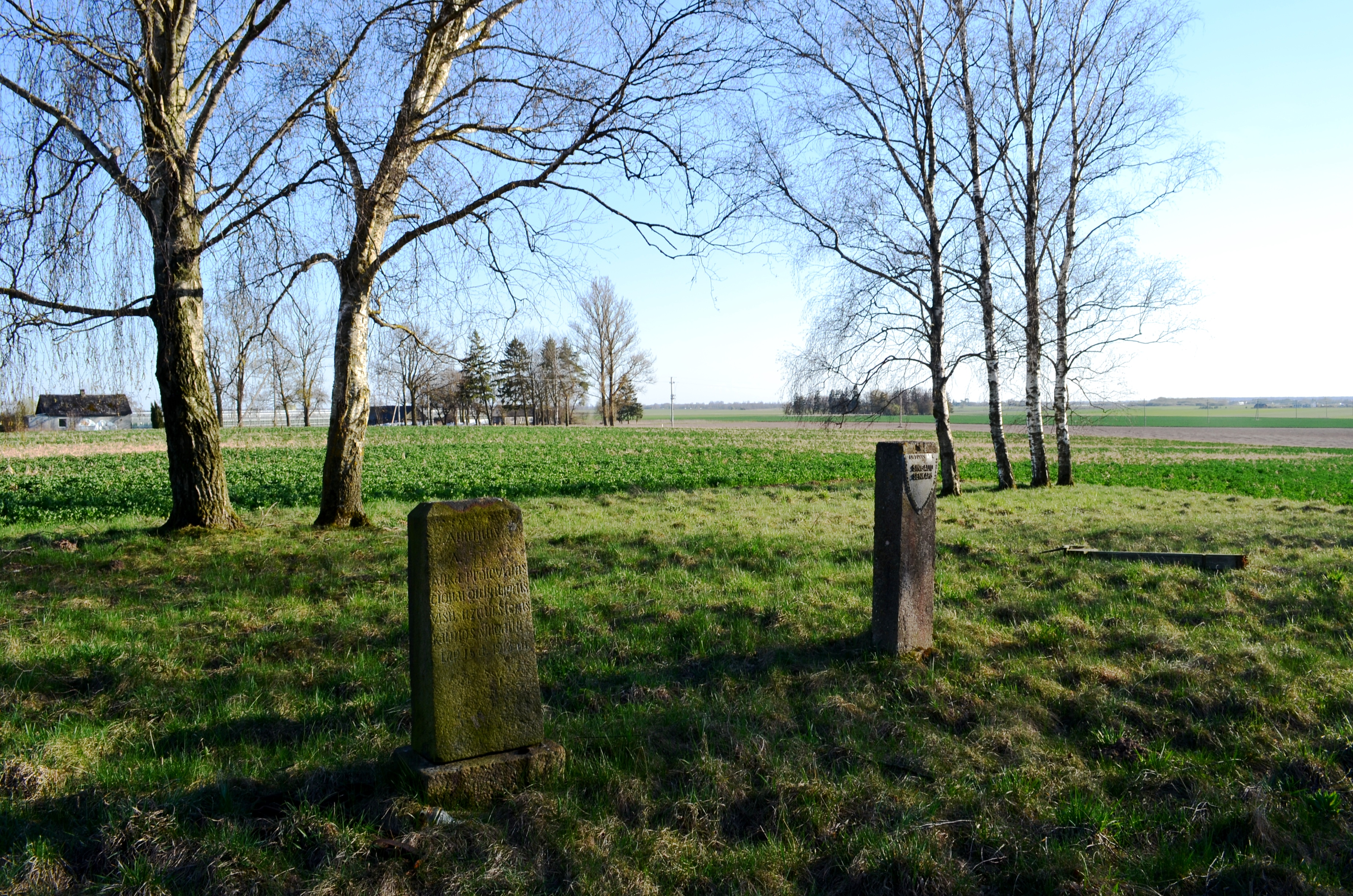
Šingaliai cemetery

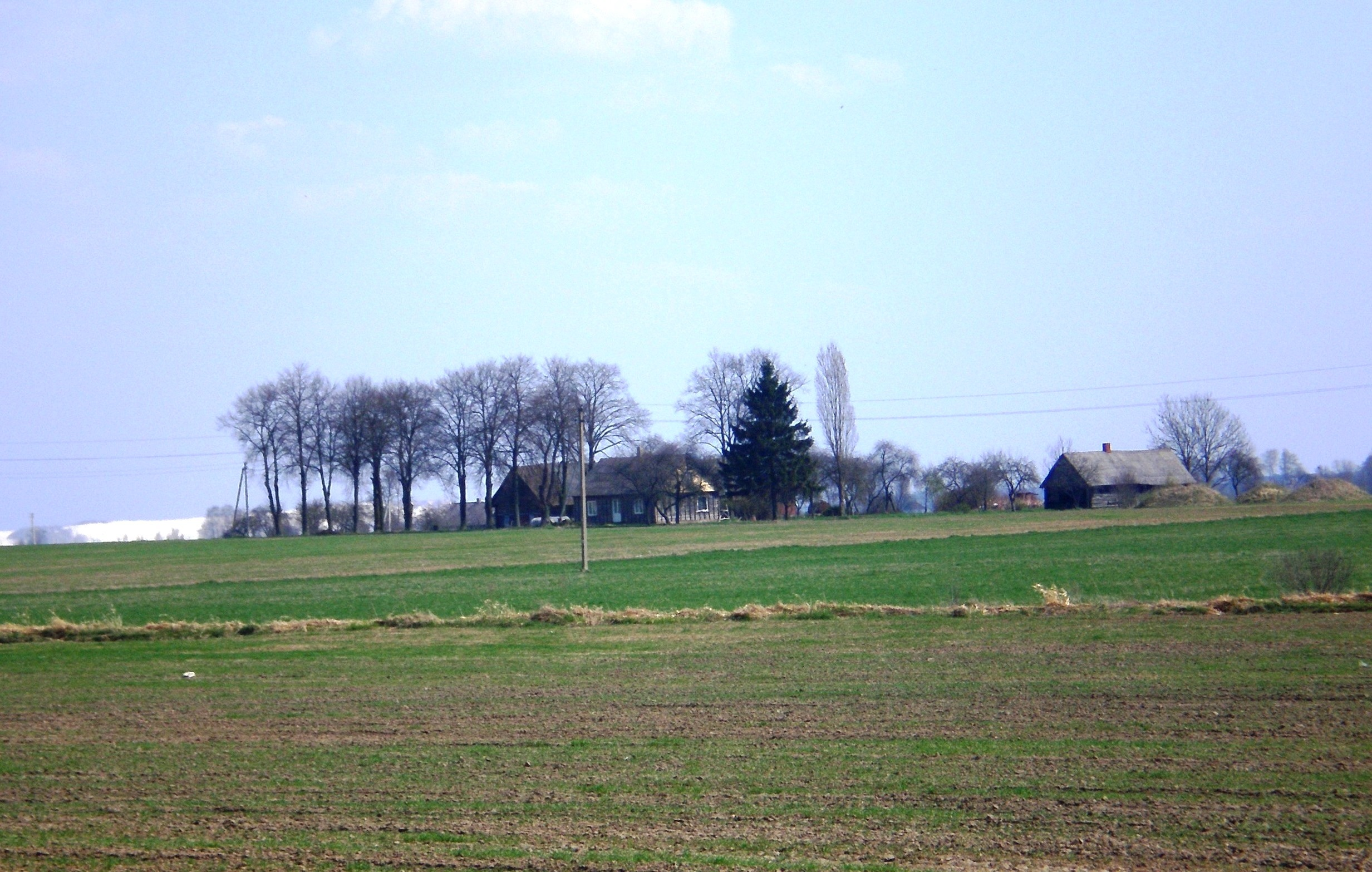
Šingaliai homestead
