= Jasnagurka, Kėdainiai =

Jasnagurka
- Village
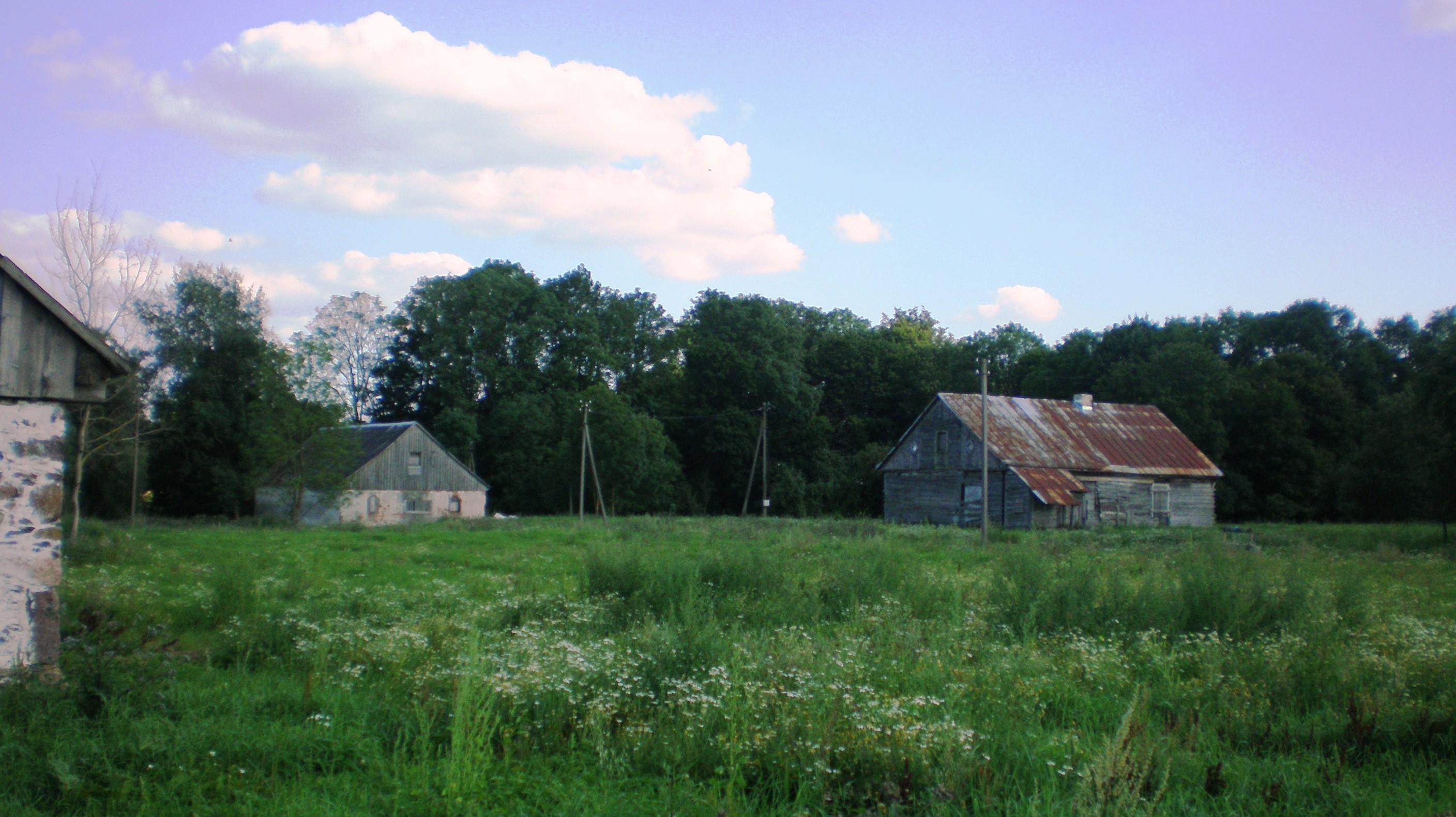

- Location in Lithuania Jasnagurka (Lithuania)
- Coordinates: 55°12′22″N 23°51′00″E
- Country: Lithuania
- County: Kaunas County
- Municipality: Kėdainiai district municipality
- Eldership: Josvainiai Eldership

Population (2011)
  - Total: 0
- Time zone: UTC+2 (EET)
  - Summer (DST): UTC+3 (EEST)

Jasnagurka (formerly Polish: Jasnogórka 'clear hill') is a village in Kėdainiai district municipality, in Kaunas County, in central Lithuania. According to the 2011 census, the village was uninhabited. It is located 1.5 kilometres (0.93 mi) from Kunioniai, on the right bank of the Šušvė river in the Šušvė Landscape Sanctuary. There are stone stall, lime tree alley and barn left from the former Jasnagurka manor (a culture heritage object).

At the beginning of the 20th century Jasnagurka was a landed property of Kampai Klementai and Paliepiai estates.

== Demography ==
Historical population

Year	Pop.	±% p.a.
1923	20	—
1959	15	−0.80%
1970	17	+1.14%
1979	16	−0.67%

Year	Pop.	±% p.a.
1989	7	−7.93%
2001	0	−100.00%
2011	0	0.00%

Source: 1902, 1923, 1959 & 1970, 1979, 1989, 2001, 2011

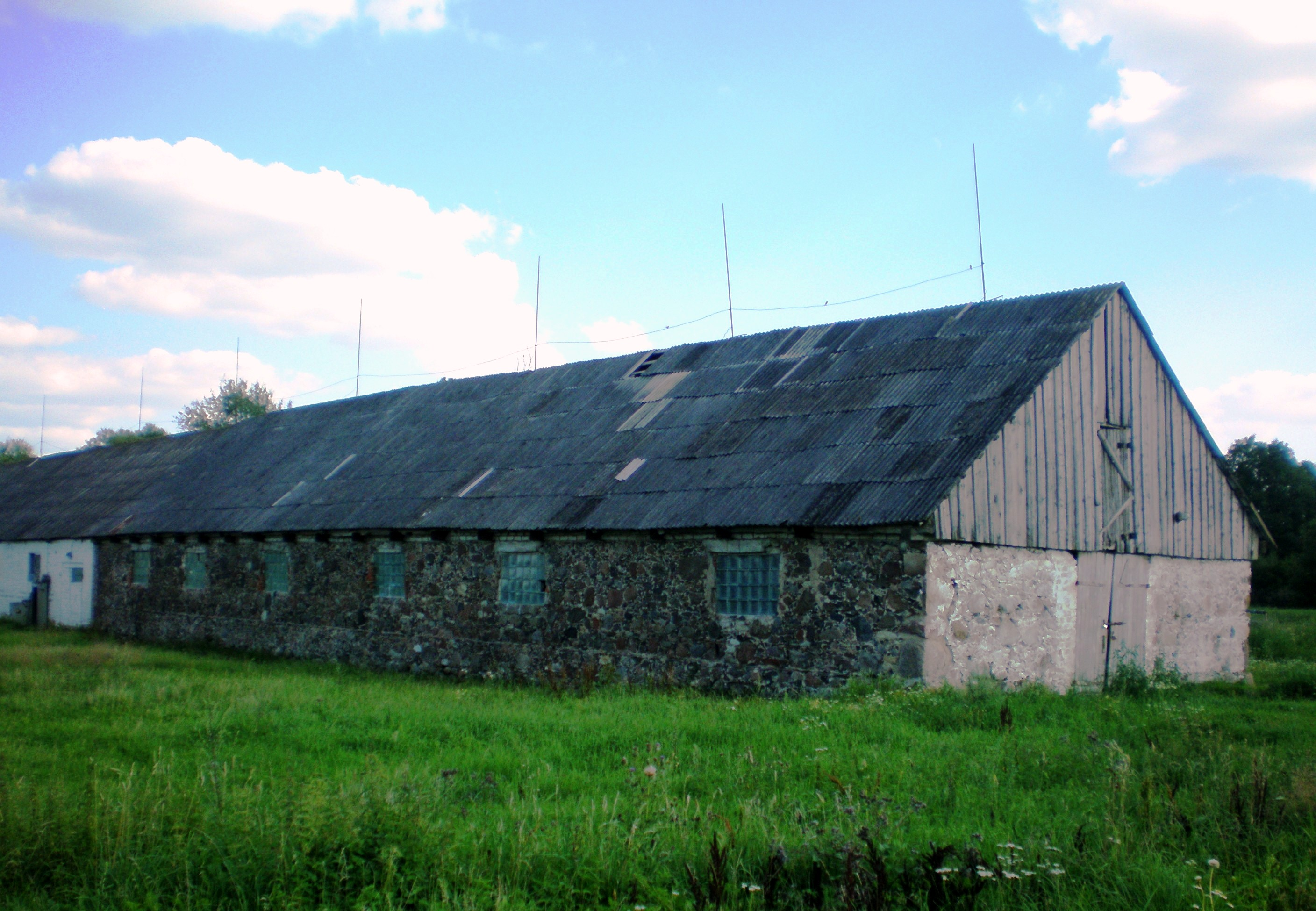
Jasnagurka manor stall
