= Pažiedupys =

- Village
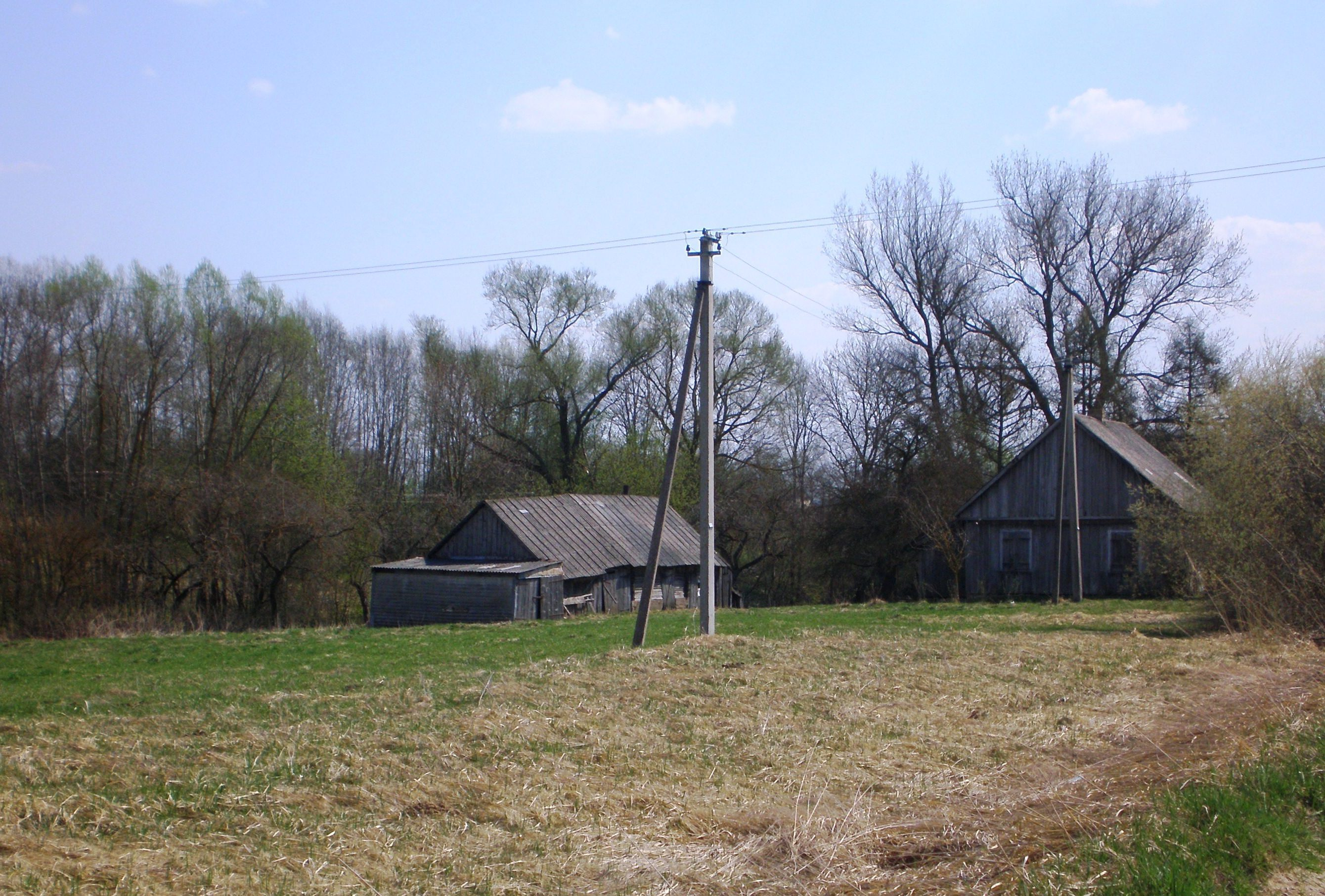

- Location in Lithuania Pažiedupys (Lithuania)
- Coordinates: 55°14′10″N 23°51′15″E
- Country: Lithuania
- County: Kaunas County
- Municipality: Kėdainiai district municipality
- Eldership: Josvainiai Eldership

Population (2011)
  - Total: 0
- Time zone: UTC+2 (EET)
  - Summer (DST): UTC+3 (EEST)

Pažiedupys (formerly Russian: Зажедуписъ) is a village in Kėdainiai district municipality, in Kaunas County, in central Lithuania. According to the 2011 census, the village was uninhabited. It is located 1 kilometre (0.62 mi) from Josvainiai, by the Žiedupė river.

== Demography ==
Historical population

Year	Pop.	±% p.a.
1902	38	—
1959	28	−0.53%
1970	16	−4.96%
1979	2	−20.63%

Year	Pop.	±% p.a.
1989	0	−100.00%
2001	0	0.00%
2011	0	0.00%

Source: 1902, 1923, 1959 & 1970, 1979, 1989, 2001, 2011
