= Kampai II =

- Village
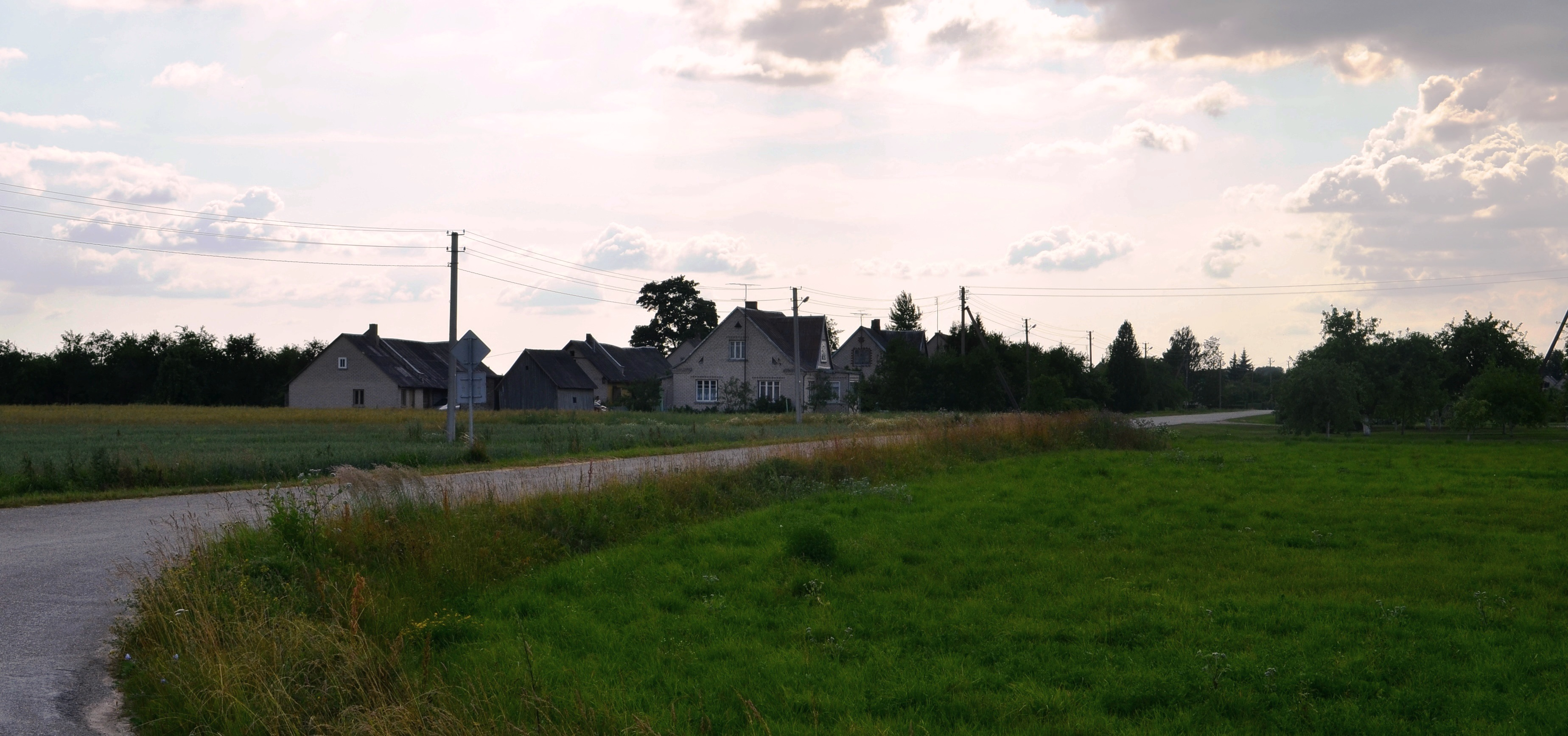

- Location in Lithuania Kampai II (Lithuania)
- Coordinates: 55°10′59″N 23°48′22″E
- Country: Lithuania
- County: Kaunas County
- Municipality: Kėdainiai district municipality
- Eldership: Josvainiai Eldership

Population (2011)
  - Total: 109
- Time zone: UTC+2 (EET)
  - Summer (DST): UTC+3 (EEST)

Kampai II (Kampai 2nd, formerly Russian: Компы, Polish: Kompy, Kąpy) is a village in Kėdainiai district municipality, in Kaunas County, in central Lithuania. According to the 2011 census, the village had a population of 109 people. It is located 3 kilometres (1.9 mi) from Kunioniai, by the Putnupys river, next to Kampai I village.

== History ==
At the beginning of the 20th there were four okolicas of Kampai. From two of them - Kampai Kondratiniai and Kampai Tucevičiai - Kampai II village has been created at 1950s.

== Demography ==
Historical population

Year	Pop.	±% p.a.
1902	220	—
1923	131	−2.44%
1959	102	−0.69%
1970	97	−0.46%

Year	Pop.	±% p.a.
1979	138	+3.99%
1989	122	−1.22%
2001	120	−0.14%
2011	109	−0.96%

Source: 1902, 1923, 1959 & 1970, 1979, 1989, 2001, 2011

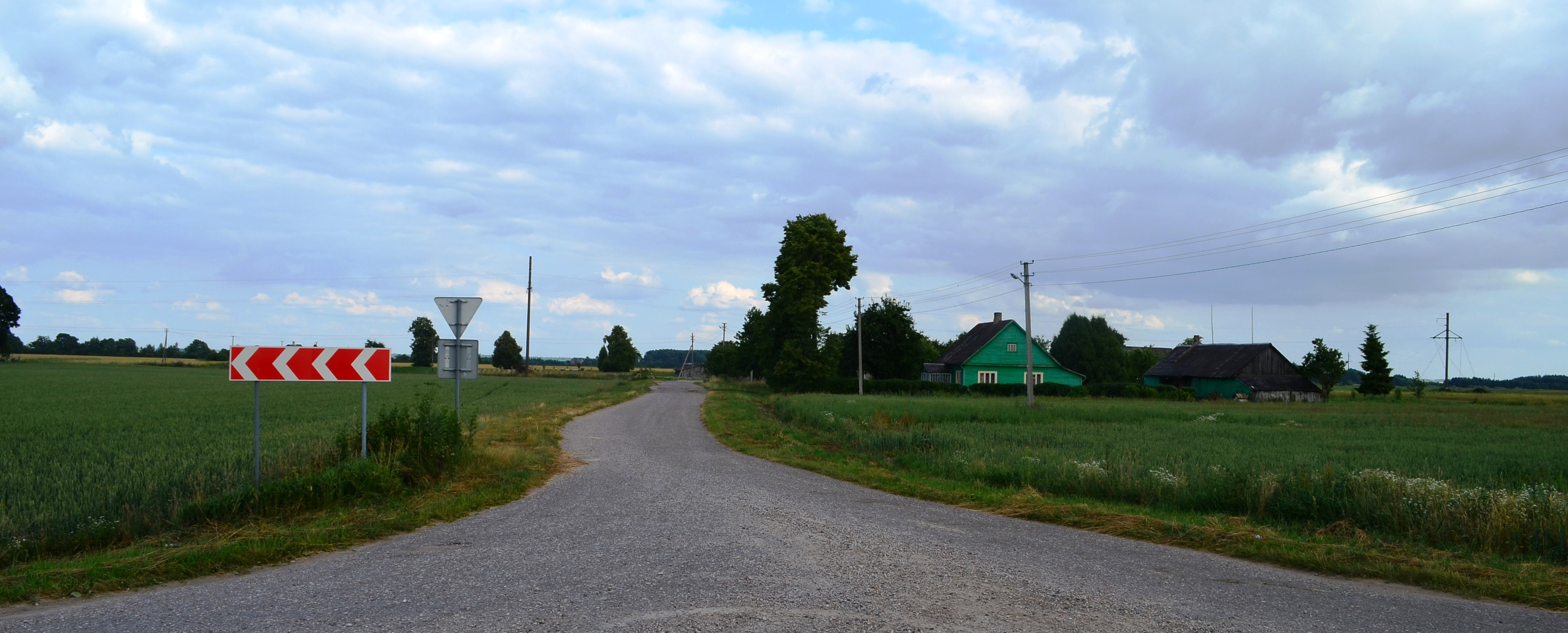
A road to Panevėžiukas in Kampai II
