= Josvainiai (village) =

- Village
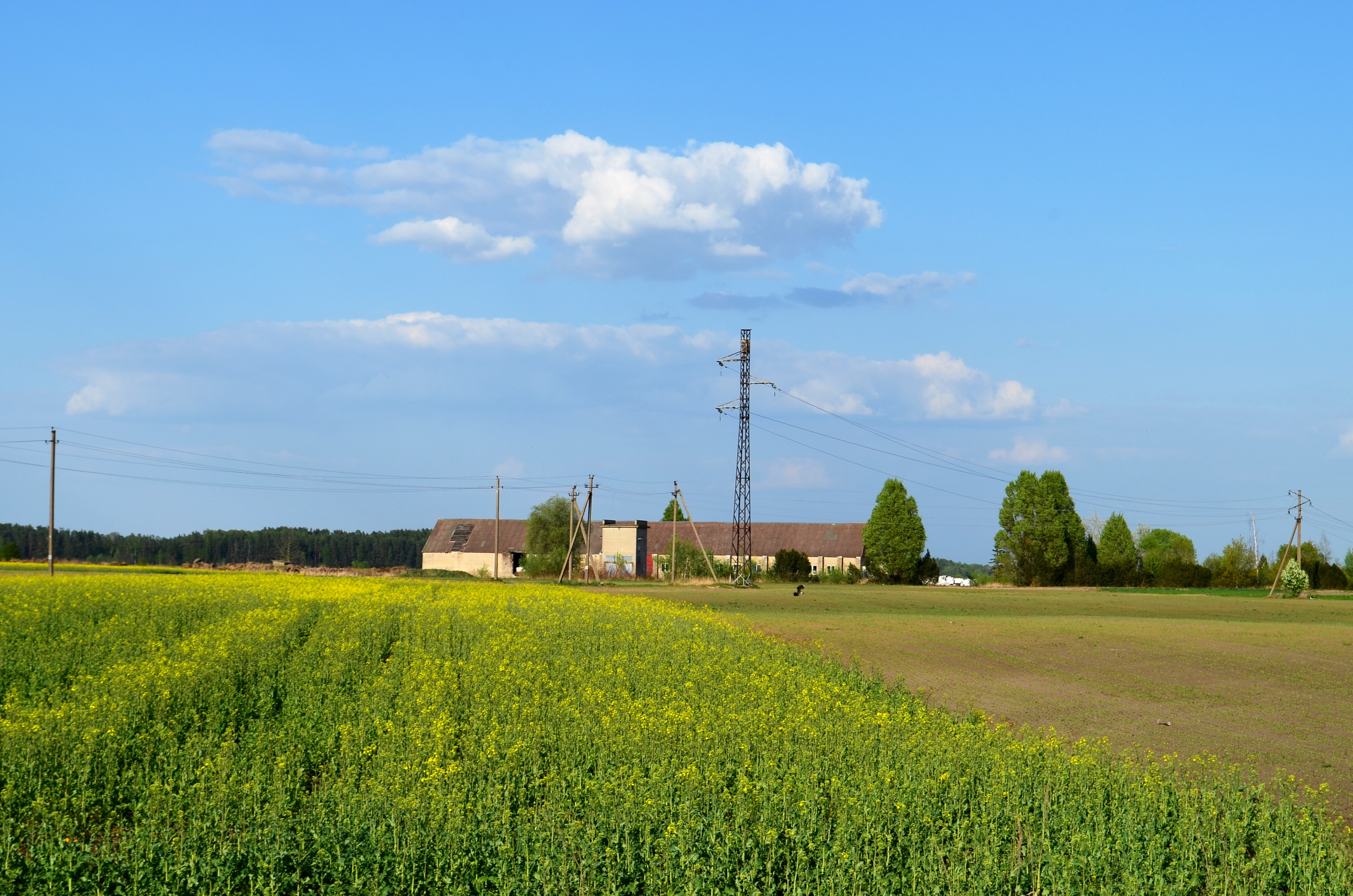

- Location in Lithuania Josvainiai (Lithuania)
- Coordinates: 55°15′22″N 23°50′20″E
- Country: Lithuania
- County: Kaunas County
- Municipality: Kėdainiai district municipality
- Eldership: Josvainiai Eldership

Population (2011)
  - Total: 55
- Time zone: UTC+2 (EET)
  - Summer (DST): UTC+3 (EEST)

Josvainiai (formerly Josvainiai Bobiliai) is a village in Kėdainiai district municipality, in Kaunas County, in central Lithuania. According to the 2011 census, the village had a population of 55 people. It covers an area next to the northwestern limit of Josvainiai town, nearby the Josvainiai Forest. There are nursery garden, petrol station, some agriculture companies.

Between 1950s and 1970s there were two villages, Josvainiai I (Josvainiai 1st) and Josvainiai II (Josvainiai 2nd).

== Demography ==
Historical population

Year	Pop.	±% p.a.
1923	174	—
1959	309	+1.61%
1970	213	−3.33%
1979	81	−10.19%

Year	Pop.	±% p.a.
1989	51	−4.52%
2001	60	+1.36%
2011	55	−0.87%

Source: 1902, 1923, 1959 & 1970, 1979, 1989, 2001, 2011
