= Upytė (river in Kėdainiai District Municipality) =

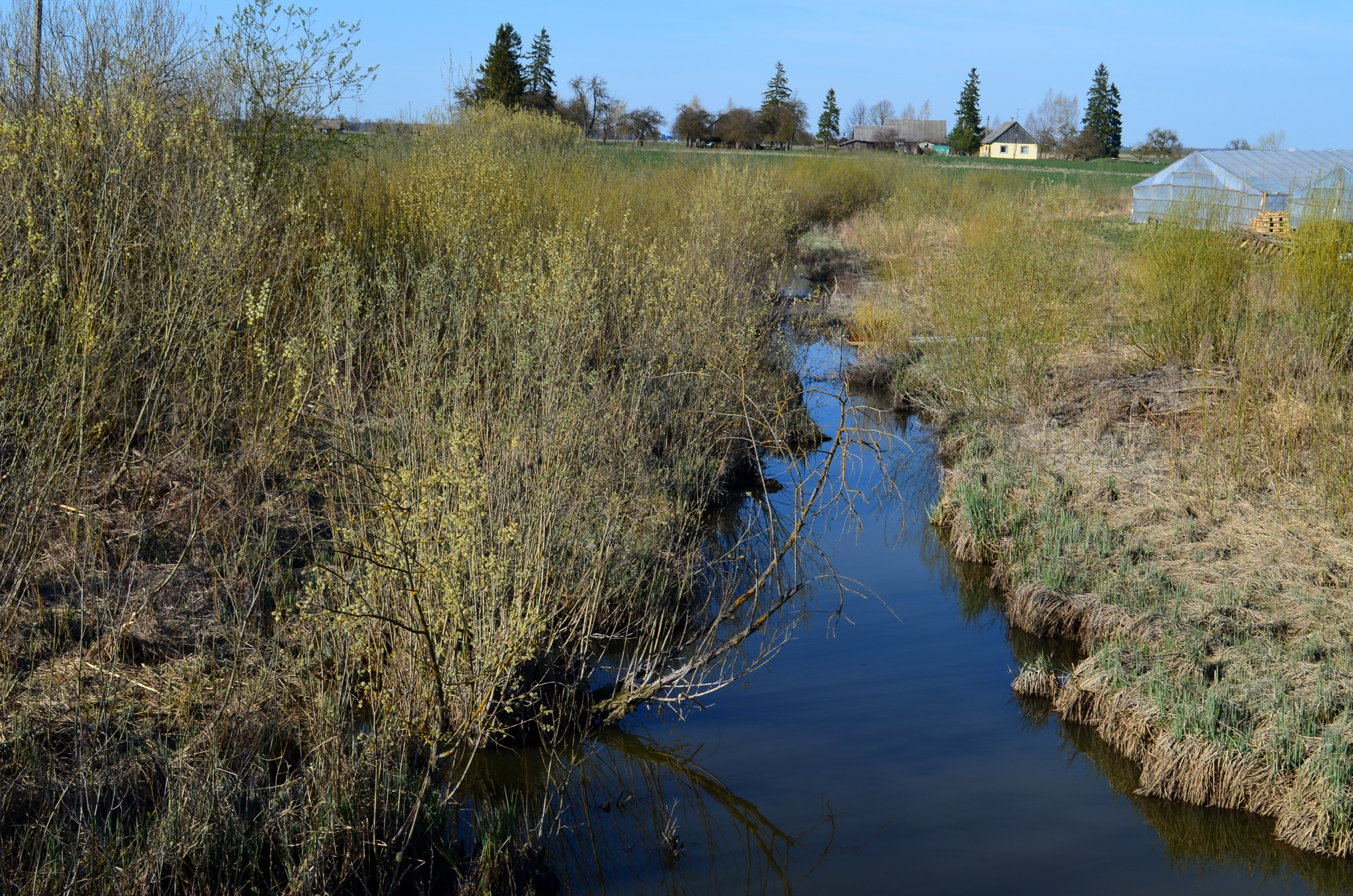
- Upytė in Karūnava

Location
- Country: Lithuania
- Region: Kėdainiai district municipality, Kaunas County

Physical characteristics
- Source
  - location: Near Galulaukiai
  - coordinates: 55.2459°N 23.8980°E
- Mouth: Šušvė nearby Vainikai
  - coordinates: 55.2155°N 23.9105°E
- Length: 5.6 km (3.5 mi)
- Basin size: 8.4 km^{2} (3.2 sq mi)

Basin features
- Progression: Nevėžis→ Neman→ Baltic Sea
- Tributaries
  - right: Gilasys

The Upytė is a river of Kėdainiai district municipality, Kaunas County, central Lithuania. It flows for 5.6 kilometres (3.5 mi) and has a basin area of 8.4 km^{2} (3.2 sq mi). It is a right tributary of the river Nevėžis.

It begins nearby Galulaukiai village. It flows mostly southwards and meets the Nevėžis between Karūnava and Vainikai villages. A little pond is dammed on the Upytė in Karūnava.

The name Upytė in Lithuanian means 'little river, rivulet'.
