= Putnupys =

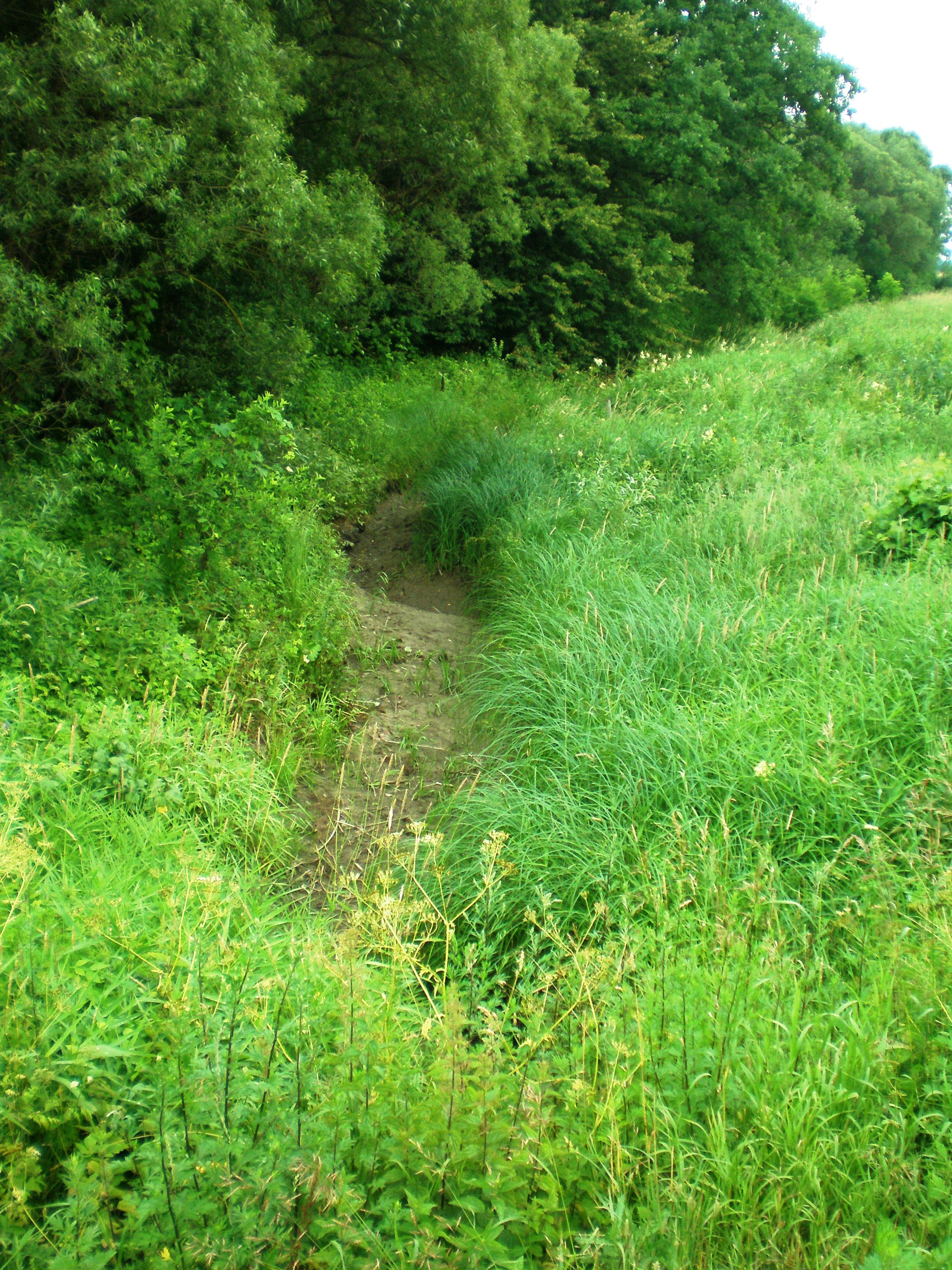
- Dry Putnupys river bed near Prapuoleniai

Location
- Country: Lithuania
- Region: Kėdainiai district municipality, Kaunas County

Physical characteristics
- Source
  - location: Pernarava-Šaravai Forest
- Mouth: Šušvė nearby Kampai I
  - coordinates: 55.1847°N 23.8275°E
- Length: 10.9 km (6.8 mi)
- Basin size: 16.8 km^{2} (6.5 sq mi)

Basin features
- Progression: Šušvė→ Nevėžis→ Neman→ Baltic Sea
- Tributaries
  - left: Slajus

The Putnupys is a river of Kėdainiai district municipality, Kaunas County, central Lithuania. It flows for 10.9 kilometres (6.8 mi) and has a basin area of 16.8 km^{2} (6.5 sq mi). It originates in the Pernarava-Šaravai Forest, 3 km from Skaistgiriai village. The Putnupys flows to the south east, at first through the forest, later through the agriculture fields. It meets the Šušvė from the right side near Kampai I village.

The Putnupys pond of 4.8 hectares (12 acres) is made nearby the river mouth. The river passes through Būdai, Prapuoleniai, Kampai II, Kampai I villages.

The name Putnupys possibly comes from the Lithuanian suriname Putna.
