= Karūnava =

- Village
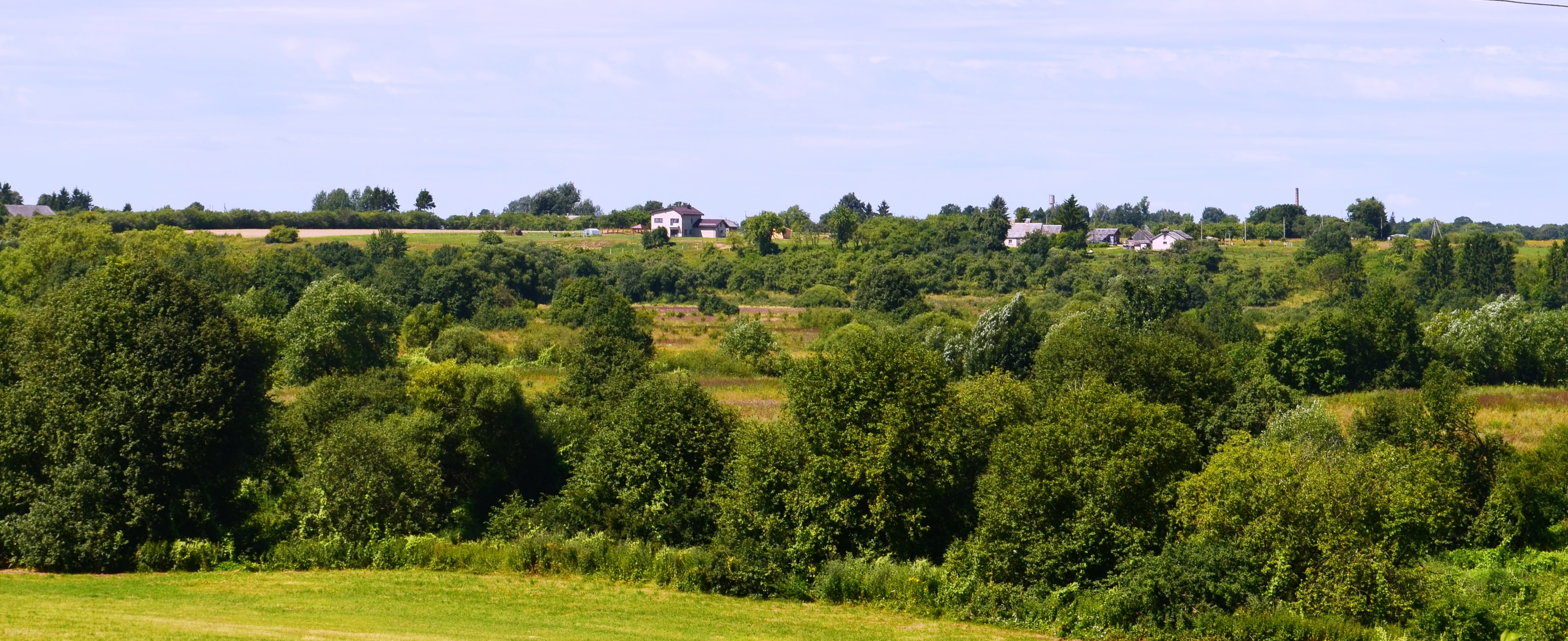

- Location in Lithuania Karūnava (Lithuania)
- Coordinates: 55°13′59″N 23°55′19″E
- Country: Lithuania
- County: Kaunas County
- Municipality: Kėdainiai district municipality
- Eldership: Josvainiai Eldership

Population (2011)
  - Total: 54
- Time zone: UTC+2 (EET)
  - Summer (DST): UTC+3 (EEST)

Karūnava (formerly Russian: Короново, Polish: Koronów) is a village in Kėdainiai district municipality, in Kaunas County, in central Lithuania. According to the 2011 census, the village had a population of 54 people. It is located 3 kilometres (1.9 mi) from Pelėdnagiai, on the right bank of the Nevėžis river, in front of Pašiliai, nearby the Nevėžis' tributary the Upytė river.

== History ==
The first mention of Karūnava (as Kralinowe) is known from "Livonian Chronicle" of Hermann von Wartberge, written in 1392.

At the end of the 19th there was Karūnava village and manor (a property of the Statkowski family).

== Demography ==
Historical population

| Year | Pop. | ±% p.a. |
|---|---|---|
| 1902 | 349 | — |
| 1923 | 334 | −0.21% |
| 1959 | 213 | −1.24% |
| 1970 | 188 | −1.13% |

| Year | Pop. | ±% p.a. |
|---|---|---|
| 1979 | 116 | −5.22% |
| 1989 | 75 | −4.27% |
| 2001 | 54 | −2.70% |
| 2011 | 54 | +0.00% |

Source: 1902, 1923, 1959 & 1970, 1979, 1989, 2001, 2011
