= Kunioniai =

- Village
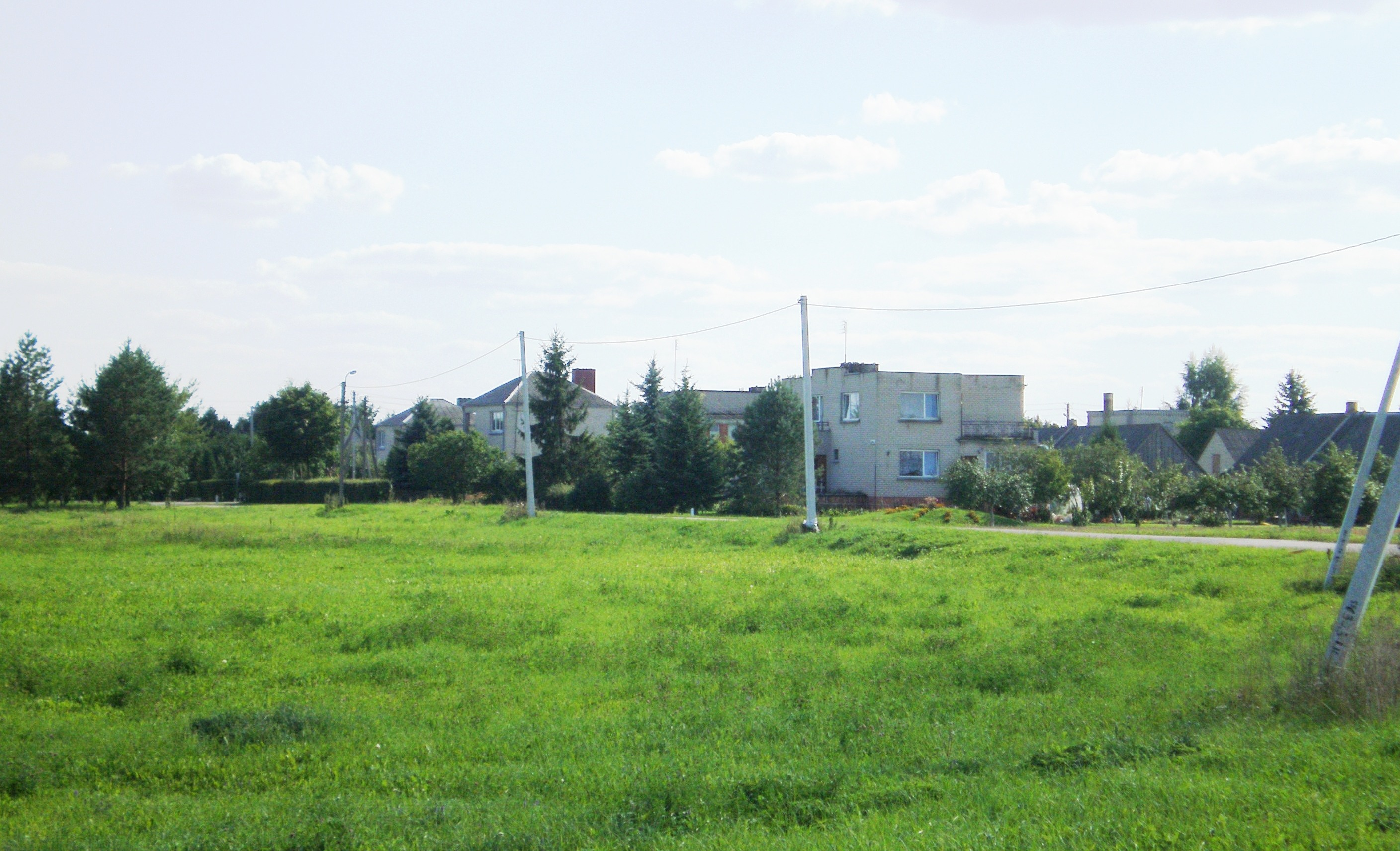

- Location in Lithuania Kunioniai (Lithuania)
- Coordinates: 55°12′22″N 23°49′30″E
- Country: Lithuania
- County: Kaunas County
- Municipality: Kėdainiai district municipality
- Eldership: Josvainiai Eldership

Population (2011)
  - Total: 321
- Time zone: UTC+2 (EET)
  - Summer (DST): UTC+3 (EEST)

Kunioniai (Kunionys, formerly Russian: Куняны, Polish: Kuniany) is a village in Kėdainiai district municipality, in Kaunas County, in central Lithuania. According to the 2011 census, the village had a population of 321 people. It is located 5 kilometres (3.1 mi) from Josvainiai, nearby the Šušvė river, by the Josvainiai-Kampai II road. There are library, agriculture companies, farms. Former Jasnagurka manor is located next to Kunioniai.

== History ==
Kunioniai is known since 1593. It developed alongside the ancient road to Kaunas and probably belonged to the Josvainiai manor. There was a small Jewish community which hosted a tavern, distillated vodka and baked cakes. There was a watermill on the Vikšrupis river and four wooden crosses made by Vincas Svirskis (did not survive till nowadays). The first school was opened in 1929. During the Soviet era Kunioniai was a kolkhoz center. Between 1950 and 1988 it was a Kunioniai selsovet center.

== Demography ==
Historical population

Year	Pop.	±% p.a.
1820	128	—
1892	295	+1.17%
1902	295	+0.00%
1923	141	−3.45%
1959	231	+1.38%
1970	193	−1.62%

Year	Pop.	±% p.a.
1979	321	+5.82%
1985	409	+4.12%
1989	475	+3.81%
2001	545	+1.15%
2011	321	−5.16%

Source: 1902, 1923, 1959 & 1970, 1979, 1989, 2001, 2011
