= Kampai I =

- Village
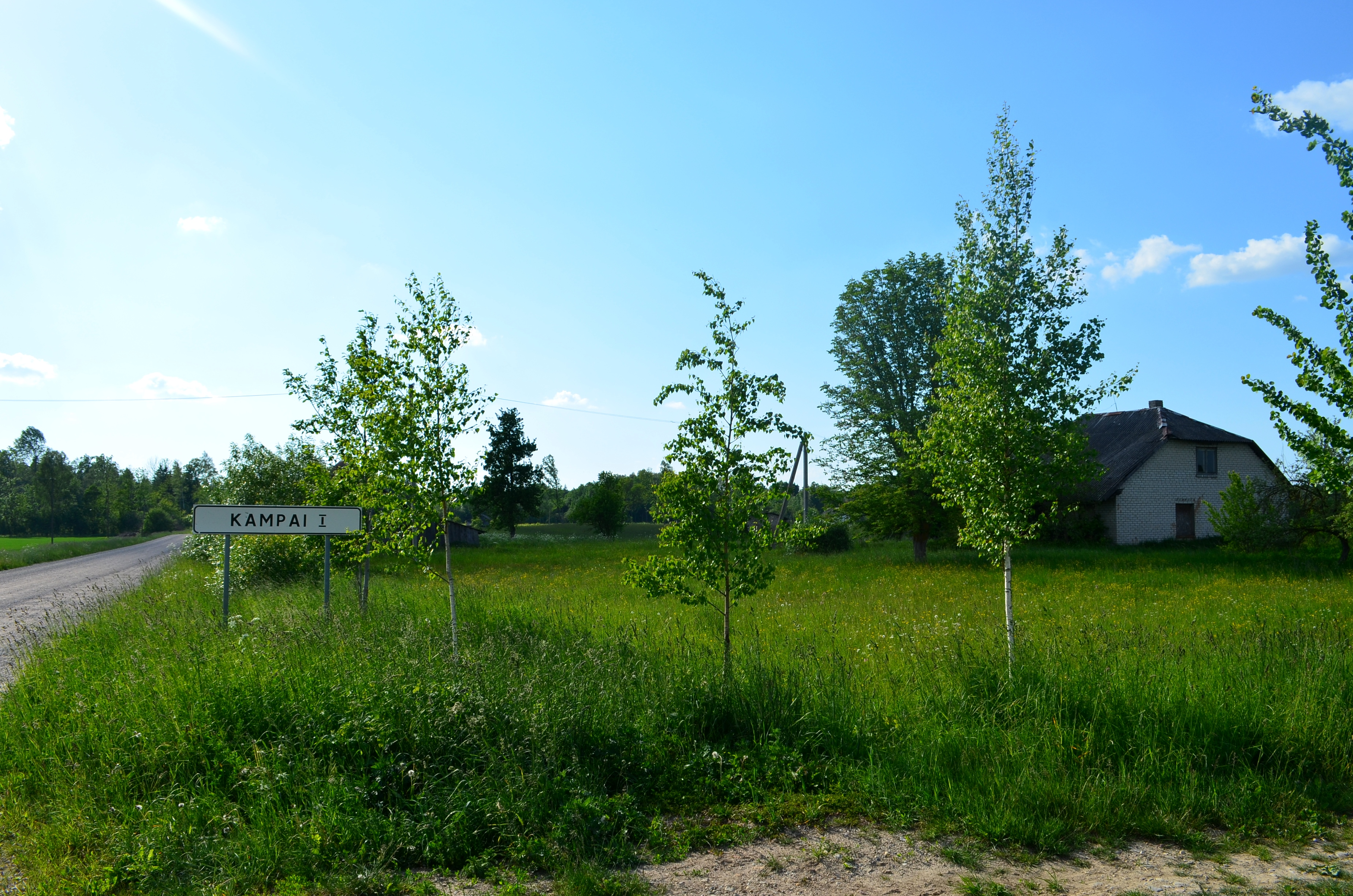

- Location in Lithuania Kampai I (Lithuania)
- Coordinates: 55°11′20″N 23°49′30″E
- Country: Lithuania
- County: Kaunas County
- Municipality: Kėdainiai district municipality
- Eldership: Josvainiai Eldership

Population (2011)
  - Total: 9
- Time zone: UTC+2 (EET)
  - Summer (DST): UTC+3 (EEST)

Kampai I (Kampai 1st, formerly Russian: Компы, Polish: Kompy, Kąpy) is a village in Kėdainiai district municipality, in Kaunas County, in central Lithuania. According to the 2011 census, the village had a population of nine people. It is located 2 kilometres (1.2 mi) from Kunioniai, by the Šušvė river and its tributary the Putnupys (and its pond). The road 229 Aristava-Kėdainiai-Cinkiškiai goes through the western limit of the village.

== History ==
At the beginning of the 20th there were four okolicas of Kampai. From two of them - Kampai Klementai and Kampai Motiejūnai - Kampai I village has been created at 1950s.

== Demography ==
Historical population

Year	Pop.	±% p.a.
1902	103	—
1959	68	−0.73%
1970	45	−3.68%
1979	19	−9.14%

Year	Pop.	±% p.a.
1989	10	−6.22%
2001	14	+2.84%
2011	9	−4.32%

Source: 1902, 1923, 1959 & 1970, 1979, 1989, 2001, 2011

== Images ==
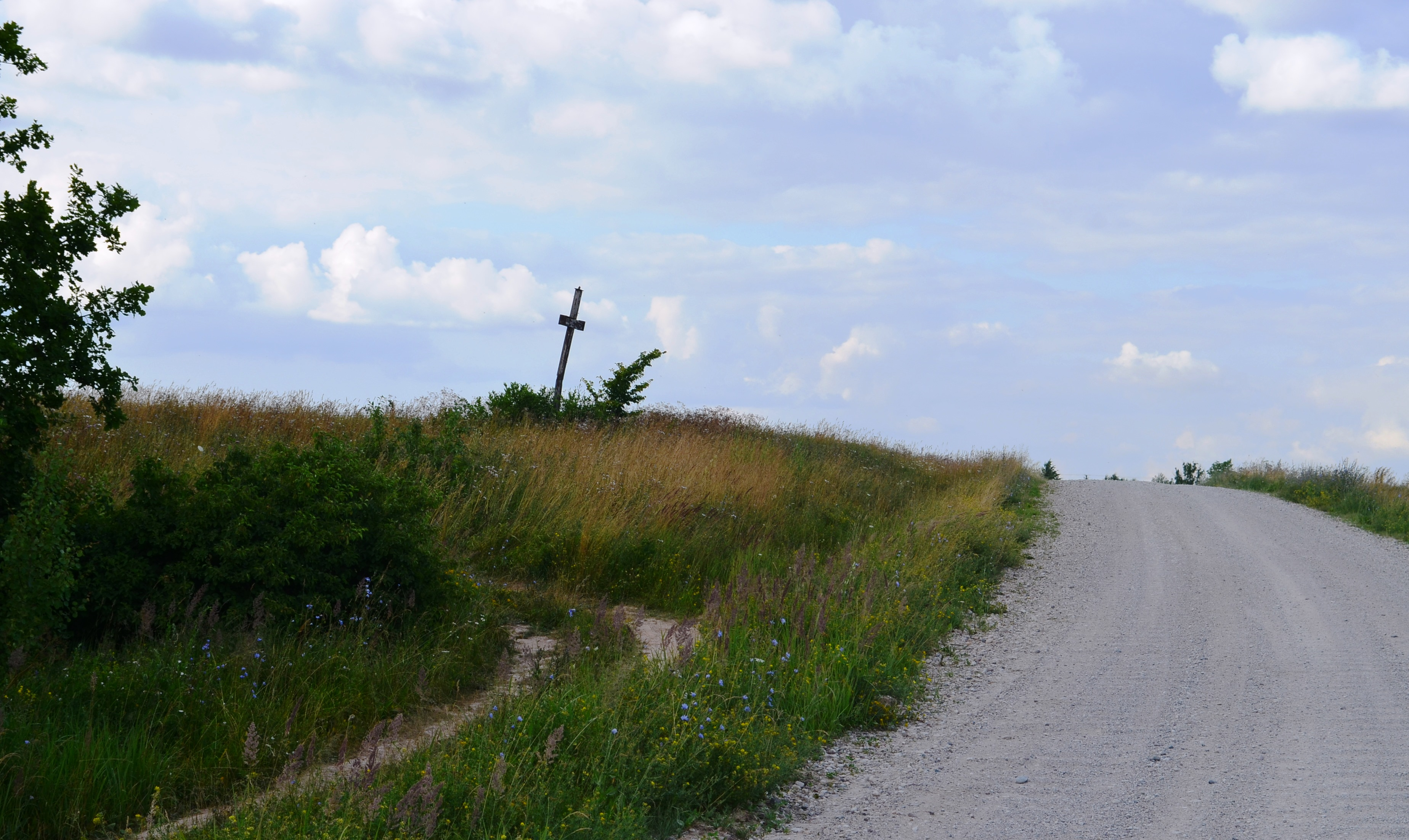
Wayside cross in Kampai I

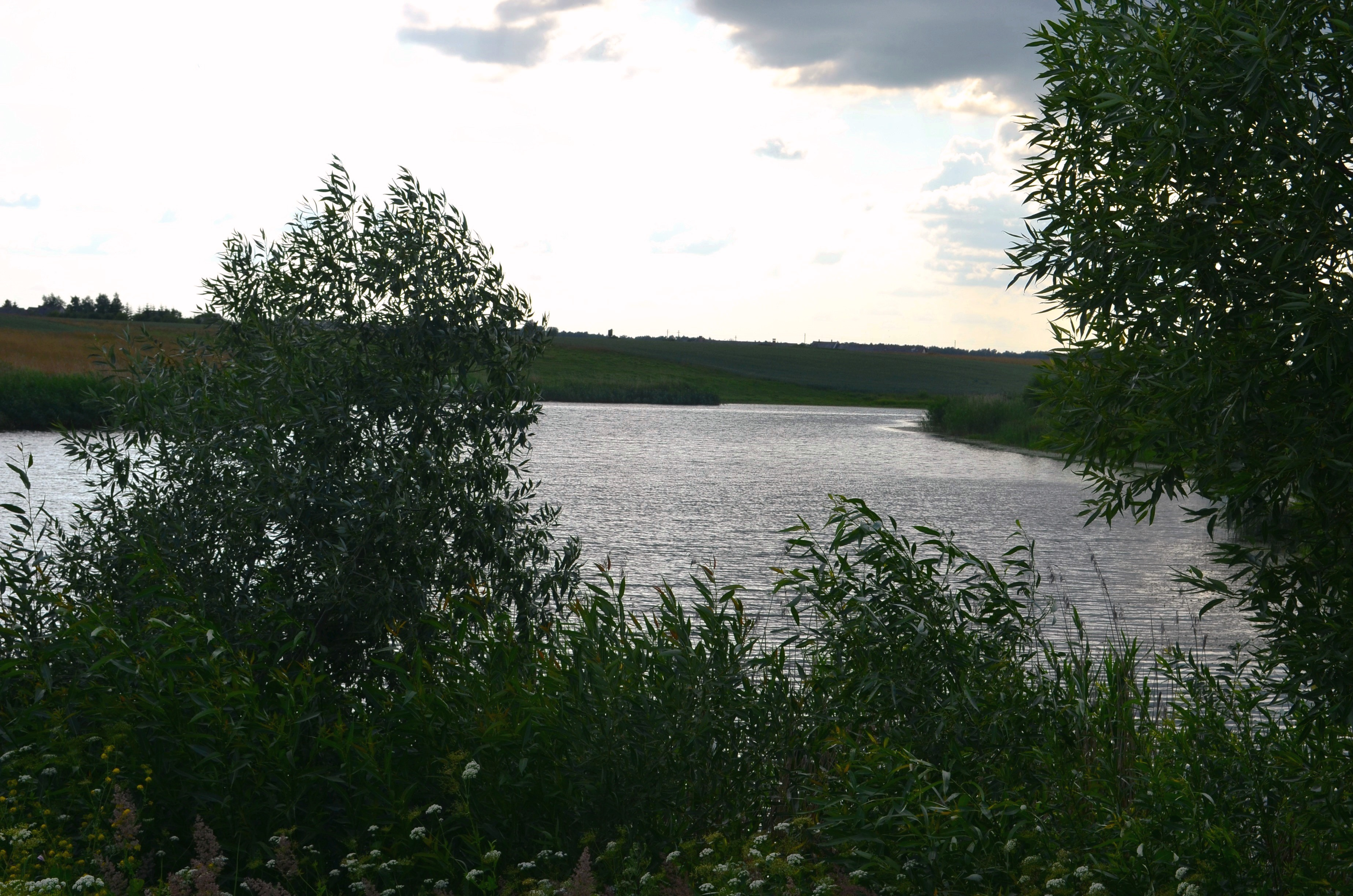
Putnupys pond

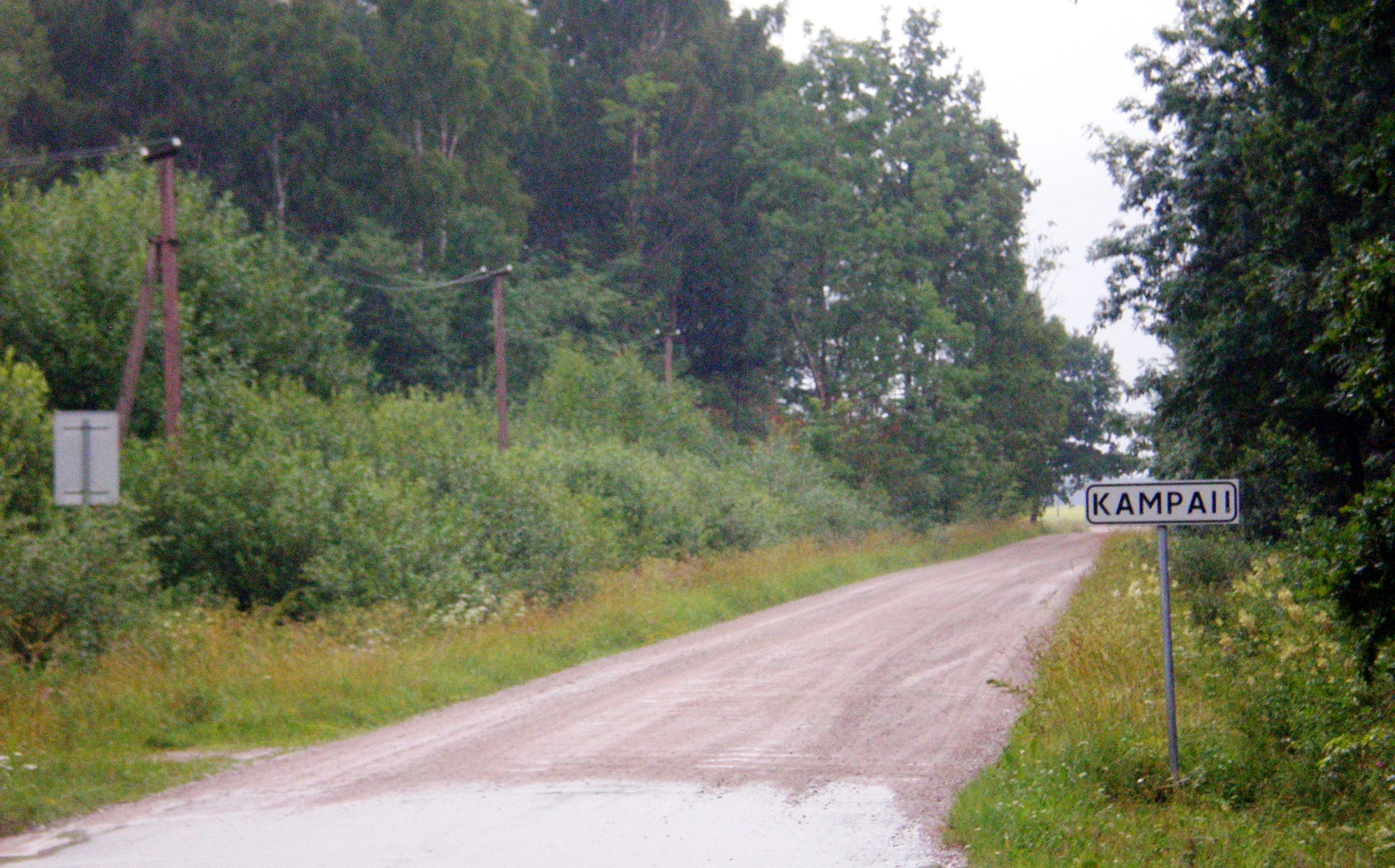
Entrance sign of Kampai I
