= Campae =

Town of ancient Cappadocia

Coordinates: 38°48′03″N 35°01′27″E

Campae or Kampai (Ancient Greek: Κάμπαι) was a town of ancient Cappadocia, inhabited during Roman and Byzantine times. In the Tabula Peutingeriana it is listed as Cambe and positioned 16 M.P. north or northwest from Mazaca.

Its site is tentatively located near Boğazköprü, Asiatic Turkey.
