= Josvainiai =

- Town
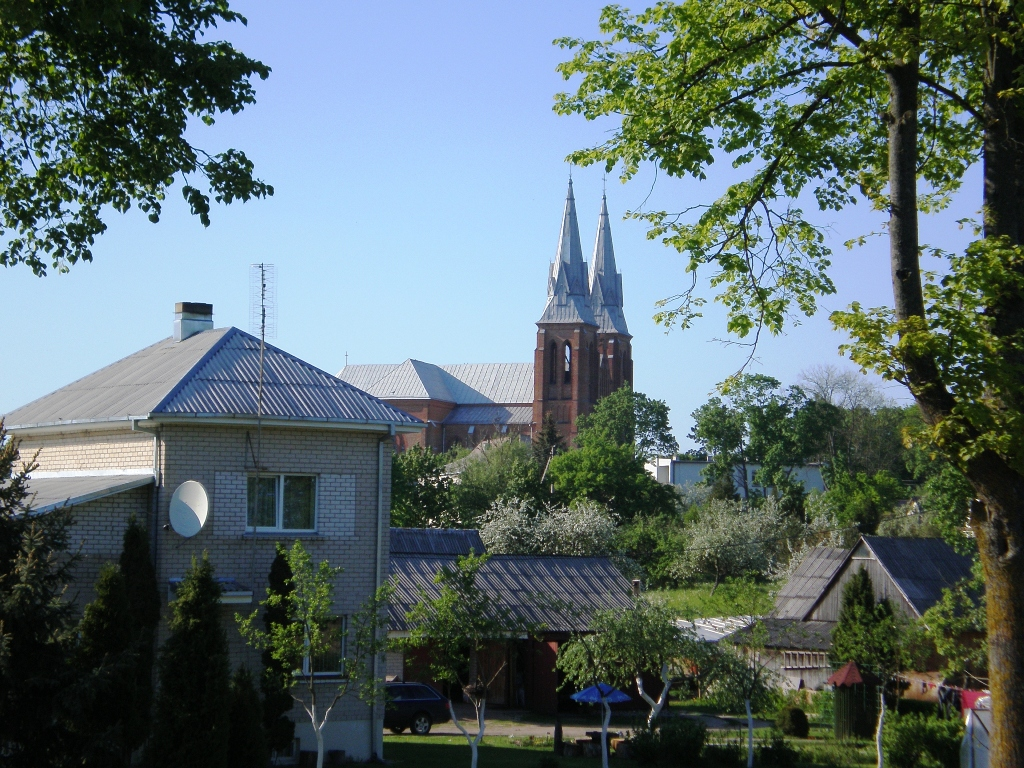

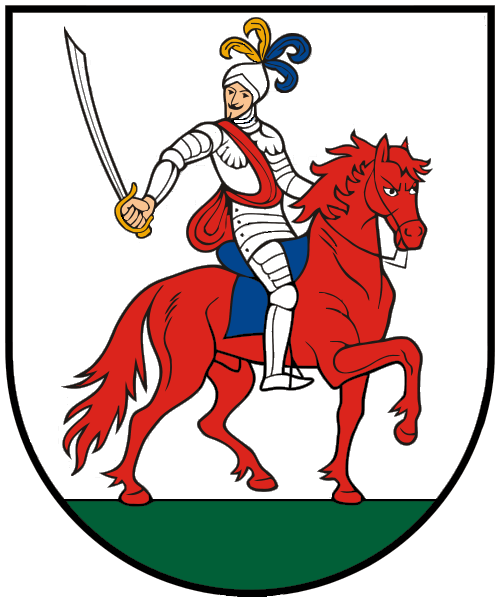
- Coat of arms

- Location within Lithuania Location within Kėdainiai District Municipality
- Coordinates: 55°14′50″N 23°50′00″E
- Country: Lithuania
- Ethnographic region: Aukštaitija
- County: Kaunas County
- Municipality: Kėdainiai district municipality
- Eldership: Josvainiai Eldership
- Capital of: Josvainiai eldership
- First mentioned: 1486
- Granted city rights: March 29, 1792

Population (2021)
  - Total: 1,122
- Time zone: UTC+2 (EET)
  - Summer (DST): UTC+3 (EEST)

Josvainiai is a small town in Kėdainiai district in central Lithuania. It is located on the Šušvė River, 10 km southwest from Kėdainiai. The town comprises the Neo-Gothic Catholic All Saints Church, a gymnasium, a clinic, a post office, a public library, a stud farm, and a culture house.

== Etymology ==
The name of the town derives from the hypothetical personal name Josvainis (a small river in the district of Krekenava also bears this name). The town was also previously known by its Polish name, Jaswojnie.

== History ==
In the 14th century, there was a castle in Josvainai. It was attacked many times by the Teutonic Knights during the late 14th century. In 1486 Josvainiai was mentioned as a town. During the 16th century, the royal manor of Josvainiai and the first wooden church were mentioned. From 1529 to 1567, Josvainiai was included in the list of unprivileged towns of the Grand Duchy of Lithuania. During the wars of the 17th and 18th centuries, Josvainiai castle and the surrounding village was devastated by wars.

The town was granted Magdeburg rights in 1699. Its city rights a coat of arms was reconfirmed on March 29, 1792. In 1831, during the November Uprising, Josvainiai was occupied by anti-Russian rebels. At the end of the 19th century, during the Lithuanian press ban, book smugglers were active in the area. In 1894, the town burned down.

During the Soviet occupation of Lithuania, Josvainiai was a center of a selsoviet and kolkhoz. In 1941 and again in 1947-49, 28 Lithuanian inhabitants of Josvainiai were forcibly exiled to Siberia by Soviet authorities. Following World War II, Lithuanian partisans of the Prisikėlimas military district of the Maironis Detachment were active in the outskirts of Josvainiai.

On July 19, 2006, the town was granted a renewed coat of arms by a presidential decree.

=== Jewish community ===
Jews first settled in Josvainiai in the 17th century. By 1897, 534 Jews lived in the town, making up 40% of the total population. There was a synagogue and a Jewish school. Most Jews were expelled during World War I. A large portion of the town burned down afterward. After the War, some returned. Before the Holocaust, the Jewish population was 270 and in about 70 families. They lived around the marketplace and on nearby streets. During World War II, 282 Jews were murdered in a mass execution: 86 men, 110 women, and 86 children.

== Demography ==
Historical population

Year	Pop.	±% p.a.
1833	278	—
1841	545	+8.78%
1885	605	+0.24%
1897	1,329	+6.78%

Year	Pop.	±% p.a.
1904	1,500	+1.74%
1923	1,194	−1.19%
1959	698	−1.48%
1970	728	+0.38%

Year	Pop.	±% p.a.
1977	935	+3.64%
1979	1,102	+8.56%
1985	1,392	+3.97%
1989	1,392	+0.00%

Year	Pop.	±% p.a.
2001	1,545	+0.87%
2011	1,057	−3.72%

Source: 1902, 1923, 1959 & 1970, 1979, 1989, 2001, 2011

== Gallery ==
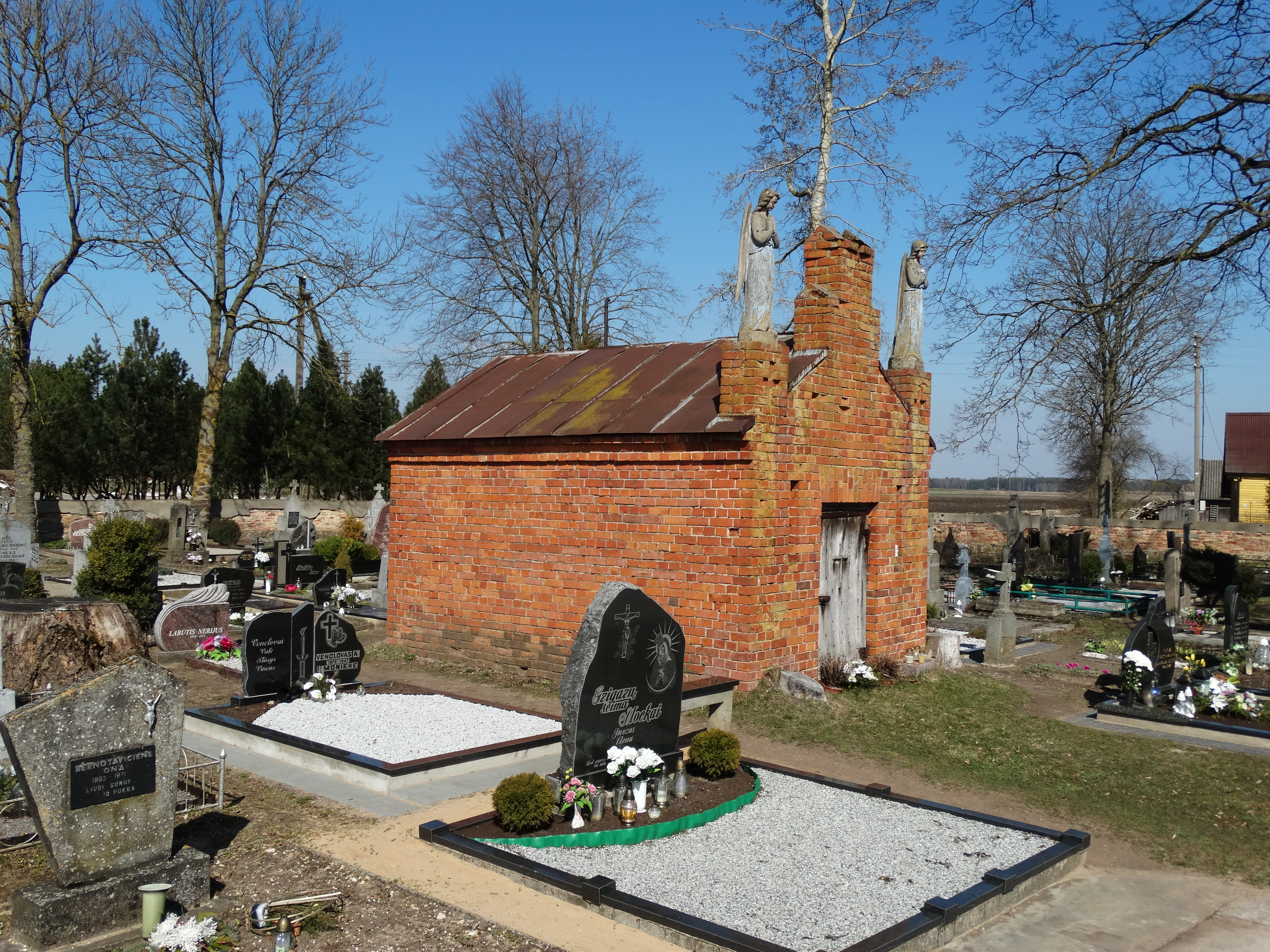
A mausoleum in the Josvainiai cemetery

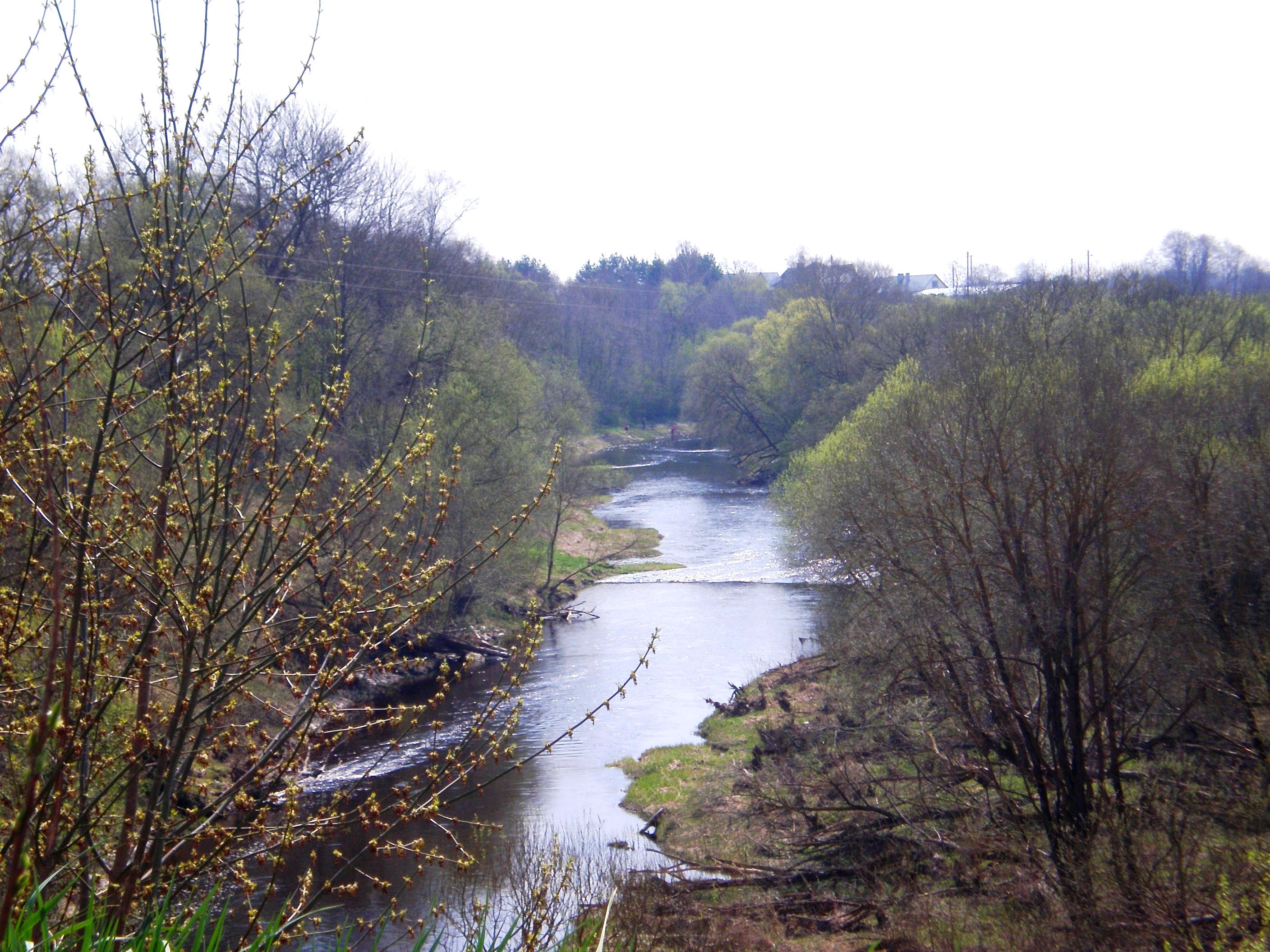
Šušvė river in Josvainiai

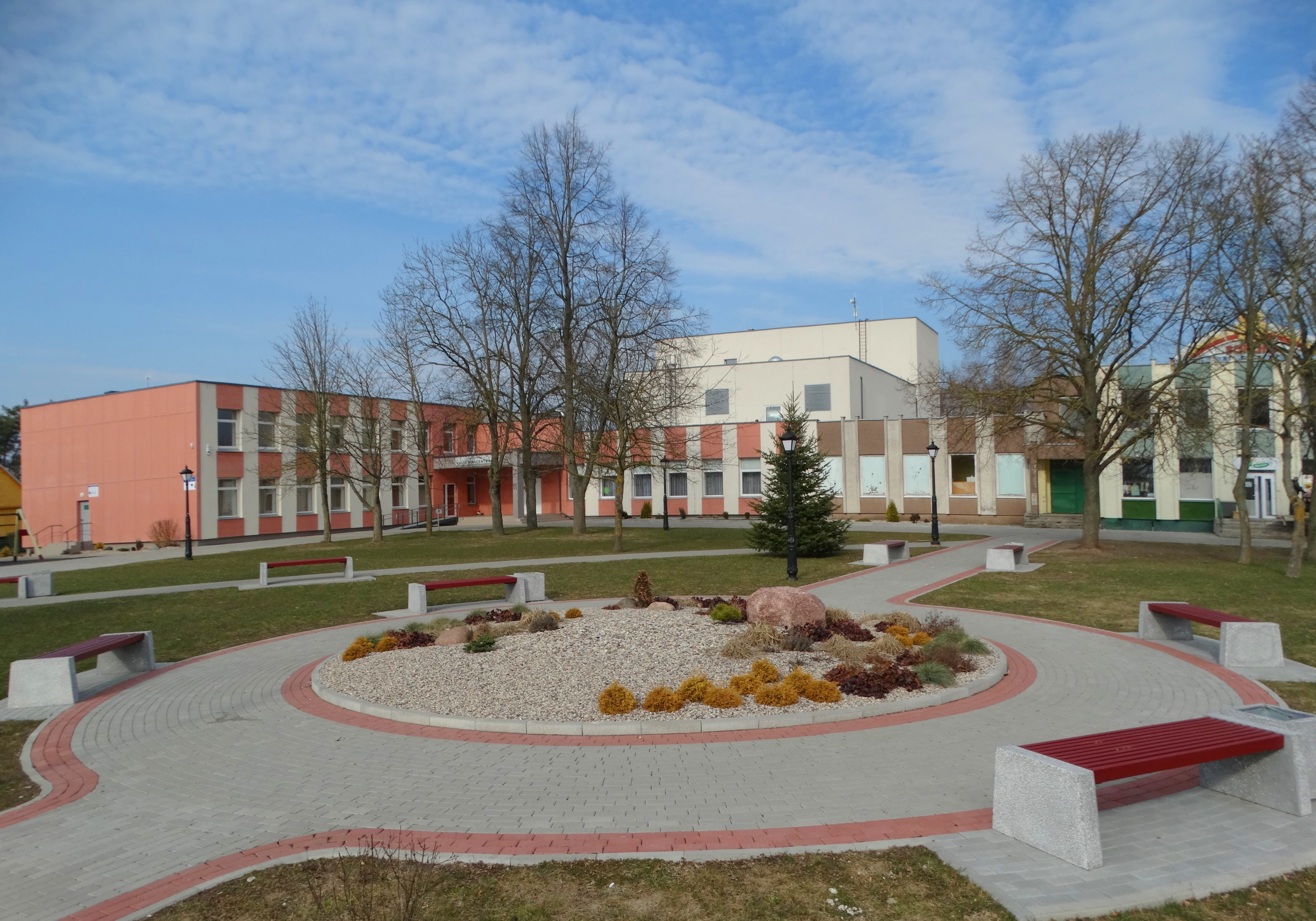
Josvainiai town center

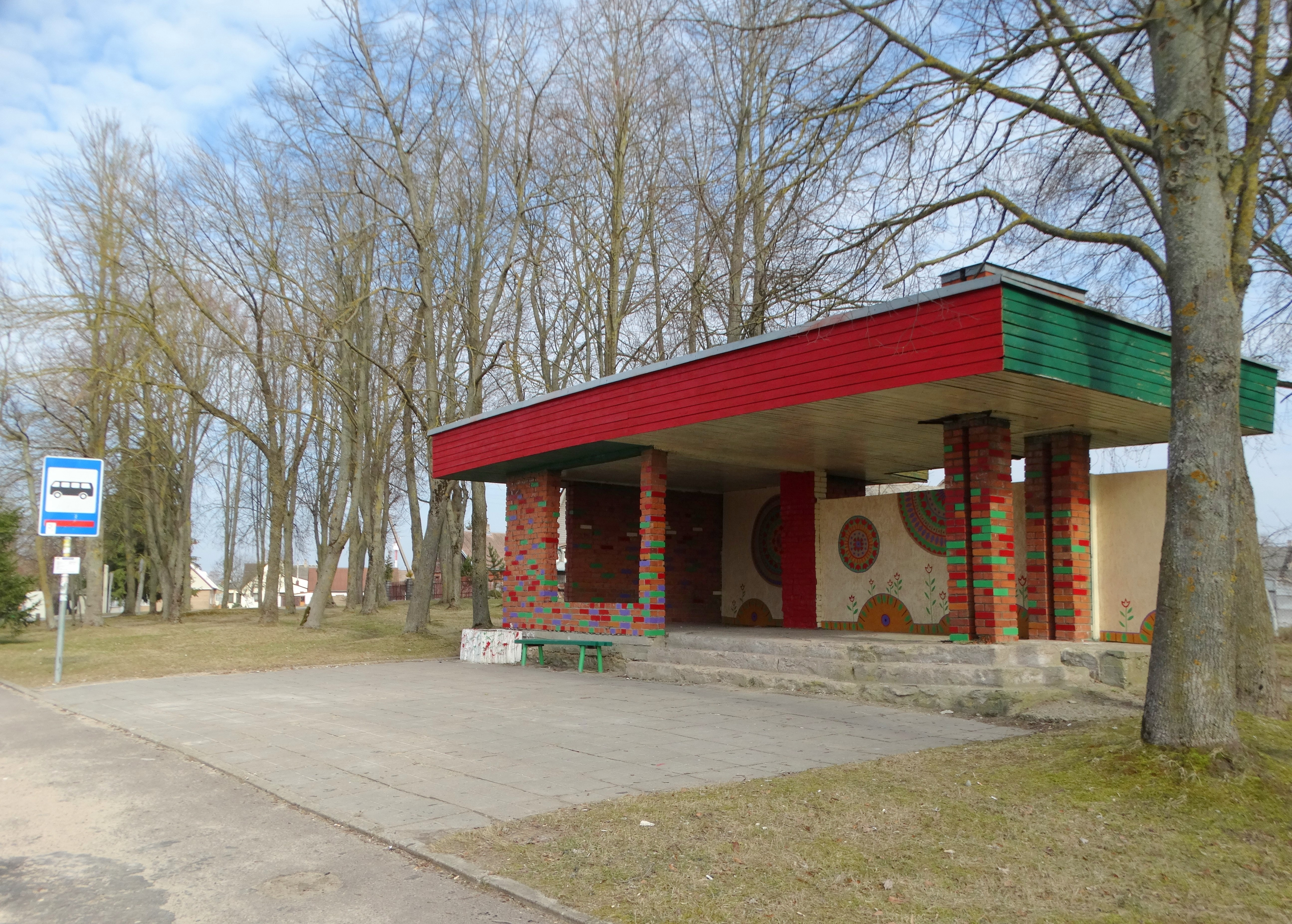
Bus stop of Josvainiai (now destroyed)
