= Dovydiškiai, Kėdainiai =

Dovydiškiai
- Village
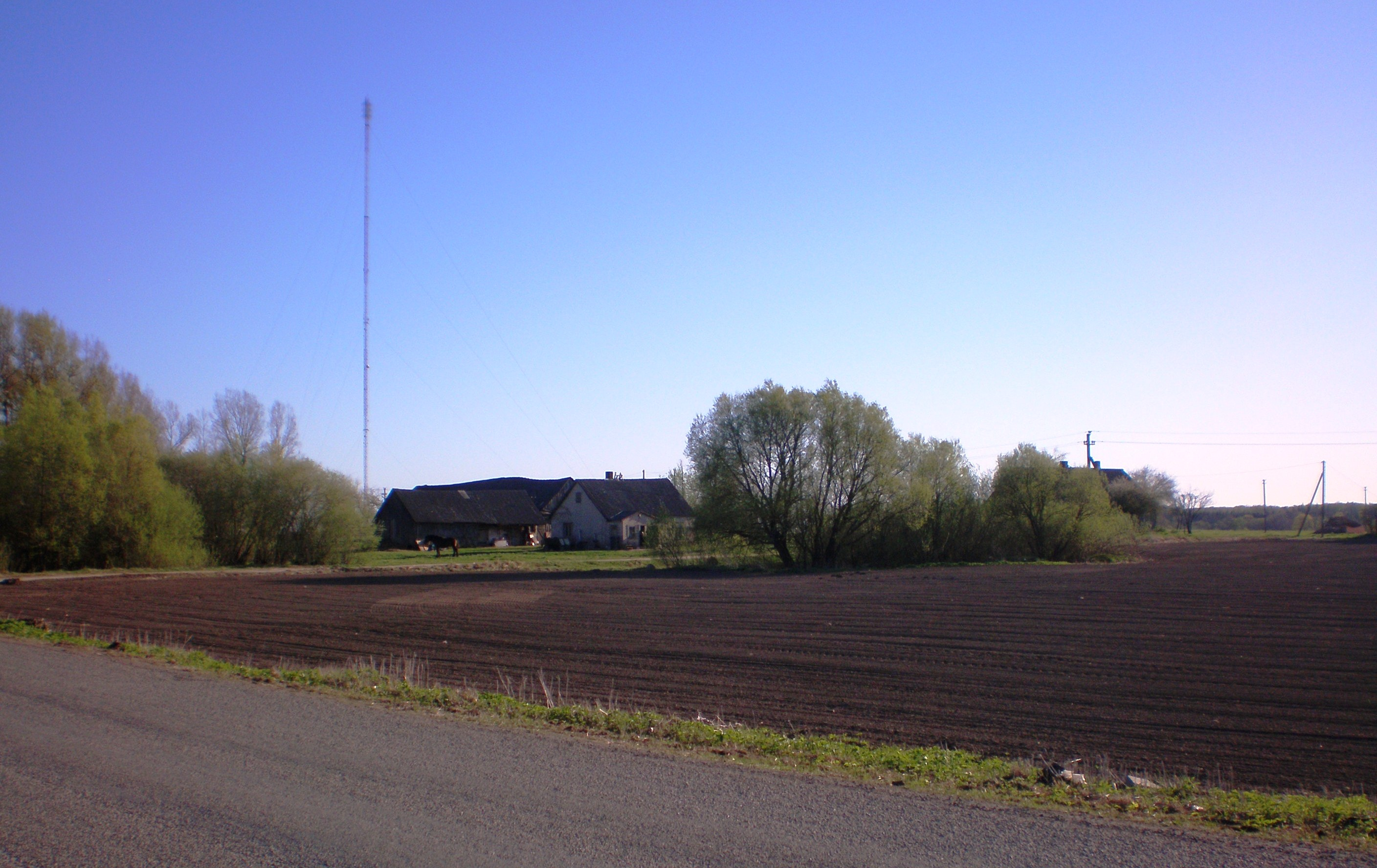

- Location in Lithuania Dovydiškiai (Lithuania)
- Coordinates: 55°26′49″N 23°40′01″E
- Country: Lithuania
- County: Kaunas County
- Municipality: Kėdainiai district municipality
- Eldership: Krakės Eldership

Population (2011)
  - Total: 32
- Time zone: UTC+2 (EET)
  - Summer (DST): UTC+3 (EEST)

Dovydiškiai (formerly Polish: Dawidyszki, Russian: Довидышки) is a village in Kėdainiai district municipality, in Kaunas County, in central Lithuania. According to the 2011 census, the village had a population of 32 people. It is located 5.5 kilometres (3.4 mi) from Krakės, 0.5 kilometres (0.31 mi) from Barkūniškis, nearby the Šušvė river.

At the beginning of the 20th century there were Dovydiškiai village and Dovydiškiai estate belonging to the Tyszkiewicz family.

== Demography ==
Historical population

Year	Pop.	±% p.a.
1902	110	—
1923	136	+1.02%
1959	86	−1.27%
1970	71	−1.73%

Year	Pop.	±% p.a.
1979	52	−3.40%
1989	51	−0.19%
2001	33	−3.56%
2011	32	−0.31%

Source: 1902, 1923, 1959 & 1970, 1979, 1989, 2001, 2011

== Images ==
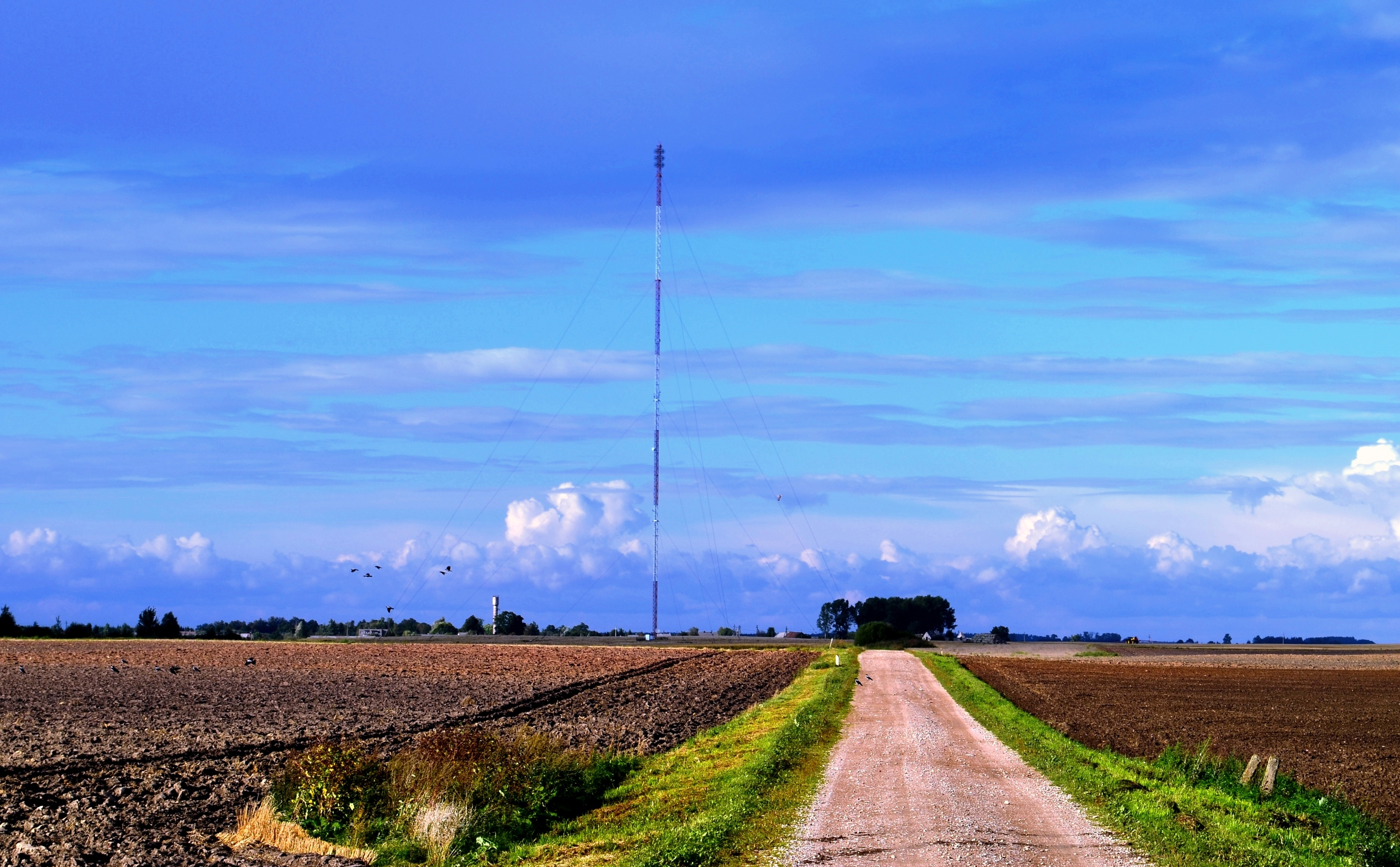
Dovydiškiai telecommunication tower from the Plinkaigalis side
