= Antkalnis =

- Village
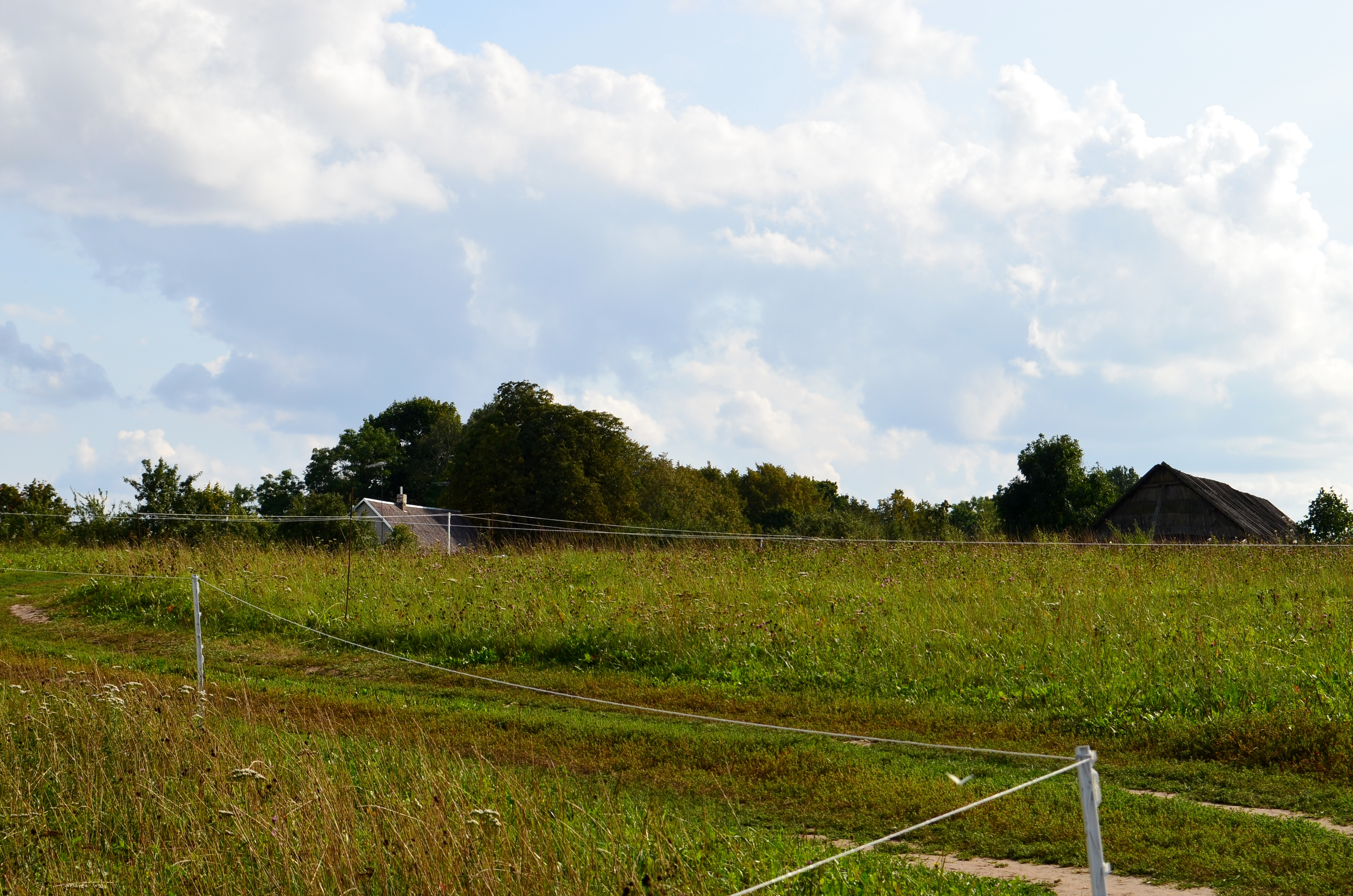

- Location in Lithuania Antkalnis (Lithuania)
- Coordinates: 55°26′55″N 23°39′05″E
- Country: Lithuania
- County: Kaunas County
- Municipality: Kėdainiai district municipality
- Eldership: Krakės Eldership

Population (2011)
  - Total: 11
- Time zone: UTC+2 (EET)
  - Summer (DST): UTC+3 (EEST)

Antkalnis ('a place on a hill') is a village in Kėdainiai district municipality, in Kaunas County, in central Lithuania. According to the 2011 census, the village had a population of 11 people. It is located 9 kilometres (5.6 mi) from Krakės, 1 kilometre (0.62 mi) from Ažytėnai, at the confluence of the Šušvė and Ažytė rivers, in front of Barkūniškis village.

Formerly it was a folwark.

== Demography ==
Historical population

Year	Pop.	±% p.a.
1923	17	—
1959	40	+2.41%
1970	19	−6.54%
1979	8	−9.16%

Year	Pop.	±% p.a.
1989	4	−6.70%
2001	17	+12.81%
2011	11	−4.26%

Source: 1902, 1923, 1959 & 1970, 1979, 1989, 2001, 2011

== Images ==
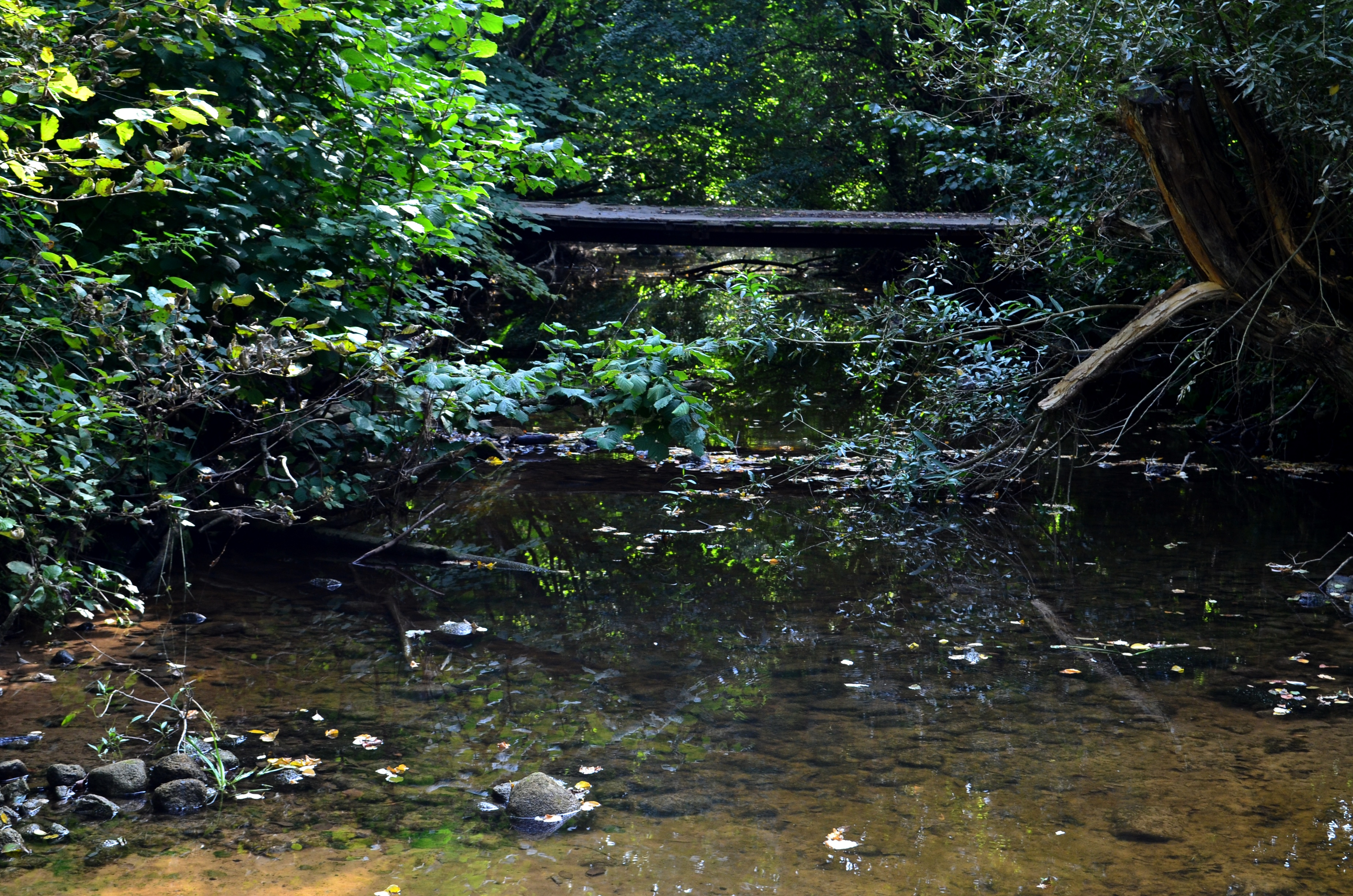
The bridge over the Ažytė in Antkalnis
