= Griniai, Kėdainiai =

Griniai
- Village
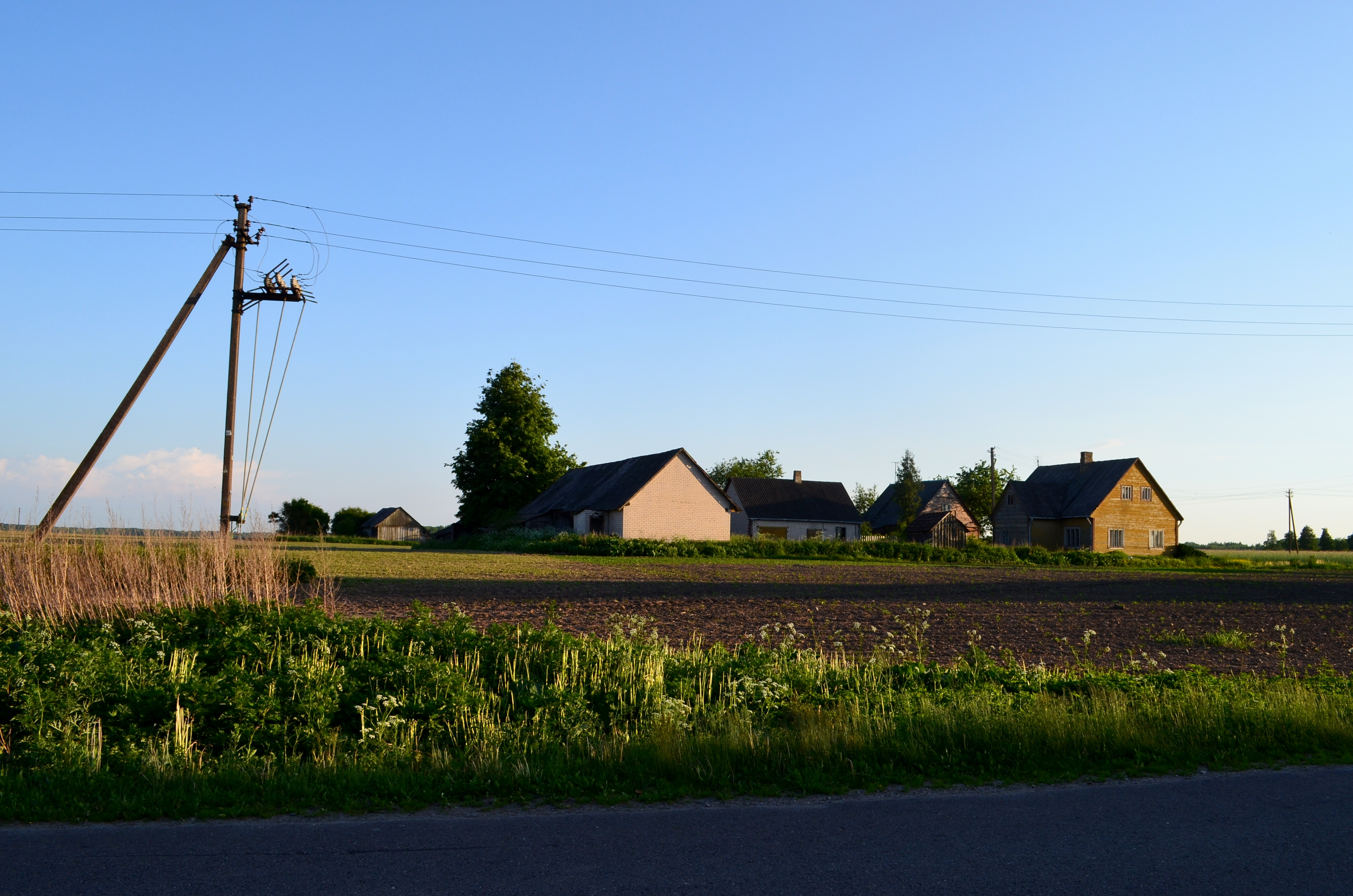

- Location in Lithuania Griniai (Lithuania)
- Coordinates: 55°17′10″N 23°43′01″E
- Country: Lithuania
- County: Kaunas County
- Municipality: Kėdainiai district municipality
- Eldership: Pernarava Eldership

Population (2011)
  - Total: 12
- Time zone: UTC+2 (EET)
  - Summer (DST): UTC+3 (EEST)

Griniai (formerly Russian: Грини, Polish: Grynie) is a village in Kėdainiai district municipality, in Kaunas County, in central Lithuania. According to the 2011 census, the village had a population of 12 people. It is located 2 kilometres (1.2 mi) from Angiriai, on the right bank of the Angiriai Reservoir, by the Žemėplėša rivulet mouth. There is a cemetery with an old oak tree (a nature monument).

== Demography ==
Historical population

Year	Pop.	±% p.a.
1902	103	—
1923	89	−0.69%
1959	142	+1.31%
1970	89	−4.16%

Year	Pop.	±% p.a.
1979	51	−6.00%
1989	23	−7.65%
2001	18	−2.02%
2011	12	−3.97%

Source: 1902, 1923, 1959 & 1970, 1979, 1989, 2001, 2011

== Images ==
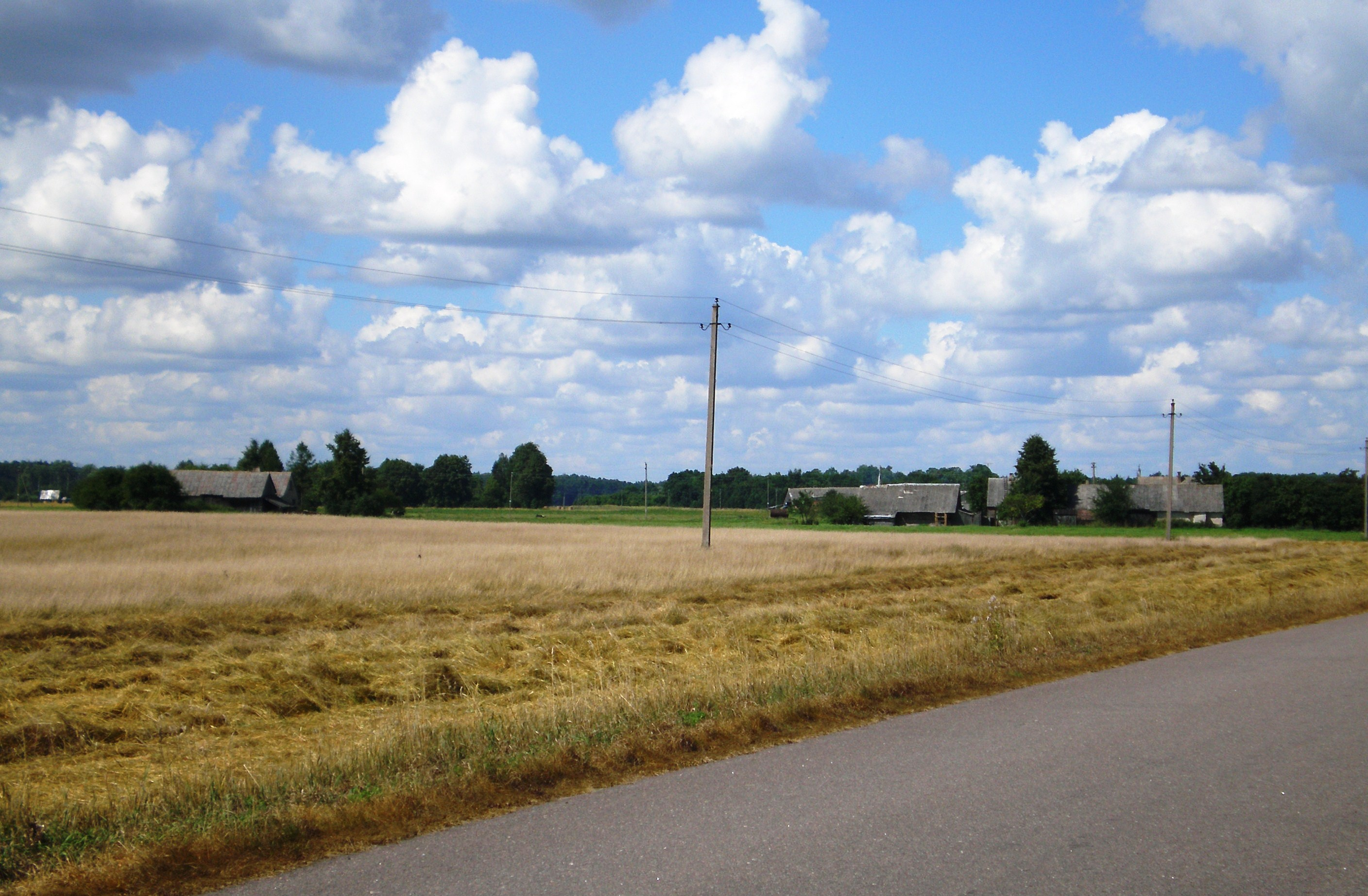
Village landscape

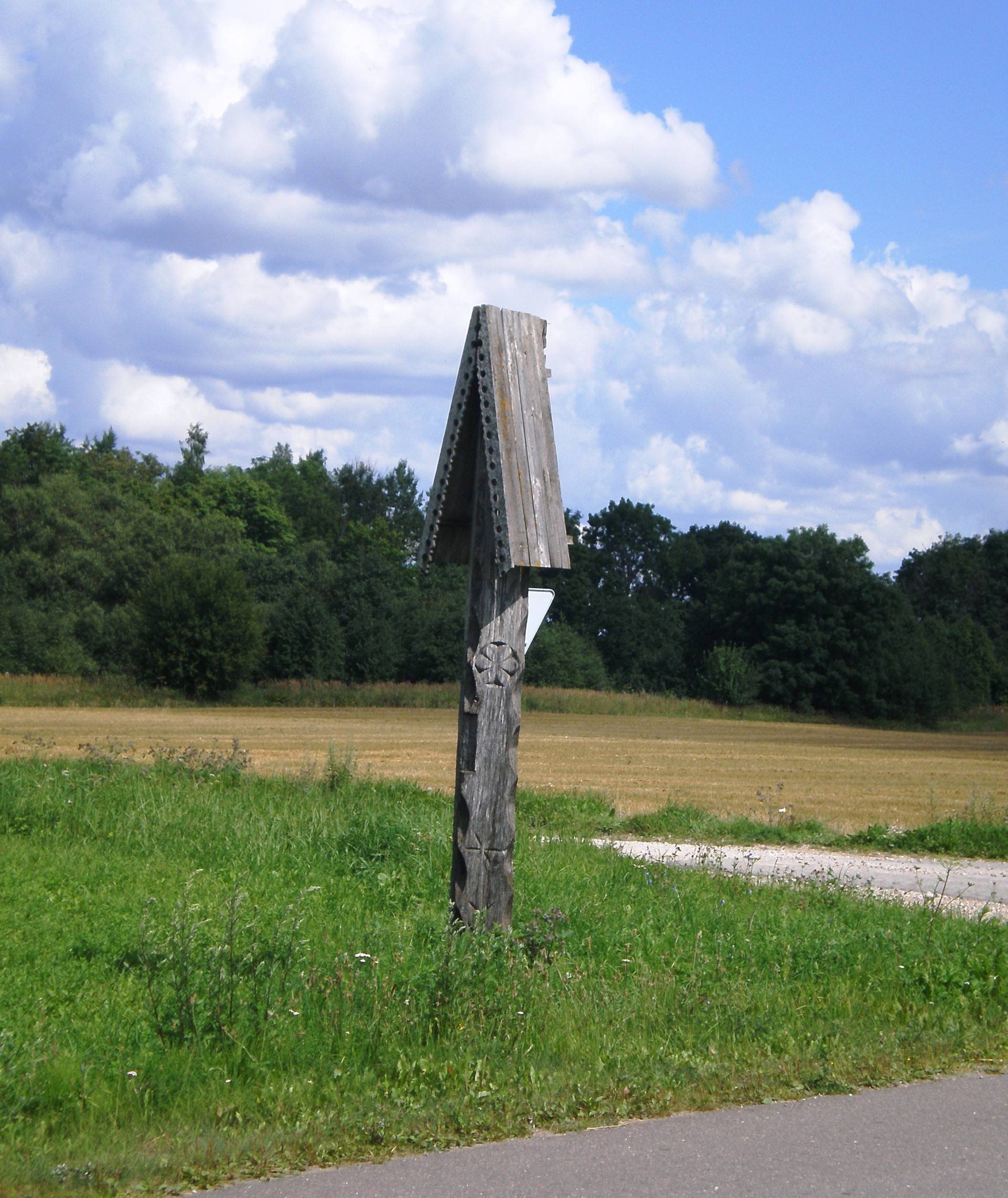
A roofed pole in Griniai, next to a road to Kupsčiai

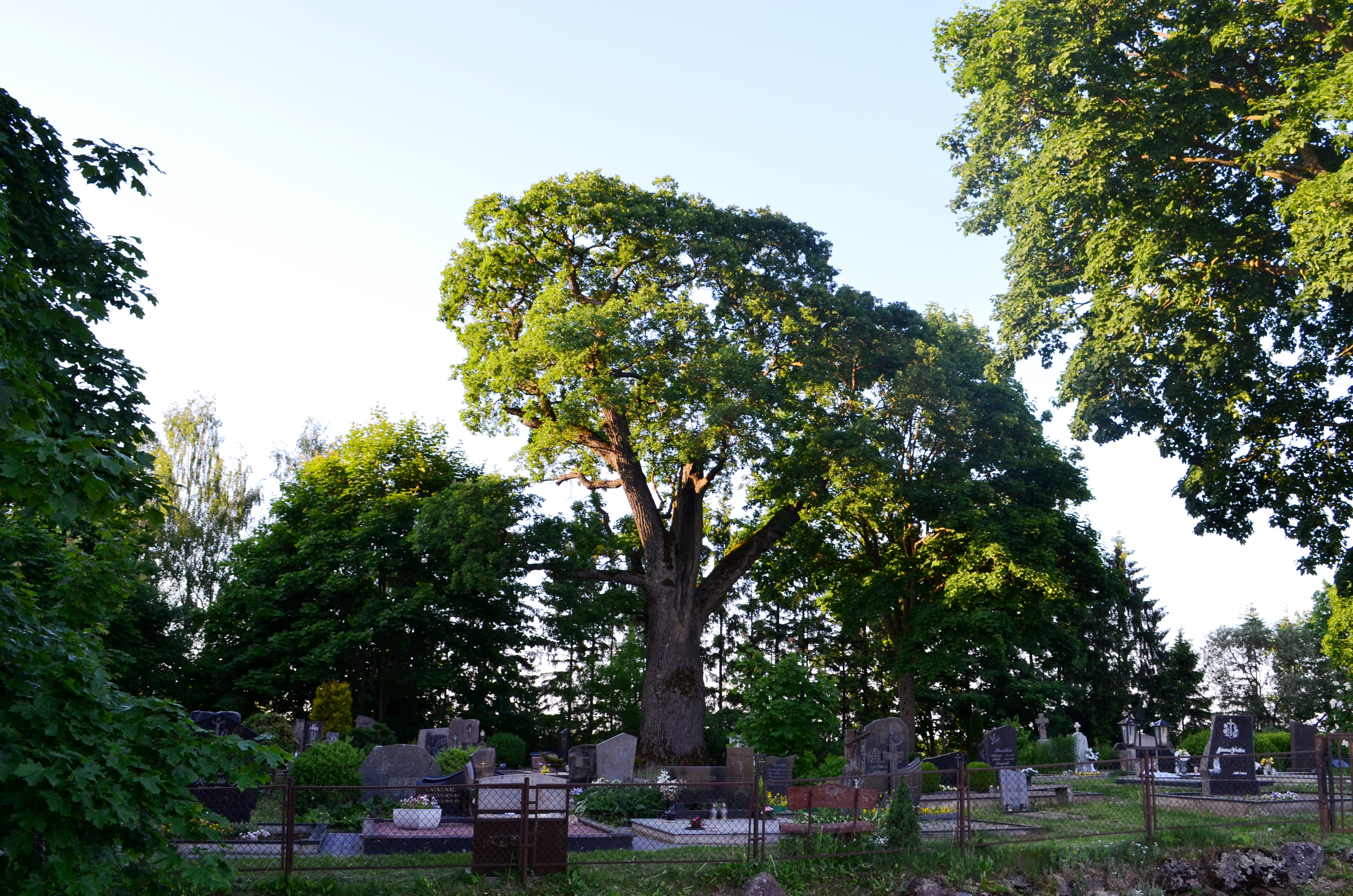
Griniai oak tree in the cemetery
