= Rezgiai =

- Village
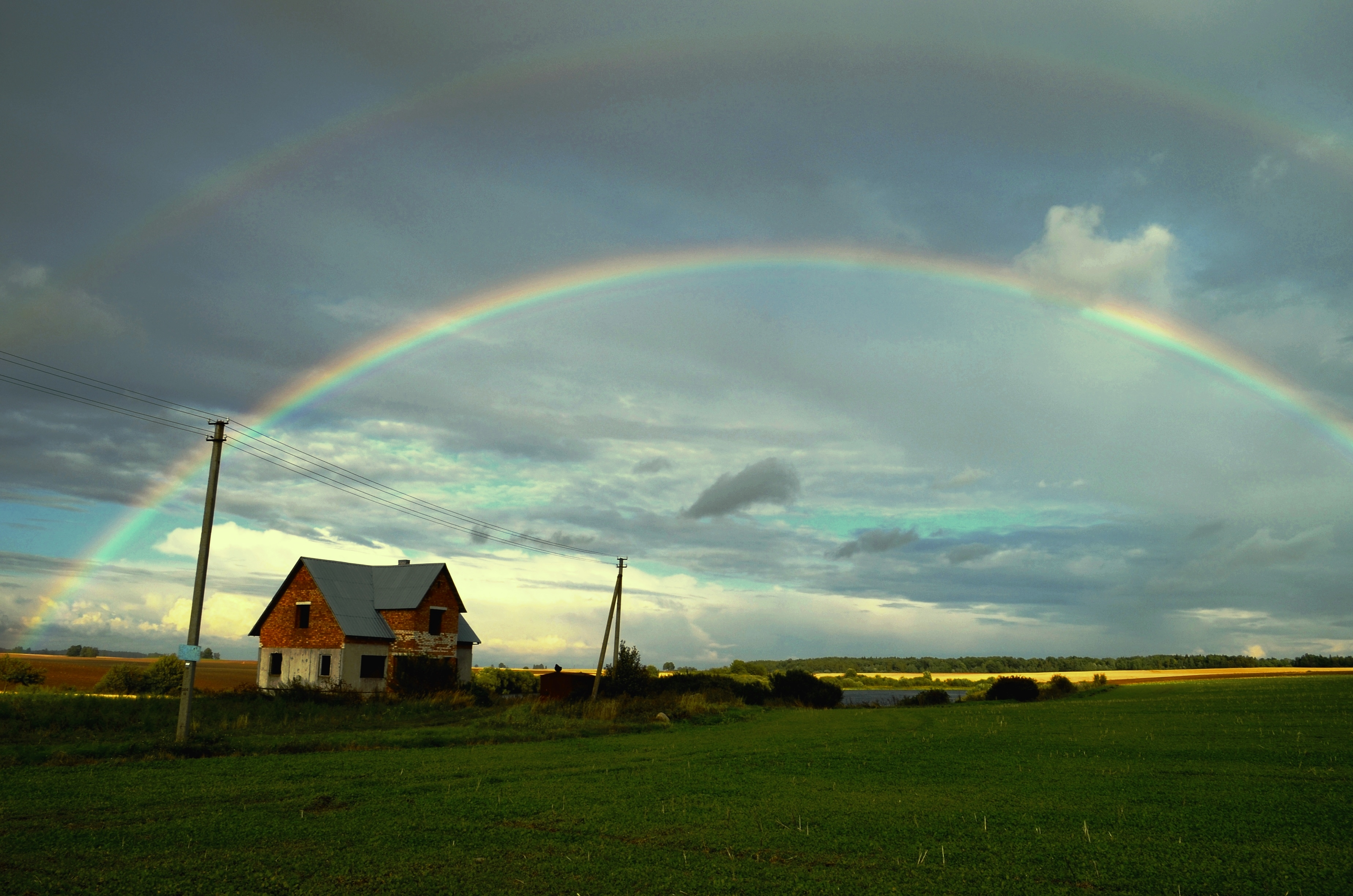

- Location in Lithuania Rezgiai (Lithuania)
- Coordinates: 55°25′45″N 23°39′25″E
- Country: Lithuania
- County: Kaunas County
- Municipality: Kėdainiai district municipality
- Eldership: Krakės Eldership

Population (2011)
  - Total: 0
- Time zone: UTC+2 (EET)
  - Summer (DST): UTC+3 (EEST)

Rezgiai (formerly Russian: Резги, Polish: Rezgi, Rezgie) is a village in Kėdainiai district municipality, in Kaunas County, in central Lithuania. According to the 2011 census, the village was uninhabited. It is located 5 kilometres (3.1 mi) from Krakės, 1 kilometre (0.62 mi) from Plinkaigalis, by the Šušvė river and its tributary the Pušynėlis rivulet (with a pond on it). There is a cemetery with a monument to the January Uprising resurgents. Also a lime tree alley of the former manor is still here.

== History ==
At the end of the 19th century there were three Rezgiai estates by the Šušvė. There was a wooden chapel of St. Eustatius (built in 1759), distillery and water mill. Later there were two estates, one of them belonged to the Jelenskiai, another to the Višnevskiai.

== Demography ==
Historical population

Year	Pop.	±% p.a.
1902	80	—
1923	17	−7.11%
1959	15	−0.35%
1970	3	−13.61%

Year	Pop.	±% p.a.
1979	0	−100.00%
1989	0	0.00%
2001	0	0.00%
2011	0	0.00%

Source: 1902, 1923, 1959 & 1970, 1979, 1989, 2001, 2011
