= Baublys =

Lake in Lithuania

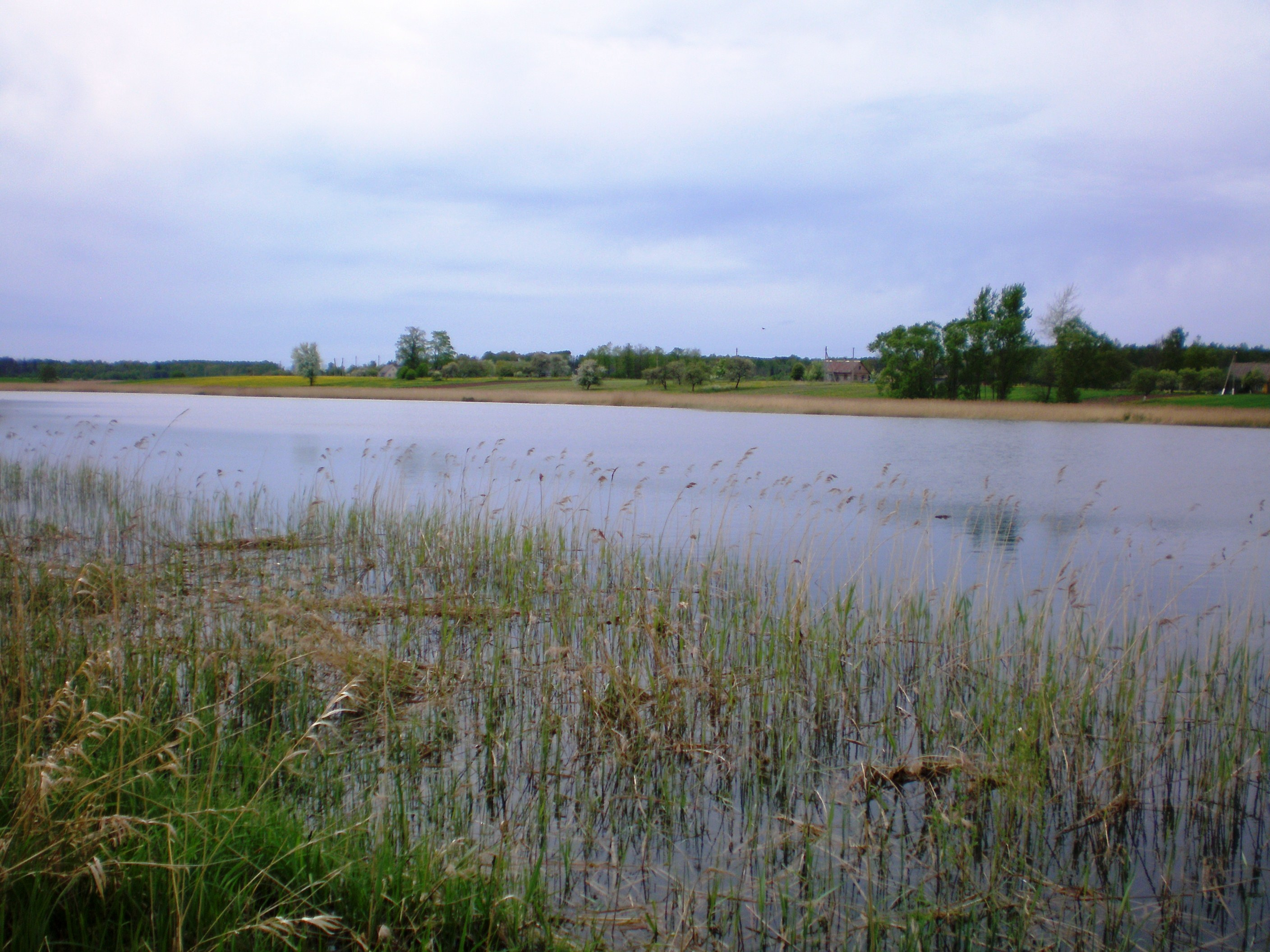
- Baublys Lake from the southern coast

- Location within Lithuania Location within Kėdainiai District Municipality
- Location: Kėdainiai District Municipality, Lithuania
- Coordinates: 55°24′26″N 23°36′56″E
- Etymology: 'bittern'
- Part of: Šušvė→ Nevėžis→ Neman→ Baltic Sea
- Primary inflows: Raguva
- Primary outflows: Raguva
- Max. length: 0.71 km (0.44 mi)
- Max. width: 0.18 km (0.11 mi)
- Surface area: 0.066 km^{2} (0.025 sq mi)
- Shore length^{1}: 1.6 km (0.99 mi)
- Surface elevation: 89.8 m (295 ft)
- Settlements: Antežeriai
- ^{1} Shore length is not a well-defined measure.

The Baublys (or Antežeriai Lake) is a lake in Krakės Eldership, Kėdainiai District Municipality, central Lithuania. This is the largest lake of Kėdainiai District Municipality. It is located 7 kilometres (4.3 mi) to the west from Krakės town and 1 kilometre (0.62 mi) from Pašušvys village. It belongs to the Šušvė basin (part of the Nevėžis basin).

On the northern coast Antežeriai village is located. The Baublys Lake and its close surroundings (reed beds) are declared an ornithological sanctuary. It covers an area of 15 hectares (37 acres). The nesting places of Eurasian bittern, spotted crake and other water birds are protected here.

The name Baublys comes from the same Lithuanian word which means 'bittern'.
