= Plinkaigalis Lake =

Lake in Lithuania

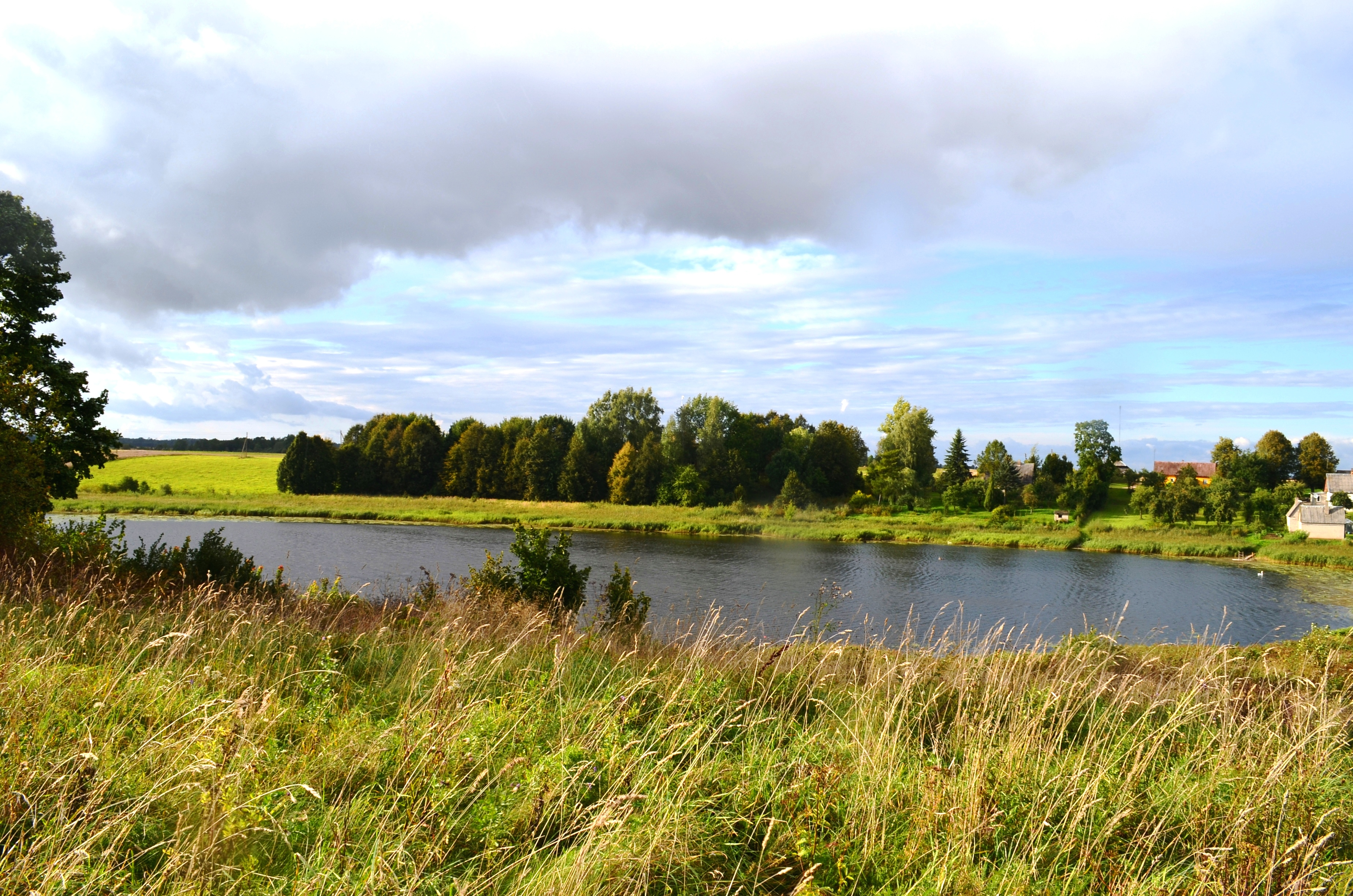
- Plinkaigalis Lake from the southern coast

- Location within Lithuania Location within Kėdainiai District Municipality
- Location: Kėdainiai District Municipality, Lithuania
- Coordinates: 55°24′57″N 23°39′16″E
- Part of: Šušvė→ Nevėžis→ Neman→ Baltic Sea
- Primary inflows: Žiedupė
- River sources: Žiedupė
- Max. length: 0.3 km (0.19 mi)
- Max. width: 0.1 km (0.062 mi)
- Surface area: c. 0.031 km^{2} (0.012 sq mi)
- Shore length^{1}: c. 0.8 km (0.50 mi)
- Surface elevation: 84.8 m (278 ft)
- ^{1} Shore length is not a well-defined measure.

The Plinkaigalis Lake (Lithuanian: Plinkaigalio ežeras, also Minaga) is a lake in Krakės Eldership, Kėdainiai District Municipality, central Lithuania. It is located 5 kilometres (3.1 mi) to the west from Krakės town, at Plinkaigalis village. It belongs to the Šušvė basin (part of the Nevėžis basin).

Coasts of the lake are high, covered by meadows. Nearby the Plinkaigalis Hillfort is located. The lake is inside Pašušvys Landscape Sanctuary.

The name comes from the village name Plinkaigalis. The name Minaga means 'lampern'.
