= Lapskojis =

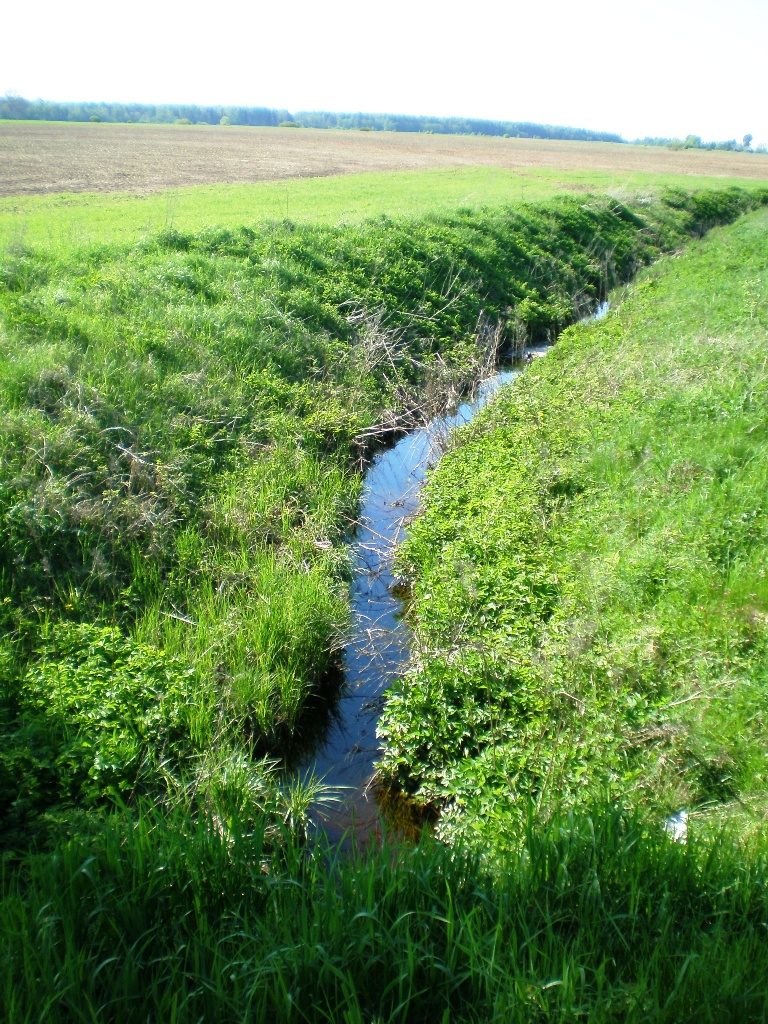
- The middle course of the Lapskojis

Location
- Country: Lithuania
- Region: Kėdainiai district municipality, Kaunas County

Physical characteristics
- Source
  - location: Pernarava-Šaravai Forest
- Mouth: Šušvė south to Josvainiai
  - coordinates: 55°14′5″N 23°50′15″E
- Length: 3.3 km (2.1 mi)
- Discharge
  - average: 3.4 km (2.1 mi)

Basin features
- Progression: Šušvė→ Nevėžis→ Neman→ Baltic Sea

The Lapskojis is a river of Kėdainiai district municipality, Kaunas County, central Lithuania. It flows for 3.3 kilometres (2.1 mi) and has a basin area of 3.4 km^{2} (1.3 sq mi). It is a right tributary of the Šušvė river.

The name Lapskojis comes from Lithuanian lapės koja ('a leg of fox').
