= Lenčiai, Kėdainiai =

Lenčiai
- Village
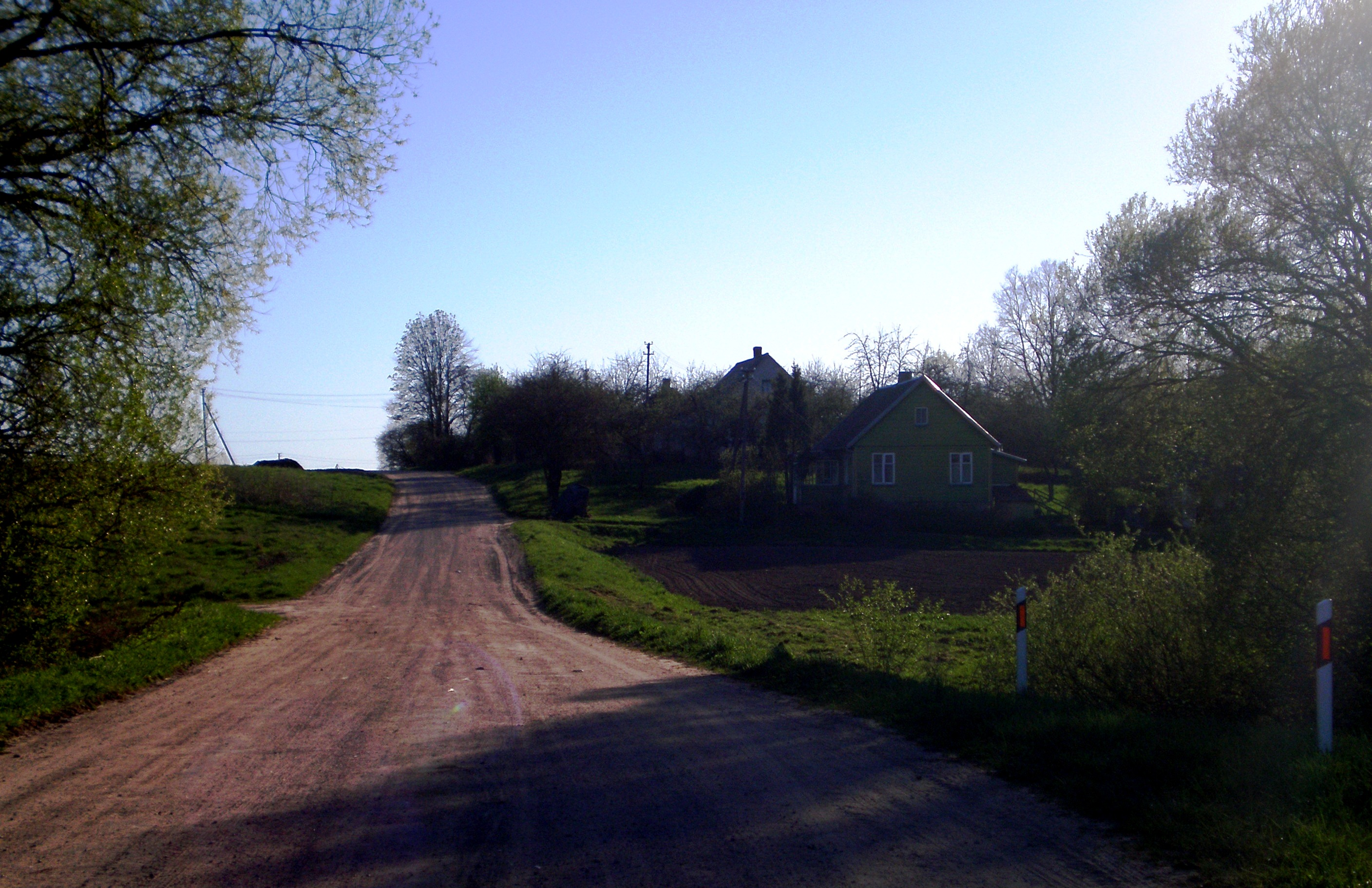

- Location in Lithuania Lenčiai (Lithuania)
- Coordinates: 55°27′11″N 23°36′29″E
- Country: Lithuania
- County: Kaunas County
- Municipality: Kėdainiai district municipality
- Eldership: Krakės Eldership

Population (2011)
  - Total: 18
- Time zone: UTC+2 (EET)
  - Summer (DST): UTC+3 (EEST)

Lenčiai (formerly Russian: Ленчи, Polish: Lencze) is a village in Kėdainiai district municipality, in Kaunas County, in central Lithuania. According to the 2011 census, the village had a population of 18 people. It is located 0.5 kilometres (0.31 mi) from Ažytėnai village, by the Ažytė river.

== History ==
Lenčiai village is known since 1578. A big battle between the January Uprising resurgents and Tsarist army occurred here on 1 April 1863.

== Demography ==
Historical population

Year	Pop.	±% p.a.
1820	106	—
1902	324	+1.37%
1923	214	−1.96%
1959	237	+0.28%
1970	134	−5.05%

Year	Pop.	±% p.a.
1979	52	−9.98%
1985	35	−6.39%
1989	44	+5.89%
2001	35	−1.89%
2011	18	−6.43%

Source: 1902, 1923, 1959 & 1970, 1979, 1989, 2001, 2011

== Notable people ==
- Mykolas Kuprevičius (1864–1932), Lithuanian publicist, entographer born in Lenčiai;
- Mikalojus Katkus (1852–1944), Lithuanian writer, agronomist, buried in the Lenčiai cemetery.
