= Antežeriai, Kėdainiai =

Antežeriai
- Village
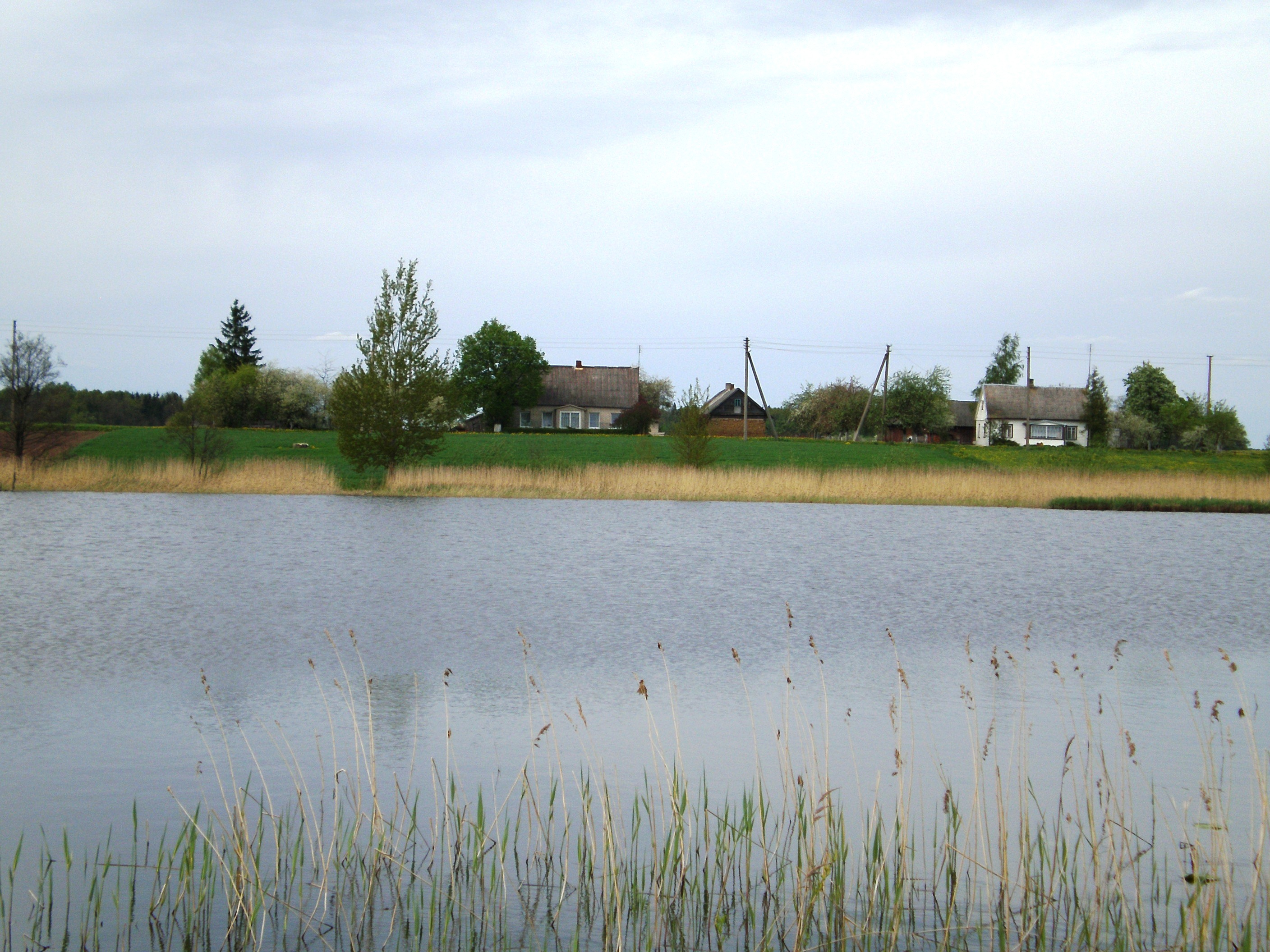

- Location in Lithuania Antežeriai (Lithuania)
- Coordinates: 55°24′29″N 23°36′50″E
- Country: Lithuania
- County: Kaunas County
- Municipality: Kėdainiai district municipality
- Eldership: Krakės Eldership

Population (2011)
  - Total: 41
- Time zone: UTC+2 (EET)
  - Summer (DST): UTC+3 (EEST)

Antežeriai ('a place on a lake', formerly Polish: Antozierki, Russian: Антозерки) is a village in Kėdainiai district municipality, in Kaunas County, in central Lithuania. According to the 2011 census, the village had a population of 41 people. It is located 1 kilometre (0.62 mi) from Pašušvys, on the northern shore of the Baublys lake, close to the Lapkalnys-Paliepiai Forest. The Raguva rivulet passes through the village.

== History ==
At the beginning of the 20th century, there were Ambraziūnai village and estate.

== Demography ==
Historical population

| Year | Pop. | ±% p.a. |
|---|---|---|
| 1902 | 60 | — |
| 1923 | 42 | −1.68% |
| 1959 | 65 | +1.22% |
| 1970 | 52 | −2.01% |

| Year | Pop. | ±% p.a. |
|---|---|---|
| 1979 | 36 | −4.00% |
| 1989 | 32 | −1.17% |
| 2001 | 34 | +0.51% |
| 2011 | 41 | +1.89% |

Source: 1902, 1923, 1959 & 1970, 1979, 1989, 2001, 2011

== Images ==
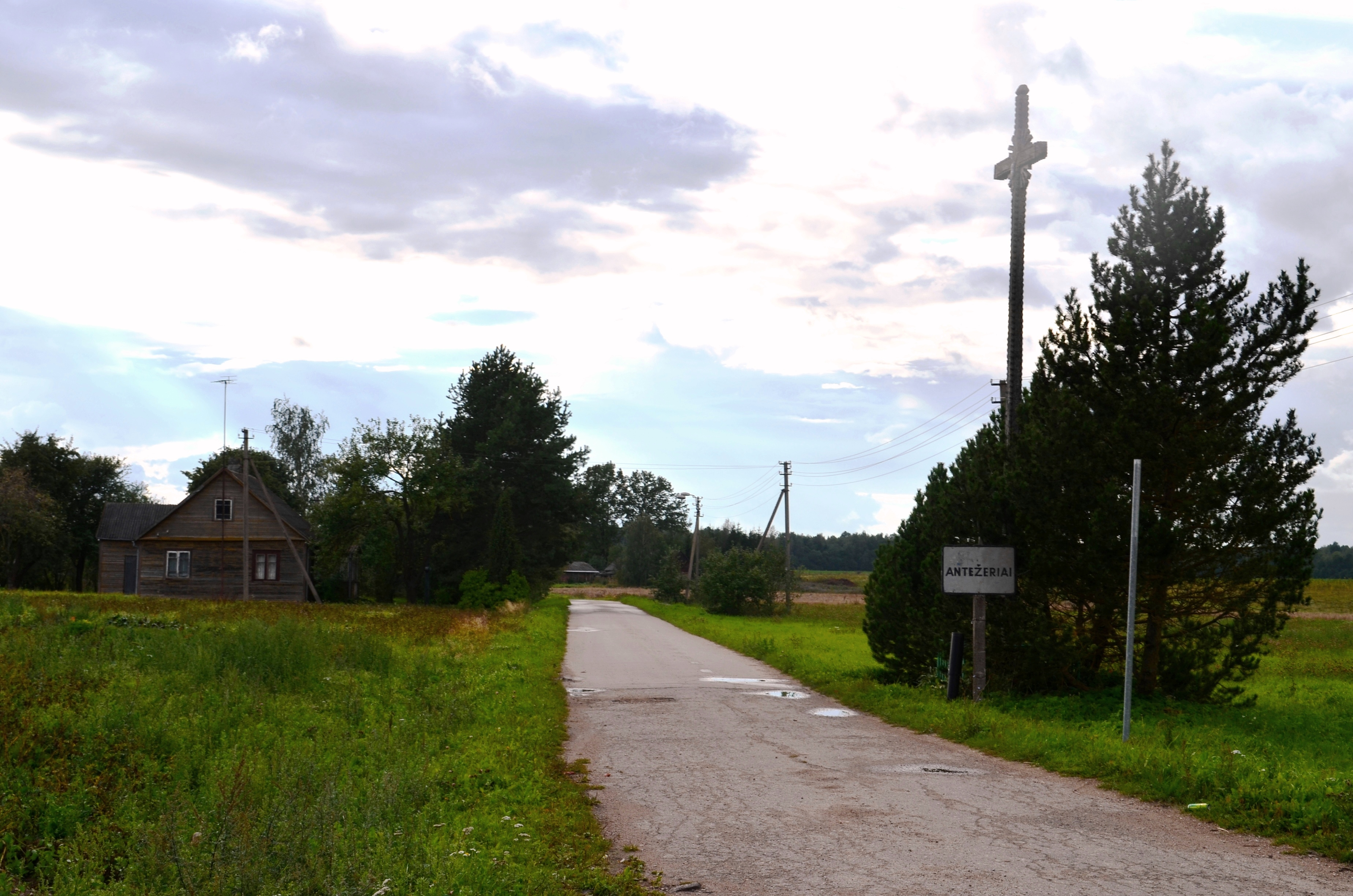
Antežeriai entrance
