= Kupsčiai, Kėdainiai =

Kupsčiai
- Village
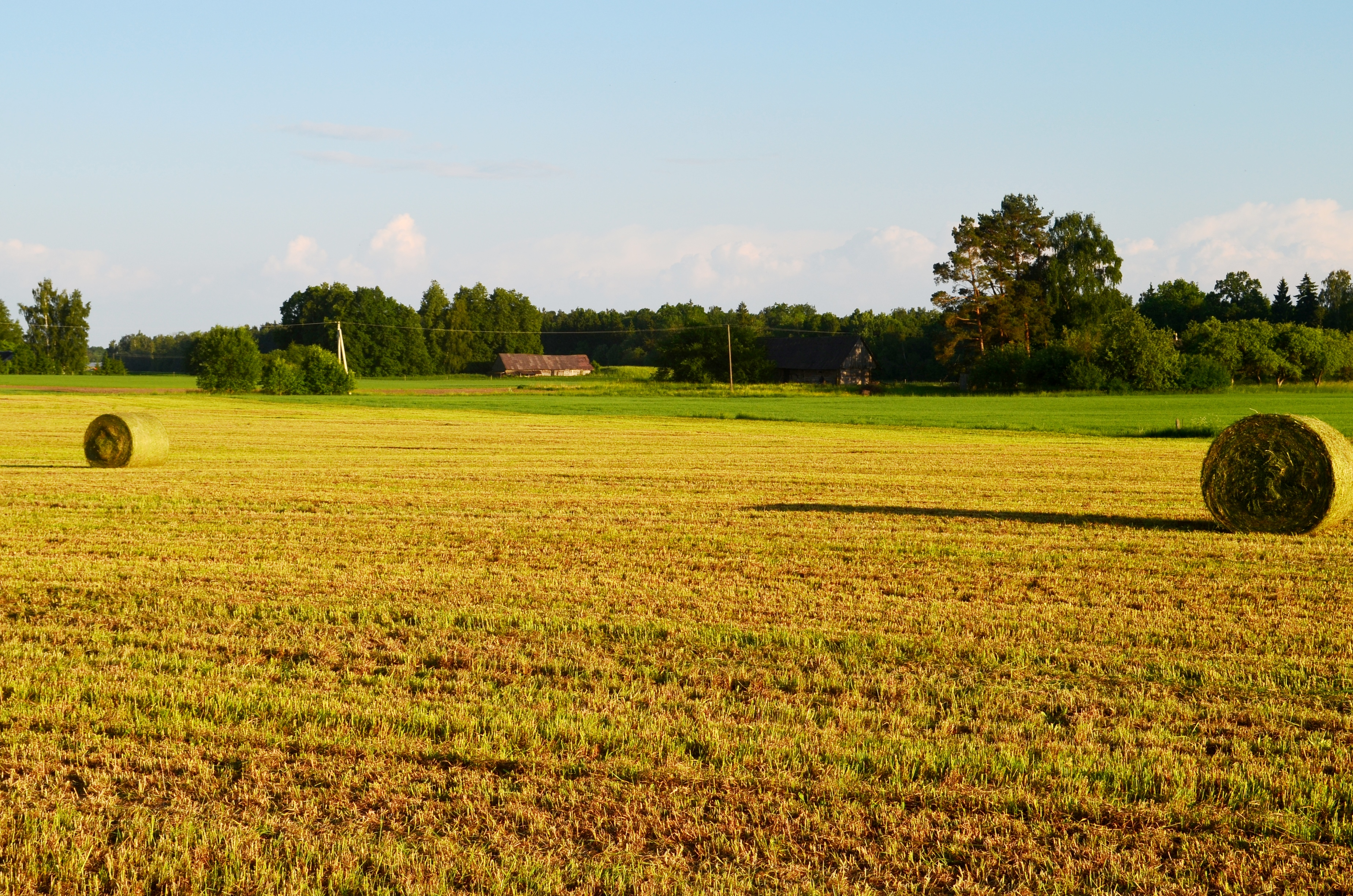

- Location in Lithuania Kupsčiai (Lithuania)
- Coordinates: 55°17′49″N 23°41′10″E
- Country: Lithuania
- County: Kaunas County
- Municipality: Kėdainiai district municipality
- Eldership: Pernarava Eldership

Population (2011)
  - Total: 30
- Time zone: UTC+2 (EET)
  - Summer (DST): UTC+3 (EEST)

Kupsčiai (formerly Russian: Купсце, Купеце, Polish: Kupście) is a village in Kėdainiai district municipality, in Kaunas County, in central Lithuania. According to the 2011 census, the village had a population of 30 people. It is located 4 kilometres (2.5 mi) from Pernarava, among the Angiriai Reservoir, Žemėplėša and Cigoniškė rivulets. The Pavinkšniai Forest is located nearby.

== Demography ==
Historical population

Year	Pop.	±% p.a.
1902	174	—
1923	151	−0.67%
1959	130	−0.42%
1970	111	−1.43%

Year	Pop.	±% p.a.
1979	54	−7.69%
1989	27	−6.70%
2001	26	−0.31%
2011	30	+1.44%

Source: 1902, 1923, 1959 & 1970, 1979, 1989, 2001, 2011
