= Ažytė =

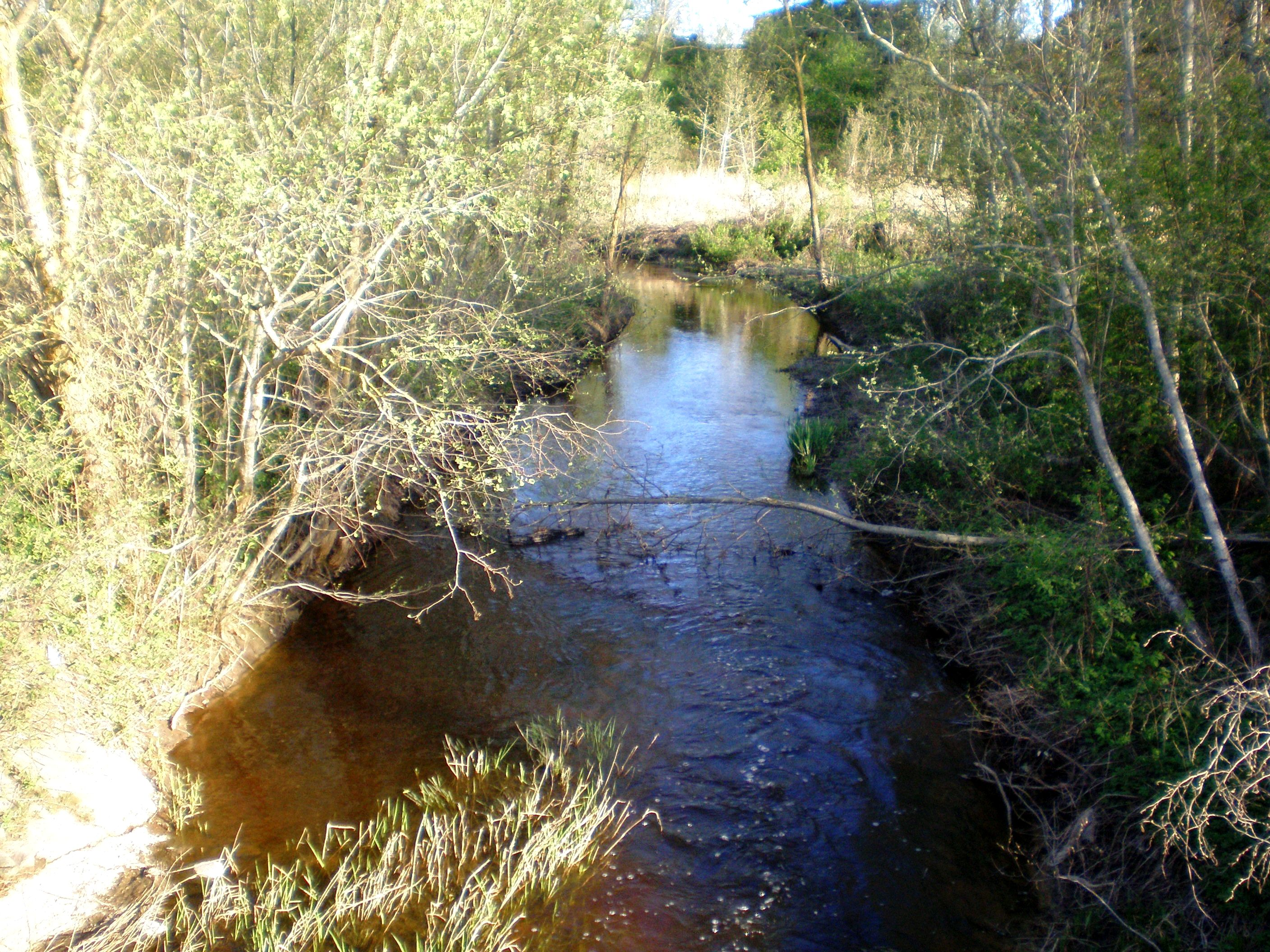
- Ažytė at Ažytėnai

Location
- Country: Lithuania
- Location: Raseiniai district municipality, Kėdainiai district municipality

Physical characteristics
- Mouth: Šušvė
  - coordinates: 55.4498°N 23.6565°E
- Length: 20 km (12 mi)
- Basin size: 98 km^{2} (38 sq mi)
- Discharge
  - average: 0.57 m^{3}/s

Basin features
- Progression: Šušvė→ Nevėžis→ Neman→ Baltic Sea
- Tributaries
  - left: Morkiškis, Ažytėlė, Duburys
  - right: Ažynas, Traidupys

The Ažytė is a river of Raseiniai district municipality and Kėdainiai district municipality, central Lithuania. It is a right-bank tributary of the Šušvė river. It flows for 20 kilometres and has a basin area of 98 km^{2}. It originates near Betygala town and flows mostly eastwards. It meets Šušvė near Antkalnis village.

The river valley is 10–20 meters deep. The river channel is canalized in the upper course. Its width is 6–7 meters while its depth hovers between 0.5–0.6 meters. Rapidness of the flow is 0.1 meters per second.

The Ažytė runs through Barsukinė, Lenčiai, Ažytėnai, Antkalnis villages.

Its name possibly comes from the Lithuanian word ežia ('a boundary').

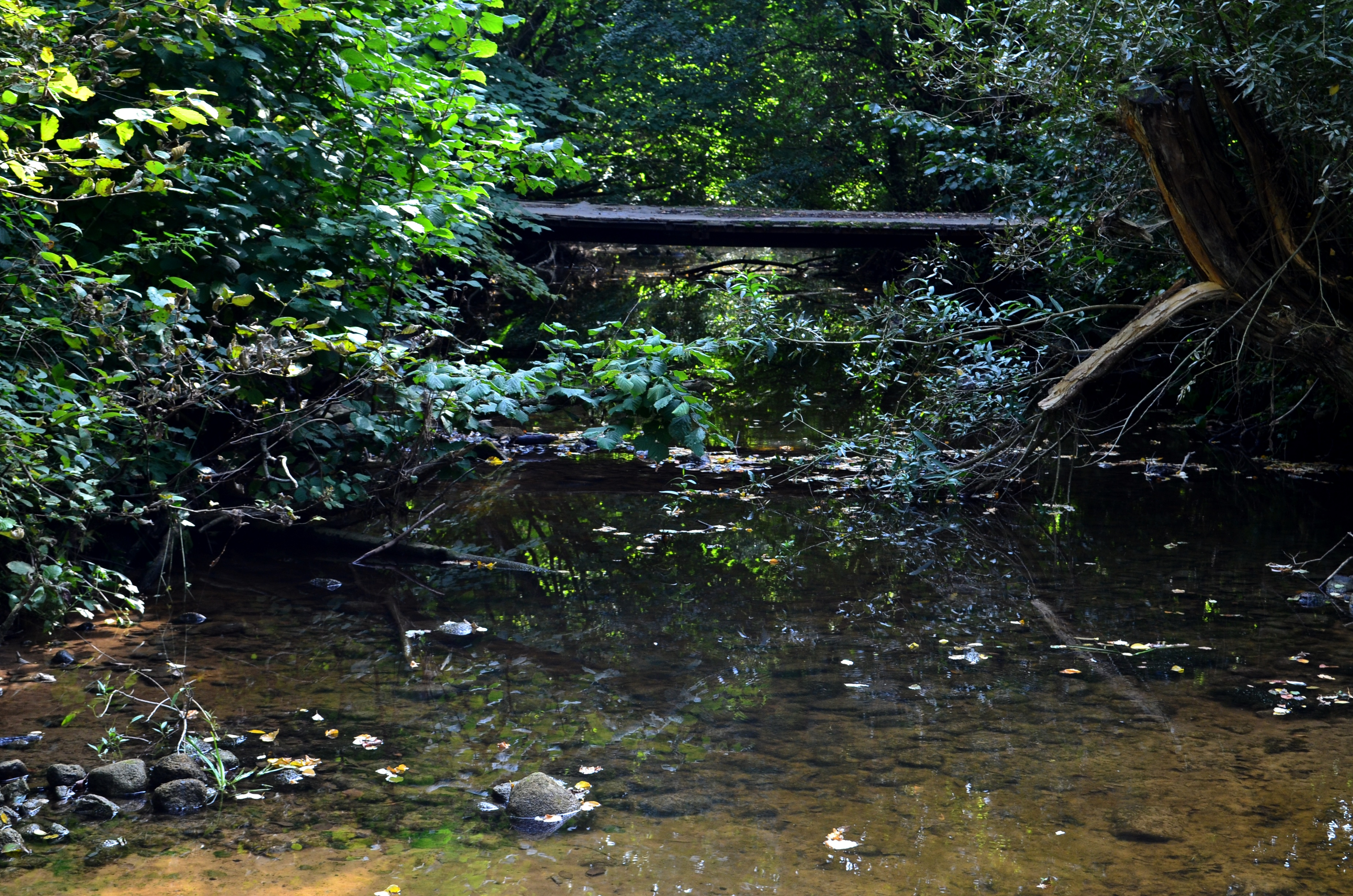
Ažytė next to Antkalnis village
