= Ažytėnai =

- Village
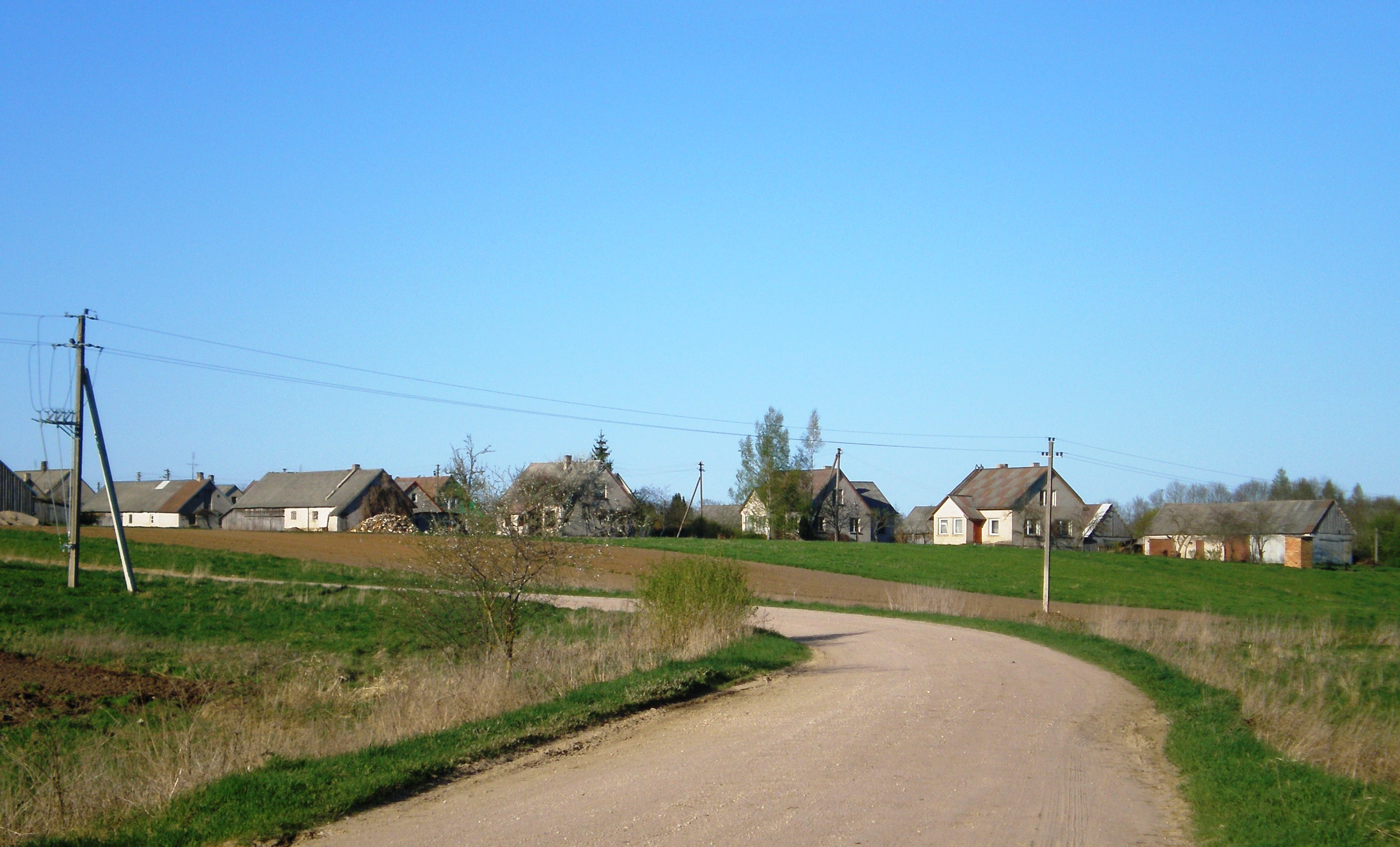

- Location in Lithuania Ažytėnai (Lithuania)
- Coordinates: 55°27′40″N 23°37′19″E
- Country: Lithuania
- County: Kaunas County
- Municipality: Kėdainiai district municipality
- Eldership: Krakės Eldership

Population (2011)
  - Total: 239
- Time zone: UTC+2 (EET)
  - Summer (DST): UTC+3 (EEST)

Ažytėnai (formerly Polish: Ożytany, Russian: Ожетаны, Ожитаны) is a village in Kėdainiai district municipality, in Kaunas County, in central Lithuania. According to the 2011 census, the village had a population of 239 people. It is located 9 kilometres (5.6 mi) from Krakės, by the Ažytė river and its tributary Ažytėlė. There are library, school, medicine station, agriculture cooperative.

Ažytėnai is famous for being a living place of Lithuanian writer, agronomist Mikalojus Katkus (1852–1944). His house now is a memorial museum.

== History ==
On 1 April 1863 a big battle of the January Uprising occurred between Ažytėnai and Lenčiai villages. About 600 insurgents, led by Bolesław Kajetan Kolyszko, Bolesław Roman Dłuski and K. Ciszkewicz had confronted Russian imperial army. In 1910 the first school was opened in Ažytėnai.

During the Soviet era, Ažytėnai was a kolkhoz center and between 1950 and 1963 a selsovet center.

== Demography ==
Historical population

Year	Pop.	±% p.a.
1859	370	—
1902	450	+0.46%
1923	312	−1.73%
1959	265	−0.45%
1970	236	−1.05%

Year	Pop.	±% p.a.
1979	289	+2.28%
1984	253	−2.63%
1989	322	+4.94%
2001	314	−0.21%
2011	239	−2.69%

Source: 1902, 1923, 1959 & 1970, 1979, 1989, 2001, 2011

== Images ==
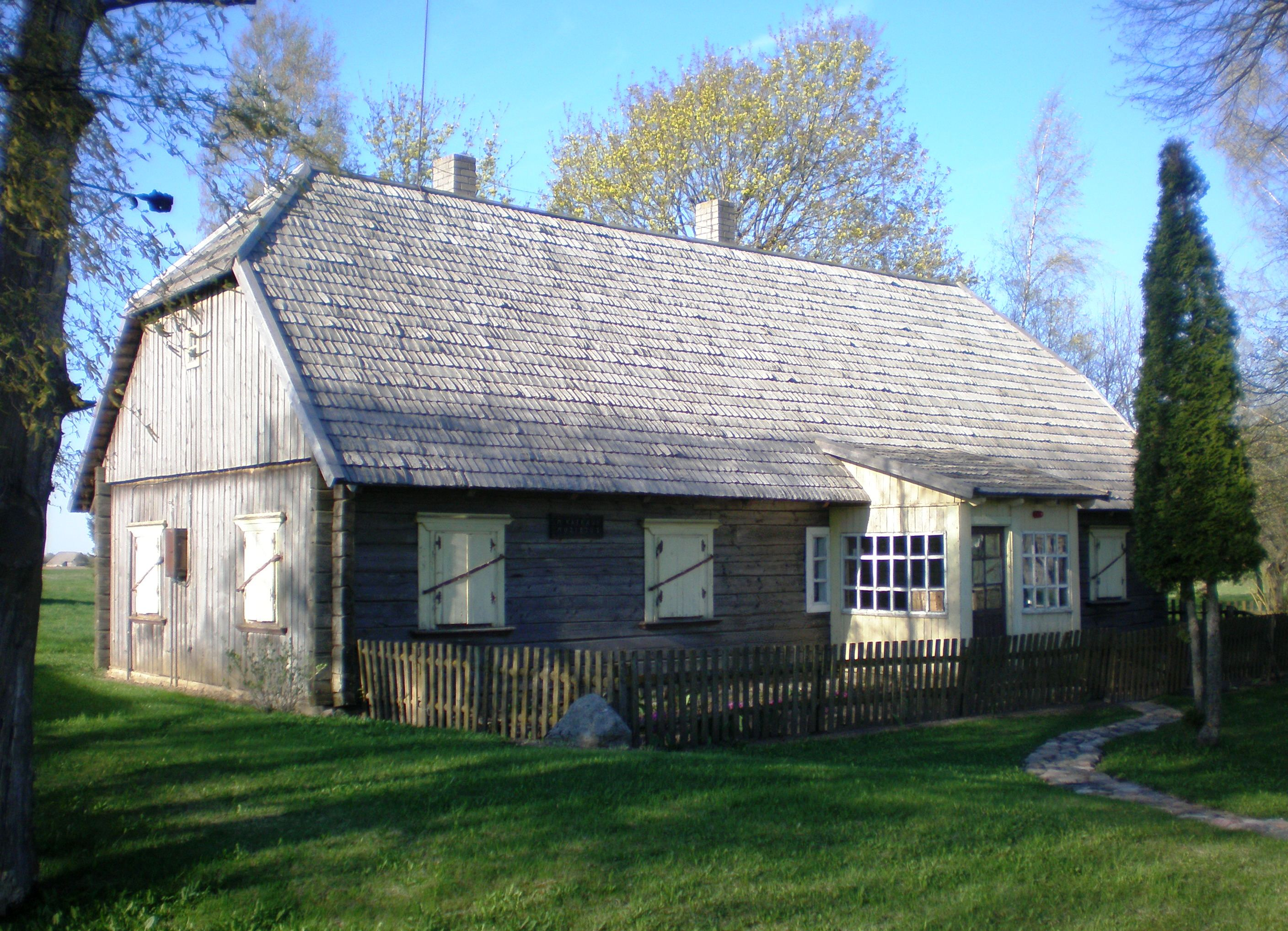
Mikalojus Katkus house

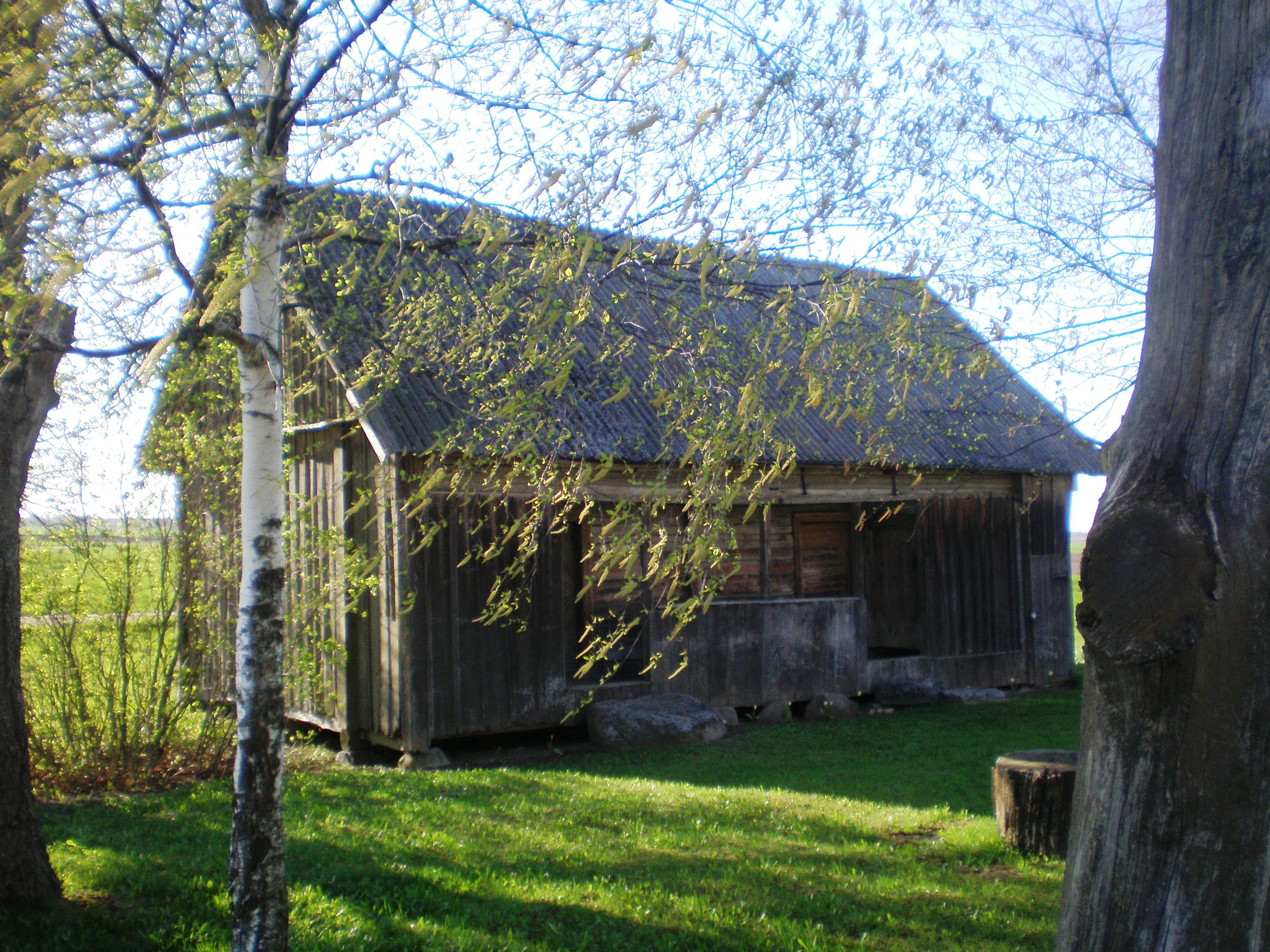
A barn in the Mikalojus Katkus homestead

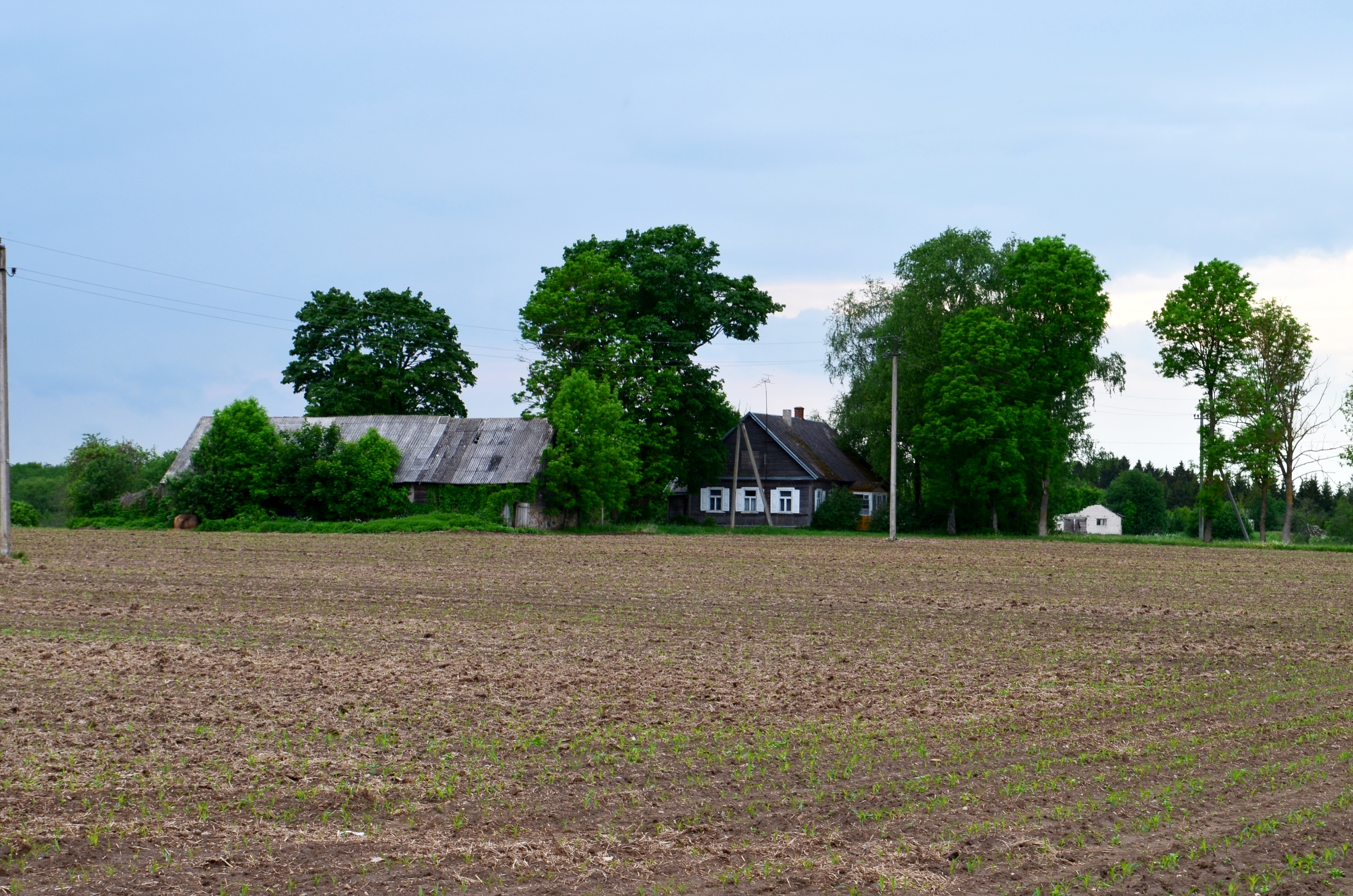
Traditional house in Ažytėnai

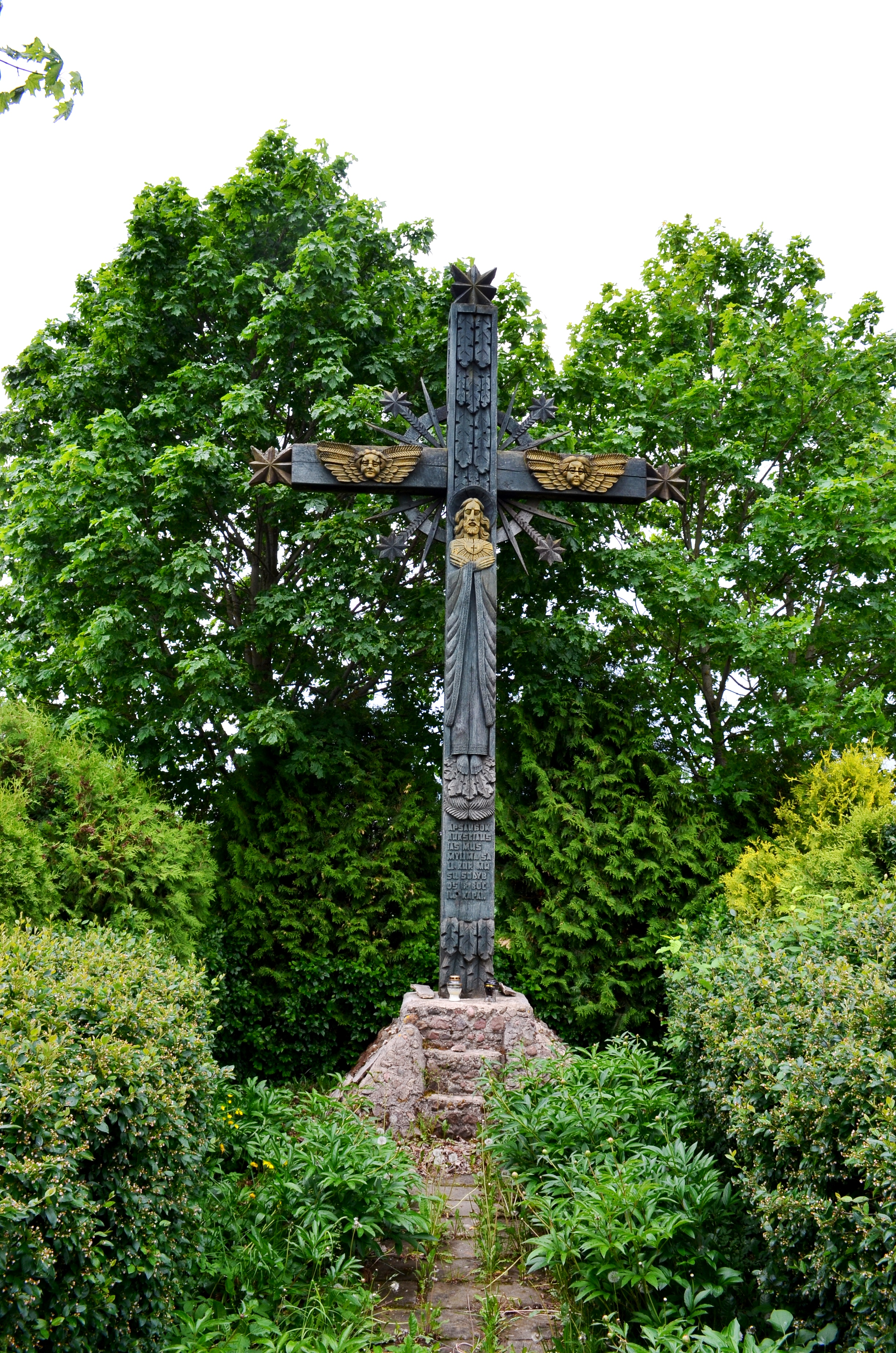
Village cross
