= Plinkaigalis =

- Village
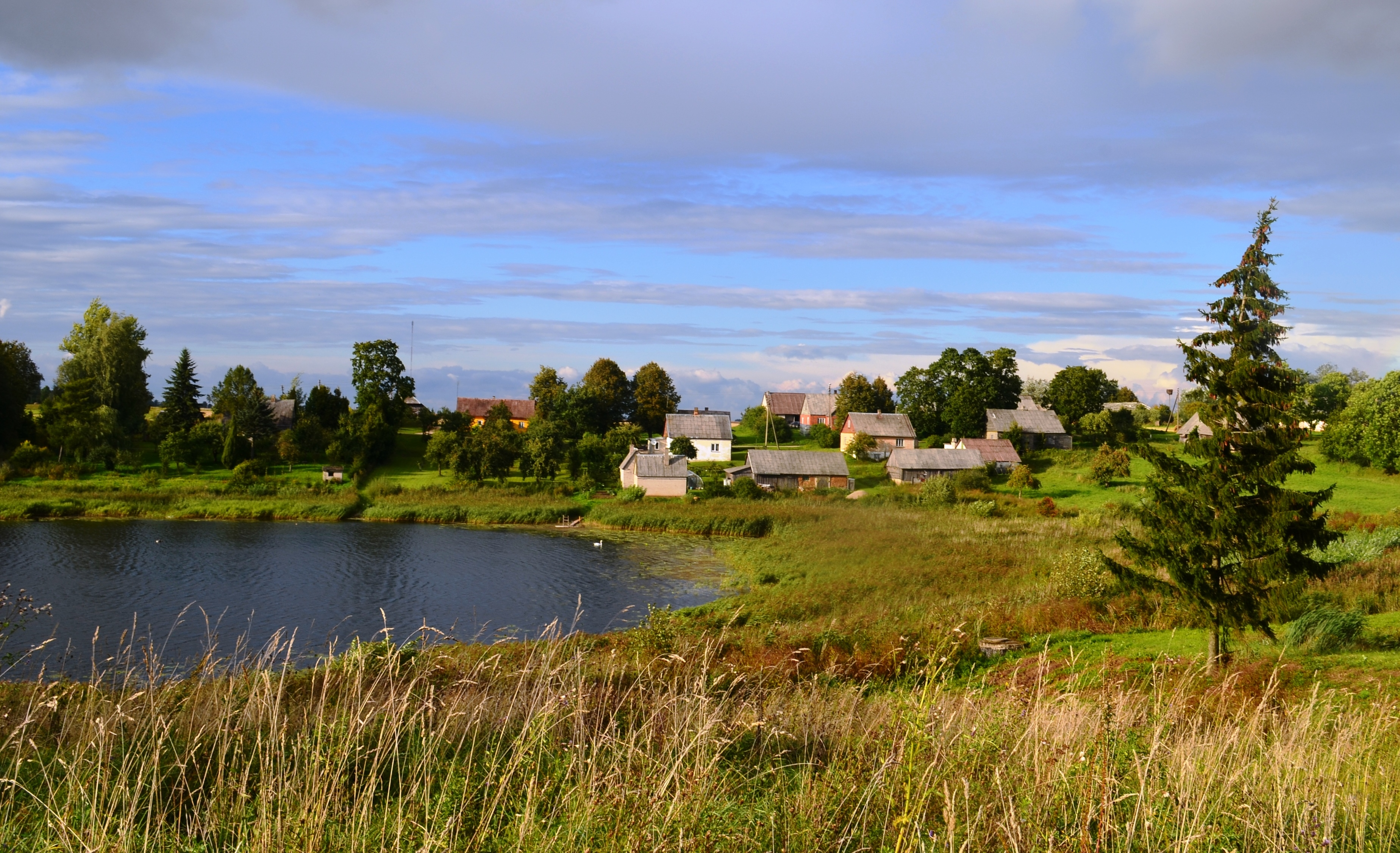

- Location in Lithuania Plinkaigalis (Lithuania)
- Coordinates: 55°24′50″N 23°39′40″E
- Country: Lithuania
- County: Kaunas County
- Municipality: Kėdainiai district municipality
- Eldership: Krakės Eldership

Population (2011)
  - Total: 319
- Time zone: UTC+2 (EET)
  - Summer (DST): UTC+3 (EEST)

Plinkaigalis (formerly Russian: Плинтагола, Polish: Plintagoła) is a village in Kėdainiai district municipality, in Kaunas County, in central Lithuania. According to the 2011 census, the village had a population of 319 people. It is located 5 kilometres (3.1 mi) from Krakės, along the Krakės-Betygala road, on the right bank of the Šušvė river, on the shore of the Plinkaigalis Lake.

There is the Plinkaigalis hillfort on the confluence of the Šušvė and Žiedupė. Also an ancient burial place with rich grave goods had been found nearby.

== History ==
Plinkaigalis village is known since 1595. In 1632 eleven families lived here and six in 1662. During the 18th century the village once had been deserted but later repopulated as the Krakės manor settlement. During the Soviet era it was a kolkhoz center.

== Demography ==
Historical population

Year	Pop.	±% p.a.
1902	63	—
1923	91	+1.77%
1959	70	−0.73%
1970	156	+7.56%
1979	159	+0.21%

Year	Pop.	±% p.a.
1986	216	+4.47%
1989	303	+11.94%
2001	384	+1.99%
2011	319	−1.84%

Source: 1902, 1923, 1959 & 1970, 1979, 1989, 2001, 2011

== Images ==
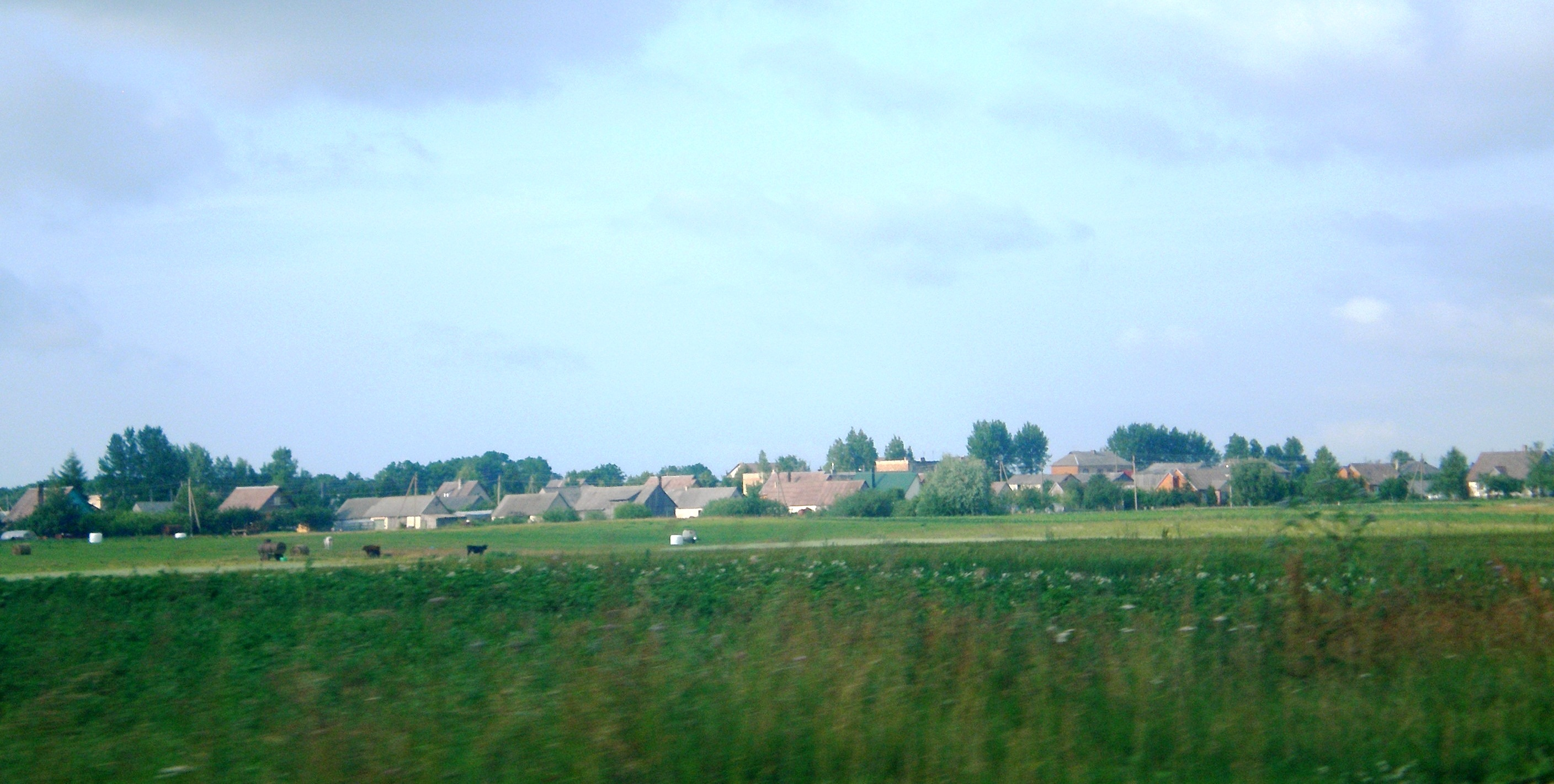
Plinkaigalis from the Krakės-Betygala road

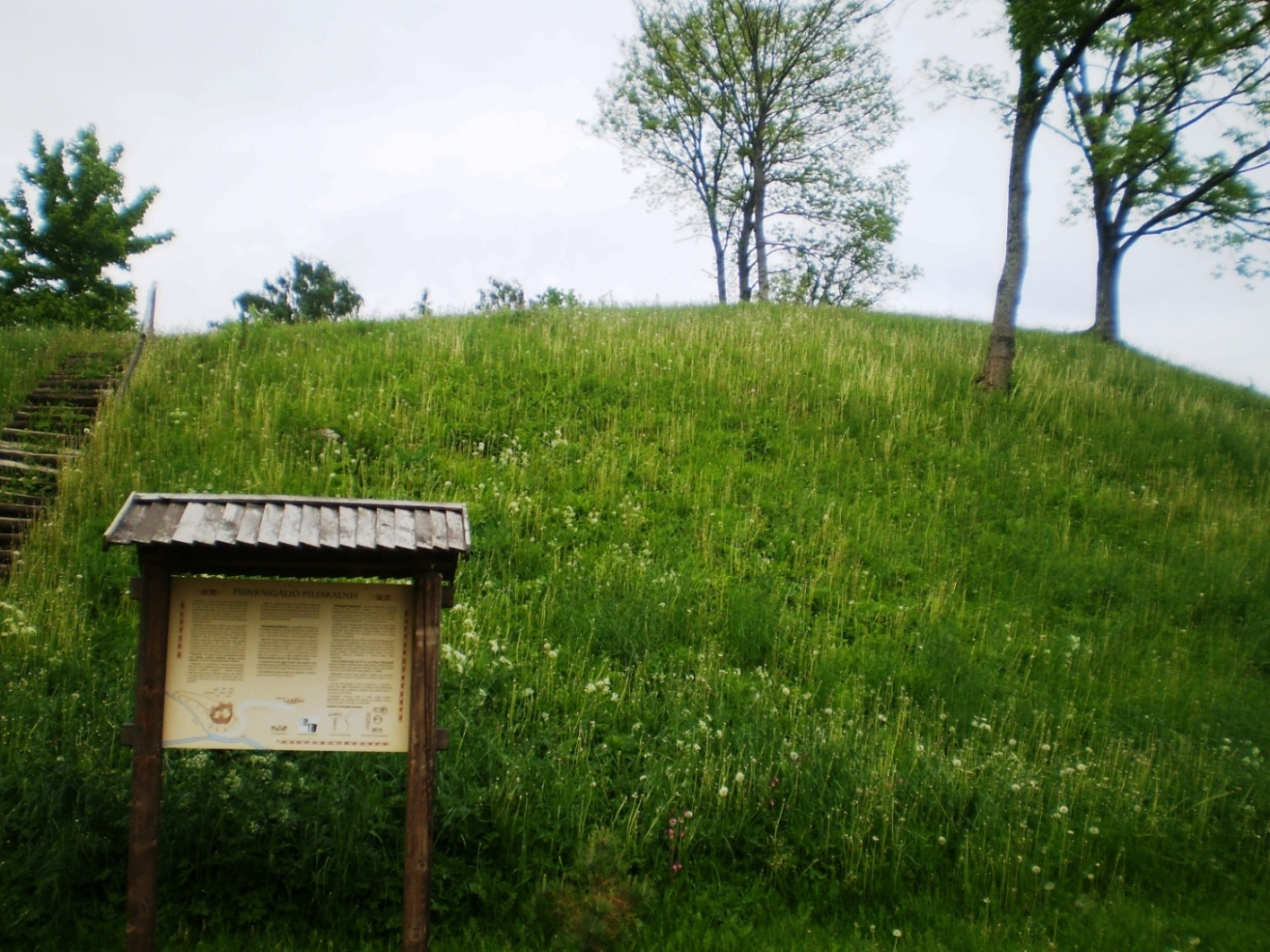
Plinkaigalis hillfort
