= Angiriai Reservoir =

Artificial lake in Kėdainiai District Municipality, Lithuania

- Angirių tvenkinys (Lithuanian)
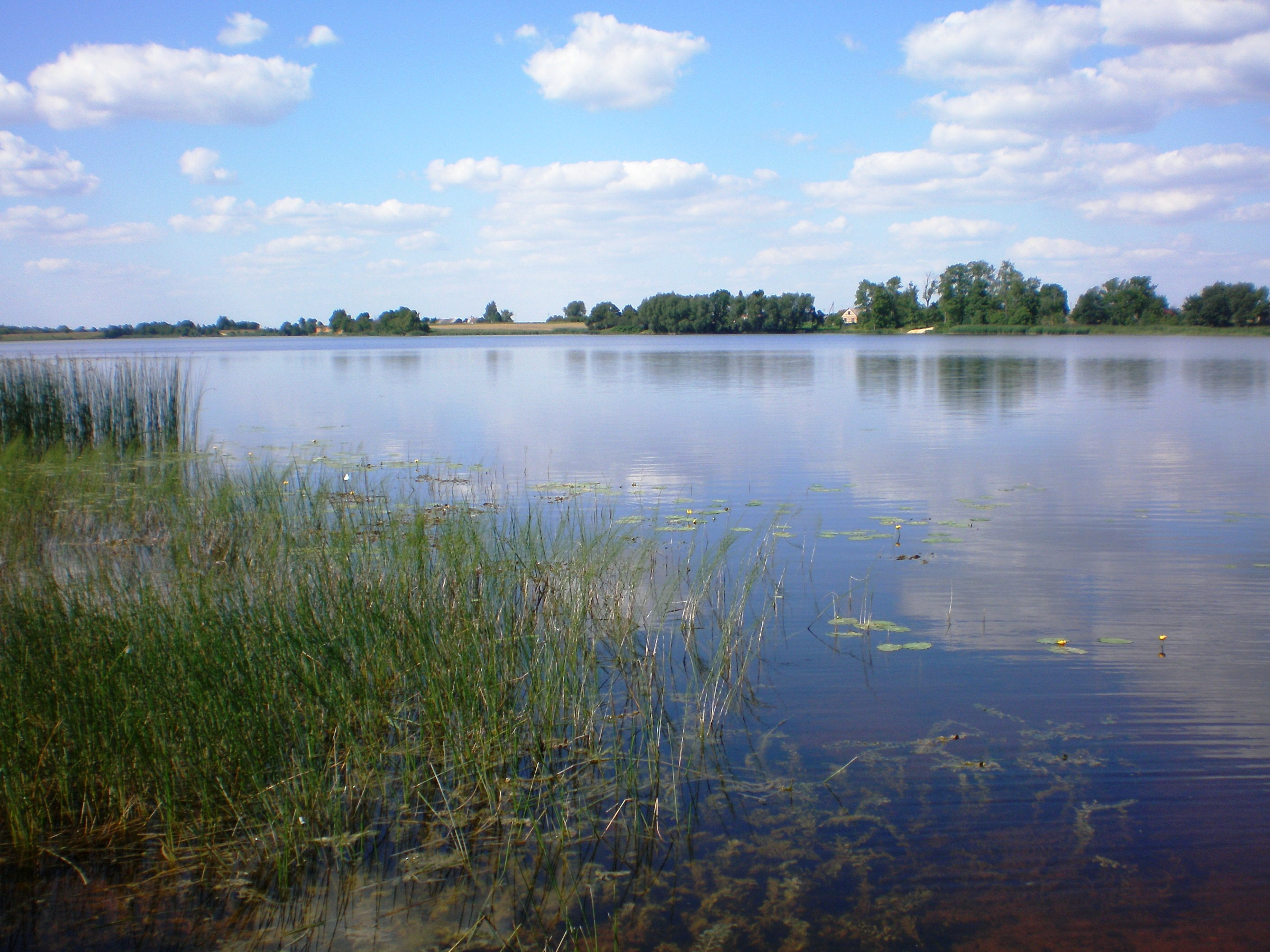
- Angiriai Reservoir next to Angiriai village

- Location within Lithuania Location within Kėdainiai District Municipality
- Location: Kėdainiai District Municipality, Lithuania
- Coordinates: 55°17′49″N 23°42′49″E
- Part of: Šušvė→ Nevėžis→ Neman→ Baltic Sea
- Primary inflows: Šušvė, Paupelys, Žemėplėša, Cigoniškė
- Primary outflows: Šušvė
- First flooded: 1980
- Max. length: 11.6 km (7.2 mi)
- Max. width: 0.6 km (0.37 mi)
- Surface area: 2.483 km^{2} (0.959 sq mi)
- Average depth: 6.2 m (20 ft)
- Max. depth: 11.6 m (38 ft)
- Water volume: 0.0155 km^{3} (0.0037 cu mi)
- Shore length^{1}: 24 km (15 mi)
- Surface elevation: 63 m (207 ft)
- Settlements: Angiriai, Pilsupiai, Griniai, Užvarčiai
- ^{1} Shore length is not a well-defined measure.

The Angiriai Reservoir is an artificial lake in Kėdainiai District Municipality, central Lithuania. It is located 7 kilometres (4.3 mi) north-west from Josvainiai town. It was created in 1980, when a dam on the Šušvė river had been built next to Angiriai village. In 2000, the dam was reconstructed and a small hydroelectric plant built.

Shores of the reservoir at some places are high. The Pilsupiai Outcrop opens to the reservoir in Pilsupiai village. At the higher part of the Angiriai Reservoir the Skinderiškis Dendrological Park is located.

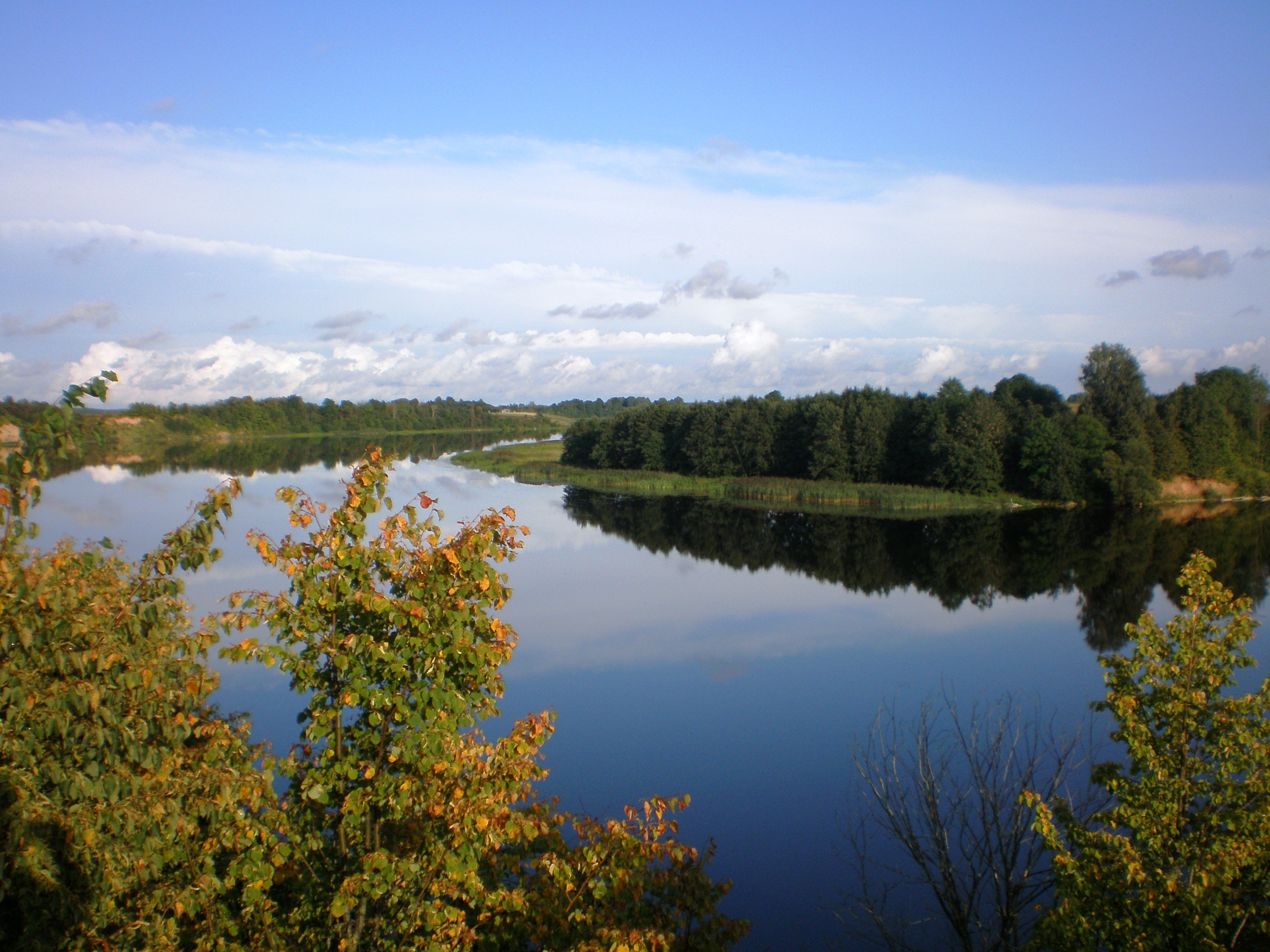
View to the Angiriai Reservoir from the Pilsupiai hillfort
