= Angiriai =

- Village
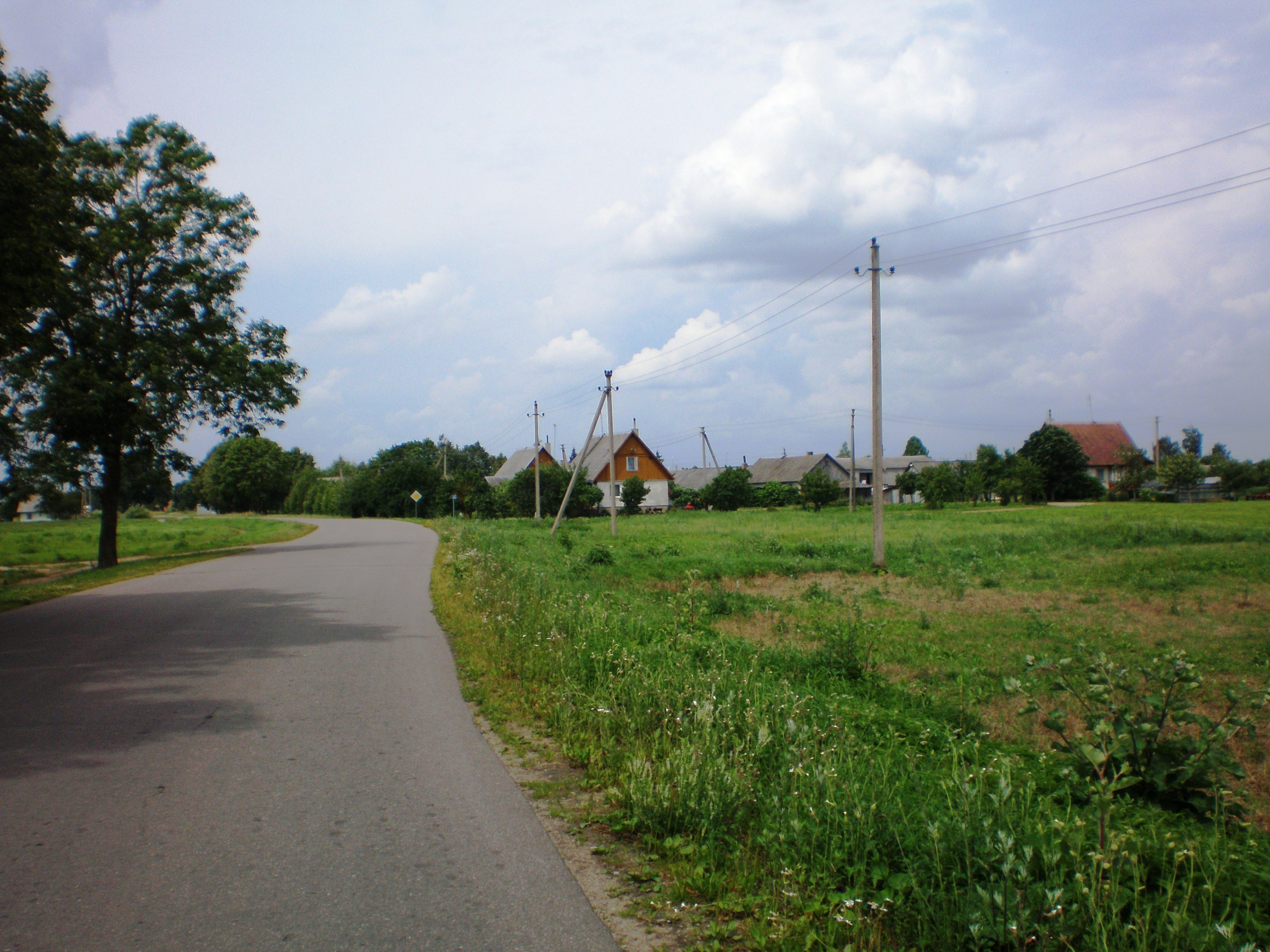

- Location in Lithuania Angiriai (Lithuania)
- Coordinates: 55°16′59″N 23°45′00″E
- Country: Lithuania
- County: Kaunas County
- Municipality: Kėdainiai district municipality
- Eldership: Josvainiai Eldership

Population (2011)
  - Total: 153
- Time zone: UTC+2 (EET)
  - Summer (DST): UTC+3 (EEST)

Angiriai or Angeriai (meaning 'a place on woods', formerly Russian: Онгиры, Polish: Ongiry) is a village in Kėdainiai district municipality, in Kaunas County, in central Lithuania. According to the 2011 census, the village had a population of 153 people. It is located 8 kilometres (5 mi) from Josvainiai, on the left bank of the Šušvė river, by the dam of the Angiriai Reservoir, near the Josvainiai Forest.

== History ==
An ancient stone axe has been found in Angiriai. At the beginning of the 20th century there was Angiriai manor and okolica.

== Demography ==
Historical population

Year	Pop.	±% p.a.
1902	183	—
1923	241	+1.32%
1959	193	−0.62%
1970	196	+0.14%
1979	302	+4.92%

Year	Pop.	±% p.a.
1984	241	−4.41%
1989	197	−3.95%
2001	204	+0.29%
2011	153	−2.84%

Source: 1902, 1923, 1959 & 1970, 1979, 1989, 2001, 2011

== Images ==
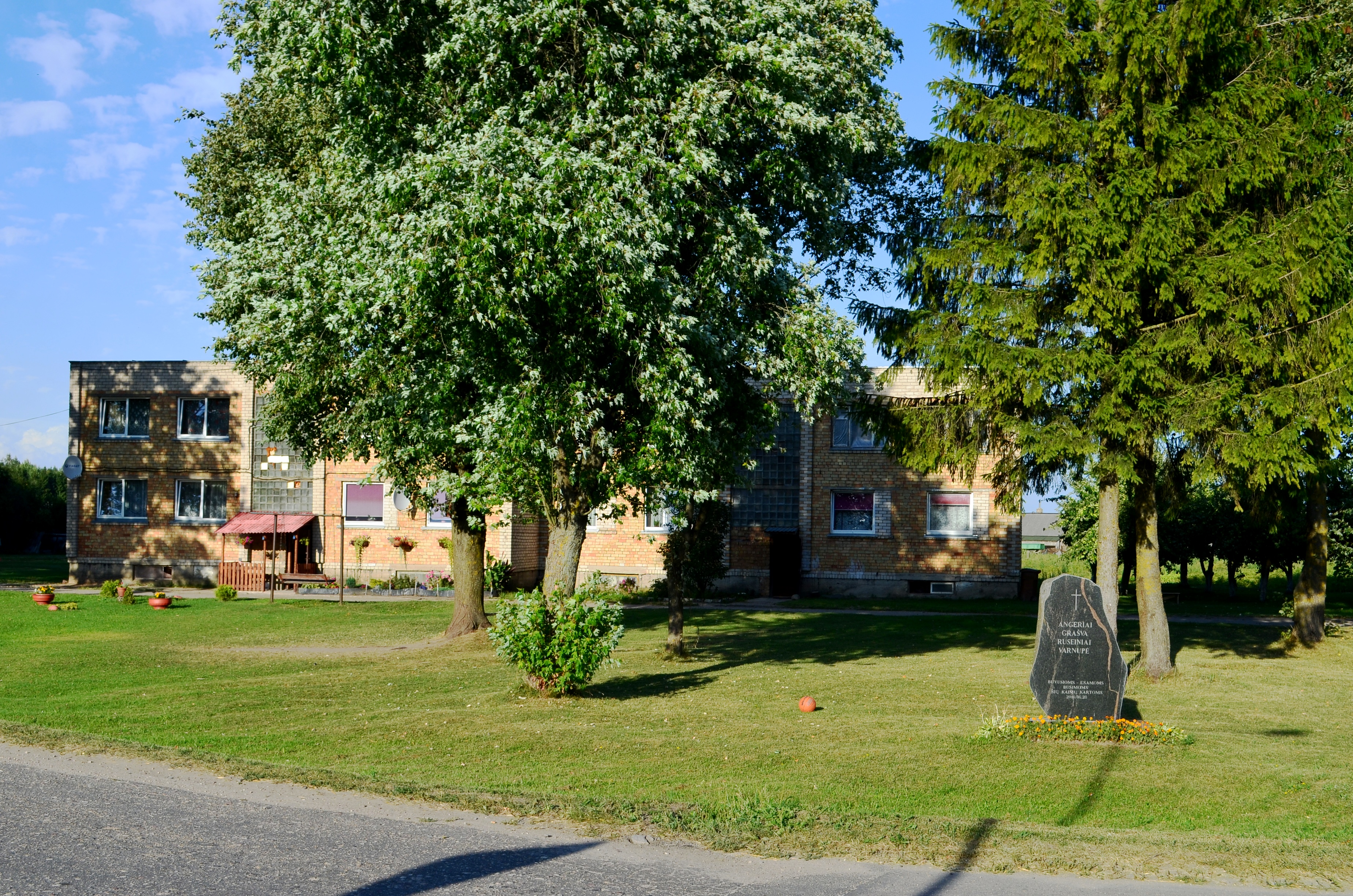
A blockhouse and memorial stone for the villages of Angiriai surroundings

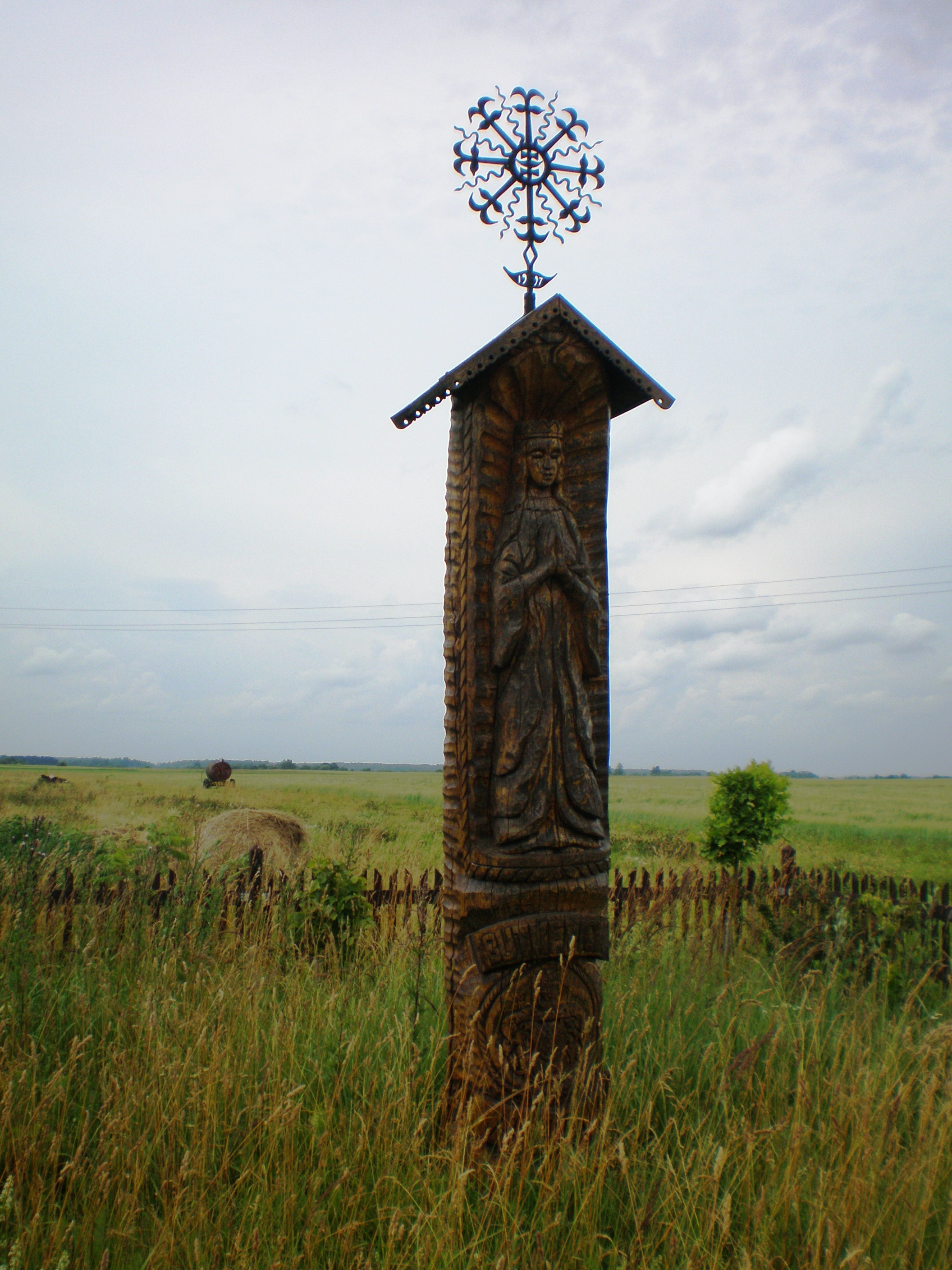
A roofed pole with the image of St. Mary near Angiriai
