= Šušvė =

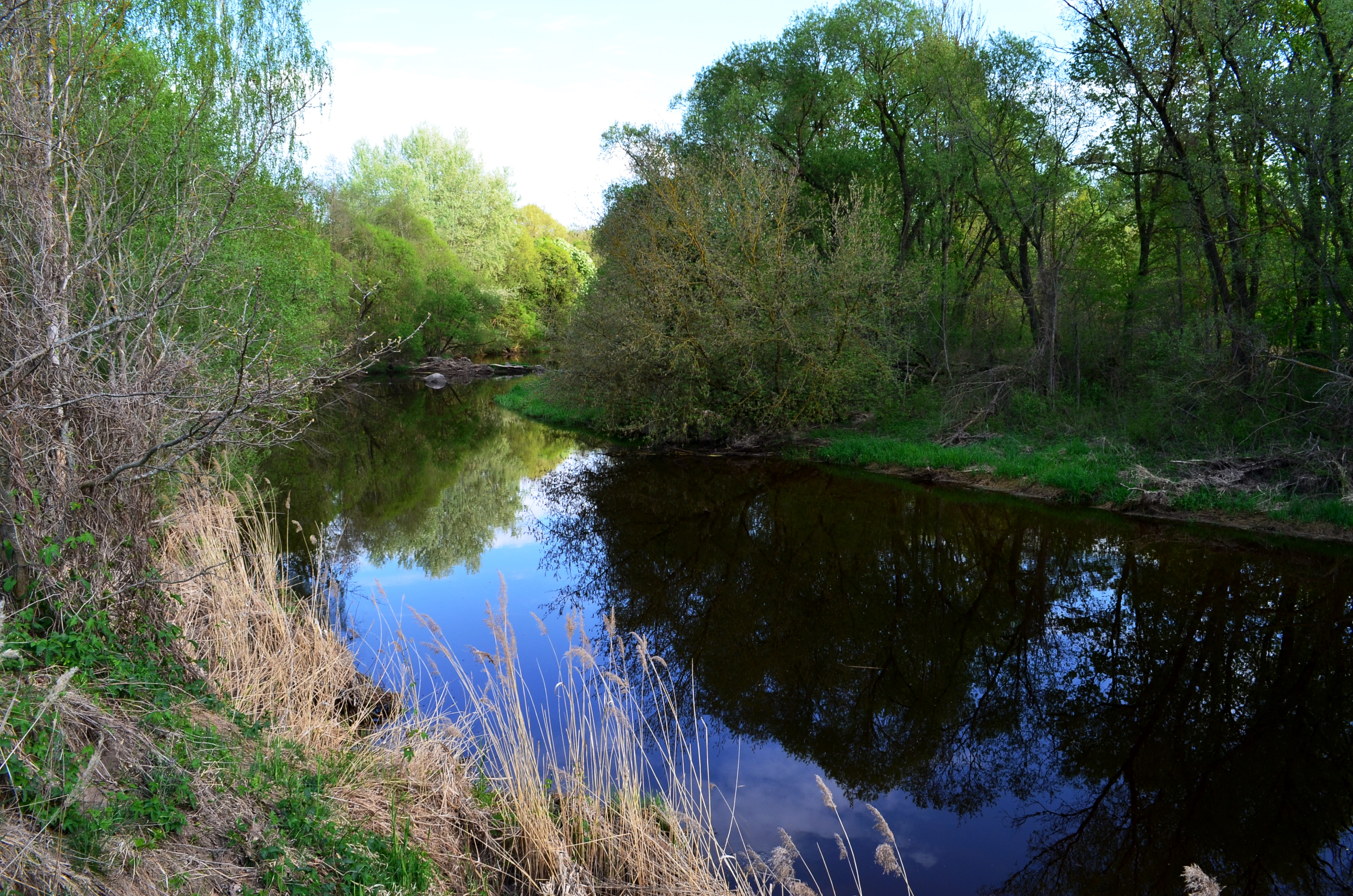
- Šušvė River between Angiriai and Josvainiai

Location
- Country: Lithuania

Physical characteristics
- Source
  - location: near Plekaičiai, Kelmė district municipality
- Mouth: Nevėžis in Paliepiukai
  - coordinates: 55.1732°N 23.8317°E
- Length: 134.6 km (83.6 mi)
- Basin size: 1,165.4 km^{2} (450.0 sq mi)
- Discharge
  - average: 6.22 m^{3}/s (220 cu ft/s)

Basin features
- Progression: Nevėžis→ Neman→ Baltic Sea
- Tributaries
  - left: Beržė, Žiedupė
  - right: Gomerta, Žadikė, Ažytė, Liedas, Lapskojis, Vikšrupis, Putnupys

Šušvė (ˈʃuːʃvʲeː) is a river in central Lithuania, a right (the longest) tributary of the Nevėžis river. It begins in Kelmė district municipality, 6 km (4 mi) southeast from Tytuvėnai. The 134.6 km (83.6 mi) long river passes through Tytuvėnai and Sulinkiai Marshes and flows south through Radviliškis district municipality. Finally, Šušvė passes through Kėdainiai district municipality and flows into the Nevėžis near Graužiai village.

The width of the river valley is between 0.5 and 3 km. From December to March Šušvė is usually frozen. Dams were built at Vaitiekūnai and Angiriai (Angiriai Reservoir). The Šušvė Hydrological Sanctuary was established in 1992 to protect the lower courses of the river.

The main towns and villages by the Šušvė river are Šiaulėnai, Pašušvys (Radviliškis municipality), Grinkiškis, Vaitiekūnai, Pašušvys (Kėdainiai municipality), Angiriai, Josvainiai.

== Tributaries ==
The following rivers are tributaries to the river Šušvė (from source to mouth):

- Left: Šušvaitė, Beržutė, Malštovė, Beržė, Srautas, Krimslė, Paliūnys, Paupelys, Žiedupė;
- Right: Šėta, Upytė, Gomerta, Žadikė, Vedreikė, Miegotas, Ažytė, Skardūnė, Raguva, Pečiupė, Cigoniškė, Žemėplėša, Liedas, Lapskojis, Vikšrupis, Grinčiupys, Putnupys.

== Etymology ==
The name Šušvė (or Šiušvė) comes from the root šuš- as in Lithuanian verbs šiušinti, šiušėti, šiaušti. All of them mean bouth 'to tousle' and onomatopoeicly allude to the sound of water. According to another interpretation, the name Šušvė is related to the Finno-Ugric hydronym Sosva.
