= Piliamantas =

- Village
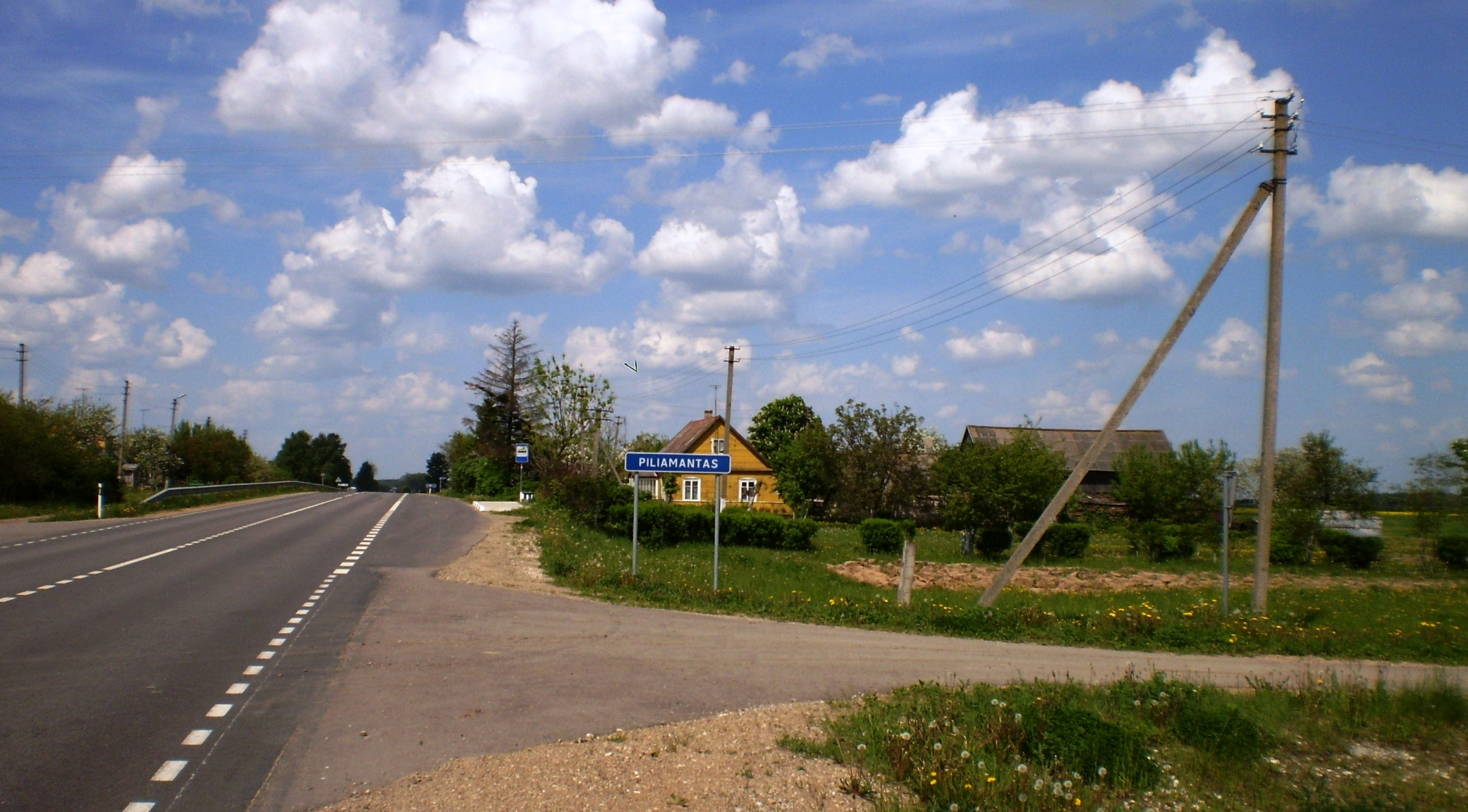

- Location in Lithuania
- Coordinates: 55°27′29″N 23°48′40″E
- Country: Lithuania
- County: Kaunas County
- Municipality: Kėdainiai district municipality
- Eldership: Dotnuva Eldership

Population (2011)
  - Total: 51
- Time zone: UTC+2 (EET)
  - Summer (DST): UTC+3 (EEST)

Piliamantas (formerly Russian: Пилямонтъ) is a village in Kėdainiai district municipality, in Kaunas County, in central Lithuania. According to the 2011 census, the village has a population of 51 people. It is located 1 km from Mantviliškis, by the Dotnuvėlė river and Jonava-Šeduva road.

== Demography ==
Historical population

Year	Pop.	±% p.a.
1902	50	—
1923	181	+6.32%
1959	229	+0.66%
1970	196	−1.40%

Year	Pop.	±% p.a.
1979	118	−5.48%
1989	68	−5.36%
2001	59	−1.18%
2011	51	−1.45%

Source: 1902, 1923, 1959 & 1970, 1979, 1989, 2001, 2011
