= Vainotiškiai =

- Village
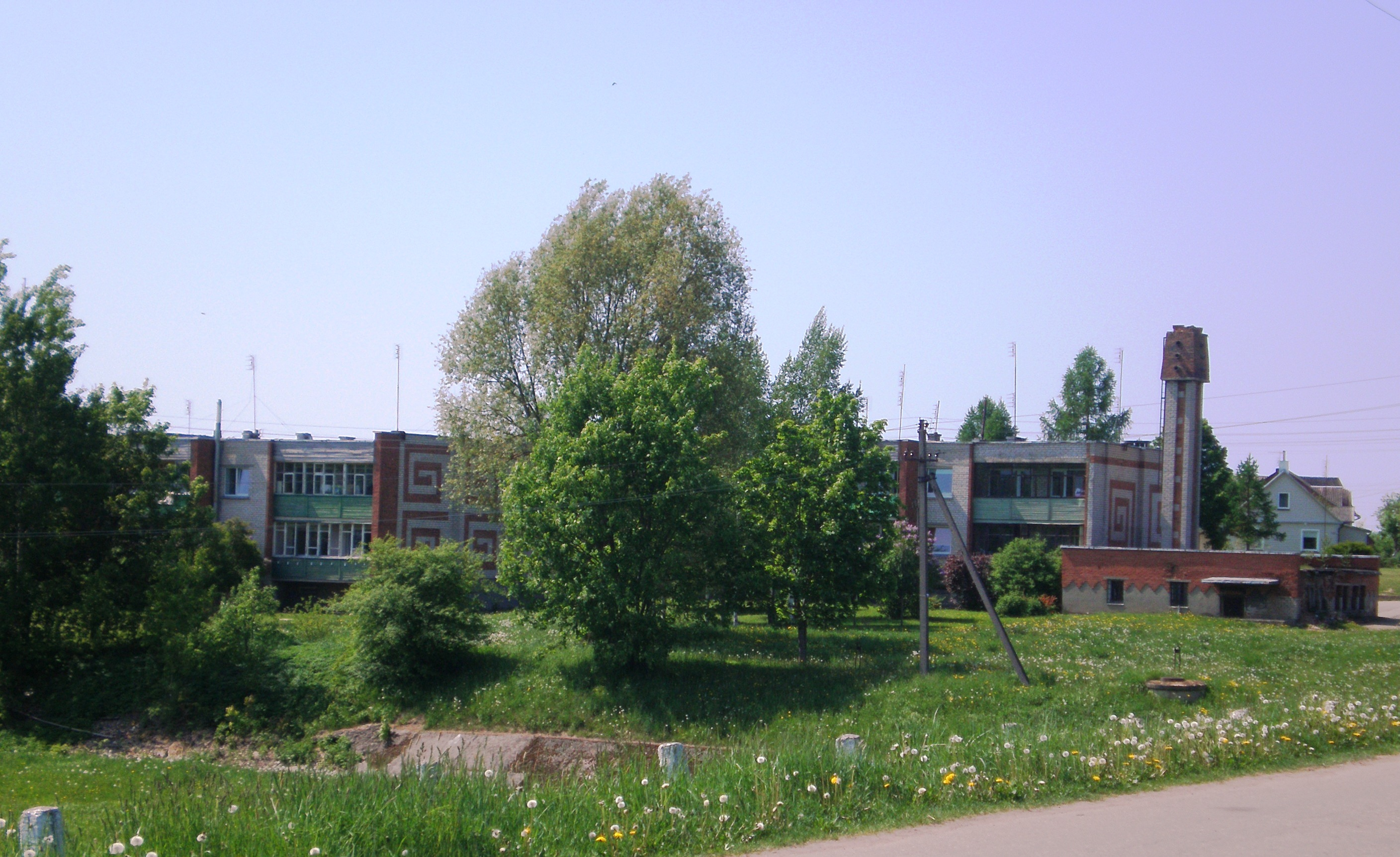

- Location in Lithuania Vainotiškiai (Lithuania)
- Coordinates: 55°24′00″N 23°50′31″E
- Country: Lithuania
- County: Kaunas County
- Municipality: Kėdainiai district municipality
- Eldership: Dotnuva Eldership

Population (2011)
  - Total: 909
- Time zone: UTC+2 (EET)
  - Summer (DST): UTC+3 (EEST)

Vainotiškiai (formerly Russian: Войнатышки) is a village in Kėdainiai district municipality, in Kaunas County, in central Lithuania. According to the 2011 census, the village has a population of 909 people. It is located nearby Akademija, between Akademija pond (the Dotnuvėlė river) and the Kačupys river.

There is ancient burial ground.

== Demography ==
Historical population

Year	Pop.	±% p.a.
1820	76	—
1902	211	+1.25%
1923	260	+1.00%
1959	233	−0.30%

Year	Pop.	±% p.a.
1970	308	+2.57%
1979	547	+6.59%
1987	1,046	+8.44%
1989	1,110	+3.01%

Year	Pop.	±% p.a.
2001	1,058	−0.40%
2011	909	−1.51%

Source: 1902, 1923, 1959 & 1970, 1979, 1989, 2001, 2011
