= Vincgalys =

- Village
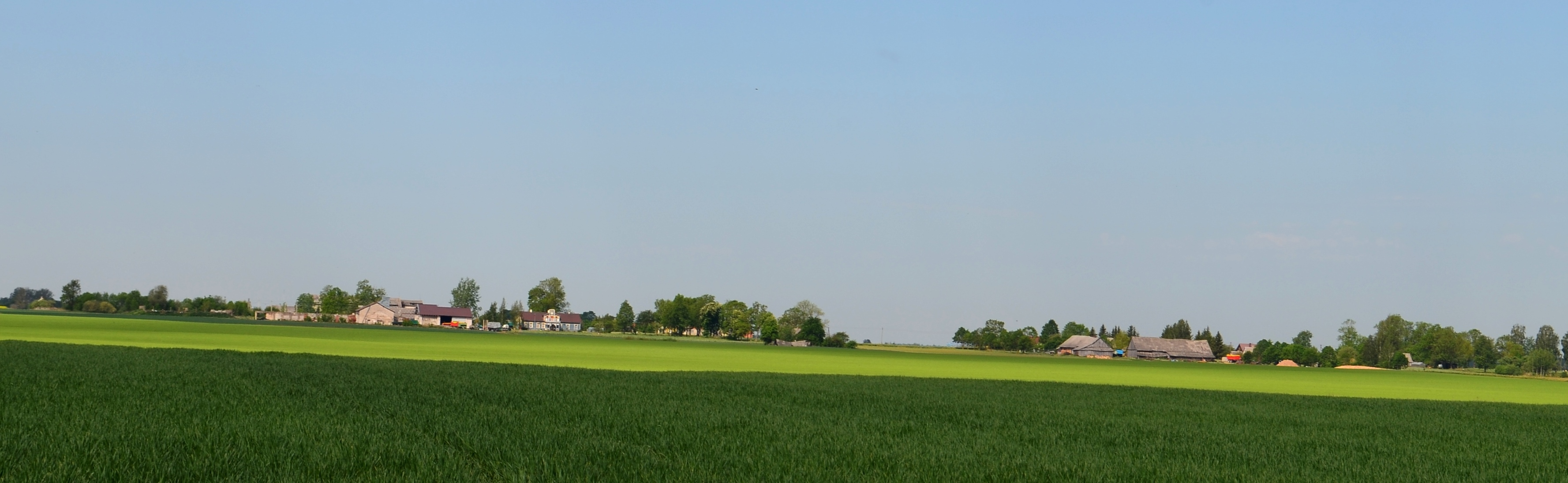

- Location in Lithuania Vincgalys (Lithuania)
- Coordinates: 55°24′11″N 23°55′41″E
- Country: Lithuania
- County: Kaunas County
- Municipality: Kėdainiai district municipality
- Eldership: Dotnuva Eldership

Population (2011)
  - Total: 60
- Time zone: UTC+2 (EET)
  - Summer (DST): UTC+3 (EEST)

Vincgalys (formerly Polish: Wendzgol, Wędzgol, Wendziul, Russian: Вендзголь) is a village in Kėdainiai district municipality, in Kaunas County, in central Lithuania. According to the 2011 census, the village has a population of 60 people. It is located 2 km from Šlapaberžė. There is wooden manor house, built at the end of the 18th century in Vincgalys village.

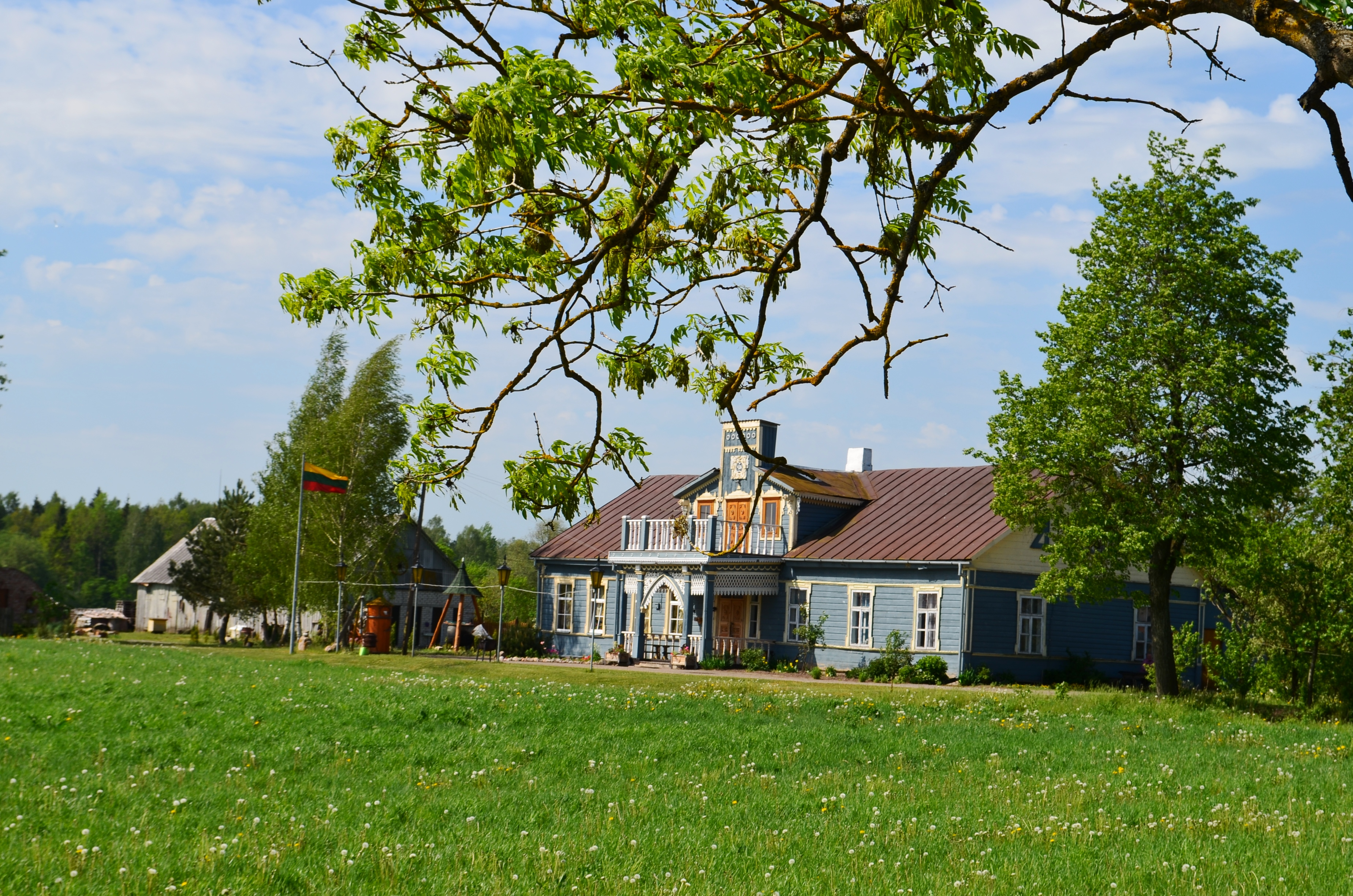
Vincgalys manor

== Demography ==
Historical population

Year	Pop.	±% p.a.
1902	96	—
1923	67	−1.70%
1959	201	+3.10%
1970	163	−1.89%

Year	Pop.	±% p.a.
1979	109	−4.37%
1989	81	−2.93%
2001	71	−1.09%
2011	60	−1.67%

Source: 1902, 1923, 1959 & 1970, 1979, 1989, 2001, 2011
