= Dotnuvos Geležinkelio Stotis =

- Village
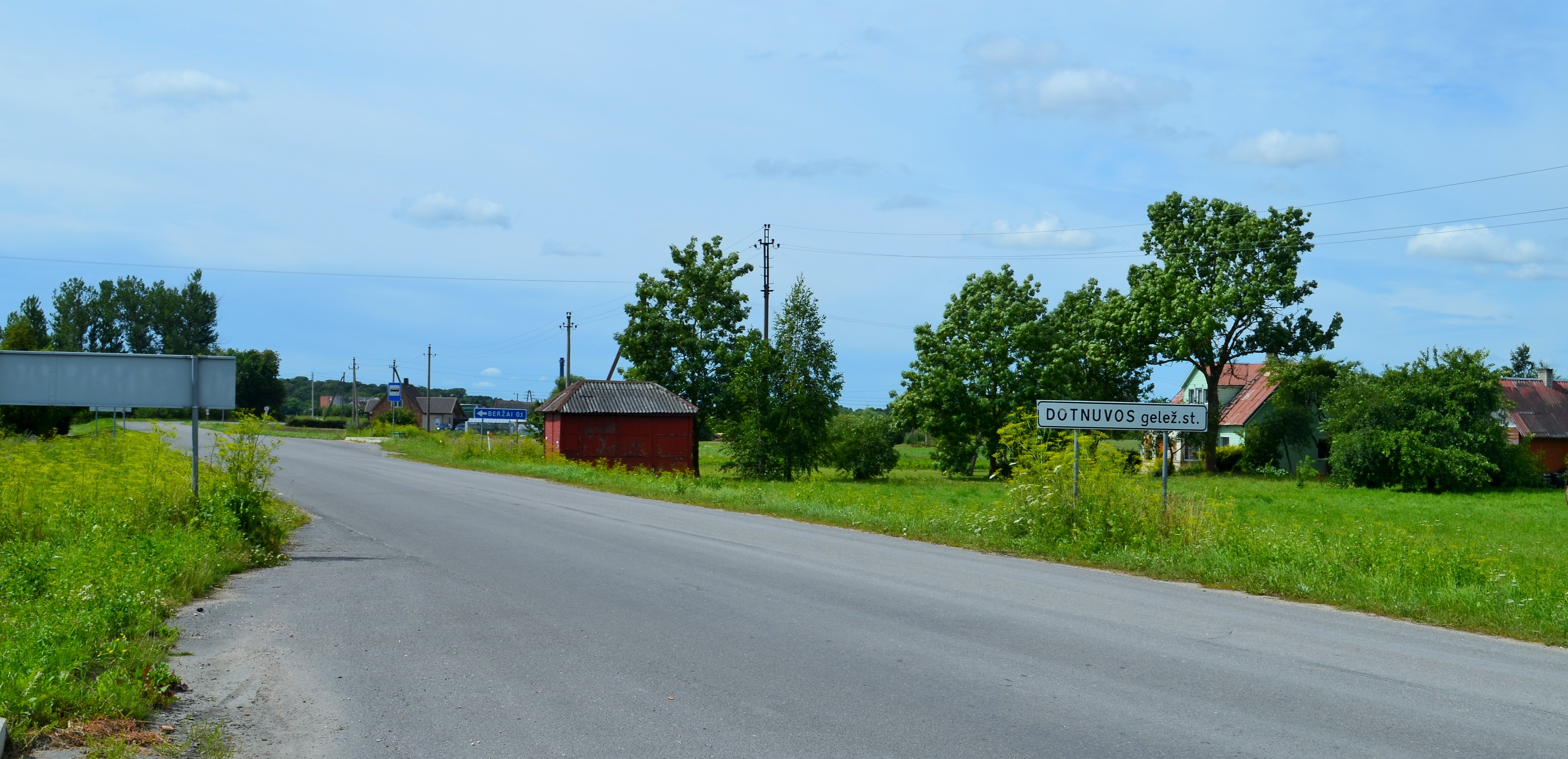

- Location in Lithuania Dotnuvos Geležinkelio Stotis (Lithuania)
- Coordinates: 55°24′25″N 23°52′40″E
- Country: Lithuania
- County: Kaunas County
- Municipality: Kėdainiai district municipality
- Eldership: Dotnuva eldership

Population (2011)
  - Total: 65
- Time zone: UTC+2 (EET)
  - Summer (DST): UTC+3 (EEST)

Dotnuva railway station Dotnuvos geležinkelio stotis
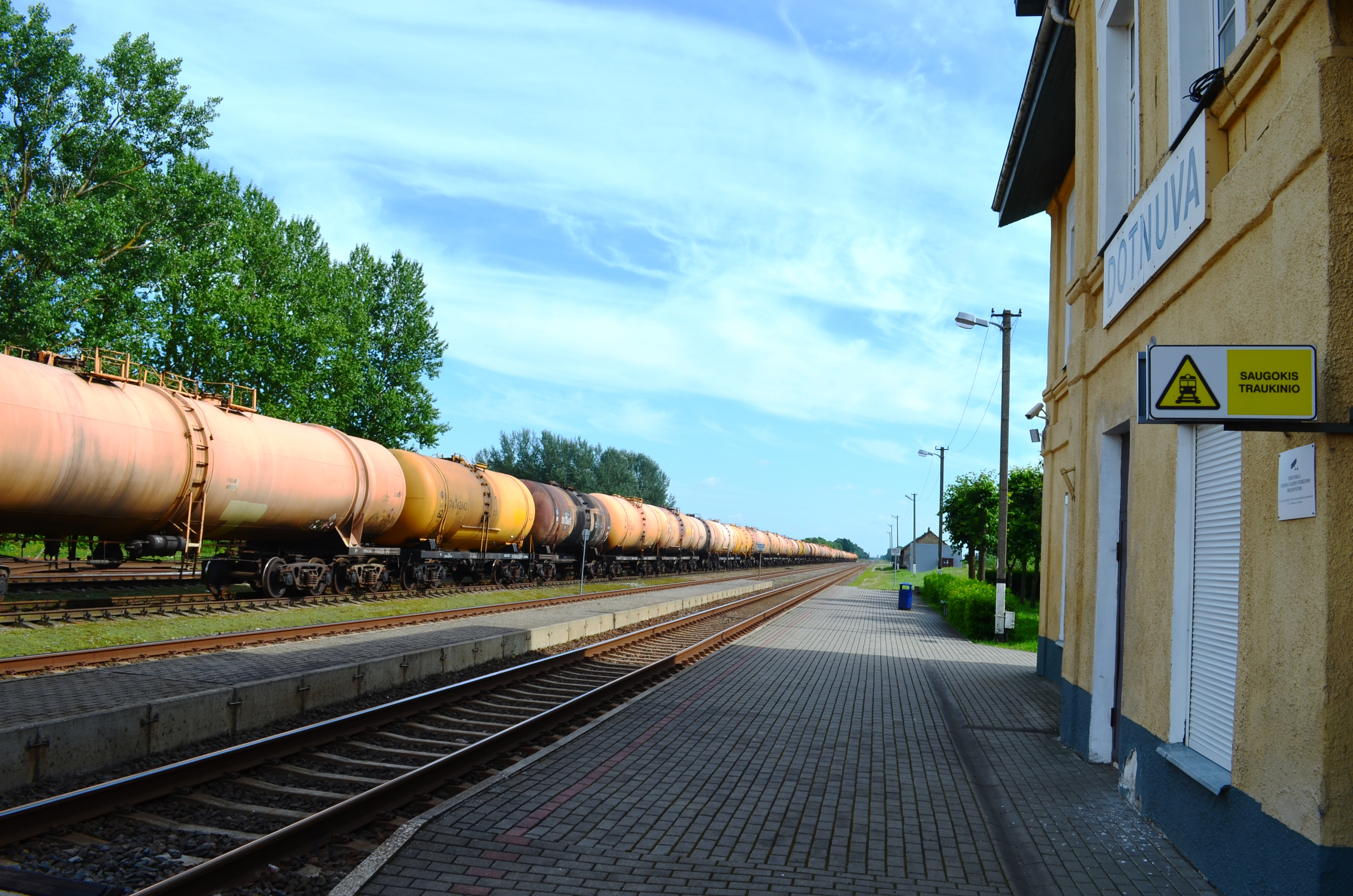

General information
- Location: Lithuania
- Operator: Lietuvos geležinkeliai
- Line: Šiauliai–Kaunas
- Platforms: 2
- Train operators: Lietuvos geležinkeliai

Other information
- Website: www.litrail.lt
Location

Dotnuvos Geležinkelio Stotis ('Dotnuva' Railway Station') is a village in central Lithuania, developed around and named after the railway station serving the neighbouring towns of Dotnuva and Akademija.

== Train Station ==
After Vilnius-Kaunas-Šiauliai service was discontinued and Vilnius-Klaipėda acquired the status of a fast train, there were no passenger trains stopping at the station. However, after successful campaigning by the local community, the trains now stop at the station on Fridays and Sundays as part of Šiauliai–Kaunas service.

== Village ==
According to the 2011 census, the village has a population of 65 people.

== Demography ==
Historical population

Year	Pop.	±% p.a.
1959	146	—
1970	156	+0.60%
1979	110	−3.81%

Year	Pop.	±% p.a.
1989	82	−2.89%
2001	89	+0.68%
2011	65	−3.09%

Source: 1902, 1923, 1959 & 1970, 1979, 1989, 2001, 2011
