= Žemaičiai, Kėdainiai =

Žemaičiai
- Village
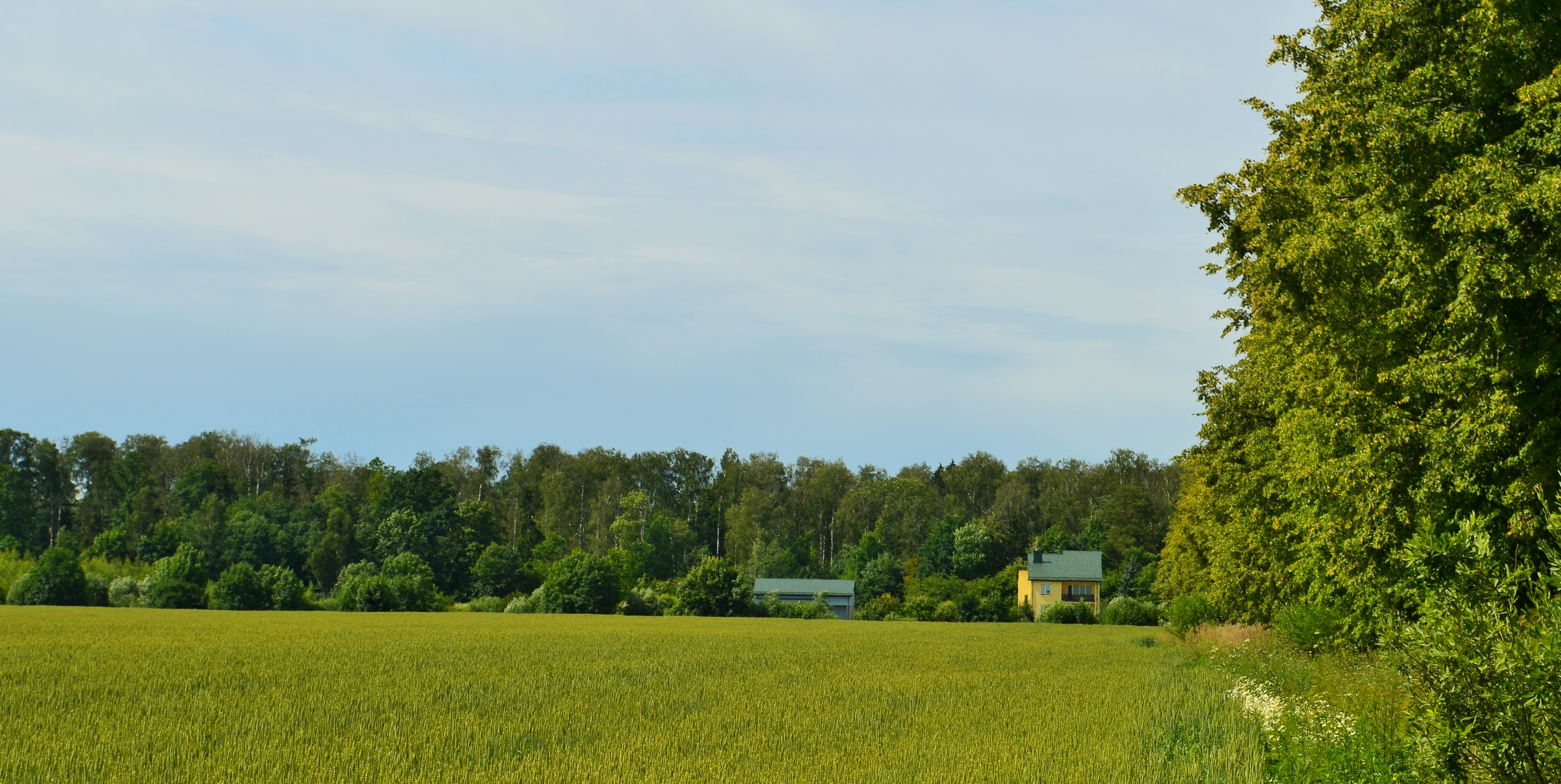

- Location in Lithuania
- Coordinates: 55°23′31″N 23°51′07″E
- Country: Lithuania
- County: Kaunas County
- Municipality: Kėdainiai district municipality
- Eldership: Dotnuva Eldership

Population (2011)
  - Total: 12
- Time zone: UTC+2 (EET)
  - Summer (DST): UTC+3 (EEST)

Žemaičiai ('The Samogitians') is a village in the Kėdainiai district municipality, in Kaunas County, in central Lithuania. According to the 2011 census, the village has a population of 12 people. It is located 4 km from Dotnuva, by the Jaugila river and Krakės-Dotnuva forest. The old lime alley goes along the way from Akademija, Kėdainiai to Žemaičiai.

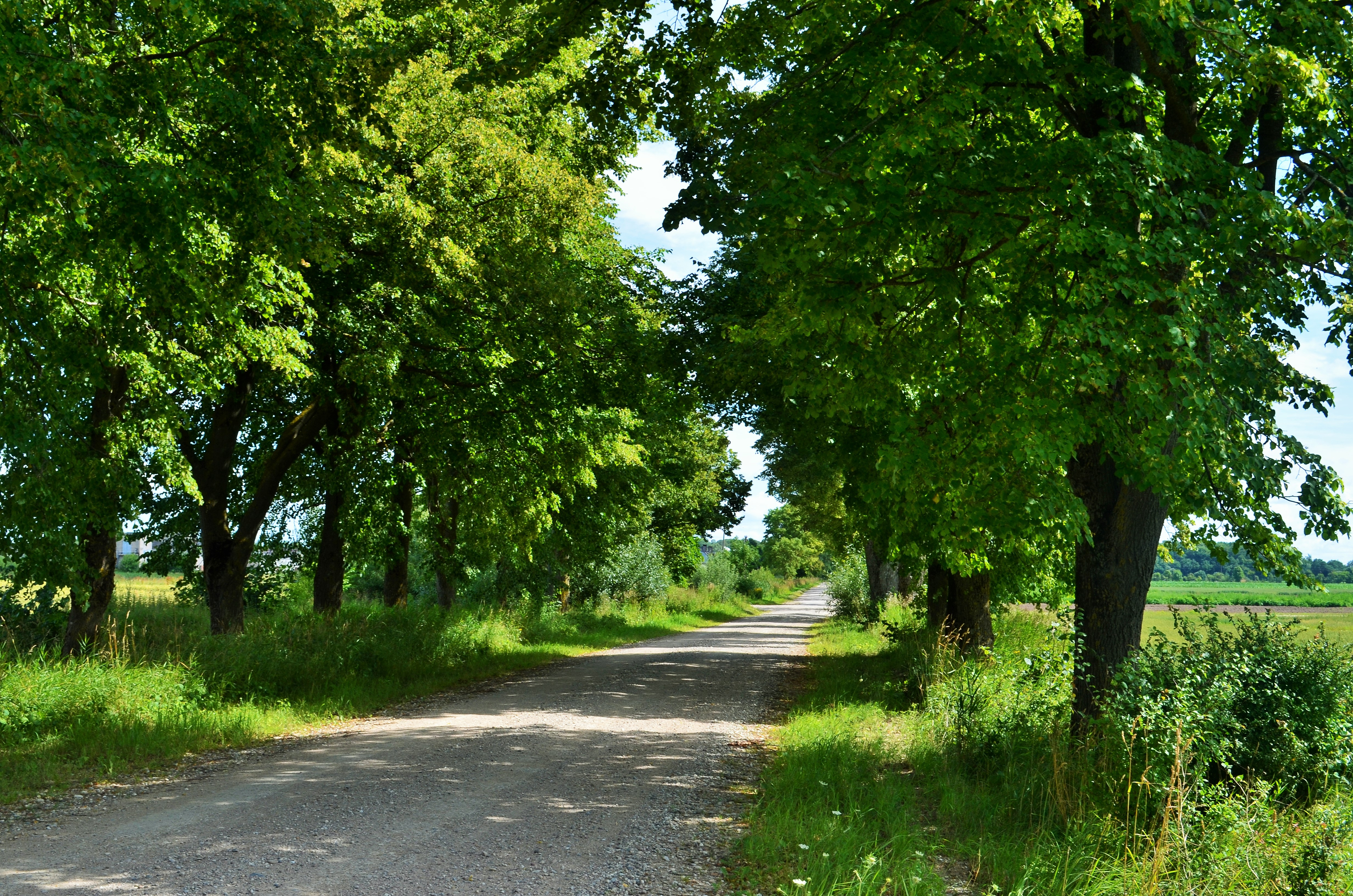
Lime tree alley to Žemaičiai

== Demography ==
Historical population

Year	Pop.	±% p.a.
1959	66	—
1970	46	−3.23%
1979	20	−8.84%

Year	Pop.	±% p.a.
1989	43	+7.96%
2001	9	−12.22%
2011	12	+2.92%

Source: 1902, 1923, 1959 & 1970, 1979, 1989, 2001, 2011
