= Dotnuva Eldership =

Dotnuva Eldership Dotnuvos seniūnija
- Eldership
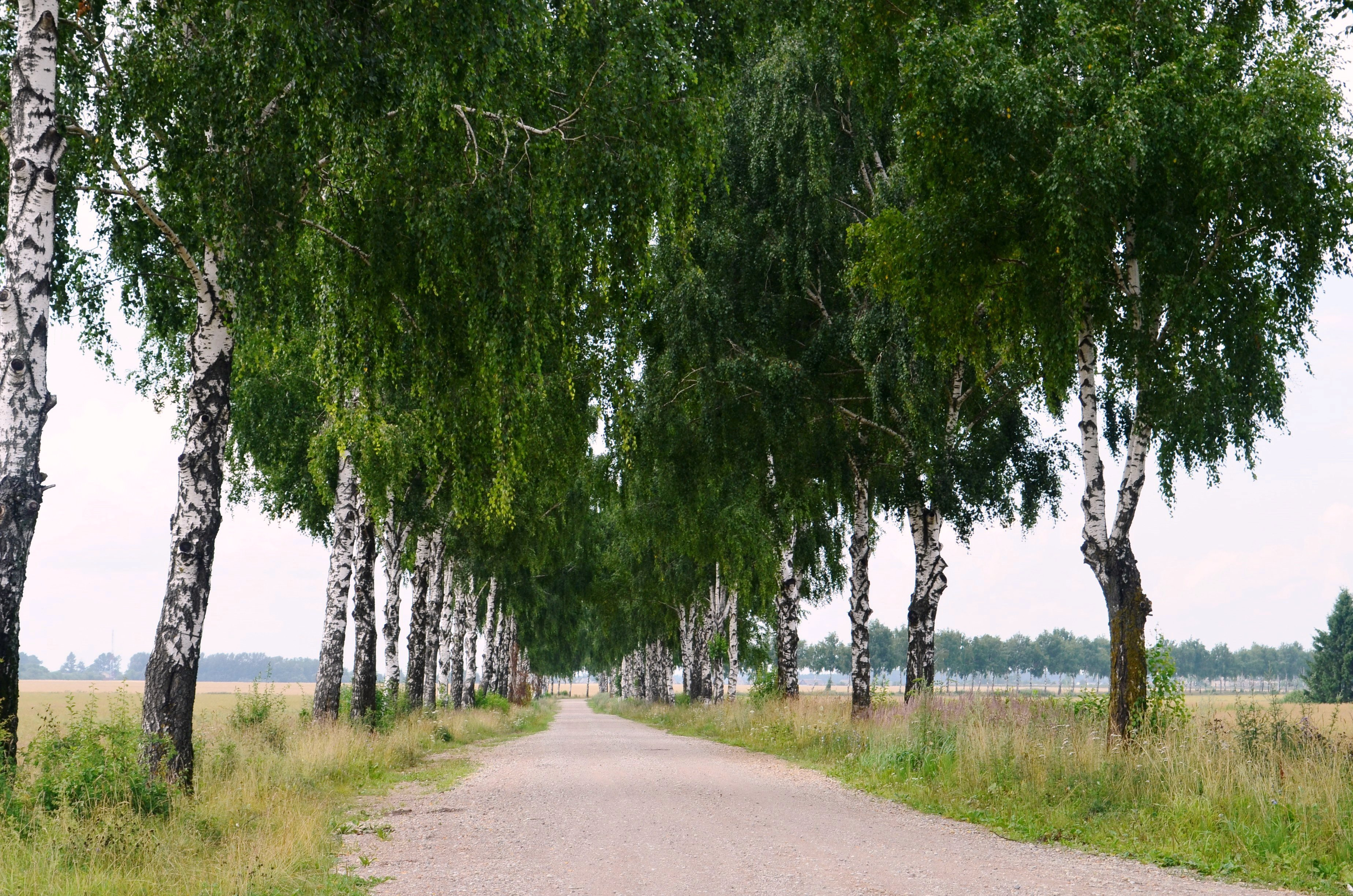
- Birch alley in the Sandzėnai village

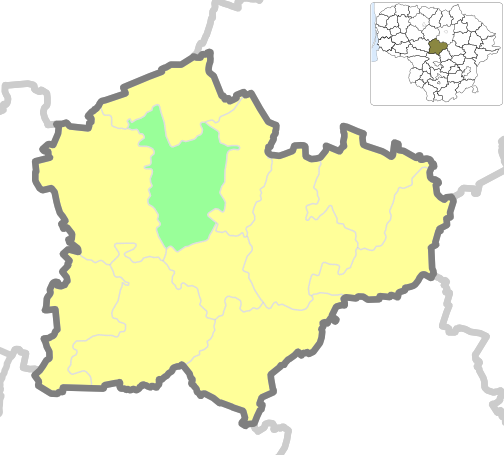
- Location of Dotnuva city eldership
- Country: Lithuania
- Ethnographic region: Aukštaitija
- County: Kaunas County
- Municipality: Kėdainiai District Municipality
- Administrative centre: Dotnuva

Area
  - Total: 138 km^{2} (53 sq mi)

Population (2011)
  - Total: 4,758
  - Density: 34.5/km^{2} (89.3/sq mi)
- Time zone: UTC+2 (EET)
  - Summer (DST): UTC+3 (EEST)

Dotnuva Eldership (Lithuanian: Dotnuvos seniūnija) is a Lithuanian eldership, located in a central part of Kėdainiai District Municipality.

Eldership was created from the Dotnuva selsovet in 1993.

== Geography ==
All the territory is in Nevėžis plain.

- Rivers: Dotnuvėlė, Jaugila, Kruostas, Kačupys;
- Lakes and ponds: Akademija pond, Mantviliškis pond, Urnėžiai pond, Vaidatoniai pond;
- Forests: Krakės-Dotnuva forest;
- Protected areas: Mociūnai forest botanical sanctuary;
- Nature monuments: Ožakmenis stone.

== Populated places ==
Following settlements are located in the Dontuva Eldership (as for 2011 census):

- Towns: Akademija · Dotnuva
- Villages: Aušra · Ąžuolaičiai · Beržai · Bokštai · Gėlainiai · Jaunakaimis · Mantviliškis · Naujaberžė · Naujieji Bakainiai · Naujieji Lažai · Noreikiai · Padotnuvys · Piliamantas · Pilioniai · Puodžiai · Ramėnai · Sandzėnai · Siponiai · · Šalčmiriai · Šiaudinė · Šlapaberžė · Urnėžiai · Vainotiškiai · Valinava · Valučiai · Vincgalys · Žemaičiai
- Hamlets: Bakšiai · Pupėnai · Stukai · Zacišiai
- Railway settlements: Dotnuva GS
