= Lithuanian Plants Genes Bank =

Plant gene organization in Lithuania

Lithuanian Plants Genes Bank (Lithuanian: Augalų genų bankas, AGB) is plant gene resource guardian and sustainable use organization governed by Lithuania's Ministry of Environment. Its headquarters based in Akademija, Kėdainiai, Central Lithuania.

In 1997 the plant storage started to operate. In 2004 the Lithuanian Plants Gene Bank was established and the seed storage became a part of it. By 2017 it had 3318 samples from 201 variety of different kind of plants.
