= Krakės (village) =

- Village
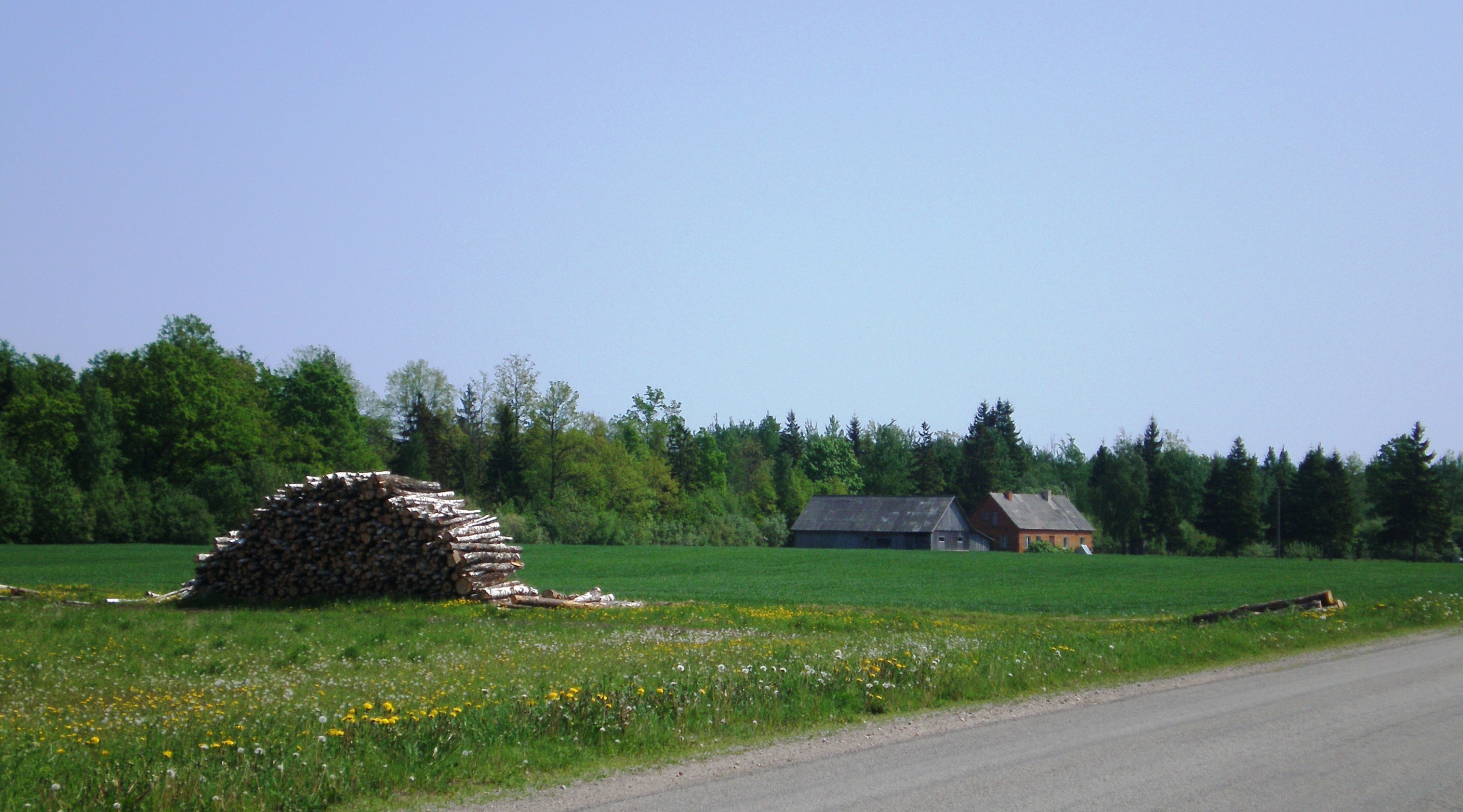

- Location in Lithuania Krakės (Lithuania)
- Coordinates: 55°24′00″N 23°43′30″E
- Country: Lithuania
- County: Kaunas County
- Municipality: Kėdainiai district municipality
- Eldership: Krakės Eldership

Population (2011)
  - Total: 32
- Time zone: UTC+2 (EET)
  - Summer (DST): UTC+3 (EEST)

Krakės is a village in Kėdainiai district municipality, in Kaunas County, in central Lithuania. According to the 2011 census, the village had a population of 32 people. The village surrounds Krakės town and is dispersed along the roads leading to Bokštai, Kėdainiai, and Grinkiškis. At the eastern side, nearby the Krakės-Dotnuva Forest there is old Jewish cemetery of the Krakės Jews.

At the beginning of the 20th century there was Žydkapiai ('Jewish graves', Russian: Жидкапе) village nearby Krakės town.

== Demography ==
Historical population

Year	Pop.	±% p.a.
1902	76	—
1923	91	+0.86%
1959	159	+1.56%
1970	99	−4.22%

Year	Pop.	±% p.a.
1979	37	−10.36%
1989	24	−4.24%
2001	25	+0.34%
2011	32	+2.50%

Source: 1902, 1923, 1959 & 1970, 1979, 1989, 2001, 2011

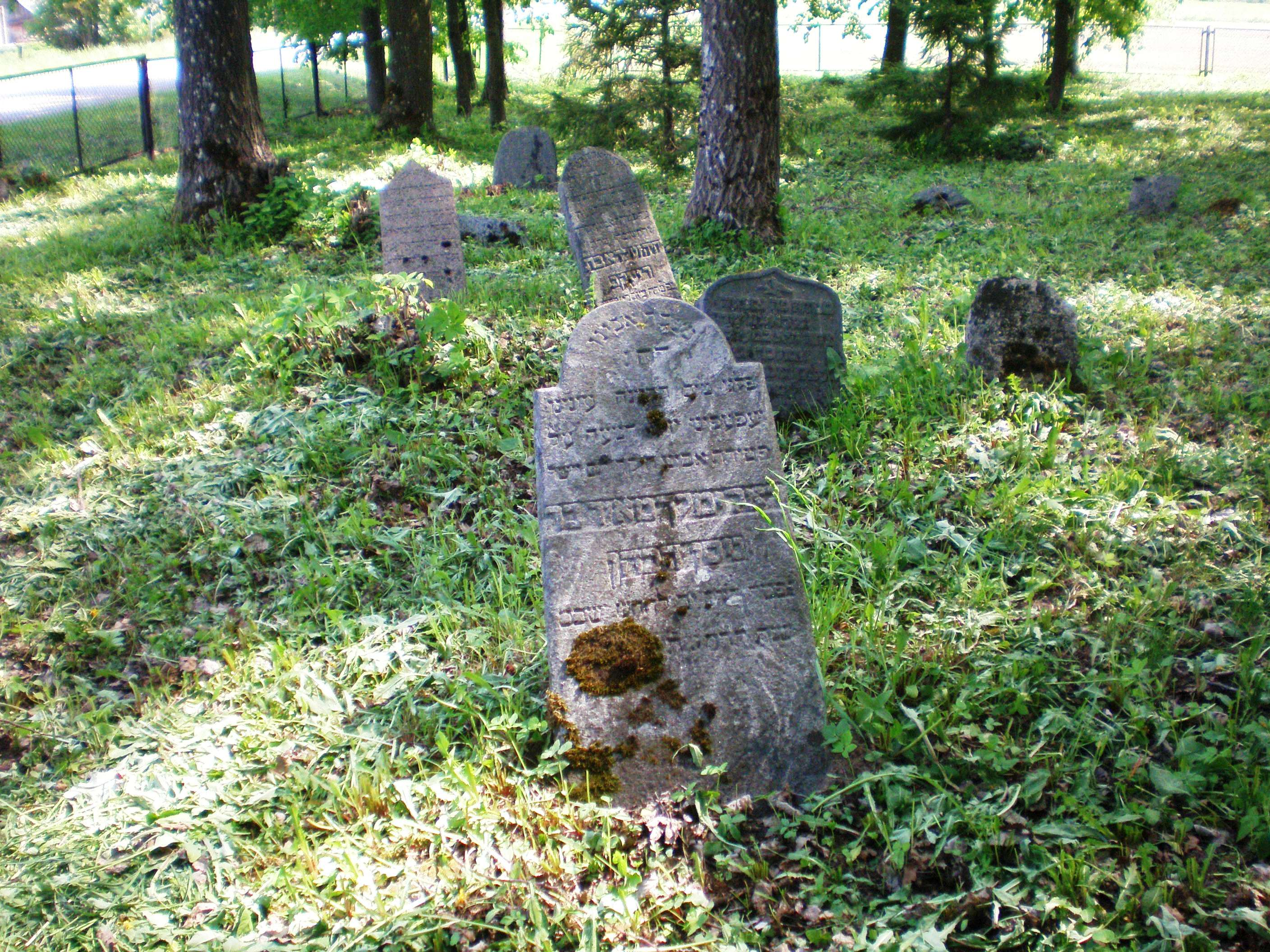
Jewish cemetery of Krakės
