= Gėlainiai =

- Village
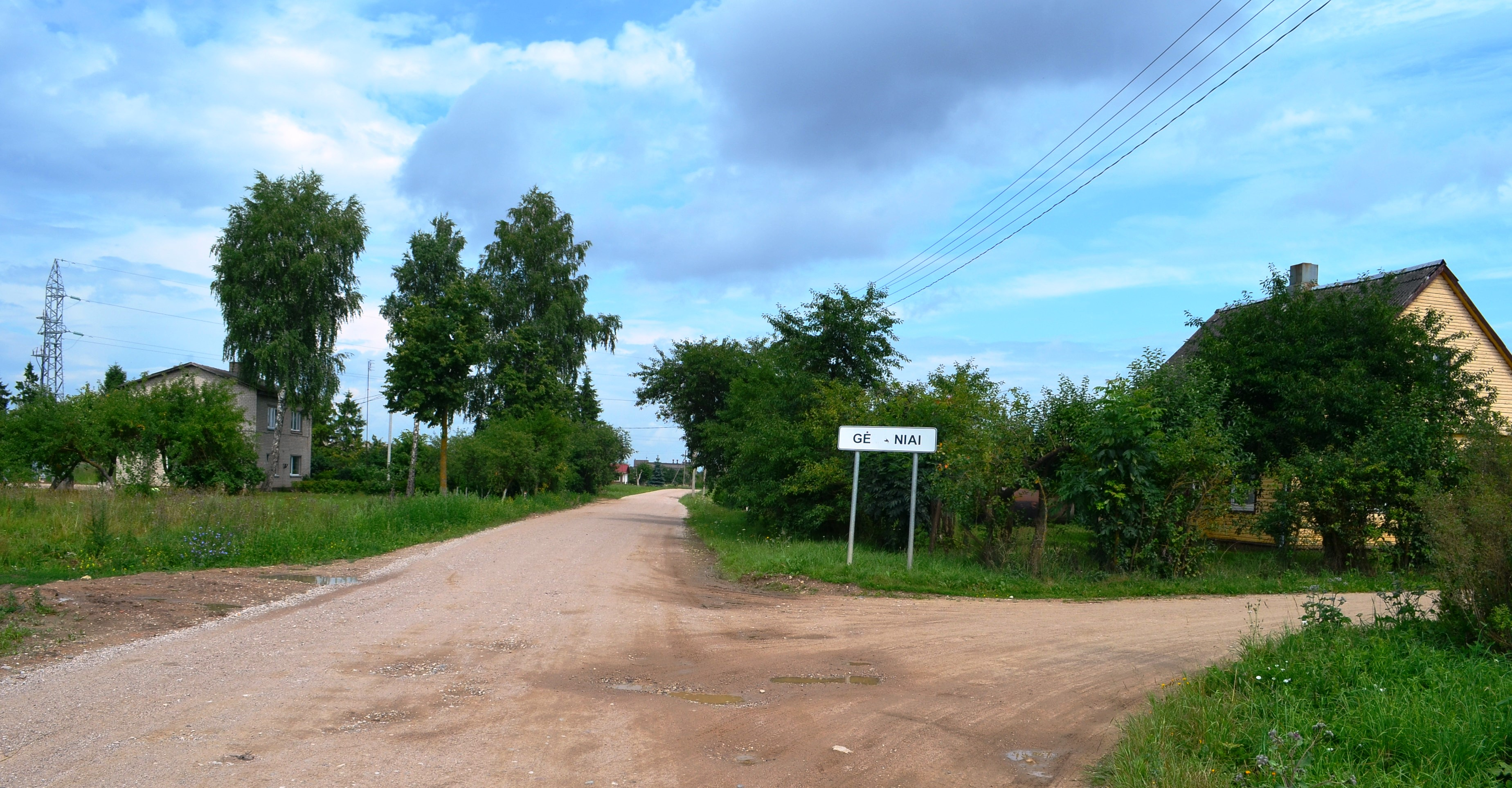

- Location in Lithuania
- Coordinates: 55°22′19″N 23°53′38″E
- Country: Lithuania
- County: Kaunas County
- Municipality: Kėdainiai district municipality
- Eldership: Dotnuva Eldership

Population (2011)
  - Total: 13
- Time zone: UTC+2 (EET)
  - Summer (DST): UTC+3 (EEST)

Gėlainiai is a village in Kėdainiai district municipality, in Kaunas County, in central Lithuania. According to the 2011 census, the village has a population of 13 people. The village is located 0.5 km (0.31 mi) from Dotnuva, by Vilnius-Šiauliai railway. There is Akademija cemetery in Gėlainiai.

== Demography ==
Historical population

Year	Pop.	±% p.a.
1902	8	—
1959	116	+4.80%
1970	87	−2.58%
1979	20	−15.07%

Year	Pop.	±% p.a.
1989	13	−4.22%
2001	21	+4.08%
2011	13	−4.68%

Source: 1902, 1923, 1959 & 1970, 1979, 1989, 2001, 2011
