= Šalčmiriai =

- Village
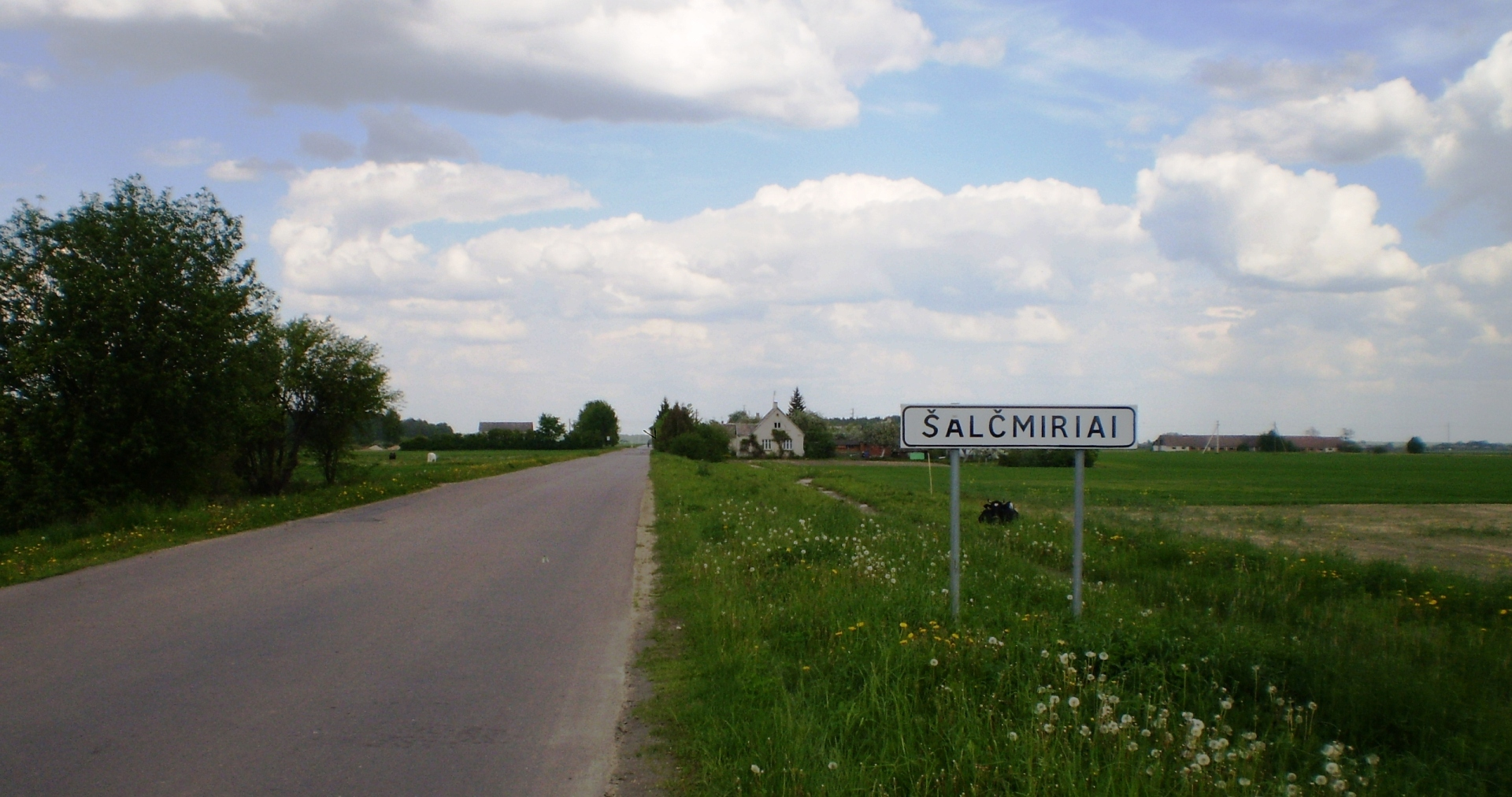

- Location in Lithuania
- Coordinates: 55°24′50″N 23°52′59″E
- Country: Lithuania
- County: Kaunas County
- Municipality: Kėdainiai district municipality
- Eldership: Dotnuva Eldership

Population (2011)
  - Total: 26
- Time zone: UTC+2 (EET)
  - Summer (DST): UTC+3 (EEST)

Šalčmiriai (formerly Russian: Шальзмиры) is a village in Kėdainiai district municipality, in Kaunas County, in central Lithuania. According to the 2011 census, the village has a population of 26 people. It is located 3 km from Akademija by the Kunkulis rivulet.

== Demography ==
Historical population

Year	Pop.	±% p.a.
1902	32	—
1923	47	+1.85%
1959	80	+1.49%
1970	78	−0.23%

Year	Pop.	±% p.a.
1979	43	−6.40%
1989	36	−1.76%
2001	31	−1.24%
2011	26	−1.74%

Source: 1902, 1923, 1959 & 1970, 1979, 1989, 2001, 2011
