= Pilioniai =

- Village
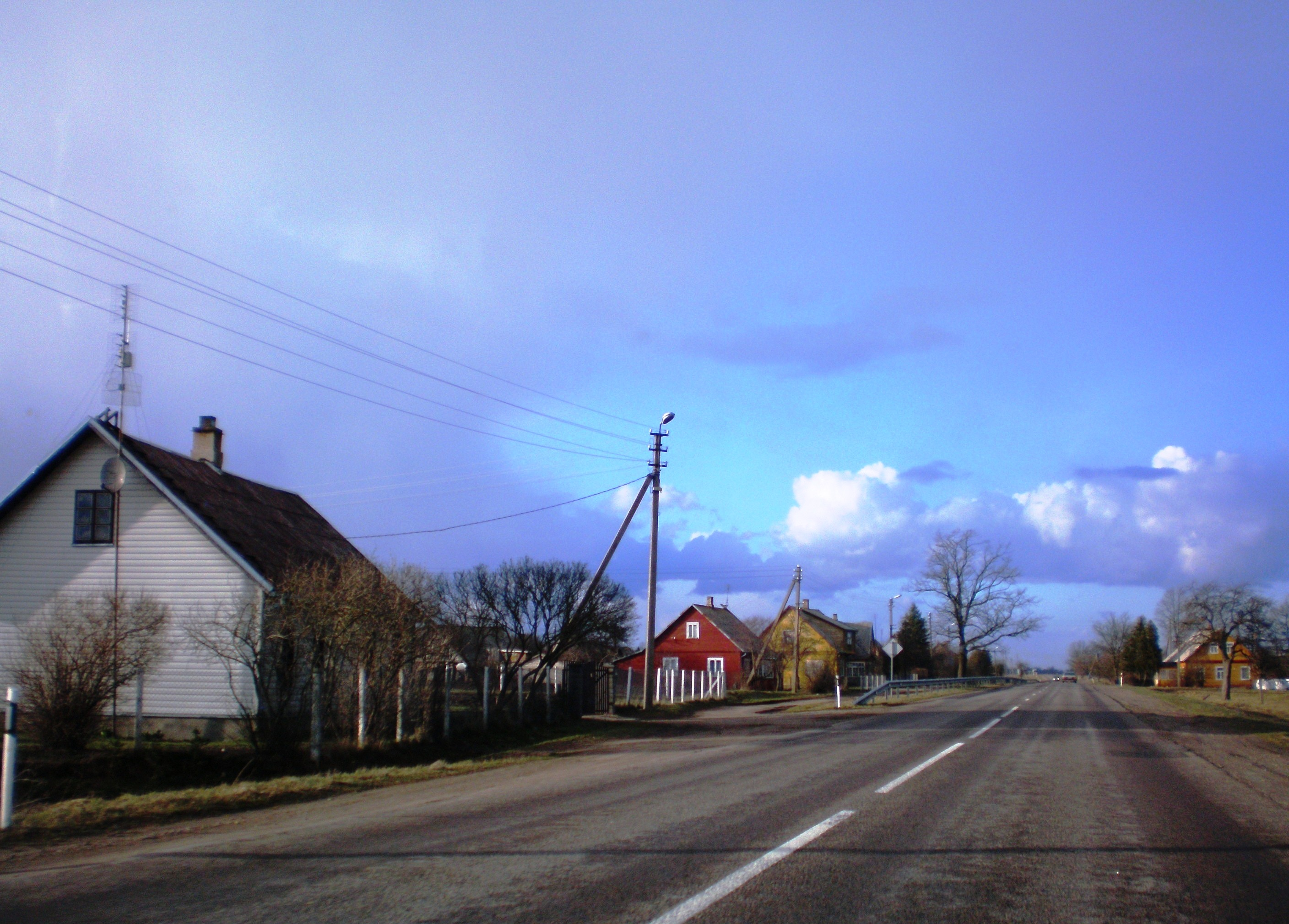

- Location in Lithuania Pilioniai (Lithuania)
- Coordinates: 55°28′0″N 23°48′0″E
- Country: Lithuania
- County: Kaunas County
- Municipality: Kėdainiai district municipality
- Eldership: Dotnuva eldership

Population (2011)
  - Total: 57
- Time zone: UTC+2 (EET)
  - Summer (DST): UTC+3 (EEST)

Pilioniai is a village in Kėdainiai district municipality, in Kaunas County, in central Lithuania. It is located by the Dotnuvėlė river and Mantviliškis pond. According to the 2011 census, the village has a population of 57 people. There is a hillfort and a chapel on its top in Pilioniai.

== Demography ==
Historical population

Year	Pop.	±% p.a.
1902	173	—
1923	196	+0.60%
1959	232	+0.47%
1970	184	−2.09%

Year	Pop.	±% p.a.
1979	115	−5.09%
1989	75	−4.18%
2001	89	+1.44%
2011	57	−4.36%

Source: 1902, 1923, 1959 & 1970, 1979, 1989, 2001, 2011
