= Valinava =

- Village
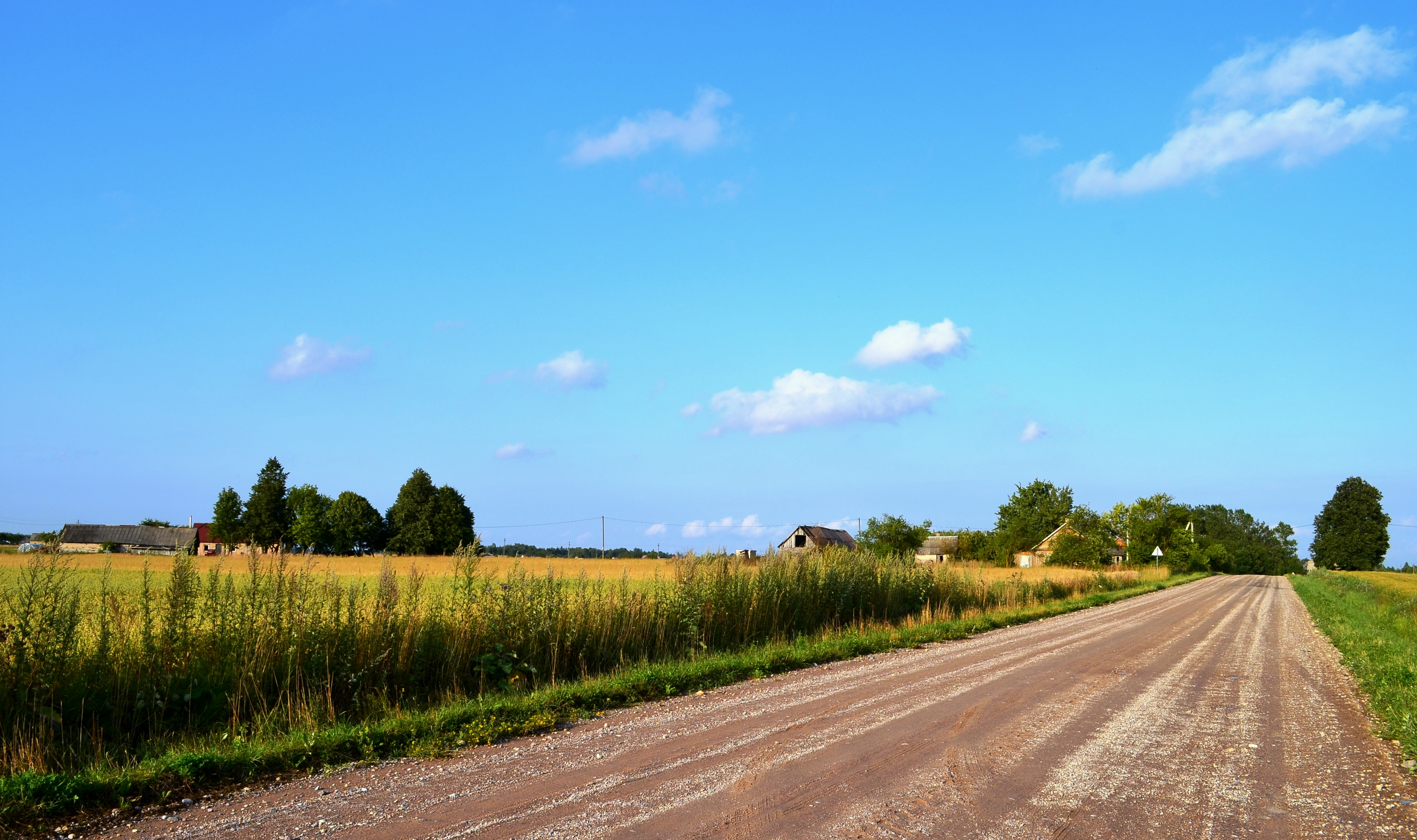

- Location in Lithuania
- Coordinates: 55°22′01″N 23°51′40″E
- Country: Lithuania
- County: Kaunas County
- Municipality: Kėdainiai district municipality
- Eldership: Dotnuva Eldership

Population (2011)
  - Total: 28
- Time zone: UTC+2 (EET)
  - Summer (DST): UTC+3 (EEST)

Valinava is a village in Kėdainiai district municipality, in Kaunas County, in central Lithuania. According to the 2011 census, the village has a population of 28 people. It is located 1 km from Dotnuva, by the Dotnuvėlė river.

== Demography ==
Historical population

Year	Pop.	±% p.a.
1923	109	—
1959	135	+0.60%
1970	101	−2.60%
1979	56	−6.34%

Year	Pop.	±% p.a.
1989	33	−5.15%
2001	30	−0.79%
2011	28	−0.69%

Source: 1902, 1923, 1959 & 1970, 1979, 1989, 2001, 2011
