= Naujieji Bakainiai =

- Village
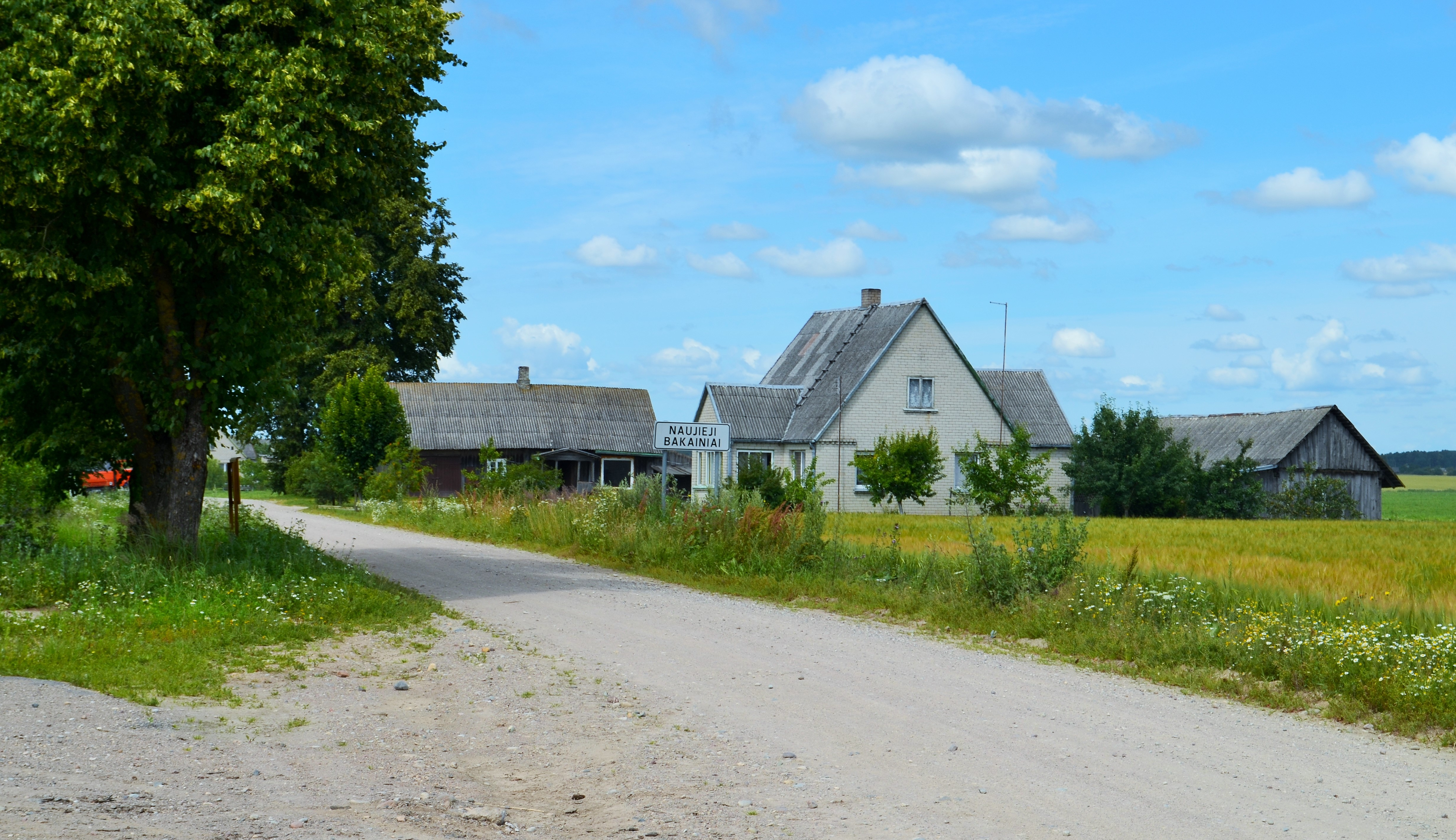

- Location in Lithuania Naujieji Bakainiai (Lithuania)
- Coordinates: 55°27′0″N 23°56′31″E
- Country: Lithuania
- County: Kaunas County
- Municipality: Kėdainiai district municipality
- Eldership: Dotnuva Eldership

Population (2011)
  - Total: 30
- Time zone: UTC+2 (EET)
  - Summer (DST): UTC+3 (EEST)

Naujieji Bakainiai (formerly Russian: Бакайни-Новые) is a village in Kėdainiai district municipality, in Kaunas County, in central Lithuania. According to the 2011 census, the village has a population of 30 people. It is located 3 km (1.9 mi) from Šlapaberžė, by the Žalčupys river and Sosiai forest.

== Demography ==
Historical population

Year	Pop.	±% p.a.
1902	198	—
1923	172	−0.67%
1959	114	−1.14%
1970	77	−3.50%

Year	Pop.	±% p.a.
1979	65	−1.86%
1989	44	−3.83%
2001	37	−1.43%
2011	30	−2.08%

Source: 1902, 1923, 1959 & 1970, 1979, 1989, 2001, 2011
