= Bokštai, Kėdainiai =

Bokštai
- Village
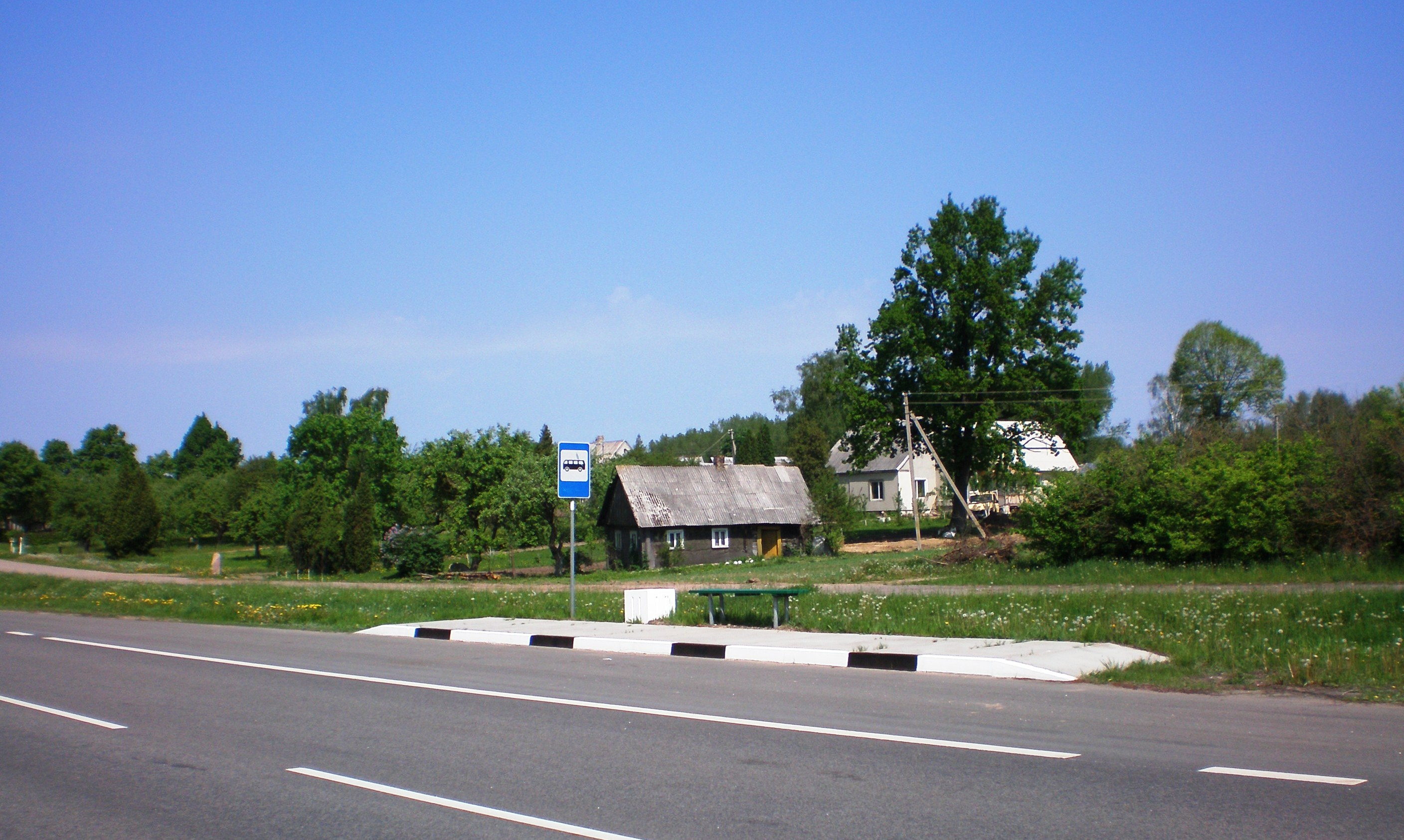

- Location in Lithuania Bokštai (Lithuania)
- Coordinates: 55°25′0″N 23°50′30″E
- Country: Lithuania
- County: Kaunas County
- Municipality: Kėdainiai district municipality
- Eldership: Dotnuva Eldership

Population (2011)
  - Total: 105
- Time zone: UTC+2 (EET)
  - Summer (DST): UTC+3 (EEST)

Bokštai is a village in Kėdainiai district municipality, in Kaunas County, in central Lithuania. According to the 2011 census, the village has a population of 105 people. The village is located by the Dotnuvėlė river (Akademija pond) and the regional road Jonava-Šeduva.

Formerly this location was known as Kemėšìškiai or Grigoriškiai.

== Demography ==
Historical population

Year	Pop.	±% p.a.
1923	325	—
1959	267	−0.54%
1970	286	+0.63%
1979	191	−4.39%

Year	Pop.	±% p.a.
1989	153	−2.19%
2001	120	−2.00%
2011	105	−1.33%

Source: 1902, 1923, 1959 & 1970, 1979, 1989, 2001, 2011
