= Sandzėnai =

- Village
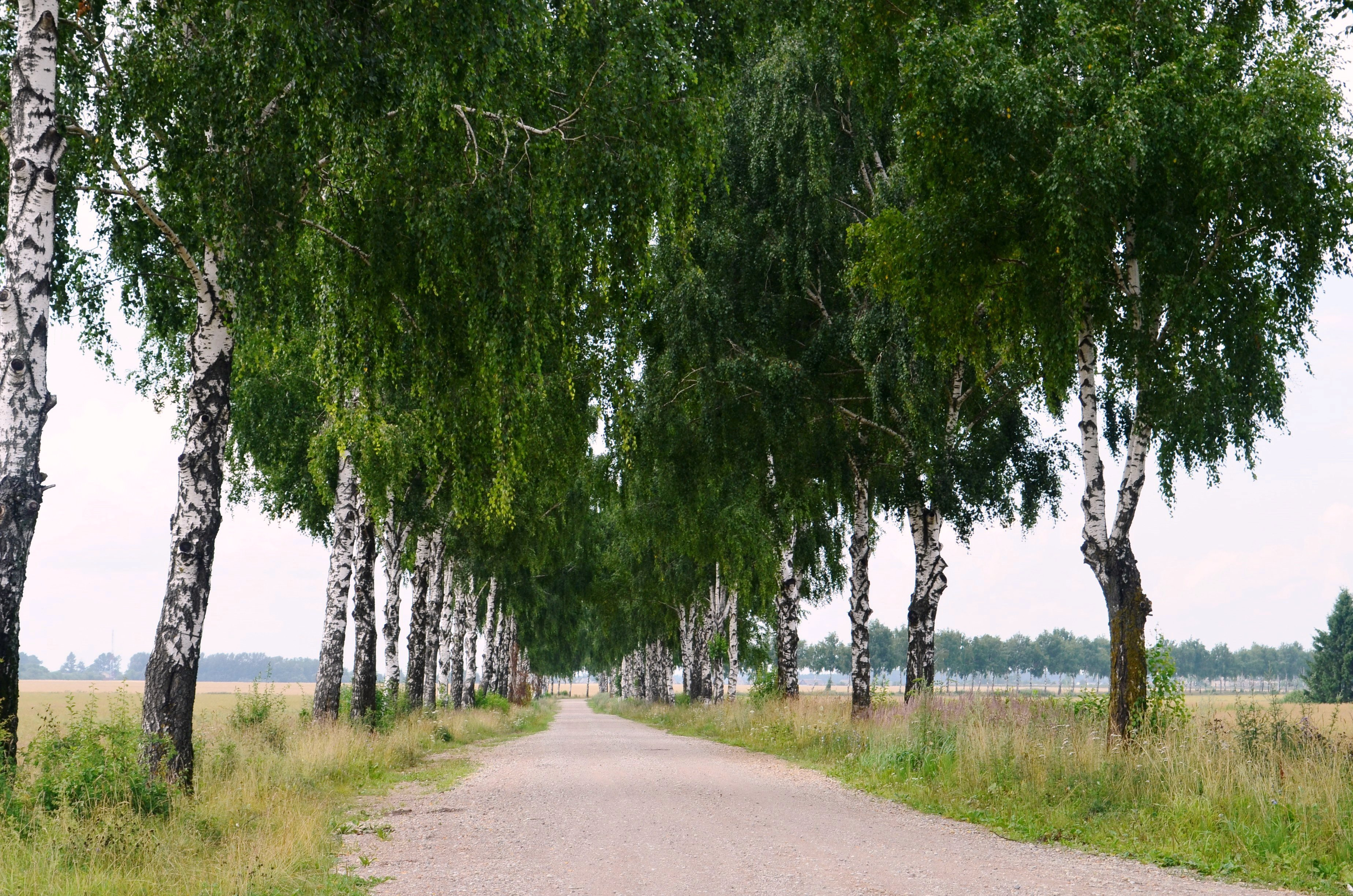

- Location in Lithuania
- Coordinates: 55°23′10″N 23°53′45″E
- Country: Lithuania
- County: Kaunas County
- Municipality: Kėdainiai district municipality
- Eldership: Dotnuva Eldership

Population (2011)
  - Total: 0
- Time zone: UTC+2 (EET)
  - Summer (DST): UTC+3 (EEST)

Sandzėnai (formerly Russian: Сендзяны) is a village in Kėdainiai district municipality, in Kaunas County, in central Lithuania. According to the 2011 census, the village has a population of 0 people. It is located 2 km (1.2 mi) from Dotnuva. The village was depopulated during Soviet era land improvement program (1979 census was the last with a population detected).

== Demography ==
Historical population

| Year | Pop. | ±% p.a. |
|---|---|---|
| 1902 | 22 | — |
| 1923 | 42 | +3.13% |
| 1959 | 69 | +1.39% |
| 1970 | 12 | −14.70% |

| Year | Pop. | ±% p.a. |
|---|---|---|
| 1979 | 2 | −18.05% |
| 1989 | 0 | −100.00% |
| 2001 | 0 | 0.00% |
| 2011 | 0 | 0.00% |

Source: 1902, 1923, 1959 & 1970, 1979, 1989, 2001, 2011
