= Zacišiai =

- Hamlet
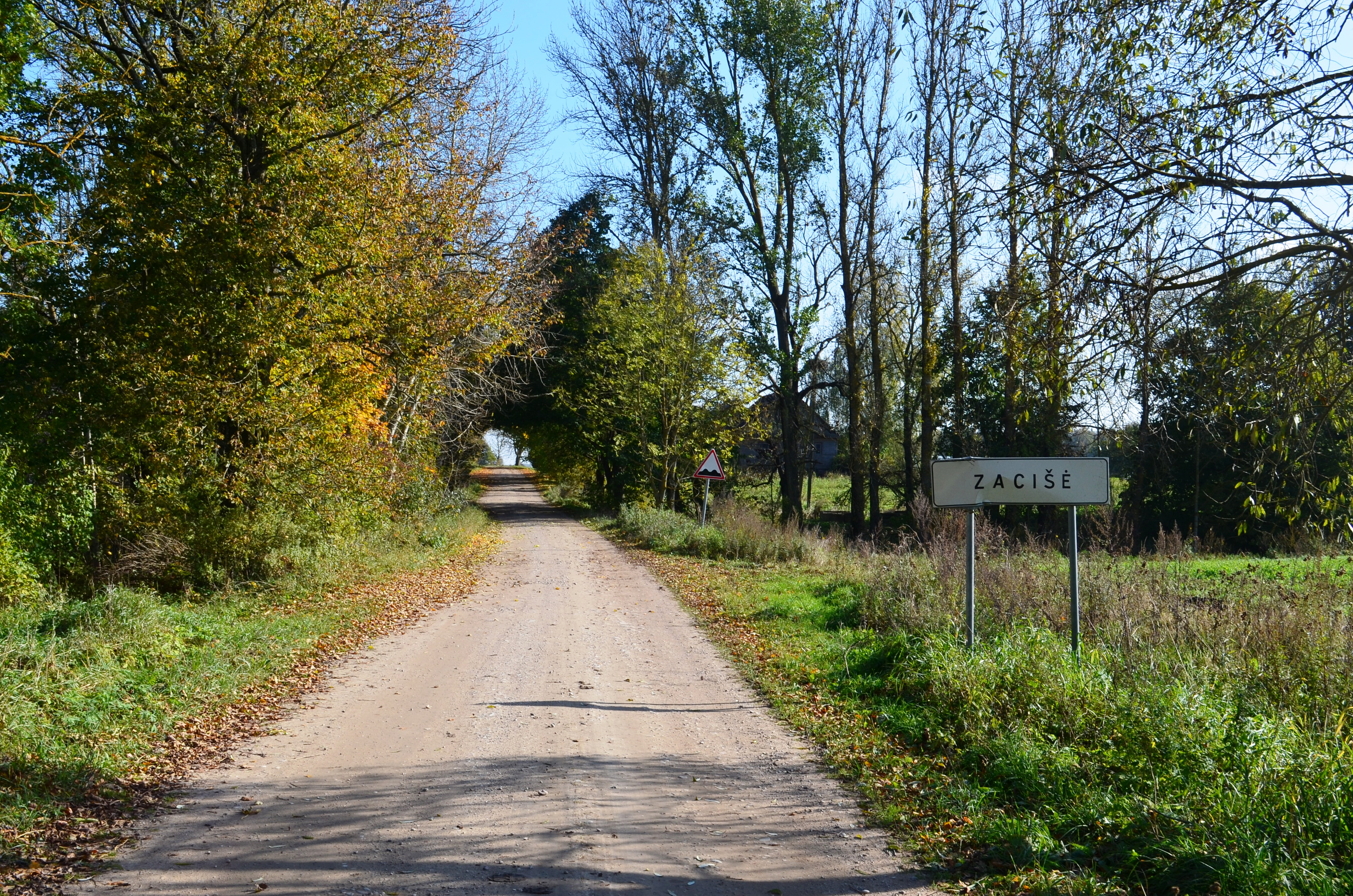

- Location in Lithuania
- Coordinates: 55°26′49″N 23°53′31″E
- Country: Lithuania
- County: Kaunas County
- Municipality: Kėdainiai district municipality
- Eldership: Dotnuva Eldership

Population (2011)
  - Total: 5
- Time zone: UTC+2 (EET)
  - Summer (DST): UTC+3 (EEST)

Zacišiai (or Zacišė, formerly Polish: Zacisze, Russian: Зацише) is a hamlet in Kėdainiai district municipality, in Kaunas County, in central Lithuania. According to the 2011 census, the hamlet has a population of 5 people. There was a manor before the Soviet era. Scenic birch tree alleys go along the roads to Zacišiai.

== Demography ==
Historical population

Year	Pop.	±% p.a.
1902	27	—
1923	8	−5.63%
1959	42	+4.71%
1970	47	+1.03%

Year	Pop.	±% p.a.
1979	22	−8.09%
1989	2	−21.32%
2001	6	+9.59%
2011	5	−1.81%

Source: 1902, 1923, 1959 & 1970, 1979, 1989, 2001, 2011
