= Ąžuolaičiai =

- Village
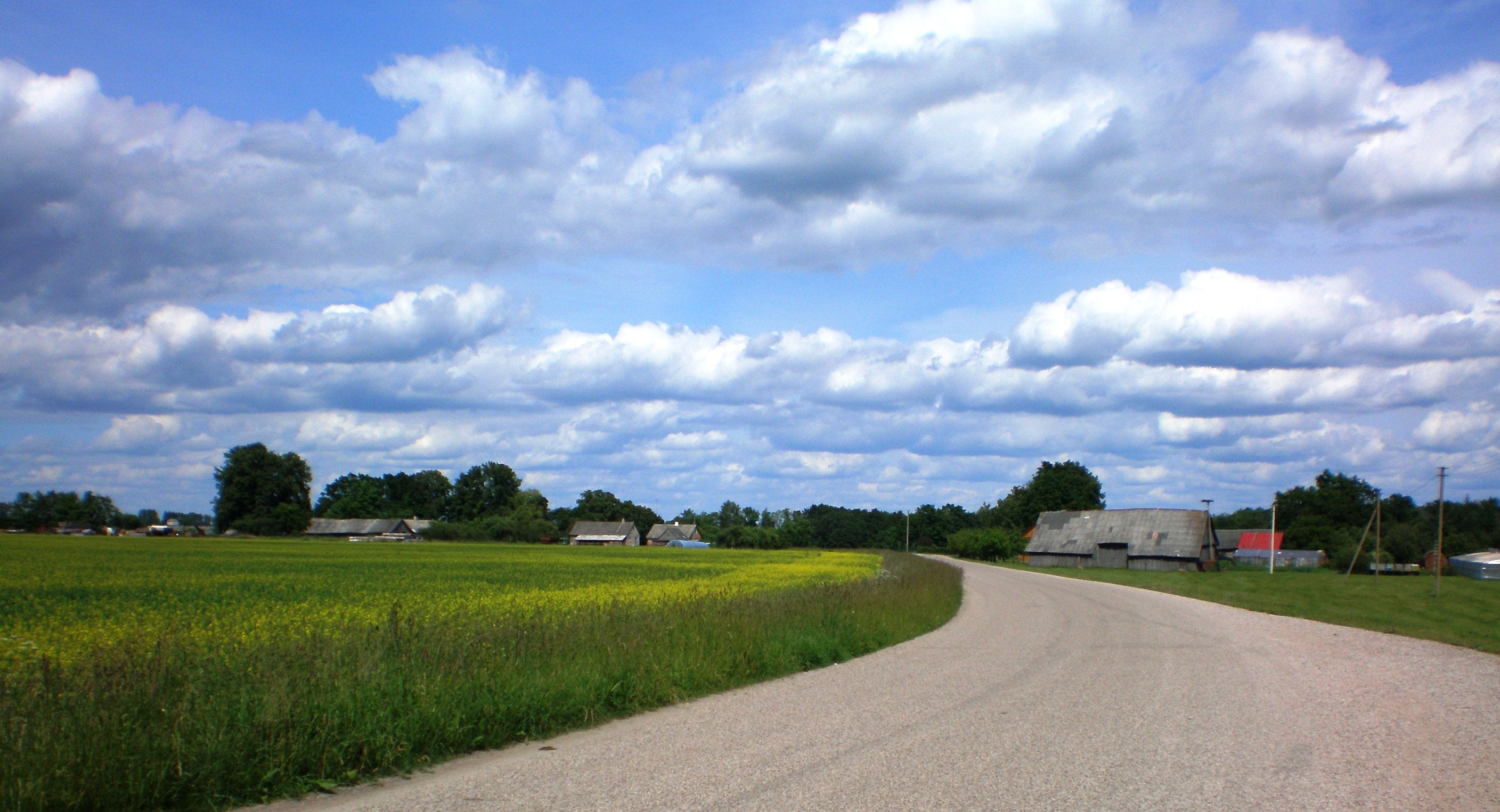

- Location in Lithuania Ąžuolaičiai (Lithuania)
- Coordinates: 55°20′40″N 23°51′10″E
- Country: Lithuania
- County: Kaunas County
- Municipality: Kėdainiai district municipality
- Eldership: Dotnuva Eldership

Population (2011)
  - Total: 137
- Time zone: UTC+2 (EET)
  - Summer (DST): UTC+3 (EEST)

Ąžuolaičiai is a village in the Kėdainiai district municipality, in Kaunas County, in central Lithuania. It is located by the Jaugila river, 3 km (1.9 mi) from Dotnuva. According to the 2011 census, the village has a population of 137 people.

== Demography ==
Historical population

Year	Pop.	±% p.a.
1923	75	—
1959	273	+3.65%
1970	233	−1.43%
1979	234	+0.05%

Year	Pop.	±% p.a.
1984	168	−6.41%
1989	182	+1.61%
2001	190	+0.36%
2011	137	−3.22%

Source: 1902, 1923, 1959 & 1970, 1979, 1989, 2001, 2011
