= Aušra, Kėdainiai =

Aušra
- Village
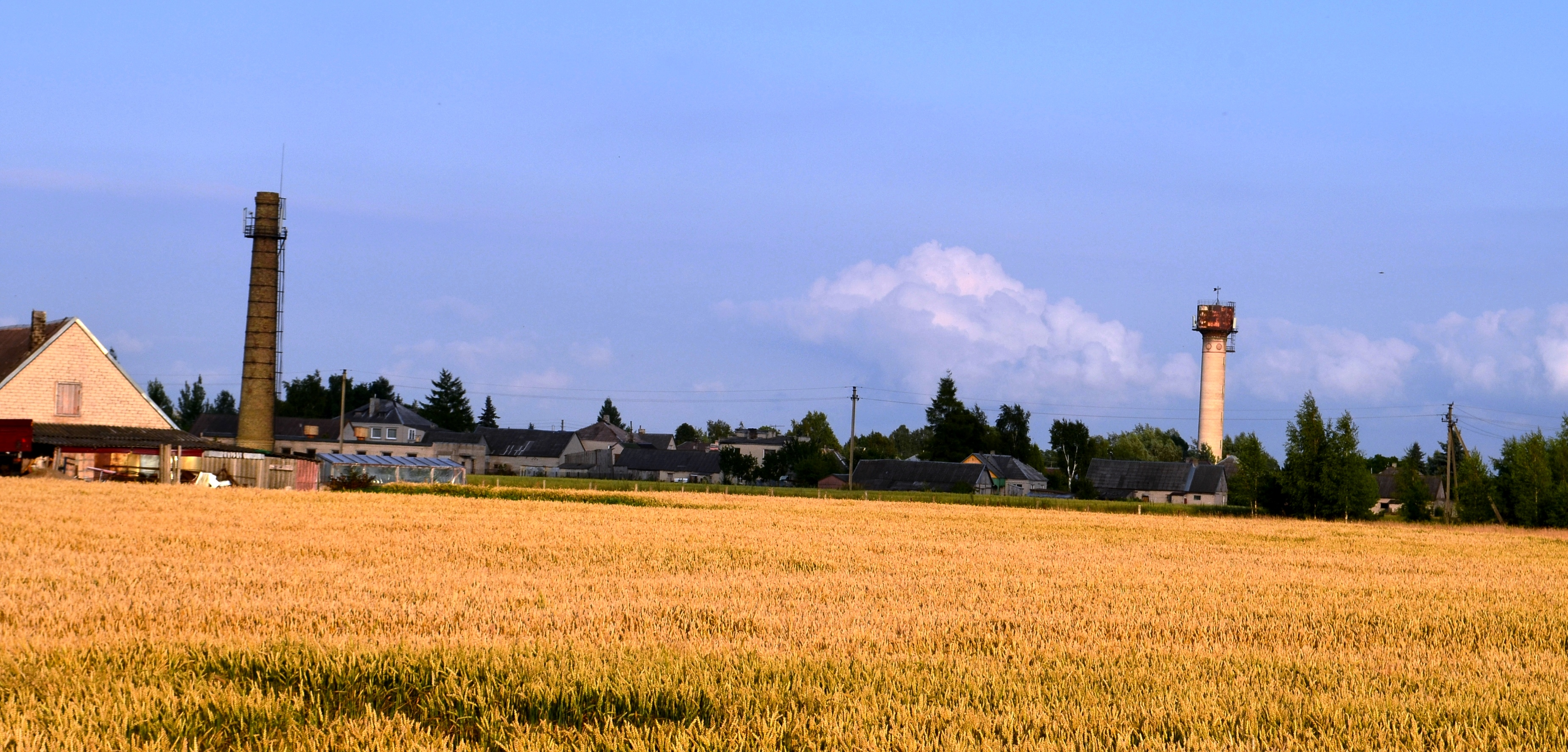

- Location in Lithuania
- Coordinates: 55°21′40″N 23°52′20″E
- Country: Lithuania
- County: Kaunas County
- Municipality: Kėdainiai
- Eldership: Dotnuva Eldership

Population (2021)
  - Total: 316
- Time zone: UTC+2 (EET)
  - Summer (DST): UTC+3 (EEST)

Aušra is a village in Kėdainiai district municipality, in Kaunas County, central Lithuania. It is a suburban locality of the Dotnuva town. According to the 2021 census, the village has a population of 316 people.

== Demography ==
Historical population

Year	Pop.	±% p.a.
1959	280	—
1970	211	−2.54%
1979	451	+8.81%
1984	517	+2.77%

Year	Pop.	±% p.a.
1989	466	−2.06%
2001	474	+0.14%
2011	406	−1.54%
2021	316	−2.47%

Source: 1902, 1923, 1959 & 1970, 1979, 1989, 2001, 2011 , 2021
