= Šiaudinė, Kėdainiai =

Šiaudinė
- Village
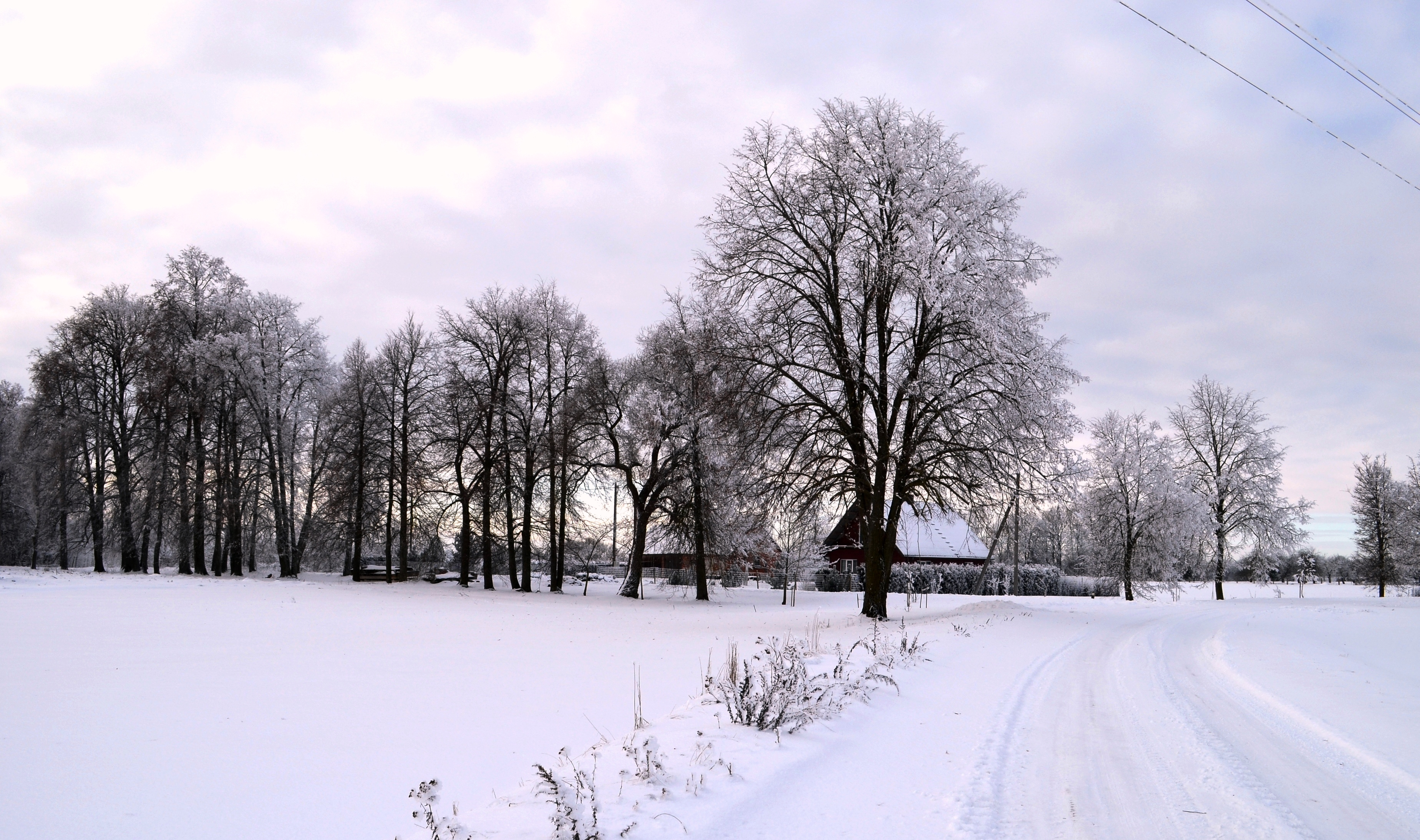

- Location in Lithuania
- Coordinates: 55°22′59″N 23°55′01″E
- Country: Lithuania
- County: Kaunas County
- Municipality: Kėdainiai district municipality
- Eldership: Dotnuva Eldership

Population (2011)
  - Total: 28
- Time zone: UTC+2 (EET)
  - Summer (DST): UTC+3 (EEST)

Šiaudinė is a village in Kėdainiai district municipality, in Kaunas County, in central Lithuania. According to the 2011 census, the village has a population of 28 people. It is located 2 km from Dotnuva by the Kruostas river.

== Demography ==
Historical population

Year	Pop.	±% p.a.
1959	117	—
1970	83	−3.07%
1979	44	−6.81%

Year	Pop.	±% p.a.
1989	24	−5.88%
2001	21	−1.11%
2011	28	+2.92%

Source: 1902, 1923, 1959 & 1970, 1979, 1989, 2001, 2011
