= Valučiai =

- Village
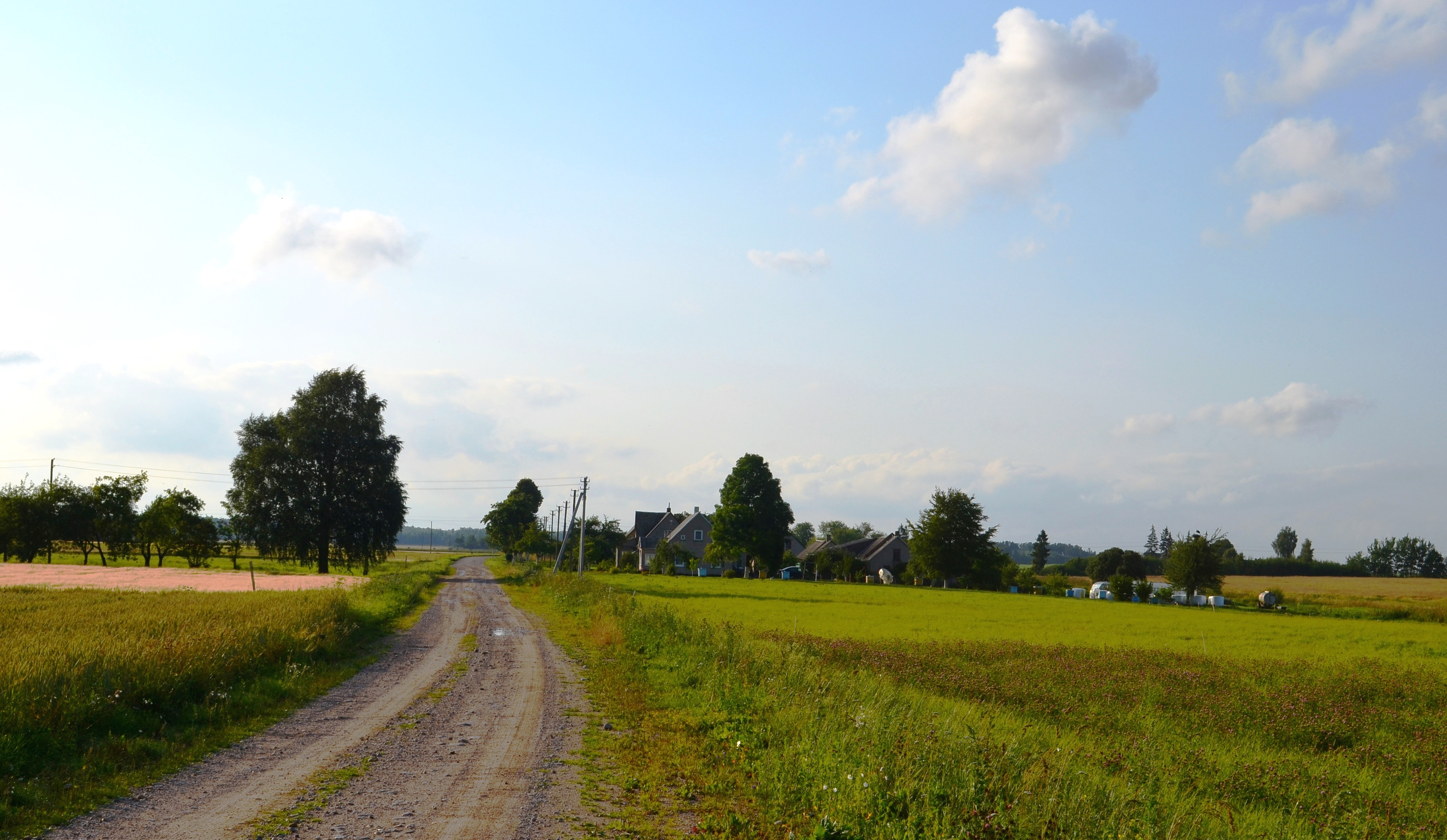

- Location in Lithuania
- Coordinates: 55°21′50″N 23°50′38″E
- Country: Lithuania
- County: Kaunas County
- Municipality: Kėdainiai district municipality
- Eldership: Dotnuva Eldership

Population (2011)
  - Total: 108
- Time zone: UTC+2 (EET)
  - Summer (DST): UTC+3 (EEST)

Valučiai (formerly Russian: Валуце) is a village in Kėdainiai district municipality, in Kaunas County, in central Lithuania. According to the 2011 census, the village has a population of 108 people. It is located 3 km from Dotnuva, by the Jaugila river and its tributary Girotakis.

== Demography ==
Historical population

| Year | Pop. | ±% p.a. |
|---|---|---|
| 1902 | 176 | — |
| 1923 | 208 | +0.80% |
| 1959 | 237 | +0.36% |
| 1970 | 229 | −0.31% |

| Year | Pop. | ±% p.a. |
|---|---|---|
| 1979 | 179 | −2.70% |
| 1989 | 145 | −2.08% |
| 2001 | 164 | +1.03% |
| 2011 | 108 | −4.09% |

Source: 1902, 1923, 1959 & 1970, 1979, 1989, 2001, 2011
