= Noreikiai, Kėdainiai =

Noreikiai
- Village
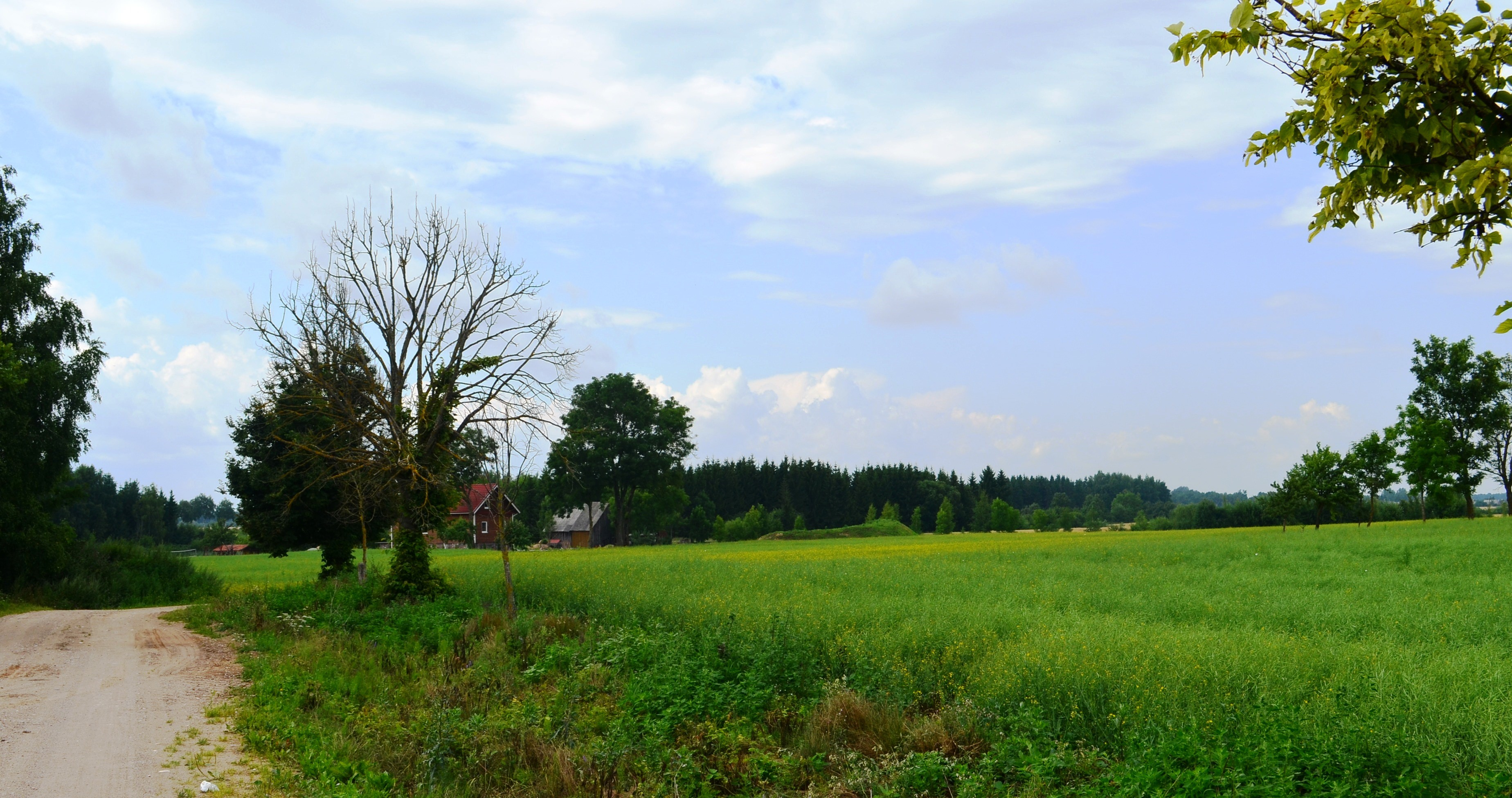

- Location in Lithuania
- Coordinates: 55°23′10″N 23°55′01″E
- Country: Lithuania
- County: Kaunas County
- Municipality: Kėdainiai district municipality
- Eldership: Dotnuva Eldership

Population (2011)
  - Total: 4
- Time zone: UTC+2 (EET)
  - Summer (DST): UTC+3 (EEST)

Noreikiai is a village in Kėdainiai district municipality, in Kaunas County, in central Lithuania. According to the 2011 census, the village has a population of 4 people. It is located 2 km (1.2 mi) from Dotnuva, by the Kruostas river (Vaidatoniai pond).

== Demography ==
Historical population

Year	Pop.	±% p.a.
1959	37	—
1970	25	−3.50%
1979	7	−13.19%

Year	Pop.	±% p.a.
1989	3	−8.12%
2001	4	+2.43%
2011	4	+0.00%

Source: 1902, 1923, 1959 & 1970, 1979, 1989, 2001, 2011
