= Pupėnai, Kėdainiai =

Pupėnai
- Hamlet
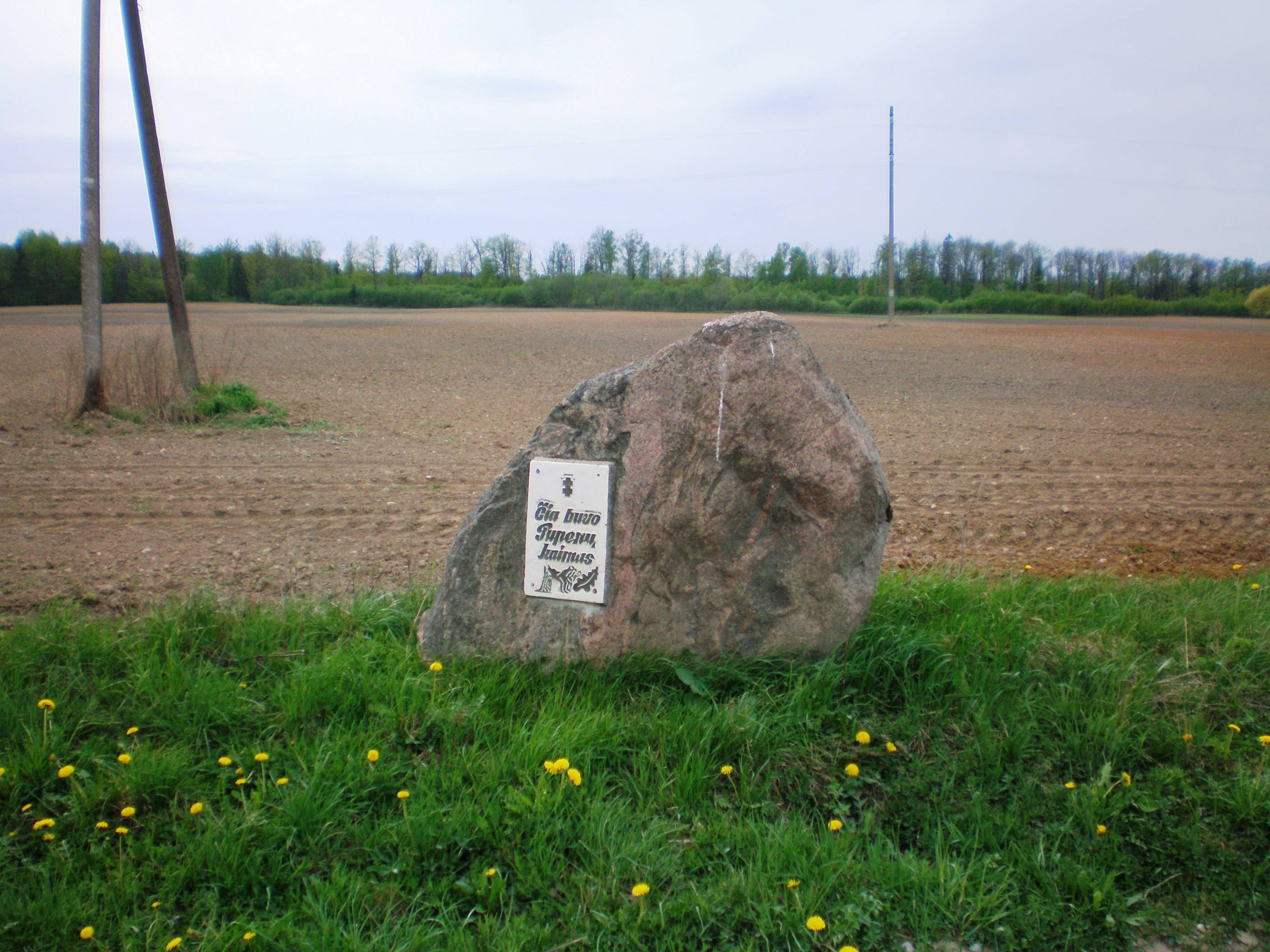

- Location in Lithuania Pupėnai (Lithuania)
- Coordinates: 55°28′41″N 23°44′38″E
- Country: Lithuania
- County: Kaunas County
- Municipality: Kėdainiai district municipality
- Eldership: Dotnuva Eldership

Population (2011)
  - Total: 0
- Time zone: UTC+2 (EET)
  - Summer (DST): UTC+3 (EEST)

Pupėnai is a hamlet in Kėdainiai district municipality, in Kaunas County, in central Lithuania. According to the 2011 census, the hamlet has a population of 0 people. It was depopulated during the Soviet era land development programs (the 1970 census was the last with population being detected).

== Demography ==
Historical population

Year	Pop.	±% p.a.
1959	60	—
1970	56	−0.63%
1979	0	−100.00%

Year	Pop.	±% p.a.
1989	0	0.00%
2001	0	0.00%
2011	0	0.00%

Source: 1902, 1923, 1959 & 1970, 1979, 1989, 2001, 2011
