= Ramėnai =

- Village
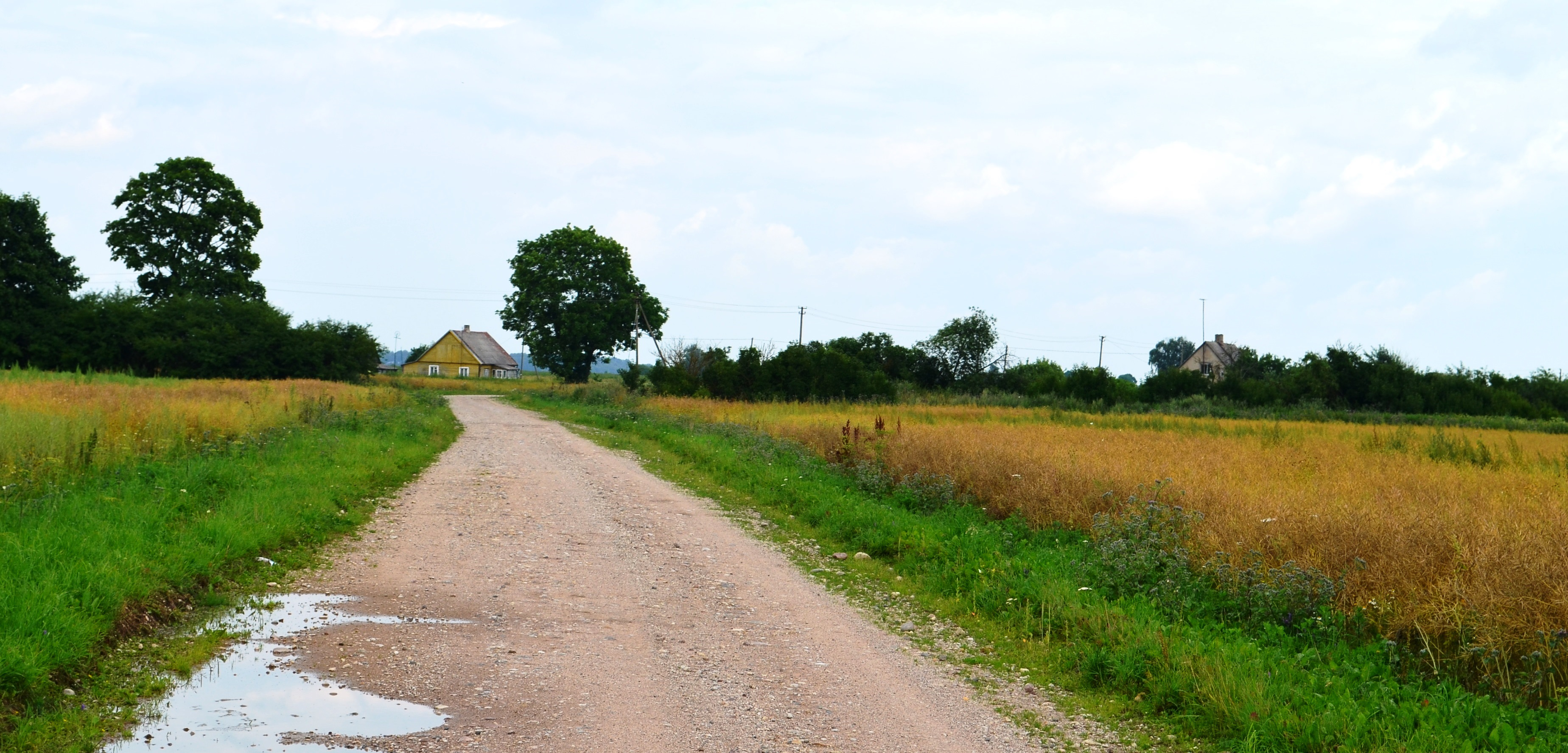

- Location in Lithuania
- Coordinates: 55°22′52″N 23°56′20″E
- Country: Lithuania
- County: Kaunas County
- Municipality: Kėdainiai district municipality
- Eldership: Dotnuva Eldership

Population (2011)
  - Total: 3
- Time zone: UTC+2 (EET)
  - Summer (DST): UTC+3 (EEST)

Ramėnai (formerly Russian: Румянка) is a village in Kėdainiai district municipality, in Kaunas County, in central Lithuania. According to the 2011 census, the village has a population of 3 people. It is located 1.5 km from Vaidatoniai, by the Alkas river.

== History ==
The village is known since 1372, when it was under the Teutonic Order ride. Since 1591 Ramėnai manor is mentioned.

== Demography ==
Historical population

Year	Pop.	±% p.a.
1923	210	—
1959	120	−1.54%
1970	80	−3.62%
1979	39	−7.67%

Year	Pop.	±% p.a.
1986	22	−7.85%
1989	19	−4.77%
2001	7	−7.98%
2011	3	−8.12%

Source: 1902, 1923, 1959 & 1970, 1979, 1989, 2001, 2011
