= Naujaberžė =

- Village
- Location in Lithuania
- Coordinates: 55°25′0″N 23°53′0″E
- Country: Lithuania
- County: Kaunas County
- Municipality: Kėdainiai district municipality
- Eldership: Dotnuva Eldership

Population (2011)
  - Total: 0
- Time zone: UTC+2 (EET)
  - Summer (DST): UTC+3 (EEST)

Naujaberžė is a village in Kėdainiai district municipality, in Kaunas County, in central Lithuania. According to the 2011 census, the village has a population of 0 people. The village was depopulated during Soviet land improvement program (1979 census was the last, when population in Naujaberžė was detected).

== Demography ==
Historical population

Year	Pop.	±% p.a.
1902	49	—
1923	53	+0.37%
1959	32	−1.39%
1970	23	−2.96%

Year	Pop.	±% p.a.
1979	3	−20.25%
1989	0	−100.00%
2001	0	0.00%
2011	0	0.00%

Source: 1902, 1923, 1959 & 1970, 1979, 1989, 2001, 2011
