= Bakšiai, Kėdainiai =

Bakšiai
- Hamlet
- Location in Lithuania
- Coordinates: 55°25′25″N 23°47′10″E
- Country: Lithuania
- County: Kaunas County
- Municipality: Kėdainiai district municipality
- Eldership: Dotnuva Eldership

Population (2011)
  - Total: 0
- Time zone: UTC+2 (EET)
  - Summer (DST): UTC+3 (EEST)

Bakšiai is a hamlet in Kėdainiai district municipality, in Kaunas County, in central Lithuania. According to the 2011 census, the hamlet has a population of 0 people. It was depopulated during the Soviet era land development programs (the 1979 census was the last with population being detected).

== Demography ==
Historical population

Year	Pop.	±% p.a.
1923	52	—
1959	86	+1.41%
1970	52	−4.47%
1979	14	−13.57%

Year	Pop.	±% p.a.
1989	0	−100.00%
2001	0	0.00%
2011	0	0.00%

Source: 1902, 1923, 1959 & 1970, 1979, 1989, 2001, 2011
