= Mantviliškis =

- Village
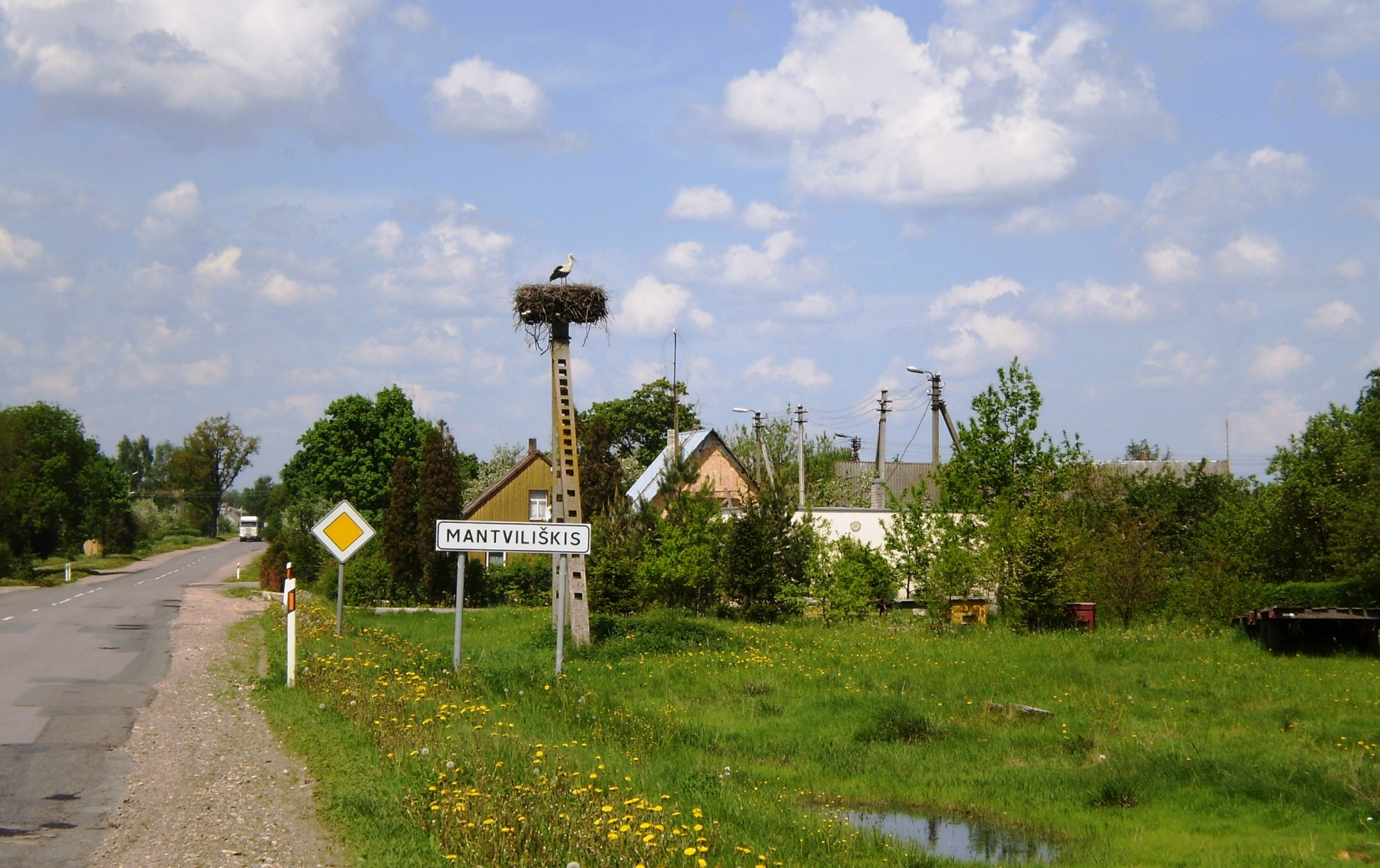

- Location in Lithuania
- Coordinates: 55°26′20″N 23°49′10″E
- Country: Lithuania
- County: Kaunas County
- Municipality: Kėdainiai district municipality
- Eldership: Dotnuva Eldership

Population (2011)
  - Total: 205
- Time zone: UTC+2 (EET)
  - Summer (DST): UTC+3 (EEST)

Mantviliškis is a village in Kėdainiai district municipality, in Kaunas County, in central Lithuania. It is located by the Dotnuvėlė river and Mantviliškis pond, 7 km (4.3 mi) from Dotnuva. According to the 2011 census, the village has a population of 205 people.

== Demography ==
Historical population

Year	Pop.	±% p.a.
1820	244	—
1902	341	+0.41%
1923	275	−1.02%
1959	290	+0.15%

Year	Pop.	±% p.a.
1970	337	+1.37%
1979	321	−0.54%
1986	283	−1.78%
1989	283	+0.00%

Year	Pop.	±% p.a.
2001	269	−0.42%
2011	205	−2.68%

Source: 1902, 1923, 1959 & 1970, 1979, 1989, 2001, 2011
