= Šlapaberžė =

- Village
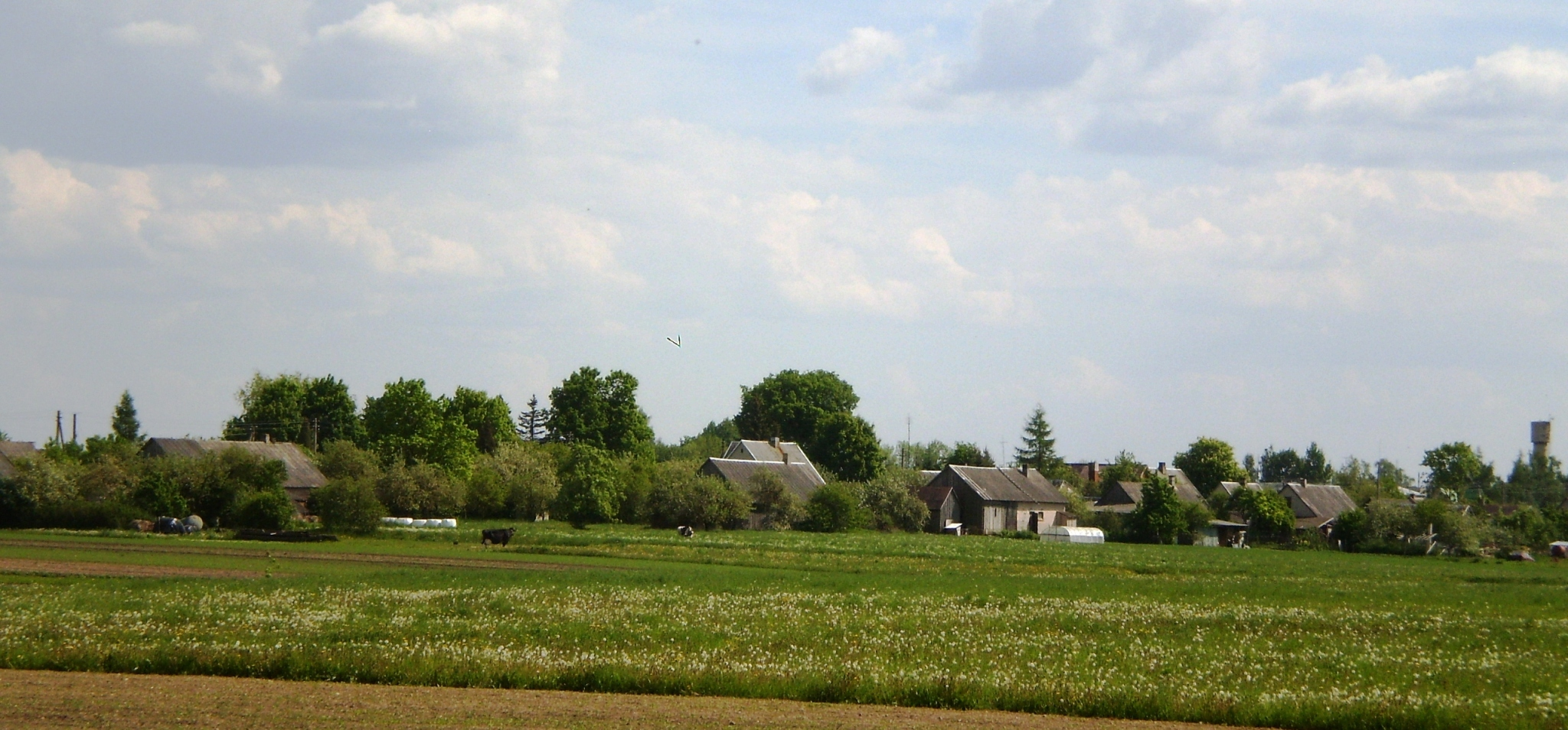

- Location in Lithuania Šlapaberžė (Lithuania)
- Coordinates: 55°25′20″N 23°55′20″E
- Country: Lithuania
- County: Kaunas County
- Municipality: Kėdainiai district municipality
- Eldership: Dotnuva Eldership

Population (2011)
  - Total: 616
- Time zone: UTC+2 (EET)
  - Summer (DST): UTC+3 (EEST)

Šlapaberžė (formerly Polish: Szłapoburże, Szłapoberże, Szłapoberż, Szłapobierże, Ludwików, Russian: Шлапоберже) is a village in Kėdainiai district municipality, in Kaunas County, in central Lithuania. According to the 2011 census, the village has a population of 616 people. The village is located by the Kruostas river, 7 km from Akademija. The village has the Catholic Church of Christ, a former manor with a park, and a wayside chapel.

== History ==
Šlapaberžė was mentioned for the first time in 1371, when it came under the Teutonic Order ride. At the 18th century it was a royal village.

During the Soviet era, Šlapaberžė was a kolkhoz and selsovet center. There was an agriculture school.

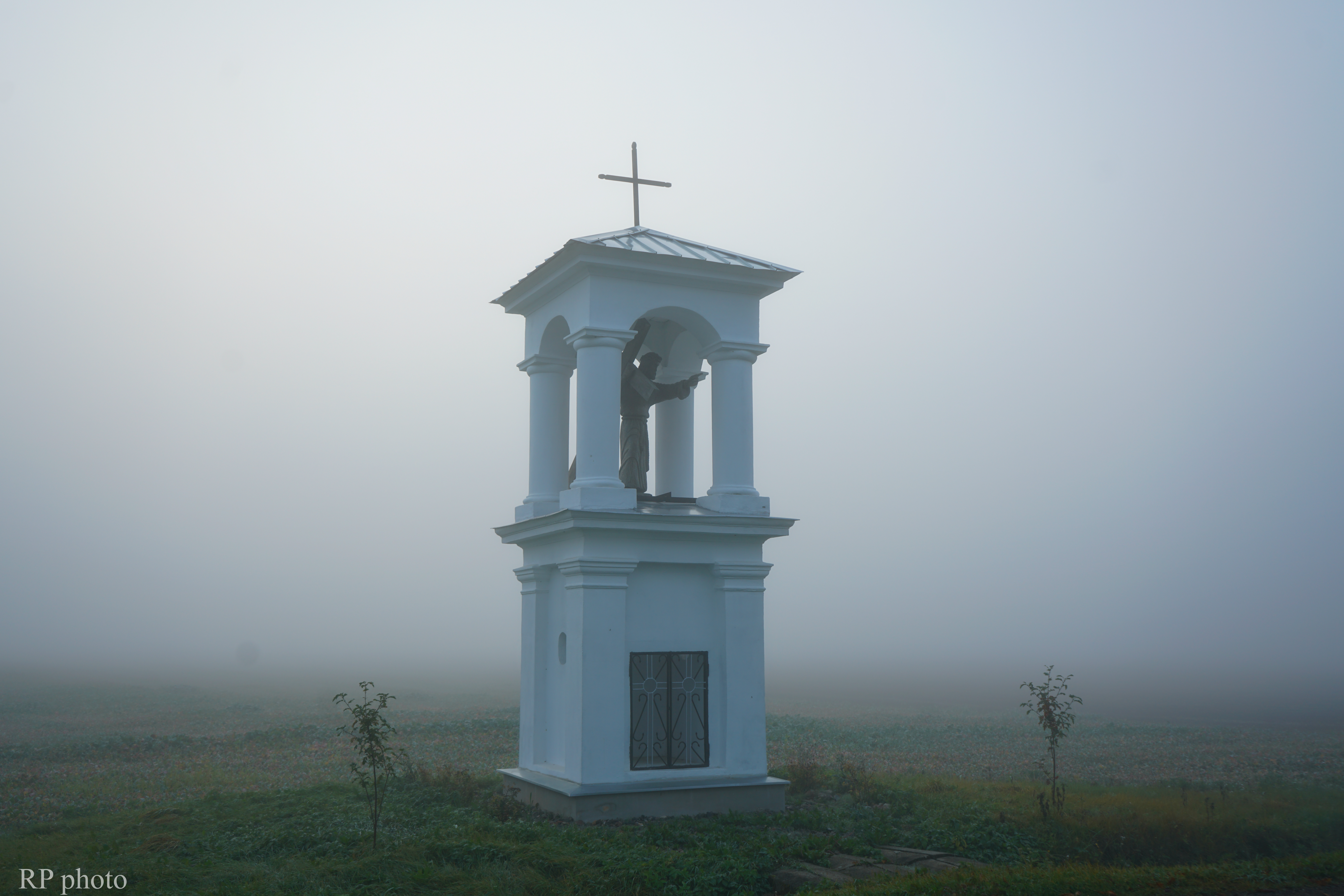
Šlapaberžė chapel

== Demography ==
Historical population

Year	Pop.	±% p.a.
1820	301	—
1886	154	−1.01%
1902	397	+6.10%
1923	363	−0.43%

Year	Pop.	±% p.a.
1959	743	+2.01%
1970	918	+1.94%
1979	1,089	+1.92%
1987	1,415	+3.33%

Year	Pop.	±% p.a.
1989	1,040	−14.27%
2001	583	−4.71%
2011	616	+0.55%

Source: 1902, 1923, 1959 & 1970, 1979, 1989, 2001, 2011
