= Dotnuvėlė =

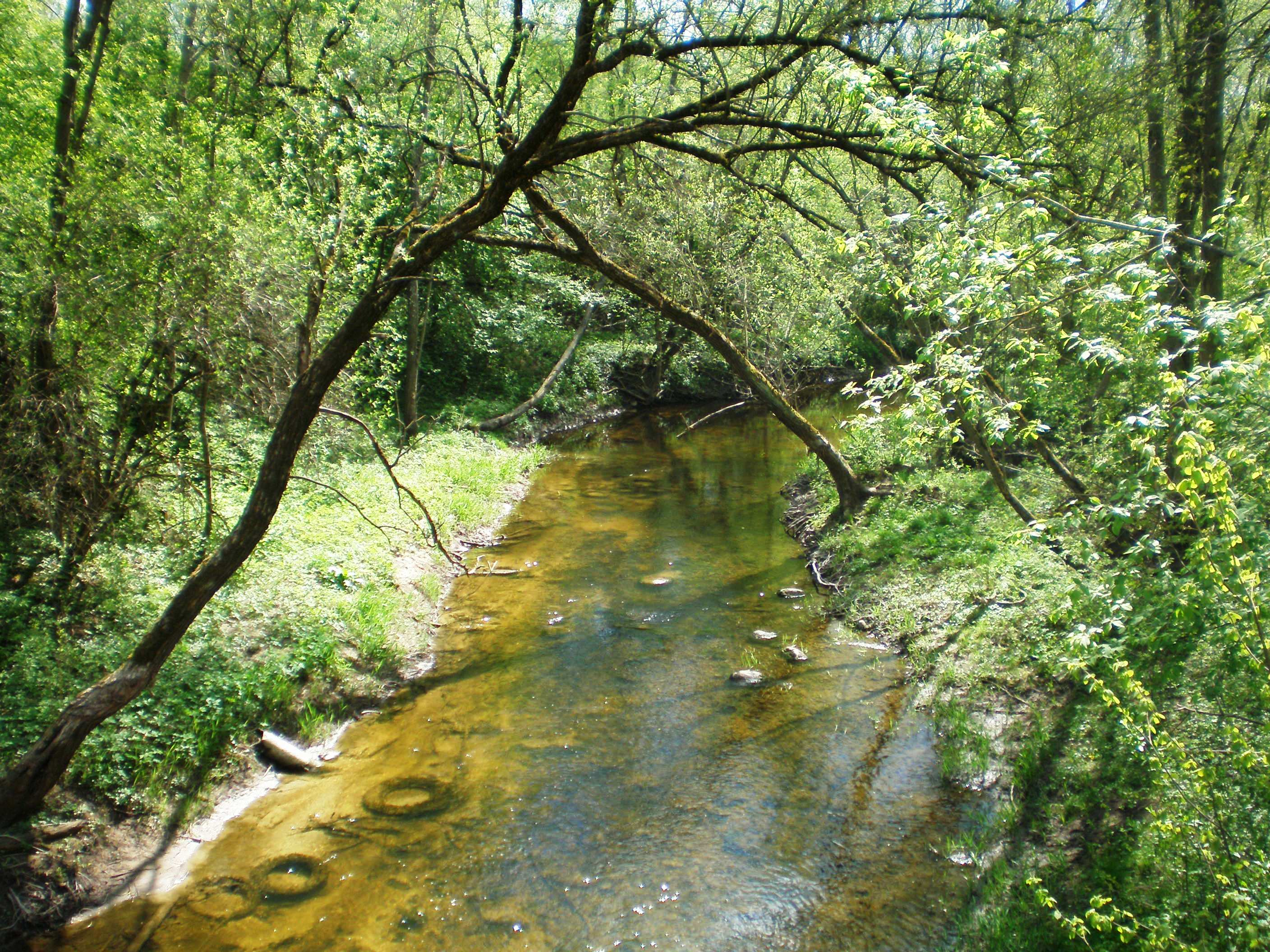
- Dotnuvėlė in Babėnai

- Location within Lithuania

Location
- Country: Lithuania
- Location: Radviliškis district municipality, Kėdainiai district municipality

Physical characteristics
- Source
  - location: Near Baisogala
  - coordinates: 55.6251°N 23.7537°E
- Mouth: Nevėžis in Kėdainiai
  - coordinates: 55.2942°N 23.9905°E
- Length: 60.9 kilometres (37.8 mi)
- Basin size: 192.7 km^{2} (74.4 sq mi)
- Discharge
  - average: 0.8 m^{3}/s

Basin features
- Progression: Nevėžis→ Neman→ Baltic Sea
- Tributaries
  - left: Stabė, Trasinė
  - right: Rimšupys, Virgupis, Srautas, Lielupys, Kačupys

The Dotnuvėlė is a river of Kėdainiai district municipality and Radviliškis district municipality, Kaunas County, central Lithuania. It flows for 60.9 kilometres and has a basin area of 192.7 km^{2}.

Its valley is 350–500 m wide. The current rate is 0.2-0.9 meters per second. The Dotnuvelė course goes through Skėmiai, Gudžiūnai, Mantviliškis, Akademija, Dotnuva. It is a right tributary of the Nevėžis river, into which it flows in Kėdainiai.

The name Dotnuvėlė (formerly Dotnava) could derive from the PIE root *dā- ('liquid, to flow') as Sanskrit: dānu ('liquid, drop'), Iron Ossetic: дон ('river'), Avar: dā-nu- ('river, current'), etc.
