= Akademija, Kėdainiai =

Akademija
- Town
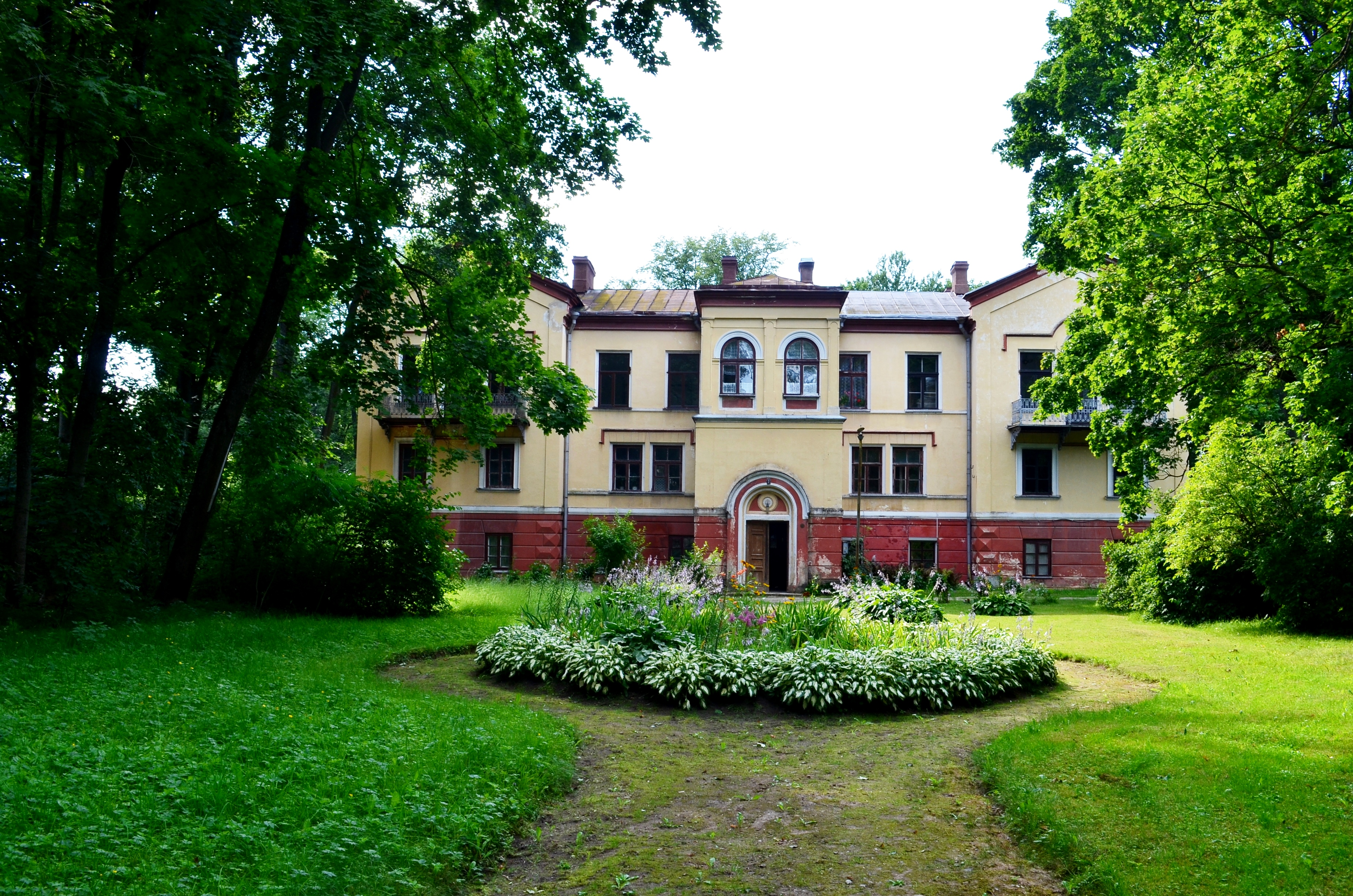

- Location in Lithuania Akademija (Lithuania)
- Coordinates: 55°23′50″N 23°51′40″E
- Country: Lithuania
- County: Kaunas County
- Municipality: Kėdainiai district municipality
- Eldership: Dotnuva Eldership

Population (2011)
  - Total: 752
- Time zone: UTC+2 (EET)
  - Summer (DST): UTC+3 (EEST)

Akademija is a town in the Kėdainiai district municipality, in Kaunas County, central Lithuania. It lies on the left bank of the Dotnuvėlė river. According to the 2011 census, the village had a population of 752. The Lithuanian Research Centre for Agriculture and Forestry is located here. In 2018, the centre employed 545 people, including 187 researchers, and had 56 doctoral students. In Akademija, there is a Dotnuva manor and a large park.

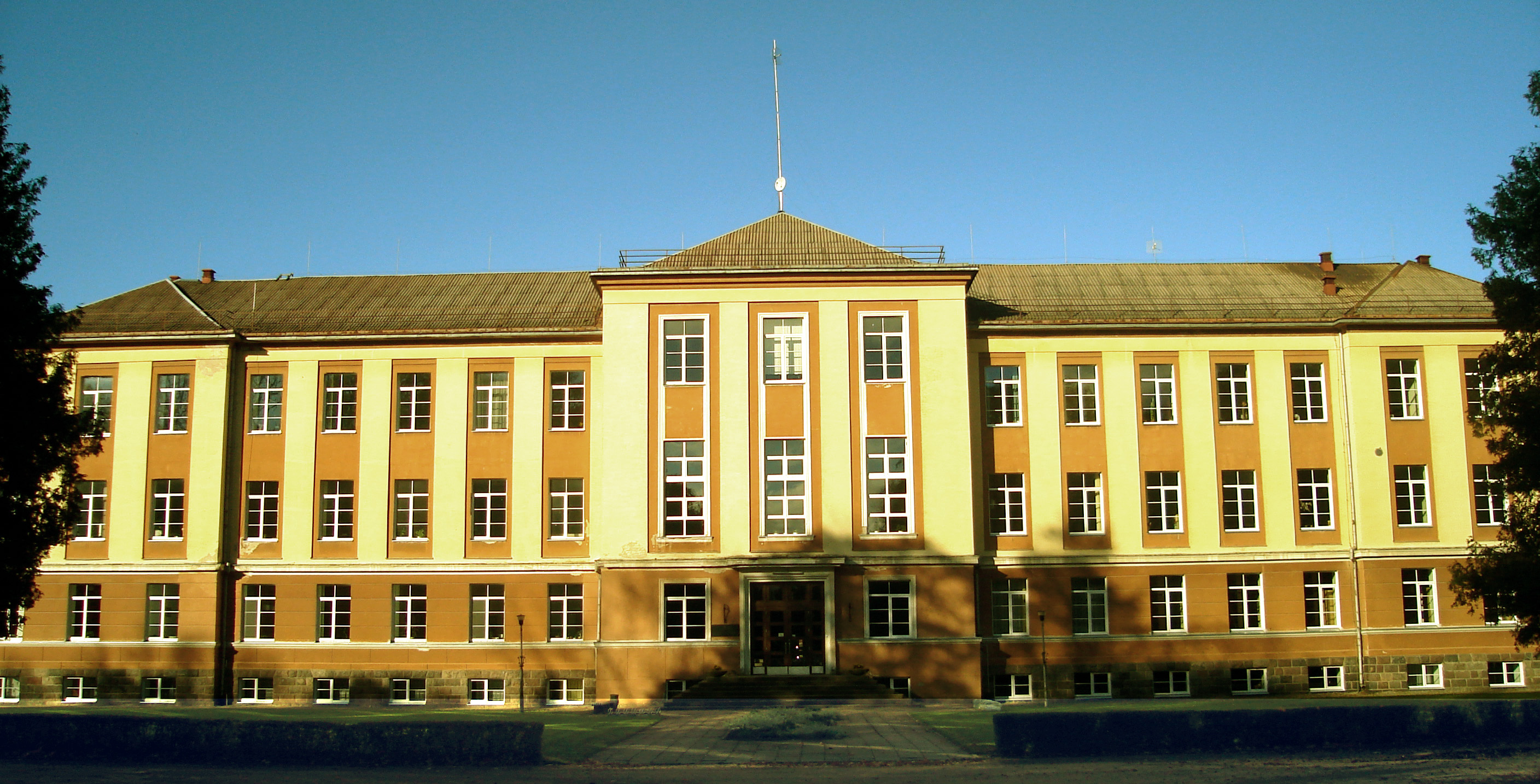
Lithuanian Research Centre for Agriculture and Forestry in Akademija

== History ==
A school dedicated to agriculture and forestry was opened on the estate of Pyotr Stolypin in 1919. In 1922, the first plant breeding station in Lithuania was established by Dionizas Rudzinskas. In 1923, a field trial station was also set up. An agriculture academy operated here from 1924 to 1945. In 1944, the academy's main hall was exploded by the German forces, and as a result, in 1946, the academy was moved to Kaunas. In 1956 the Lithuanian agriculture institute was moved here from Vilnius and in 2010 it was renamed to The Lithuanian Research Centre for Agriculture and Forestry.

== Demography ==
Historical population

Year	Pop.	±% p.a.
1923	715	—
1959	841	+0.45%
1970	919	+0.81%
1979	1,112	+2.14%

Year	Pop.	±% p.a.
1984	1,101	−0.20%
1989	988	−2.14%
2001	873	−1.03%
2011	752	−1.48%

Source: 1902, 1923, 1959 & 1970, 1979, 1989, 2001, 2011
