= Telephone numbers in East Germany =

- Country: East Germany
- Continent: Europe
- Numbering plan type: open
- NSN length: 8
- Format: xxx-xx xxxx xxxx-xxxxx xxxxx-xxxx xxxxxx-xxx
- Country code: 37 (retired)
- International access: 06
- Long-distance: 0

Upon the division of Germany after World War II into West Germany and East Germany, telephone numbers in East Germany were administered independently from the telephone network in the west, despite their common telecommunication history.

East Germany was assigned telephone country code 37 by the International Telecommunication Union (ITU) by bilateral agreements in ITU Notification 980 of 10 March 1966.

Telephone calls between East and West Germany required international dialling with the international call routing prefix 00 and country code for calls from West Germany to East Germany, and 06 49 from East Germany to West Germany.

== Canonical numbers and local shortcuts ==
The East German telephone network did not only consist of a strictly hierarchic star topology, but had additional links connecting (usually neighbor) areas directly (similar to the UK). Thus, each area had one "canonical" prefix (00x... or 09x..., with x denoting the district, e.g. 005... for Saxony) involving the central offices and a number of shortcut prefixes 02... through 05... bypassing those and reducing toll charges. For example, Zwickau had the canonical prefix 0074 (37-74), but had different "shortcut" prefixes" from other areas, valid only in those - e.g. 036 from East Berlin. These "shortcuts" were not ported to the West German numbering plan.

== Berlin ==
Because both parts of the divided Germany did not consider any location in Berlin a part of a "foreign country", both parts of the city had special prefixes for each other: West Berliners could call East Berliners (from East German 002-... or +37-2-...) with the prefix 0372 (just like another city/area, instead of 00-37-2). Similarly East Berliners could call West Berliners using the prefix 8-49, as if they were calling a local number.

Dialing pattern: 2-xxx xxxx

== Integration into the West German telephone network ==
On 15 April 1992, area codes were integrated into the West German numbering plan, with permissive dialing in effect for the old codes including the old country code until 1 June 1992. East Berlin had already been reassigned with 030 (the former West Berlin) area code. All area codes (except Berlin's) had the second digit (0 or 9) into the "canonical" code replaced by 3 (e.g. Erfurt's former 0061 (globally +37-61) area code became 0-361 or globally +49-361). In places, the code was changed entirely.

== Retirement of country code 37 ==
After the reunification of West and East Germany, country code 37 was retired. This permitted the ITU to open a new numbering block, 37x, for country codes. Following the dissolution of the Soviet Union, some countries that previously used the code 7 adopted a prefix from the new block, e.g., Lithuania adopted the code 370. This included some European microstates that had previously used a network of a surrounding country. For example, Monaco adopted 377, replacing 33 (France).

== See also ==
- Telephone numbers in Germany
