= Kėdainiai minaret =

Minaret in Kėdainiai, Lithuania

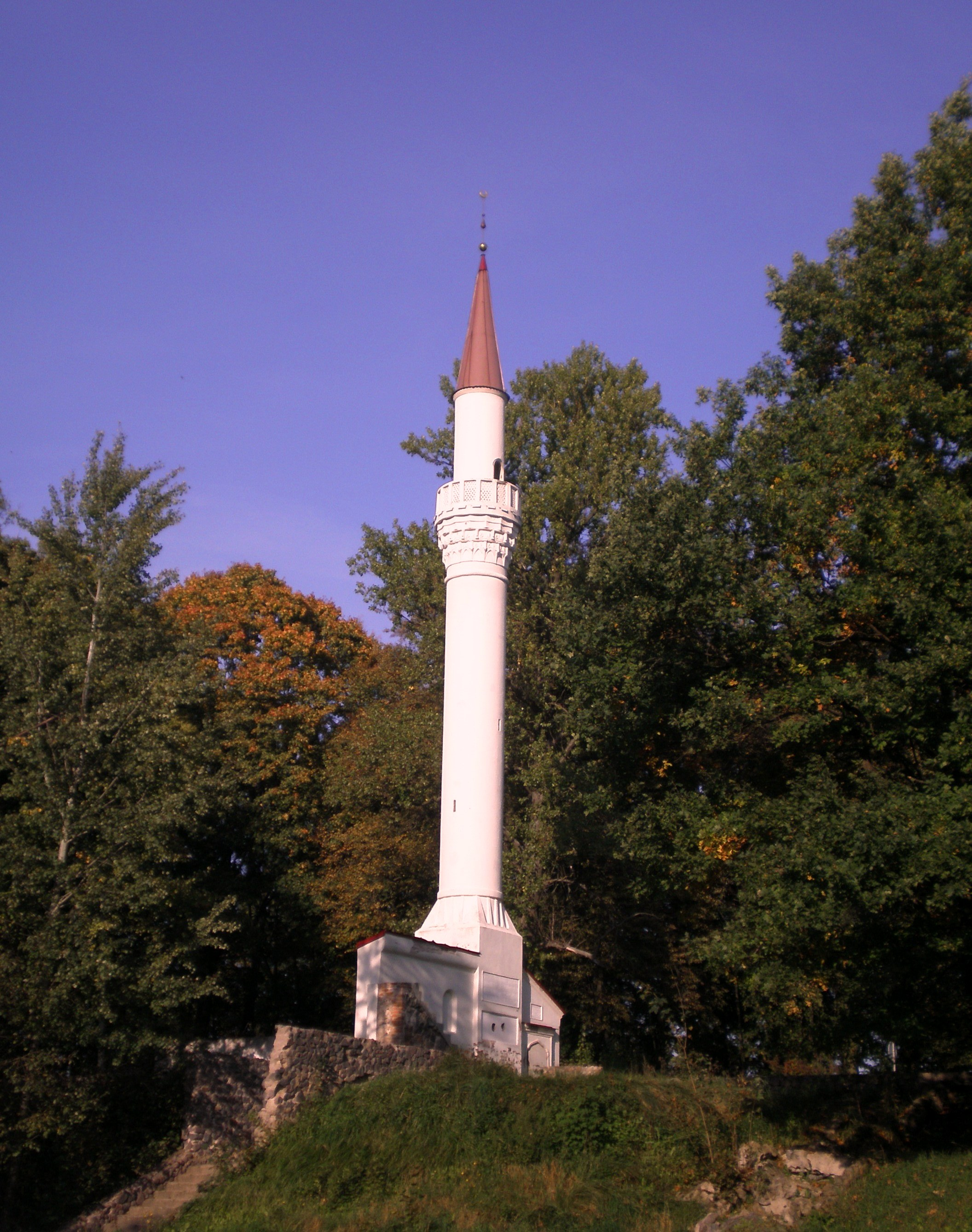

- Location within Lithuania

Religion
- Affiliation: Islam

Location
- Location: Kėdainiai, Lithuania
- Municipality: Kėdainiai district municipality
- Coordinates: 55.1729°N 23.5835°E

Architecture
- Type: Minaret
- Style: Ottoman
- Completed: 1880
- Height (max): 25 m (82 ft)

The Kėdainiai minaret is the only free-standing minaret in Lithuania. It is located in the city of Kėdainiai, in the city park, between the Kėdainiai train station and the Dotnuvėlė River.

== History ==
The minaret was erected in 1880 by a Russian general, Eduard Totleben, who was the owner of an estate in Kėdainiai. It was built to commemorate his service in the Russian-Turkish war, in which he had participated. Local legend claims that it was constructed in memory of his Turkish lover.

== Architecture ==
The minaret is typical of Ottoman architecture. It is needle-topped, 25 meters high and has a balcony which can be reached by interior stairs. There are two plaques affixed to its wall. One is written in Ottoman Turkish and describes a beautiful palace built by the Ottoman sultan. The second plaque bears an Arabic inscription from the Koran, sura Al-Baqara, verse 255 āyatu-l-kursī which says "Who is it that can intercede with Him (God) except by His (God's) permission" ?

The minaret is a local architectural monument.

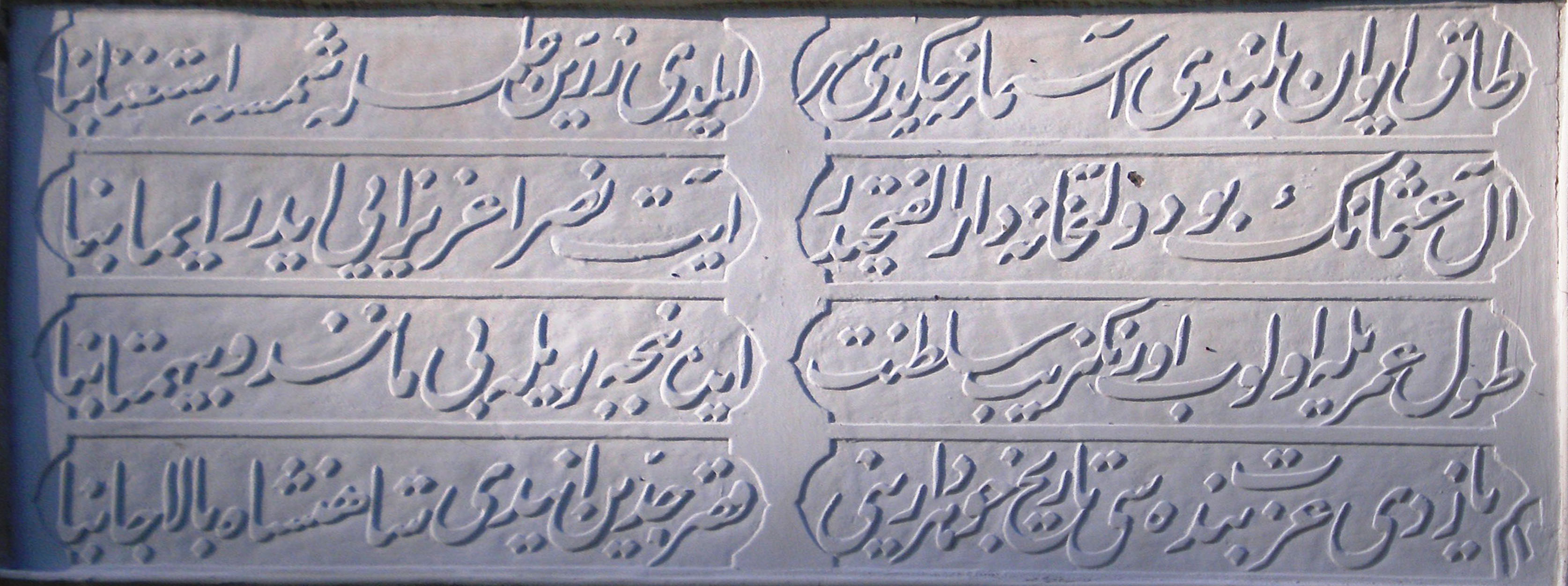
Ottoman inscription
