= Panevėžio autobusų parkas =

Passenger transport services and bus services in the city

UAB Panevėžio autobusų parkas provides passenger transport services and bus services in the city, suburbs and long-distance routes. The company serves the public transport system in Panevėžys.

== History ==
Panevėžio autobusų parkas was founded in 1958, as a motor carrier with 59 buses, 10 passenger and 4 freight cars. In 1995 this company was registered as a closed joint-stock company.

== Public transport in Panevėžys ==
=== Routes ===
UAB Panevėžio autobusų parkas is serving 15 Panevėžys city routes with 44 buses running. Total urban route network consists of 136,8 kilometers. There are 223 passenger bus stops.

No.	Route	Notes
1	Aguonų str. - Kniaudiškių str. - Savitiškio str.	Workdays only
3	Aguonų str. - Projektuotojų str. - Savitiškio str.	
4	Molainiai - Vaivadai	
5	Parko str. - Venslaviškiai	Workdays only
6	Pajuostis - J. Janionio str.	on weekends/holidays Pajuostis - Įmonių str.
7	Velžys road - AB "Gilėnai"	on weekends/holidays Velžys road - AB "Panevėžio stiklas"
8	Taikos al. - Rožių str.	
10	S.Dariaus ir S.Girėno str. – Tinklų str.	
11	Velžys road – Car service and technical examination centre	Workdays only
13	Velžys road – "Babilonas"	
14	Savitiškio str. - Tinklų str.	Workdays only
15	S.Dariaus ir S.Girėno str. - Piniava	
16	Wholesale base - Molainių str.	

City bus schedules in English

=== Ticket Prices ===
In Panevėžys, as well as in Klaipėda or Kėdainiai, passengers are picked up only through the front door.

	in Kiosk	in Bus
50% discount	0,75 Lt	0,90 Lt
Full price	1,50 Lt	1, 80 Lt
80% discount	0,30 Lt	0,36 Lt
Ticket for whole month	80,00 Lt	
Ticket for month (work days only)	56,00 Lt	
Ticket for month with 50% discount	40,00 Lt	
Ticket for month with 80% discount	16,00 Lt	
Ticket for half of month full price	28,00 Lt	
Ticket for half of month with 50% discount	20,00 Lt	
