= 03 numbers =

03 numbers may refer to:

- Non-geographic telephone numbers in the United Kingdom charged at geographic rates
- Telephone area codes in the eastern part of Germany; see telephone numbers in Germany
