= Kėdainiai Atžalynas Gymnasium =

- Kėdainių Atžalyno gimnazija
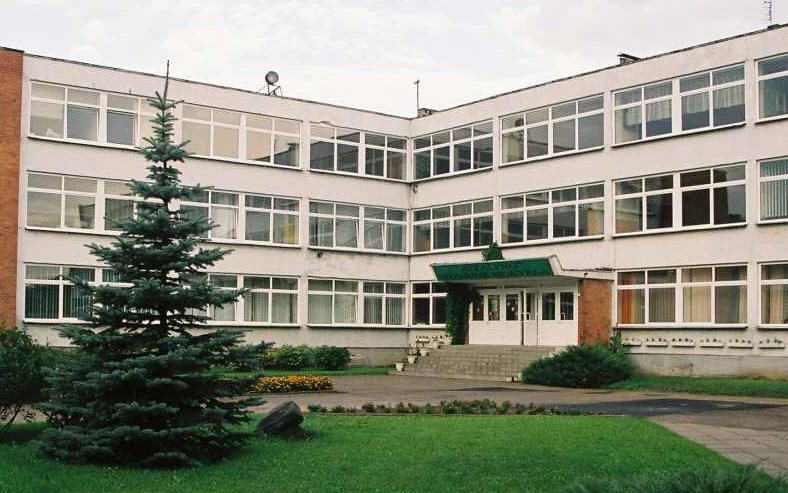

Location
- Mindaugo g. 18; Kėdainiai, 57438; Lithuania
- Coordinates: 55°16′53″N 23°57′26″E

Information
- Former name: Kėdainiai Atžalynas Secondary School; Kėdainiai 2nd Secondary School
- School type: Public, Gymnasium
- Established: 1944
- Founder: Kėdainiai District Municipality Council
- Director: Gintaras Petrulis
- Staff: 87 (Jan 2018)
- Teaching staff: 72 (2015)
- Average class size: 26 (2015)
- Campus type: Urban
- Website: www.atzalynas.kedainiai.lm.lt

Kėdainiai Atžalynas Gymnasium is a high school in Kėdainiai, Lithuania, established in 1944.

== History ==
The school was established in 1944 as a girls' gymnasium based in the old town of Kėdainiai, which later, in 1950, was named Kėdainiai 2nd Secondary School. From 1953 to 1974, the school was housed in the building of the now former Jonusas Radvila Study Centre. Eventually, it was moved to its current location to a purpose-built building in the new part of the city.

In 1993 it was given a name of Atžalynas, which roughly translates as "offspring". On 1 March 2010, the school received a status of gymnasium and is now called Kėdainiai Atžalynas gymnasium.
