= Telephone numbers in Lithuania =

- Country: Lithuania
- Continent: Europe
- NSN length: 8
- Format: (0 x) xxx xxxx (0 xx) xx xxxx (0 xxx) xxxxx
- Country code: +370
- International access: 00
- Long-distance: 0

Lithuania uses an open telephone numbering plan with all phone numbers having nine digits, including the prefix "0", a 1–3 digit area code, and a 5–7 digit subscriber telephone number.

== Overview ==
Lithuania uses a total of 47 area codes for landline phones, all beginning with 3, 4 or 5. Within same area code, landlines can be dialed without the prefix and the area code.

Area codes for mobile numbers begin with 6, corporate or state institution numbers with 7, toll-free, reverse-charge and shared-cost numbers with 8, and premium-rate numbers with 9.

Network services numbers begin with 1, dialed without a prefix. This includes numbers beginning with "11", reserved for emergency and special services, such as:

- 112 – National emergency number
- 113 – Non-emergency medical number
- 116 xxx – Harmonised services of social value
- 117 – Telecommunication helpline
- 118 – Directory assistance
- 119 – Fault registration

As of 2022, numbers beginning with 2 have been allocated for IoT M2M usage and are 12 significant digits in length (for a total of 15 digits, the maximum allowed by E.164) unlike regular numbers which remain 8 digits.

Before 2004, 2 was the prefix used for all area codes.

== Prefixes ==
Since 1 March 2024, Lithuania uses "0" as a trunk prefix.

The international dialling prefix is "00". Lithuania uses +370 country calling code.

During the Soviet occupation and for a period after it, the country used the Soviet numbering: +7 012 area code until 1993; the legacy numbering was used for the national area codes until it was replaced in 2001–2003; the domestic prefix "8" was replaced with "0" in 2024 (and fully deactivated in 2025), despite being planned since 2001. The delay was due to legacy emergency numbers 01, 02 and 03, which were kept active until 1 April 2022.

== National area codes (with prefix) ==
Locality	County	Code
Akmenė	Šiauliai	0 425
Alytus	Alytus	0 315
Anykščiai	Utena	0 381
Birštonas	Utena	0 319
Biržai	Panevėžys	0 450
Druskininkai	Alytus	0 313
Elektrėnai	Vilnius	0 528
Ignalina	Utena	0 386
Jonava	Kaunas	0 349
Joniškis	Šiauliai	0 426
Jurbarkas	Tauragė	0 447
Kaišiadorys	Kaunas	0 346
Kaunas	Kaunas	0 37
Kelmė	Šiauliai	0 427
Kėdainiai	Kaunas	0 347
Klaipėda	Klaipėda	0 46
Kretinga	Klaipėda	0 445
Kupiškis	Panevėžys	0 459
Lazdijai	Alytus	0 318
Marijampolė	Marijampolė	0 343
Mažeikiai	Telšiai	0 443
Molėtai	Utena	0 383
Neringa	Klaipėda	0 469
Pakruojis	Šiauliai	0 421
Palanga	Klaipėda	0 460
Panevėžys	Panevėžys	0 45
Pasvalys	Panevėžys	0 451
Plungė	Telšiai	0 448
Prienai	Kaunas	0 319
Radviliškis	Šiauliai	0 422
Raseiniai	Kaunas	0 428
Rokiškis	Panevėžys	0 458
Skuodas	Klaipėda	0 440
Šakiai	Marijampolė	0 345
Šalčininkai	Vilnius	0 380
Šiauliai	Šiauliai	0 41
Šilalė	Tauragė	0 449
Šilutė	Klaipėda	0 441
Širvintos	Vilnius	0 382
Švenčionys	Vilnius	0 387
Tauragė	Tauragė	0 446
Telšiai	Telšiai	0 444
Trakai	Vilnius	0 528
Ukmergė	Vilnius	0 340
Utena	Utena	0 389
Varėna	Alytus	0 310
Vilkaviškis	Marijampolė	0 342
Vilnius	Vilnius	0 5
Visaginas	Utena	0 386
Zarasai	Utena	0 385
