= Holy Transfiguration Church, Kėdainiai =

Eastern Orthodox church in Lithuania

Holy Transfiguration Church
- Viešpaties Atsimainymo Cerkvė
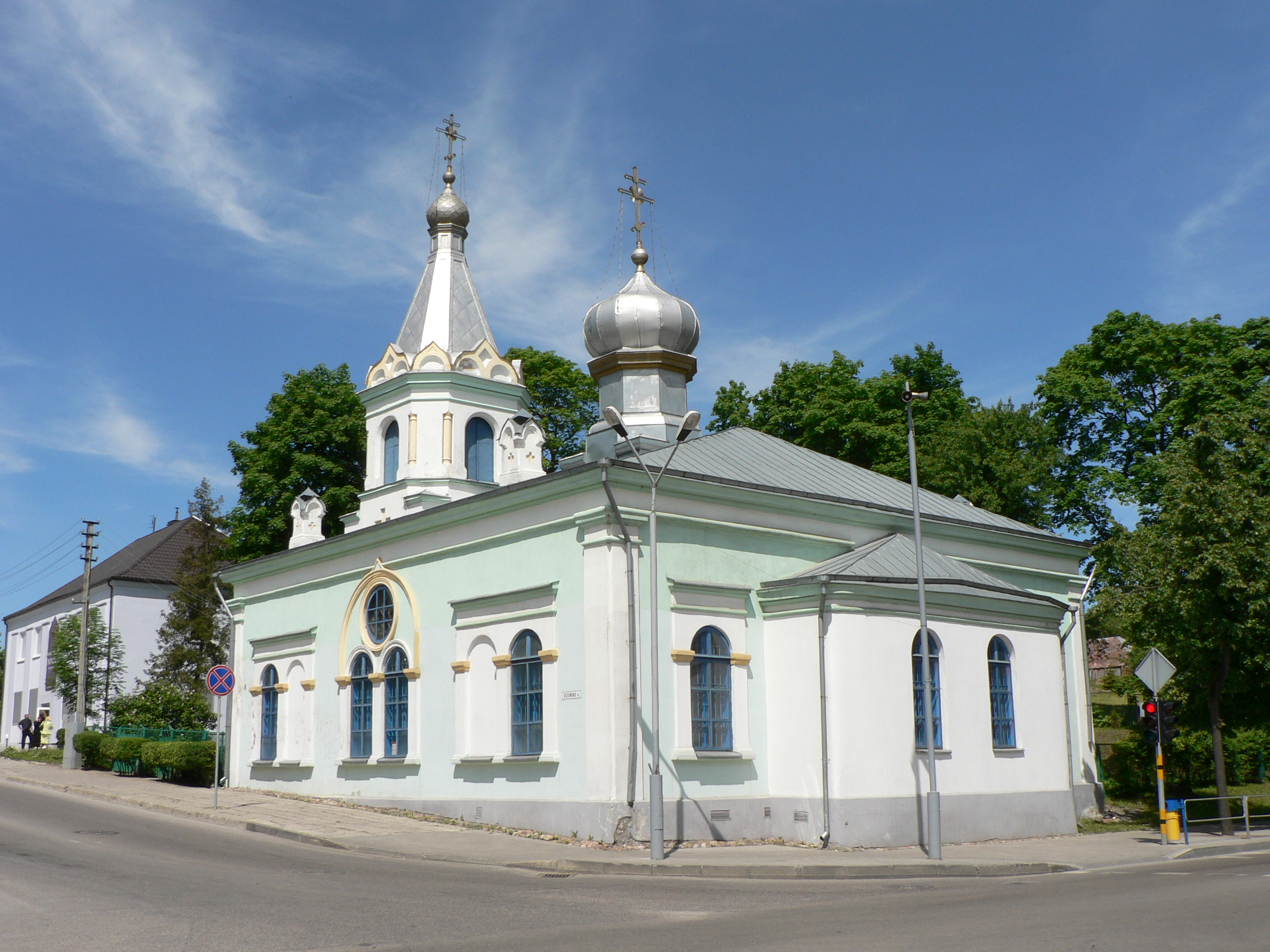

Religion
- Affiliation: Eastern Orthodox Church
- Region: Kaunas County

Location
- Location: Gedimino g. 2, 57287 Kėdainiai
- Municipality: Kėdainiai District Municipality
- Country: Lithuania
- Interactive map of Holy Transfiguration Church
- Coordinates: 55°17′19″N 23°58′27″E

Architecture
- Architect: S. Ikonikov
- Type: Church
- Style: Byzantine
- Funded by: Pyotr Stolypin
- Completed: 1861
- Materials: Brick

Holy Transfiguration Church is an Eastern Orthodox church in Kėdainiai belonging to the Russian Orthodox Diocese of Lithuania..

The first, wooden Orthodox church in Kėdainiai was constructed in 1643. From 1652 it belonged to an Orthodox monastery of the Holy Transfiguration, which was destroyed by fire in 1771. After this event the monastery was never rebuilt and the monks moved to the Holy Spirit Monastery in Vilnius. In 1798 it was officially closed. Despite the advice of the Holy Synod of the Russian Orthodox Church, the remaining church was not made a parish church because of the tiny number of Orthodox Christians living permanently in Kėdainiai. The services were held there only occasionally, wherever a Russian military unit arrived to the town.

In 1841 this situation changed together with the arrival of more Russians to the town. In 1895 the church also turned out to be too tiny and it was replaced by the one which was preserved up to today. During World War I, the church was abandoned. Only in 1918 new parish clergy arrived to Kėdainiai. It was registered as an active parish by the Soviet government in 1947, with 230 parishioners at this moment.

== Sources ==
- G. Shlevis, Православные храмы Литвы, Свято-Духов Монастыр, Vilnius 2006, ISBN 9986-559-62-6
