= Juozas Paukštelis =

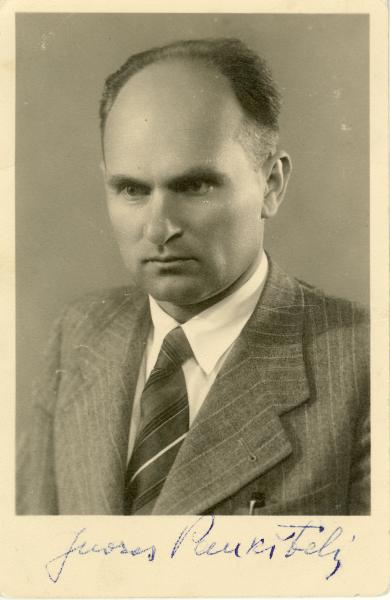

Juozas Paukštelis born Juozas Ptašinskas (March 2, 1899, Titoniai, Kovno Governorate – July 20, 1981) was a Lithuanian author and translator. His works have been translated into Russian, Polish, and Kazakh.

After receiving a degree from Kaunas University in theology and philosophy, he spent much of his life in the city of Kėdainiai, where he hosted literary gatherings. His house there is now a museum.

In 1985, the Juozas Paukštelis Award was established to honor the books that best describe rural life and its moral and social complexities.

== Works ==
- Našlės vaikas (Widow's Child), 1932
- Kaimynai (Neighbors), 1939
- Vaiduokliai (Ghosts), 1953
