= Telephone numbers in Germany =

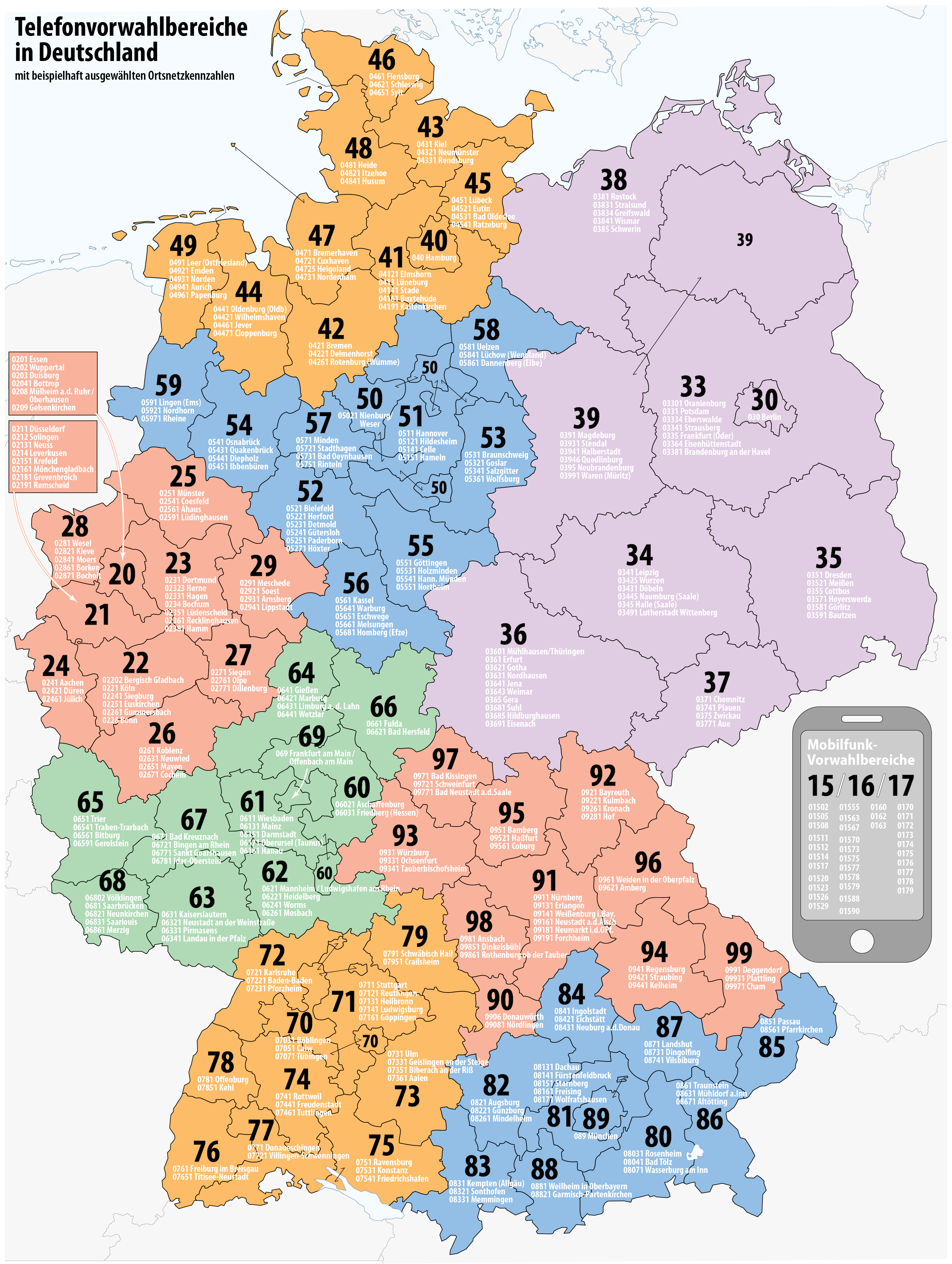
- 8 geographic zones
- Country: Germany
- Continent: Europe
- Regulator: Federal Network Agency
- Numbering plan type: Open
- NSN length: 3 to 13
- Format: (xx…) xx…
- Country code: 49
- International access: 00
- Long-distance: 0

The regulation of telephone numbers in Germany is the responsibility of the Federal Network Agency (German: Bundesnetzagentur, BNetzA) of the German government. The agency has a mandate to telecommunications in Germany and other infrastructure systems.

== Overview ==
Germany has an open telephone numbering plan with variable sizes of area codes and subscriber telephone numbers. Before 2010, area codes and subscriber telephone numbers had no fixed size, meaning that some subscriber numbers may be as short as two digits. As a result, dialing sequences are generally of a variable length, except for some non-geographic area codes for which subscriber numbers use a fixed-length format. It is not possible to determine unambiguously the end of a phone number from a prefix or the digits already dialed. This feature allows the extension of the numbering plan without revoking or changing existing numbers. Mobile telephones are assigned to non-geographic codes, making them readily recognizable.

A new numbering plan was introduced on 3 May 2010. Since then newly assigned landline telephone numbers have a standard size of eleven digits, including the area code. Area codes remained unchanged, variable in length. Exceptions to the eleven-digit rule are the cities of Berlin, Frankfurt, Hamburg, and Munich, which are the only cities with two-digit area codes and have ten-digit numbers to avoid exceeding the maximum length of eight digits for a subscriber number.

The German telephone network uses 5,200 geographical area codes, varying from two to five digits (not including the trunk code 0), with five-digit area codes being assigned only in the New States, starting with the digit 3. In general, geographic area codes start with digits 2 to 9, whereas other non-geographic area codes (including those for cell phones) are assigned to 1 and network services to 11.

== Geographic numbering ==
Geographic area codes consist of two to five digits. The maximum size of the national telephone number is eleven digits.

Telephone numbers with geographic area codes are assigned to carriers in blocks. Subscriber numbers do not start with 0 or 11 and can be dialled without the area code from landlines within the same geographic area code.

Originally, the first digits following the area code indicated a smaller service area or the type of the subscriber line (analogue or ISDN). This is no longer true as subscribers can keep their numbers when moving within an area code or when switching from analogue to ISDN. Furthermore, new carriers assign numbers from different blocks.

- (xx) xxxx-xxxx

This is the format used for the four largest geographic areas in Germany: Berlin (30), Hamburg (40), Frankfurt (69) and Munich (89).
Newly assigned numbers have a length of eight digits for the local subscriber number, yielding a total length of ten digits (not including the 0 trunk code). This is shorter than the maximum of eleven digits in other areas to avoid exceeding eight digits.
Numbers assigned in the past, which are generally grandfathered, may be as short as five digits.

- (xxx) xxxx-xxxx

In area codes of three digits, newly assigned numbers (for all locations from May 2010; earlier in some cities, e.g. Cologne in February 2007) also have eight digits, yielding a total of eleven digits. Grandfathered numbers may be as short as four digits (seven total).

- (xxxx) xxx-xxxx

In area codes with four digits, newly assigned numbers (for all locations from May 2010, earlier in some cities, e.g. Heidelberg in May 2003) have seven digits, also yielding a total of eleven digits. Grandfathered numbers may be as short as three digits (seven total) in very rural areas.

- (3xxxx) xx-xxxx

Some smaller areas in the former East Germany have five-digit area codes, all of which start with 3. Newly assigned numbers (for all locations from May 2010, earlier in some locations) have six digits, also yielding a total number length of eleven digits.

== Non-geographic numbering ==
Non-geographic numbers were originally assigned the prefix 1. However, some of these services have been moved to other area codes.

- 10xy, 100yy

These numbers can be dialled before the telephone number to select a carrier.

- 11…

Area codes starting with 11 overlap the prefix for network services. In general, these numbers cannot be dialled from abroad, with the exception being 116xxx for harmonised services of social value.

- 12xx-xxxxxxx…

The prefix 012 has been assigned as a testbed for innovative services, such as VoIP or unified messaging, for which no other area codes were available. Allocations were only valid for a maximum of five years, after which new numbers would have to be assigned. Recent requests for registrations have been declined and referred to the premium-rate services under 900. When the last remaining allocation expires in 2011, the prefix is planned to be returned to the reserved range.

- 137-xxx xxxxxxx, (138-1xxx…)

The area code 137 is assigned for services that may result in a high number of connections in a fairly short period of time, e.g. votes or competitions initiated from TV or radio shows. The first digit indicates the rate for a call, the second digit indicates the maximum number of calls that can be handled per time period.
There are also sixteen grandfathered numbers in the range 138-1, which were originally allocated by Deutsche Bundespost.

- 15xx-xxxxxxx, 16x-xxxxxxx, 17x-xxxxxxx

Mobile numbers are assigned non-geographic area codes starting with 15, 16 and 17 and have a length of three or four digits without the trunk prefix. The numbers have a total length of ten or eleven digits without the trunk prefix: numbers starting with 17 or 16 are ten digits long, except 176 and 1609, which have eleven digits like the numbers starting with 15.
Network operators issue area codes as listed in the following table.

Prefix(ex)	In use by	MNP
151, 160, 170, 171, 175	Telekom	yes
152, 162, 172, 173, 174	Vodafone	yes
155, 157, 159, 163, 176, 177, 178, 179	o2 Germany	yes
156	1&1 AG	yes
164, 168, 169	e*message (pagers)	no

However, since the advent of mobile number portability, mobile phone number prefixes can no longer be relied on to determine the current operator behind a particular mobile phone number – only the original operator. As mobile phone plans often include different rates for intra-network calls, it is important for users on such plans to know the network operator of the party they wish to call. The information on which number is registered to which cellular network is updated daily and is publicly available.
All network operators offer free automated services that can be reached via phone and/or internet and give users the ability to enter any number and determine to which network the number belongs.

- 18xx-xxxxxxx…18xxxxxxx-xx

The prefix 018 is used for user groups. The length of the block number and the terminal number is flexible from two to seven digits. However, the sum is always nine digits, yielding a total length of eleven digits including the 18.

- 180-xxxxxxx

The area code 180 is used for service-oriented services, such as call centres, hotlines, etc. Prior to 1 March 2010, these numbers were known as shared-cost services, a name that had been obsoleted by falling prices for national calls.

Prefix	Rate	rate from landlines	rate from mobile phones
180-1	time-based rate 1	0.039 €/min.	max. 0.42 €/min.
180-2	per-call rate 1	0.06 €/call	max. 0.42 €/min.
180-3	time-based rate 2	0.09 €/min.	max. 0.42 €/min.
180-4	per-call rate 2	0.20 €/call	max. 0.42 €/min.
180-5	time-based rate 3	0.14 €/min.	max. 0.42 €/min.
180-6	per-call rate 3	0.20 €/call.	max. 0.60 €/call.
180-7	time-based rate 4, first 30 seconds free	0.14 €/min. after 30s	max. 0.42 €/min. after 30s

- 181-xxx-x…, 181-xxxx-x…

The area code 181 is used for international virtual private networks (international user groups). The length of the IVPN block number is three or four digits; the terminal number may be up to seven digits.

- 19xxx

Numbers from 191 to 194 are used for dial-up access to online services (e.g. to the Internet).

- 198…, 199…

Numbers starting with 198 and 199 are reserved for routing of service numbers and network-internal use.

- 31-x

The numbers 31-0 and 31-1 are test numbers that reach a recorded announcement indicating the selected carrier for long-distance and local calls, respectively.

- 32-xxxxxxxxx

National subscriber numbers have been allocated the area code 32. They are similar to geographic numbers but not tied to a specific location, allowing for nomadic use. Unlike personal numbers, national subscriber numbers are assigned to carriers in blocks, from which these carriers can make derivative assignments to subscribers. The total length is eleven digits (not counting the 0).

- 700-xxxxxxxx

The area code 700 is used for personal numbering. Unlike national subscriber numbers, the numbers are assigned individually, allowing for memorable numbers.

- 800-xxxxxxx

The area code 800 is assigned to freephone numbers. The numbers are assigned individually, allowing for memorable numbers.

- 900-x-xxxxxx

The area code 900 is assigned to premium-rate services. The first digit following the area code indicates the service type:

Prefix	Service Type
900-1	Information services (no adult content)
900-3	Entertainment services (no adult content)
900-5	Other services (including those offering adult content)

The numbers are assigned individually, allowing for memorable numbers.

- 9009-xxxxxxx

So-called "dialers" – that is, programmes that call a premium-rate service or modify a computer's configuration to call such a service – must use numbers in the area code 9009. These programmes must also be registered with the Federal Network Agency.

=== Emergency and network services ===
Network services are not dialed with the trunk prefix 0. They resemble local numbers that start with 11 but usually cannot be dialed after an area code.

- 110 – Police
- 112 – Fire brigade, ambulance, rescue services (also the universal emergency number in the EU)
- 115 – Civil services (Bürgertelefon); requests are either answered directly or forwarded to the competent authority in the caller's region. The caller can access local government services and book appointments at government offices.
- 116 xxx – Harmonised services of social value
- 118 xx – Directory assistance
- 19 222 – Non-emergency medical transports. This number is not an emergency number but a local number assigned uniformly in all geographic area codes. This requires dialling the area code from mobile phones or other non-geographic lines.

(Originally, the block 19 xxx was used for local numbers assigned uniformly in all or several geographic area codes. All other allocations have already been converted to ordinary geographic numbers.)

== History ==
Before German reunification, East Germany used country code 37. West Berlin was integrated into the West German telephone network, using the same country code (49) of West Germany, with the area code 311, later changed to 030. Unlike West Germany, from which calls to East Berlin were made using the prefix 00372 (international access code 00, East German country code 37, area code 2), calls from West Berlin required only the short code 0372. Conversely, those made to West Berlin from East Berlin only required the short code 849.

In 1992, two years after reunification, the telephone networks were merged under country code 49.

Geographic numbers in the New States were assigned area codes starting with 3, in some cases followed by the former East German area code (without the initial 0) or a code similar to it. Thus, Leipzig, for example, which had used East German domestic area code 41, was assigned the new area code 341 in the unified telephone system. On the other hand, some area codes were changed: for example, the small town of Zossen used to have East German area code 323, but the new area code is 3377. Area code 30, formerly used by West Berlin, was assigned to the entire reunified Berlin.

Withdrawing country code 37 freed the three-digit numbering block 37x for assignments. Several countries were assigned such codes, for example: 370 for Lithuania, 374 for Armenia, 375 for Belarus, as well as some microstates whose telephone networks had formerly been integrated to those of surrounding larger countries (e.g., 376 for Andorra, 377 for Monaco and 378 for San Marino).

The German telephone network became fully digital in 1997, allowing more flexible use of the numbering space.

On 1 January 1998, the Federal Network Agency (named the Regulatory Authority for Telecommunications and Postal Services at the time) became the numbering authority for telephone numbers in Germany.

== See also ==
- List of dialing codes in Germany
- Telephone numbers in the German Democratic Republic
