= Telephone numbers in the Soviet Union =

Telephone numbers in Soviet Union
- Location of the Soviet Union after World War II (dark green)
- Country: Soviet Union
- Continent: Europe
- Numbering plan type: Open
- NSN length: 8~10
- Format: various, see text
- Country code: 7
- International access: 8~10
- Long-distance: 8

The telephone numbering plan of the USSR was a set of telephone area codes, numbers and dialing rules, which operated in the Soviet Union until the 1990s. After the collapse of the USSR, many newly independent republics implemented their own numbering plans. However, many of the principles of the Soviet numbering plan still remain. The former Soviet country code 7 is still retained by Russia and Kazakhstan.

== Basic principles ==
The Soviet Union used a four-level open numbering plan. The long-distance prefix was 8.

1. Local numbers could be dialed directly, and usually consisted of 5-7 digits, with seven-digit numbers only occurring in Moscow (since 1968), Leningrad (since 1976) and Kiev (since 1981). If the internal number of the regional center had less than 7 digits, then its intercity code was supplemented with numbers (usually 2 for the administrative center, 6 for the second largest city).
  For example, with the code 423 of Primorsky Krai: 423 22 was the code of Vladivostok, while 423 66 was the code of Nakhodka.
2. Within the same numbering area (most often within the state or region) the pattern was: 8 2X YYYYYY, where 2 replaced the three-digit area code.
  For example: 8 2 24 XXXXX for a call to the city of Klin, Klinsky District, Moscow Oblast from Moscow and the Moscow Oblast.
3. For calls to other areas, one had to first dial long-distance prefix 8, then, after the tone, the full code of the numbering area, which consisted of a three-digit code and zone additional digit(X), and then the local phone number.
  For example: 8 096 24 XXXXX for a call to the city of Klin, Klinsky District, Moscow Oblast from other regions.
4. For international calls, one should dial 8 10 [country code] [code] [phone number].
  For example: 8 10 1 212 XXXXXXX for a call to New York City.
  Also: 8 10 359 2 XXXXXX for a call to the city of Sofia.

== Emergency and service numbers ==
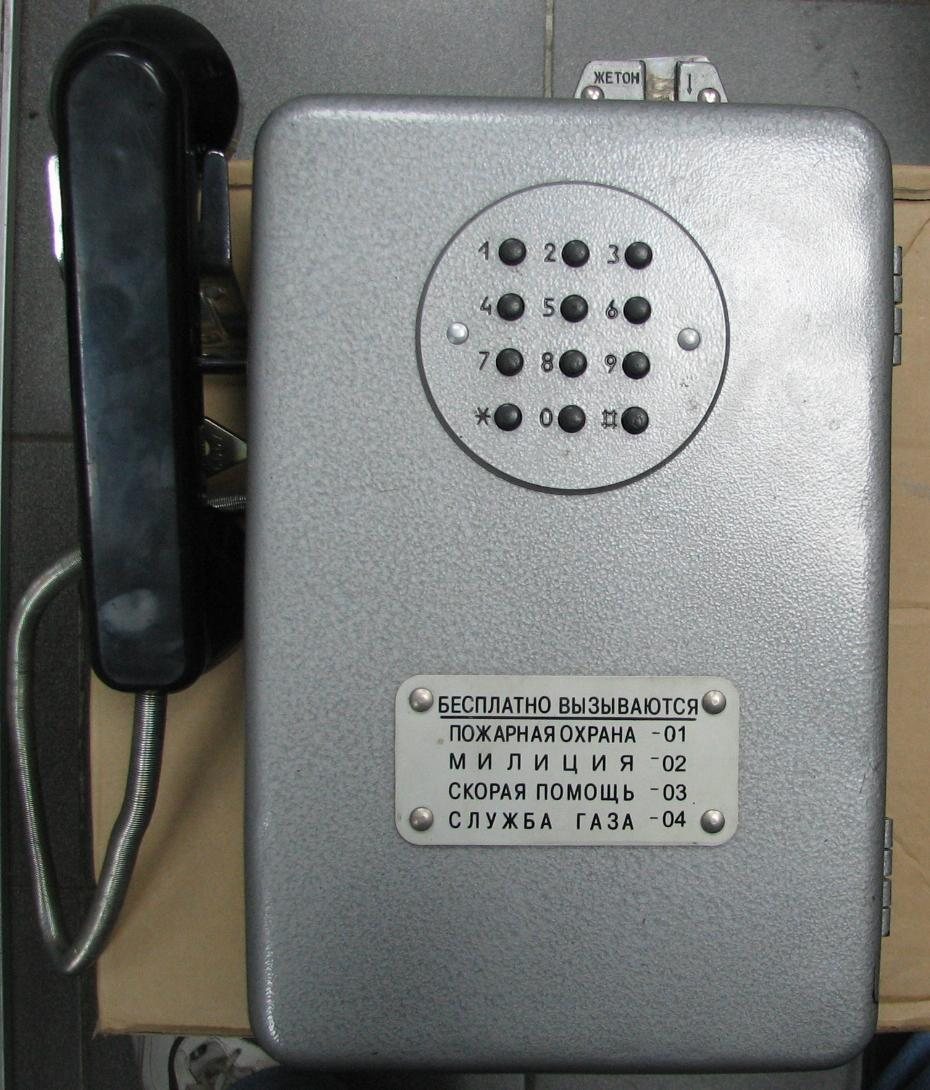
A payphone with a list of toll-free numbers

Emergency numbers in the USSR began with 0 and had two digits. When one called the emergency numbers, no tariff was charged. (However, in Moscow in the late 1980s calling emergency services from a payphone was not free, despite the declared free-of-charge numbers.)

- 01 - Fire brigade
- 02 - Police
- 03 - Ambulance
- 04 - Gas leaks
- 05 was used in some major cities as a city certificate of addresses of residents or organizations
- 06 was used in many cities (and in some cases is still) for reception of telegrams through the home telephone
- 07 was used to order long-distance calls through the operator
- 08 was used and continues to be used to contact the telephone repair bureau
- 09 was a telephone directory service (search for a phone by the name of the organization or the subscriber).

In addition, in Moscow there was and continues to operate a toll-free telephone number 100 to get the current time. The free telephone service of the exact time is preserved in also other cities of Russia; for example in Kaliningrad this number is 060.

== Area codes ==
Area codes were assigned geographically, so that neighboring regions usually had close area code numbers.

=== Area 0 ===
Area codes with 0 denotes the republics and Oblasts of the European part of the USSR. After the collapse of the Soviet Union, these codes in Russia, Belarus and Ukraine were preserved, with minor changes. Area codes in Ukraine and Belarus later dropped initial 0. In Russia, in December 2005 the leading zero in the Oblastal area codes was replaced by a 4 with the next 2 numbers same (except Kaliningrad Oblast turning from 011 to 401 as 411 is in use).

- 011 - Kaliningrad Oblast, Russian SFSR
- 012 - Lithuania
- 013 - Latvia
- 014 - Estonia
- 015 - Grodno Region, Byelorussia
- 016 - Brest Oblast, Byelorussia
- 017 - Minsk Oblast, Byelorussia
- 021 - Vitebsk Oblast, Byelorussia
- 022 - Mogilev Oblast, Byelorussia
- 023 - Gomel Oblast, Byelorussia
- 031 - Transcarpathian Oblast, Ukraine
- 032 - Lviv Oblast, Ukraine
- 033 - Volyn Oblast, Ukraine
- 034 - Ivano-Frankivsk Oblast, Ukraine
- 035 - Ternopil Oblast, Ukraine
- 036 - Rivne Oblast, Ukraine
- 037 - Chernivtsi Oblast, Ukraine
- 038 - Khmelnytsky Oblast, Ukraine
- 041 - Zhytomyr Oblast, Ukraine
- 042 - Moldova
- 043 - Vinnytsia Oblast, Ukraine
- 044 - Kiev and Kiev Oblast, Ukraine
- 046 - Chernigov Oblast, Ukraine
- 047 - Cherkasy Oblast, Ukraine
- 048 - Odessa Oblast, Ukraine
- 051 - Nikolaev Oblast, Ukraine
- 052 - Kirovograd Oblast, Ukraine
- 053 - Poltava Oblast, Ukraine
- 054 - Sumy Oblast, Ukraine
- 055 - Kherson Oblast, Ukraine
- 056 - Dnepropetrovsk Oblast, Ukraine
- 057 - Kharkov Oblast, Ukraine
- 061 - Zaporozhye Oblast, Ukraine
- 062 - Donetsk Oblast, Ukraine
- 064 - Voroshilovgrad Oblast, Ukraine
- 065 - Crimea Oblast, Ukraine
- 069 - Sevastopol, Ukraine
- 071 - Kursk Oblast, Russian SFSR
- 072 - Belgorod Oblast, Russian SFSR
- 073 - Voronezh Oblast, Russian SFSR
- 074 - Lipetsk Oblast, Russian SFSR
- 075 - Tambov Oblast, Russian SFSR
- 081 - Smolensk Oblast, Russian SFSR
- 082 - Kalinin Oblast, Russian SFSR
- 083 - Bryansk Oblast, Russian SFSR
- 084 - Kaluga Oblast, Russian SFSR
- 085 - Yaroslavl Oblast, Russian SFSR
- 086 - Orel Oblast, Russian SFSR
- 087 - Tula Oblast, Russian SFSR
- 091 - Ryazan Oblast, Russian SFSR
- 092 - Vladimir Oblast, Russian SFSR
- 093 - Ivanovo Oblast, Russian SFSR
- 094 - Kostroma Oblast, Russian SFSR
- 095 - Moscow (city), Russian SFSR
- 096 - Moscow Oblast (without the suburbs of Moscow), Russian SFSR
- 097 - Governmental phone network in Moscow region (Iskra / Iskra-2)

=== Area 3 ===
- 301 - Buryat ASSR, Russian SFSR
- 302 - Chita Oblast, Russian SFSR
- 310 - Zhezkazgan Oblast, Kazakhstan (merged into Karagandy Region, western half now separated as Ulytau Region)
- 311 - Ural Oblast (now West Kazakhstan), Kazakhstan
- 312 - Guryev Oblast, Kazakhstan
- 313 - Aktobe Oblast, Kazakhstan
- 314 - Kustanaiska Oblast, Kazakhstan
- 315 - North Kazakhstan, Kazakhstan
- 316 - Kokchetav Oblast, Kazakhstan (now split between North Kazakhstan and Akmola Region)
- 317 - Tselinograd Oblast (now for Nur-Sultan only), Kazakhstan
- 318 - Pavlodar Oblast, Kazakhstan
- 319 - Issyk-Kul Oblast, Kirghizia
- 321 - Karaganda Oblast, Kazakhstan
- 322 - Semipalatinsk Oblast, Kazakhstan (merged into East Kazakhstan, separated again as Abai Region)
- 323 - East Kazakhstan Oblast, Kazakhstan
- 324 - Kyzyl-Orda Oblast, Kazakhstan
- 325 - Shymkent Oblast, Kazakhstan
- 326 - Dzhambul Oblast, Kazakhstan
- 327 - Alma-Ata Oblast, Kazakhstan
- 328 - Taldykorgan Oblast, Kazakhstan (merged into Almaty Region, separated again as Jetisu Region)
- 329 - Mangistau Oblast, Kazakhstan
- 330 - Turgay Oblast, Kazakhstan (now split between Kostanay and Akmola)
- 331 - Chuy Oblast, Kirghizia
- 332 - Osh Oblast, Kirghizia
- 334 - Talas Region, Kirghizia
- 335 - Naryn Region, Kirghizia
- 336 22 - Baikonur, Kyzyl-Orda Oblast, Kazakhstan
- 341 - Udmurt ASSR, Russian SFSR
- 342 - Perm Oblast, Russian SFSR
- 343 - Sverdlovsk Oblast, Russian SFSR
- 345 - Tyumen Oblast, Russian SFSR
- 347 - Bashkir ASSR, Russian SFSR
- 351 - Chelyabinsk Oblast, Russian SFSR
- 352 - Kurgan Oblast, Russian SFSR
- 353 - Orenburg Oblast, Russian SFSR
- 360 - Tashauz Oblast, Turkmenia
- 361 - Karakalpakstan ASSR, Uzbekistan
- 362 - Khorezm Oblast, Uzbekistan
- 363 - Ashgabat Oblast, Turkmenia
- 365 - Bukhara Oblast, Uzbekistan
- 366 - Samarkand Oblast, Uzbekistan
- 367 - Syrdarya Oblast, Uzbekistan
- 369 - Namangan Oblast, Uzbekistan
- 370 - Mary Oblast, Turkmenistan
- 371 - Tashkent Oblast, Uzbekistan
- 372 - Djizzak, Uzbekistan
- 373 - Ferghana Oblast, Uzbekistan
- 374 - Andijan, Uzbekistan
- 375 - Kashkadarya, Uzbekistan
- 376 - Surkhandarya, Uzbekistan
- 377 - Districts of Republican Subordination, Kulob Oblast, Kurgan Oblast and Gorno-Badakhshan, Tajikistan
- 378 - Charjev Oblast, Turkmenia
- 379 - Sughd, Tajikistan
- 381 - Omsk Oblast, Russian SFSR
- 382 - Tomsk Oblast, Russian SFSR
- 383 - Novosibirsk Oblast, Russian SFSR
- 384 - Kemerovo Oblast, Russian SFSR
- 385 - Altai Krai, Russian SFSR
- 391 - Krasnoyarsk Territory, Russian SFSR
- 394 - Tuvan ASSR, Russian SFSR
- 395 - Irkutsk Oblast, Russian SFSR

=== Area 4 ===
- 411 - Yakut ASSR, Russian SFSR
- 413 - Magadan, Russian SFSR
- 415 - Kamchatka, Russian SFSR
- 416 - Amur Oblast, Russian SFSR
- 421 - Khabarovsk Krai, Russian SFSR
- 423 - Primorsky Krai, Russian SFSR
- 424 - Sakhalin Oblast, Russian SFSR
- 432 - Krasnovodsk Oblast, Turkmenia
- 436 - Navoiy Region, Uzbekistan

=== Area 8 ===
- 811 - Pskov Oblast, Russian SFSR
- 812 - Leningrad, Russian SFSR
- 813 - Leningrad Oblast, Russian SFSR
- 814 - Karelian ASSR, Russian SFSR
- 815 - Murmansk, Russian SFSR
- 816 - Novgorod Oblast, Russian SFSR
- 817 - Vologda Oblast, Russian SFSR
- 818 - Arkhangelsk Oblast, Russian SFSR
- 821 - Komi ASSR, Russian SFSR
- 831 - Gorky Oblast, Russian SFSR
- 833 - Kirov Oblast, Russian SFSR
- 834 - Mordovian ASSR, Russian SFSR
- 835 - Chuvash ASSR, Russian SFSR
- 836 - Mari ASSR, Russian SFSR
- 841 - Penza Oblast, Russian SFSR
- 842 - Ulyanovsk Oblast, Russian SFSR
- 843 - Tatar ASSR, Russian SFSR
- 844 - Volgograd Oblast, Russian SFSR
- 845 - Saratov Oblast, Russian SFSR
- 846 - Kuibyshev Oblast, Russian SFSR
- 847 - Kalmyk ASSR, Russian SFSR
- 851 - Astrakhan Oblast, Russian SFSR
- 861 - Krasnodar, Russian SFSR
- 862 2 - Sochi, Russian SFSR
- 863 - Rostov Oblast, Russian SFSR
- 865 - Stavropol Oblast, Russian SFSR
- 866 - Kabardino-Balkar ASSR, Russian SFSR
- 867 - North Ossetian ASSR, Russian SFSR
- 871 - Checheno-Ingush ASSR, Russian SFSR
- 872 - Dagestan ASSR, Russian SFSR
- 881 - Abkhaz ASSR, Georgia
- 882 - Adjarian ASSR, Georgia
- 883 - Other parts of Georgia and South Ossetian Autonomous Oblast
- 885 - Armenia
- 892 - Azerbaijan (East)
- 895 - Azerbaijan (West)

== Legacy ==
After the breakup of the Soviet Union, except for Russia and Kazakhstan, every other post Soviet state adopted a new telephone country code.

- 370 assigned to Lithuania in 1993
- 371 assigned to Latvia in 1993
- 372 assigned to Estonia in 1993
- 373 assigned to Moldova in 1993
- 374 assigned to Armenia in 1995
- 375 assigned to Belarus in 1995
- 380 assigned to Ukraine in 1995
- 7 retained by Russia and Kazakhstan
- 992 assigned to Tajikistan in 1998
- 993 assigned to Turkmenistan in 1998
- 994 assigned to Azerbaijan in 1998
- 995 assigned to Georgia in 1998
- 996 assigned to Kyrgyzstan in 1998
- 997 reserved for Kazakhstan in 2021 but was not implemented; as of 2026 Kazakhstan continues to share 7 with Russia
- 998 assigned to Uzbekistan in 1998

== See also ==
- Telecommunications in Russia

== Sources ==
- РУКОВОДЯЩИЙ ДОКУМЕНТ ПО ОБЩЕГОСУДАРСТВЕННОЙ СИСТЕМЕ АВТОМАТИЗИРОВАННОЙ ТЕЛЕФОННОЙ СВЯЗИ (ОГСТфС) Книга I (in Russian)
- https://web.archive.org/web/20120818213319/http://code.agava.ru/sngsity/sng01.htm
- https://web.archive.org/web/20100428003821/http://phonecodes.by.ru/01.html
- https://web.archive.org/web/20080625005301/http://www.scross.ru/guide/phone-local/
