= Kėdainiai railway station =

Railway station in Lithuania

Kėdainiai
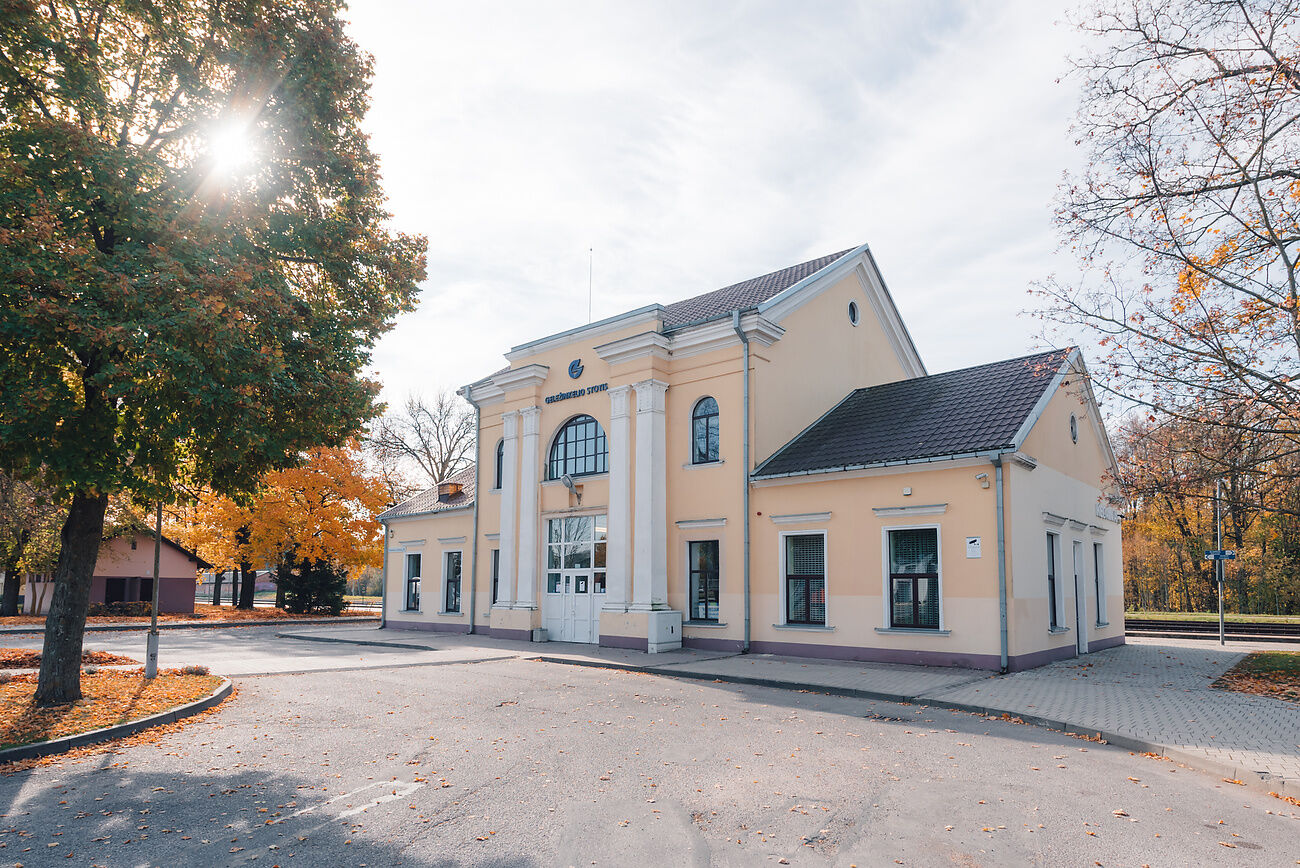

General information
- Location: S. Dariaus ir S. Girėno g. 5, Kėdainiai; Lithuania
- Coordinates: 55°16′14″N 24°01′01″E
- Operator: Lietuvos geležinkeliai
- Line: Vilnius–Šiauliai–Klaipėda
- Platforms: 2
- Tracks: 4
- Train operators: Lietuvos geležinkeliai
- Connections: 1, 7

Other information
- Website: www.litrail.lt

History
- Opened: 1871

Key dates
- 1944: Demolished

Passengers
- 2015: 18,674 per year ▼20.17%
Location
- Location within Lithuania

Kėdainiai railway station (Lithuanian: Kėdainių geležinkelio stotis) is a Lithuanian Railways station in Kėdainiai serving passenger trains.

== History ==
The main hall of the station was built in 1871, soon after the first section of Libau–Romny Railway line was laid between Kaišiadorys and Liepāja. Regular trains started running on 11 September 1871.

The newly built railway made a significant impact on city's trade development, as it gave access to Vilnius, Šiauliai, Riga, Liepāja, Moscow, as well as other cities in Belarus and Ukraine. It is known that a total of 38,035 kg of cucumbers were transported from the station in 1896. The following year 10 wagons left just to Liepāja.

On 1 August 1944, the building was demolished by retreating Nazis.

Map of the Lithuanian railway network

== See also ==
- List of railway stations in Lithuania
- Rail transport in Lithuania
- Transport in Lithuania
