= Kėdainiai =

- City
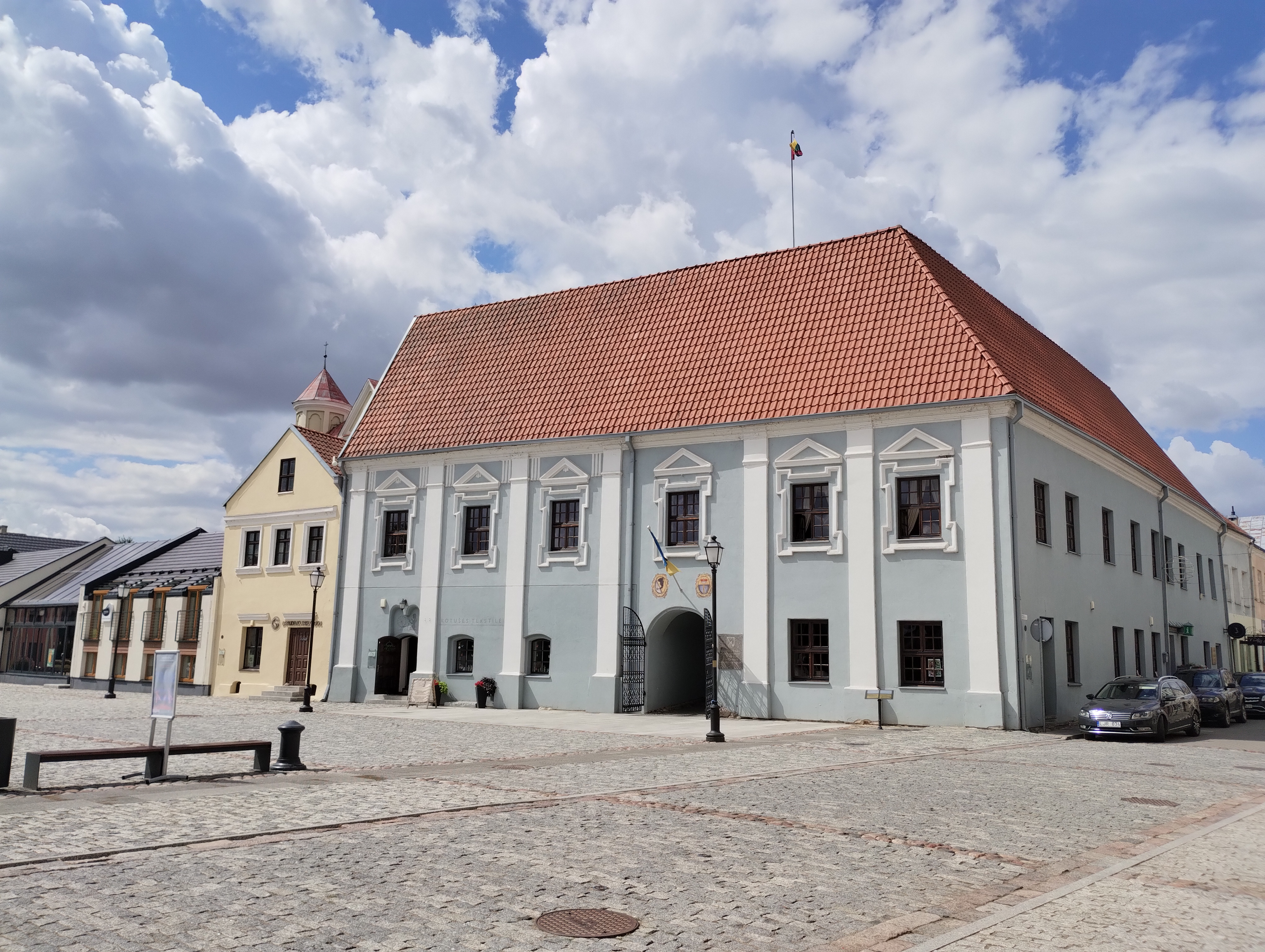
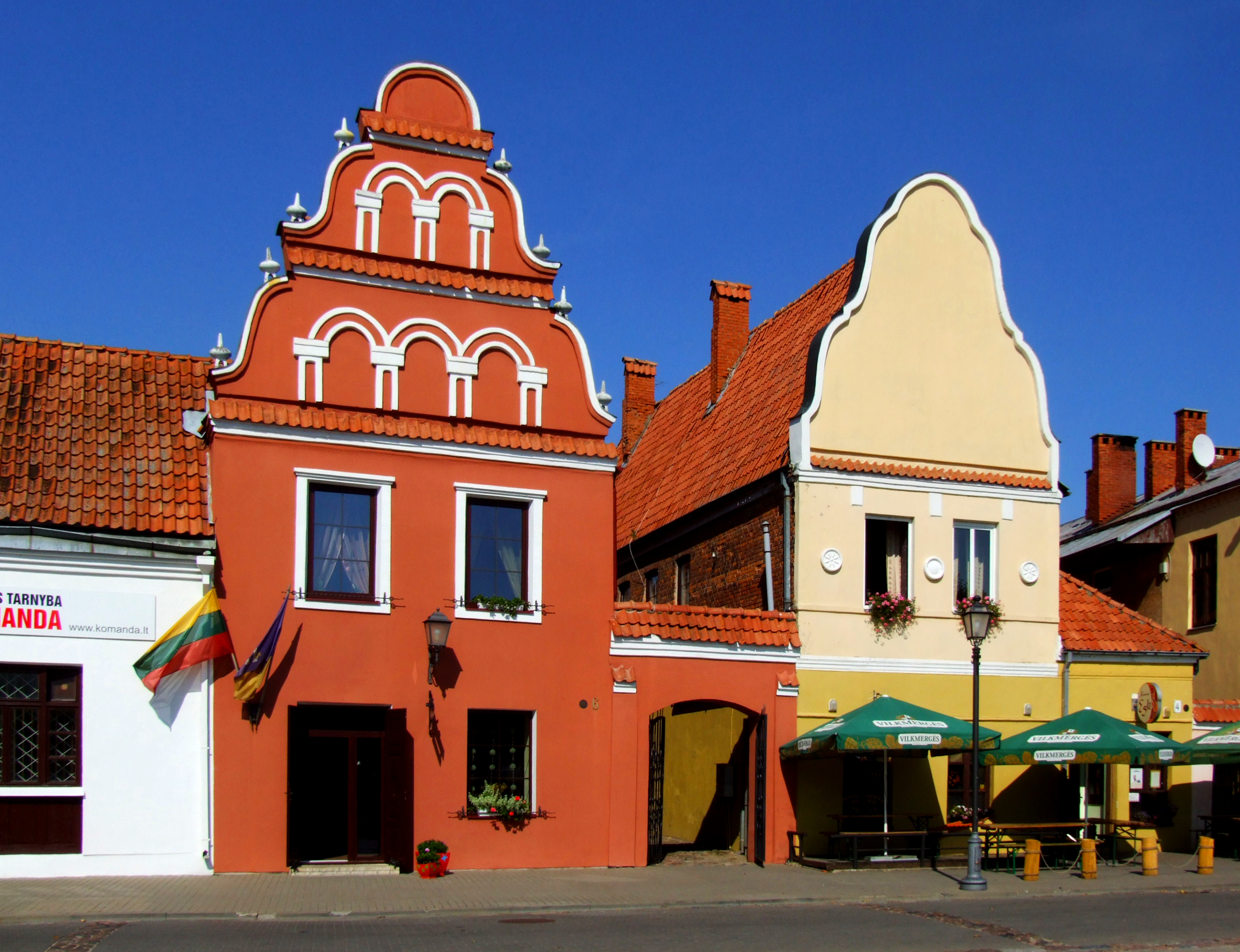
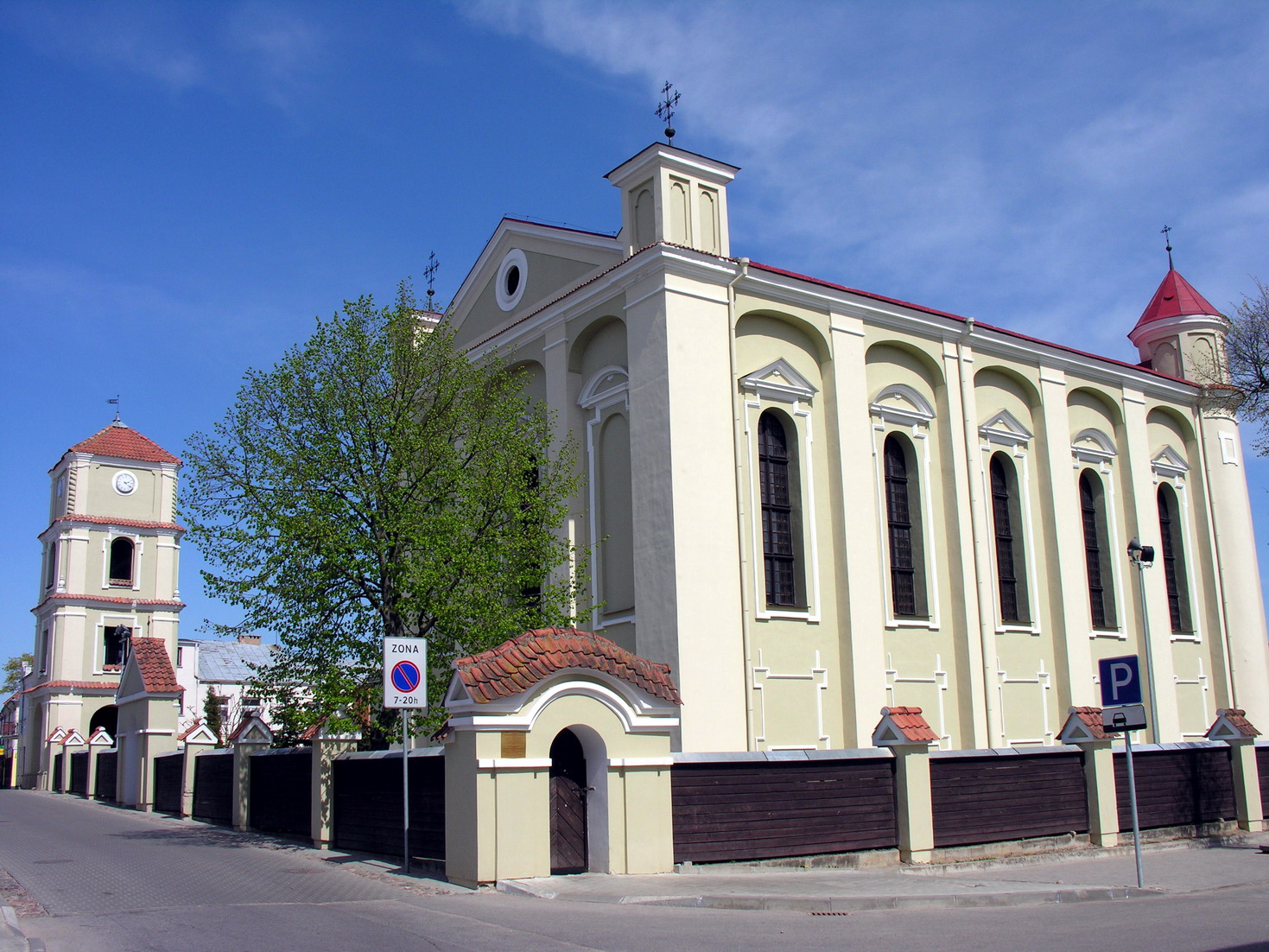
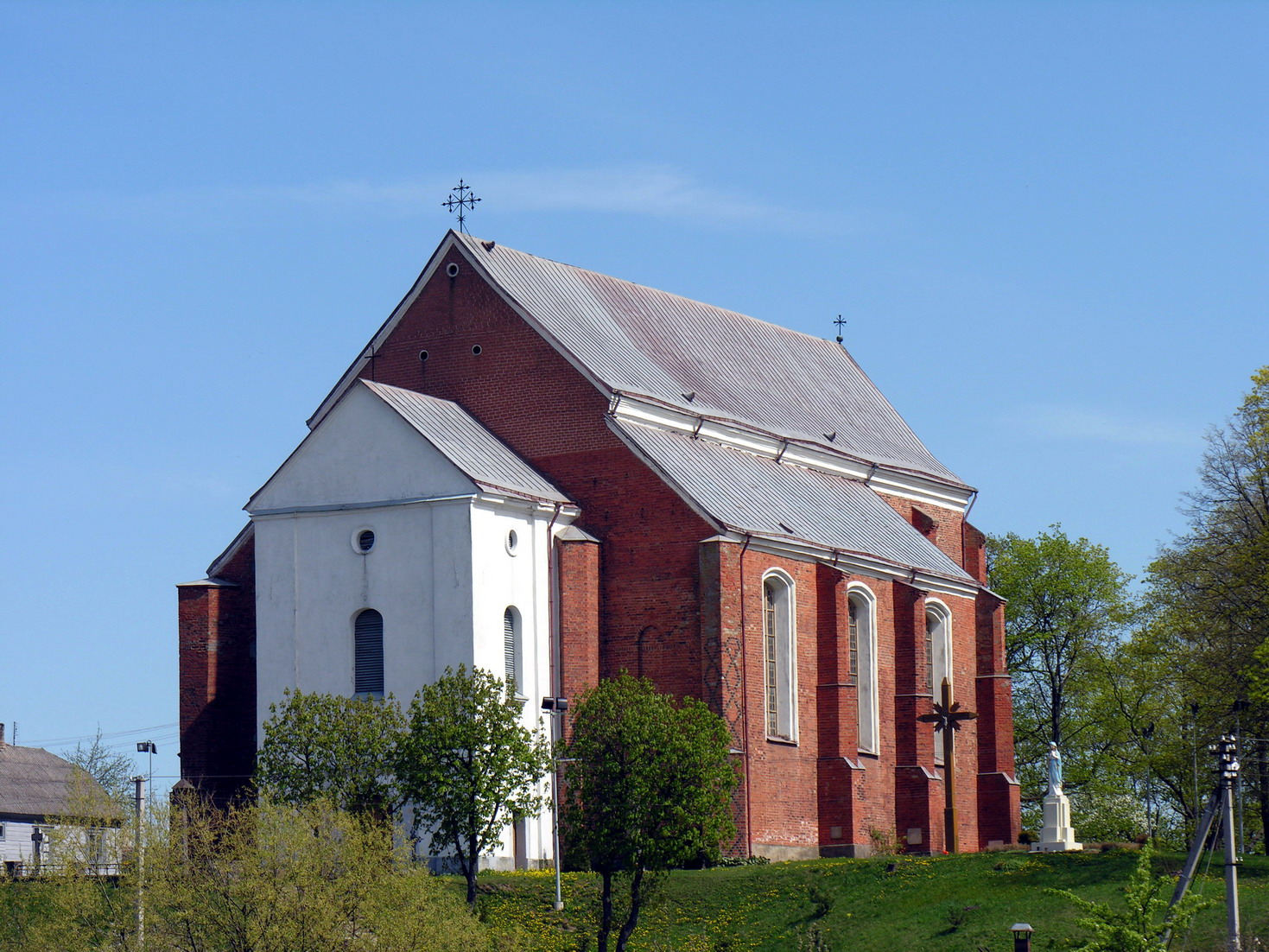
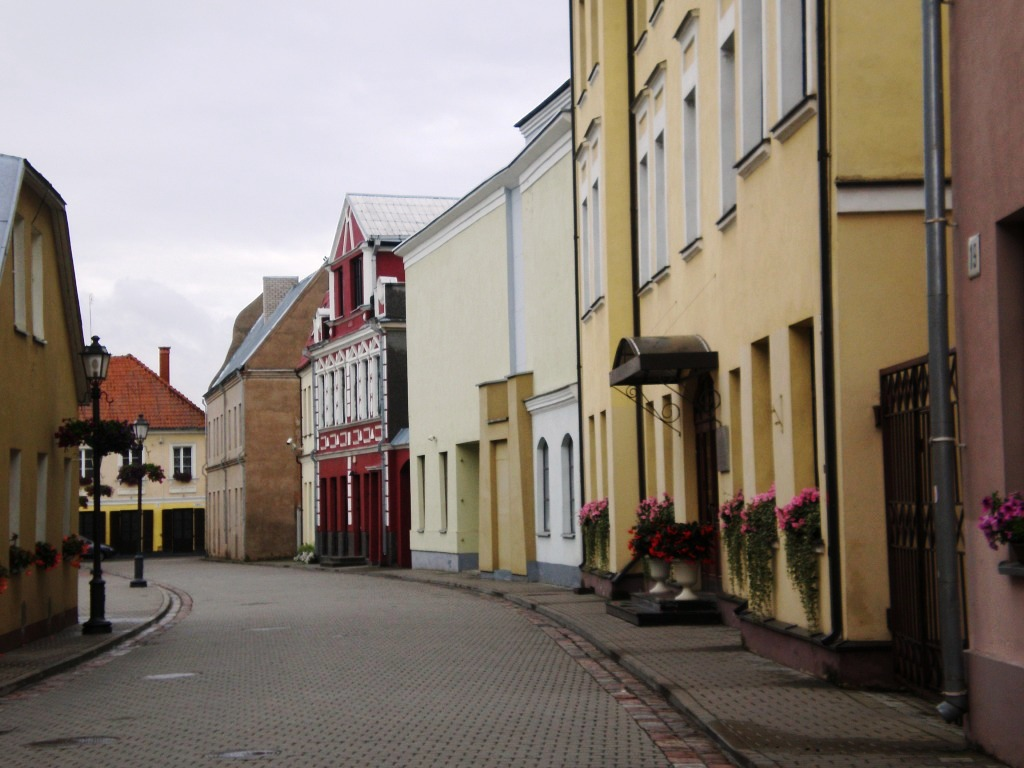
- Kėdainiai Town Hall Old architecture in Market Square Evangelical Reformed Church Catholic Church of St. George Didžioji Street of the old town

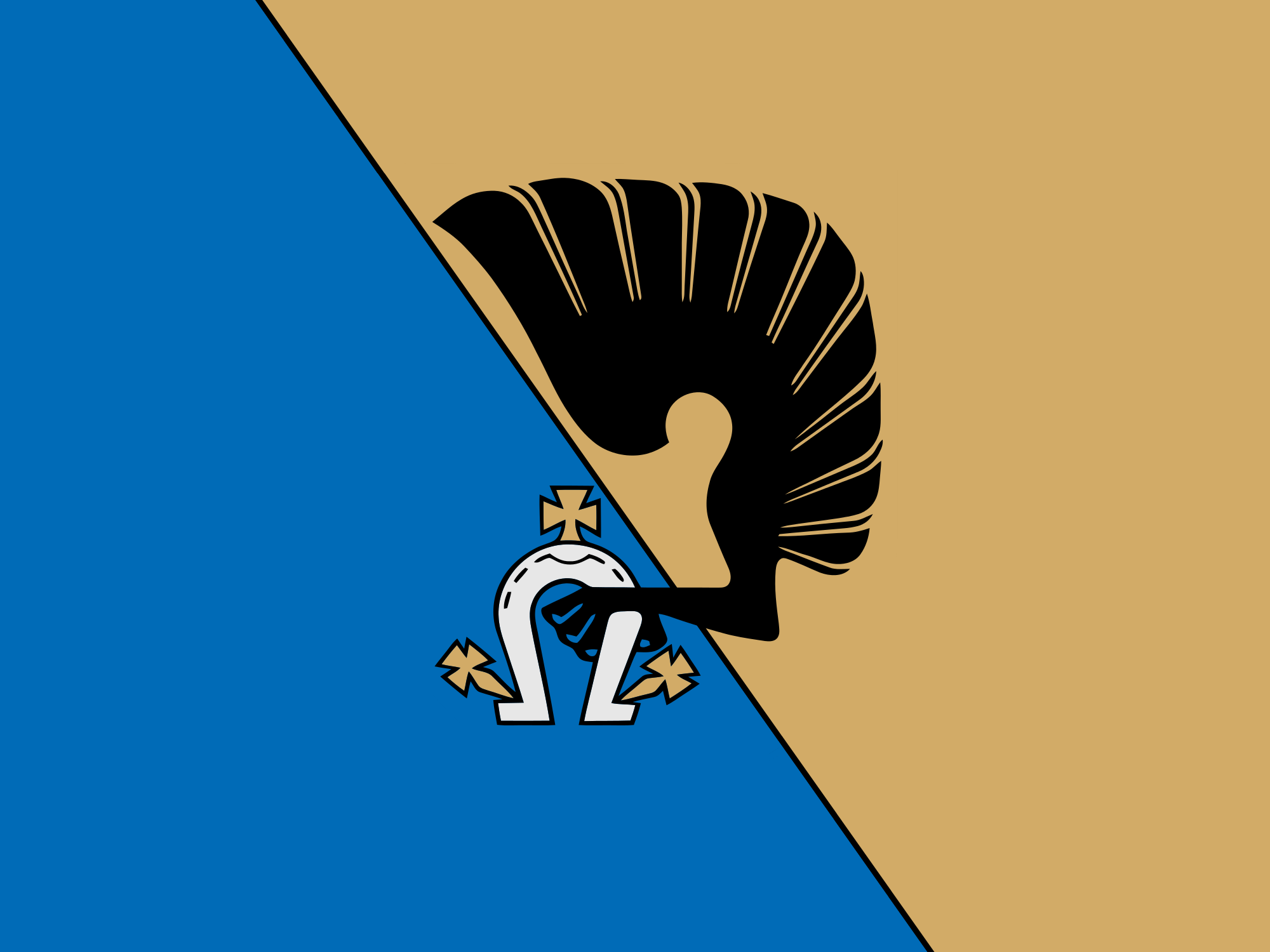
- Flag Coat of arms

- Location of Kėdainiai
- Coordinates: 55°17′N 23°58′E
- Country: Lithuania
- Ethnographic region: Aukštaitija
- County: Kaunas County
- Municipality: Kėdainiai district municipality
- Eldership: Kėdainiai City Eldership
- Capital of: Kėdainiai district municipality Kėdainiai City Eldership
- First mentioned: 1372
- Granted city rights: 1590
- Neighbourhoods: List: Babėnai; Jonušava; Justinava; Old Town

Government
  - Type: Municipal Council
  - Mayor: Valentinas Tamulis

Area
  - Total: 26.97 km^{2} (10.41 sq mi)
- Elevation: 39 m (128 ft)

Population (2023)
  - Total: 23,447
  - Density: 869.4/km^{2} (2,252/sq mi)
- Demonym(s): Kėdainians (English) kėdainiškiai (Lithuanian)
- Time zone: UTC+2 (EET)
  - Summer (DST): UTC+3 (EEST)
- Postal code: 57xxx
- Website: kedainiai.lt

Kėdainiai (Lithuanian: [kʲeːˈdâːɪ.nʲɛɪ̯ˑ]) is a city in Lithuania. It is located on the banks of the Nevėžis river 45 km (28 mi) north of Kaunas, Lithuania's second largest city. Its population as of 2022 was 23,051. The Kėdainiai Old Town dates to the 17th century and many of its historical buildings were preserved.

The town is the administrative centre of the Kėdainiai District Municipality. The geographical centre of Lithuania is in the nearby village of Ruoščiai in the eldership of Dotnuva.

Other smaller villages circle the territory in a distance of five miles or a little further from the St. George's Church of Kėdainiai — Lančiūnava, Kapliai, Labūnava, Josvainiai, Dotnuva, and Kalnaberžė.

== Names ==
The city has been known by other names: Kiejdany in Polish, Keidan (קיידאן) in Yiddish, and Kedahnen in German. Kėdainiai other alternate forms include Kidan, Kaidan, Keidany, Keydan, Kiedamjzeÿ ("j" /e/), Kuidany, and Kidainiai.

== History ==
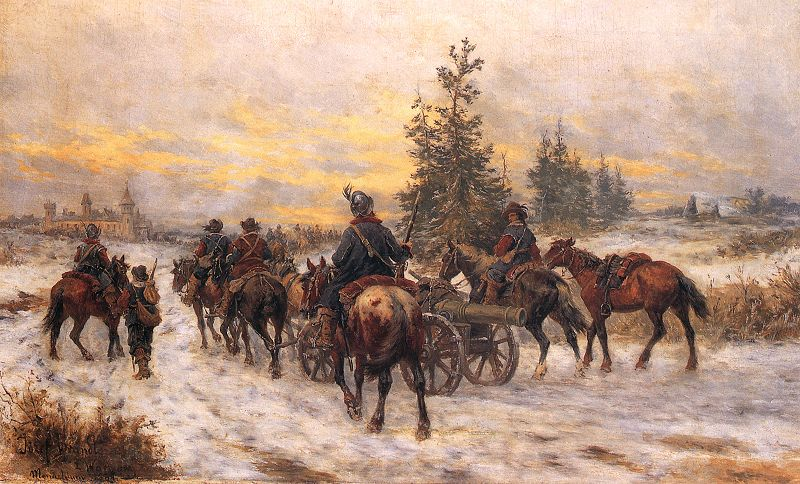
The March of Swedes for Kiejdany (Kėdainiai), Józef Brandt, (1889)

One of the oldest settlements in the country, Kėdainiai was first mentioned in the 1372 Livonian Chronicle of Hermann de Wartberge, and became a city in 1590. The area was the site of several battles during "The Deluge", the 17th century war between the Polish–Lithuanian Commonwealth and Sweden. In 1655 a short-lived treaty with Sweden, the Union of Kėdainiai, was signed by two members of Radziwiłł family in their Kėdainiai castle. While little remains of the Radziwiłł castle, the crypt of the Calvinist church (1631) houses the family mausoleum, including the tombs of Krzysztof Radziwiłł and his son Janusz.

Scottish Protestants arrived in the late 16th and 17th centuries, encouraged by the conversion of Anna Radziwill; the community exerted considerable influence in the city and persisted until the mid-19th century. The grouping of the buildings around the town square still include the imposing homes of merchants known as the "Scottish Houses". These include; the George Anderson House, the John Arnot House, the George Bennet House, the James Gray House, the Steel Property, and the surviving basement of the Alexander Gordon house.

A local custom called on all visitors to bring a stone to be used in the town's construction.

The 1st Lithuanian National Cavalry Brigade was stationed in the town in 1790.

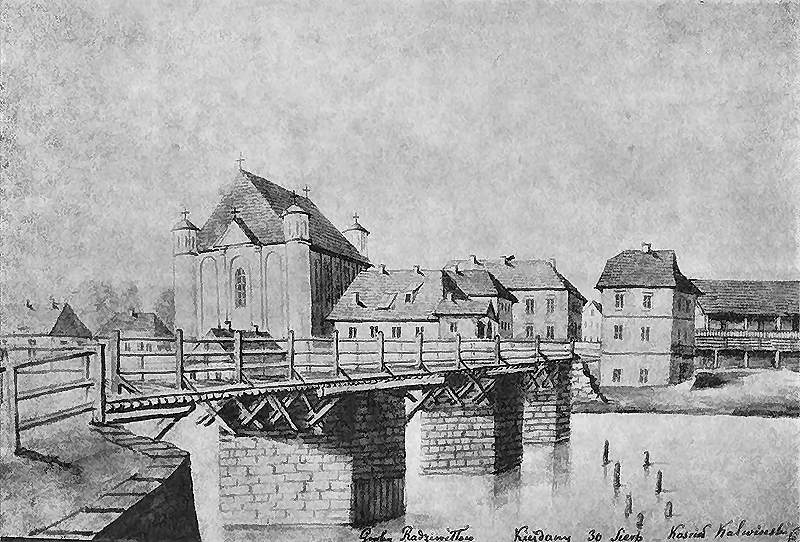
Kėdainiai in 19th century by Napoleon Orda

=== World War II ===
In 1940, the town was invaded and occupied by the Soviet Union. During Operation Barbarossa, Kėdainiai was occupied by the German Army in the summer of 1941. On August 28, 1941, the entire Jewish community of Kėdainiai, a community which had inhabited the area for 500 years, were killed under the direction of German Special Police Battalions, with the aid of the local Lithuanian population. The Jewish population prior to the Holocaust was 3000.

=== Soviet occupation ===
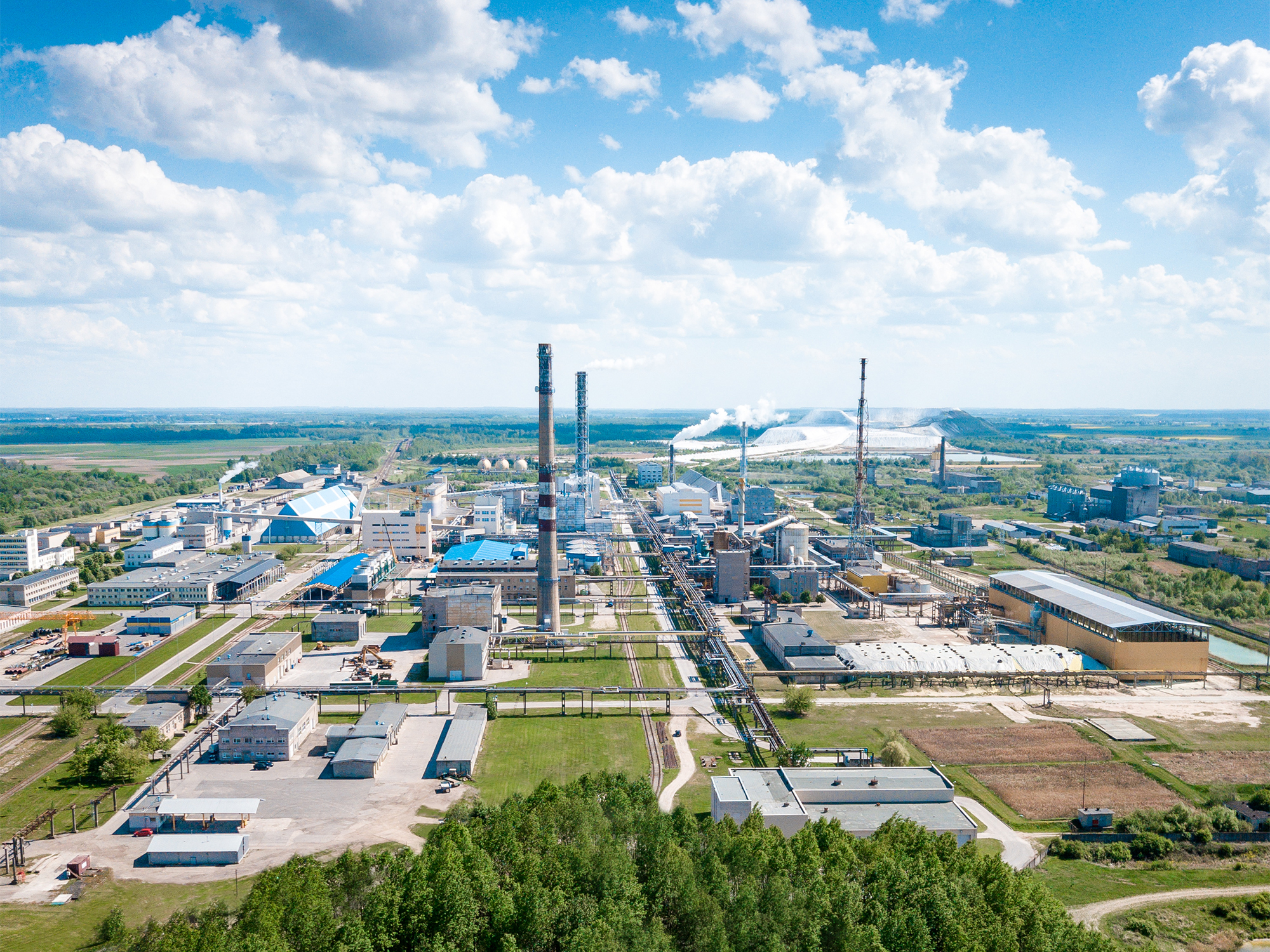
Lifosa AB chemical plant in Kėdainiai

During the Cold War, it was home to Kėdainiai air base, a major Soviet military airlift facility.

For many years, Kėdainiai was known for its chemical and food processing industries. The Kėdainiai chemical plant, Lifosa, began operations in January 1963. Publicized as a milestone in the industrialization of Lithuania, it emitted significant quantities of sulfuric acid and was the subject of ecological protests in the 1980s.

=== Independent Lithuania ===
Following years of stagnation, old enterprises have come back to life in Kėdainiai since Lithuanian independence in 1990, and new ones have been established, contributing to the city's status as a regional economic stronghold.

== Demographics ==
Historical population

Year	Pop.	±% p.a.
1823	3,000	—
1833	2,597	−1.43%
1865	3,455	+0.90%
1895	4,368	+0.78%
1897	6,113	+18.30%
1923	7,415	+0.75%
1931	7,761	+0.57%

Year	Pop.	±% p.a.
1939	8,662	+1.38%
1959	10,580	+1.01%
1966	15,900	+5.99%
1970	19,795	+5.63%
1974	24,500	+5.48%
1976	26,600	+4.20%
1979	27,886	+1.59%

Year	Pop.	±% p.a.
1989	33,840	+1.95%
2001	32,048	−0.45%
2006	31,308	−0.47%
2011	26,648	−3.17%
2018	23,367	−1.86%

Source: 1902, 1923, 1959 & 1970, 1979, 1989, 2001, 2011

== Transportation ==
Kėdainiai is accessed by Via Baltica highway from Kaunas and Panevėžys, and by rail from Vilnius, Klaipėda and Šiauliai. It is also served by Kaunas International Airport, the second largest airport in Lithuania, located in Karmėlava.

== Culture ==
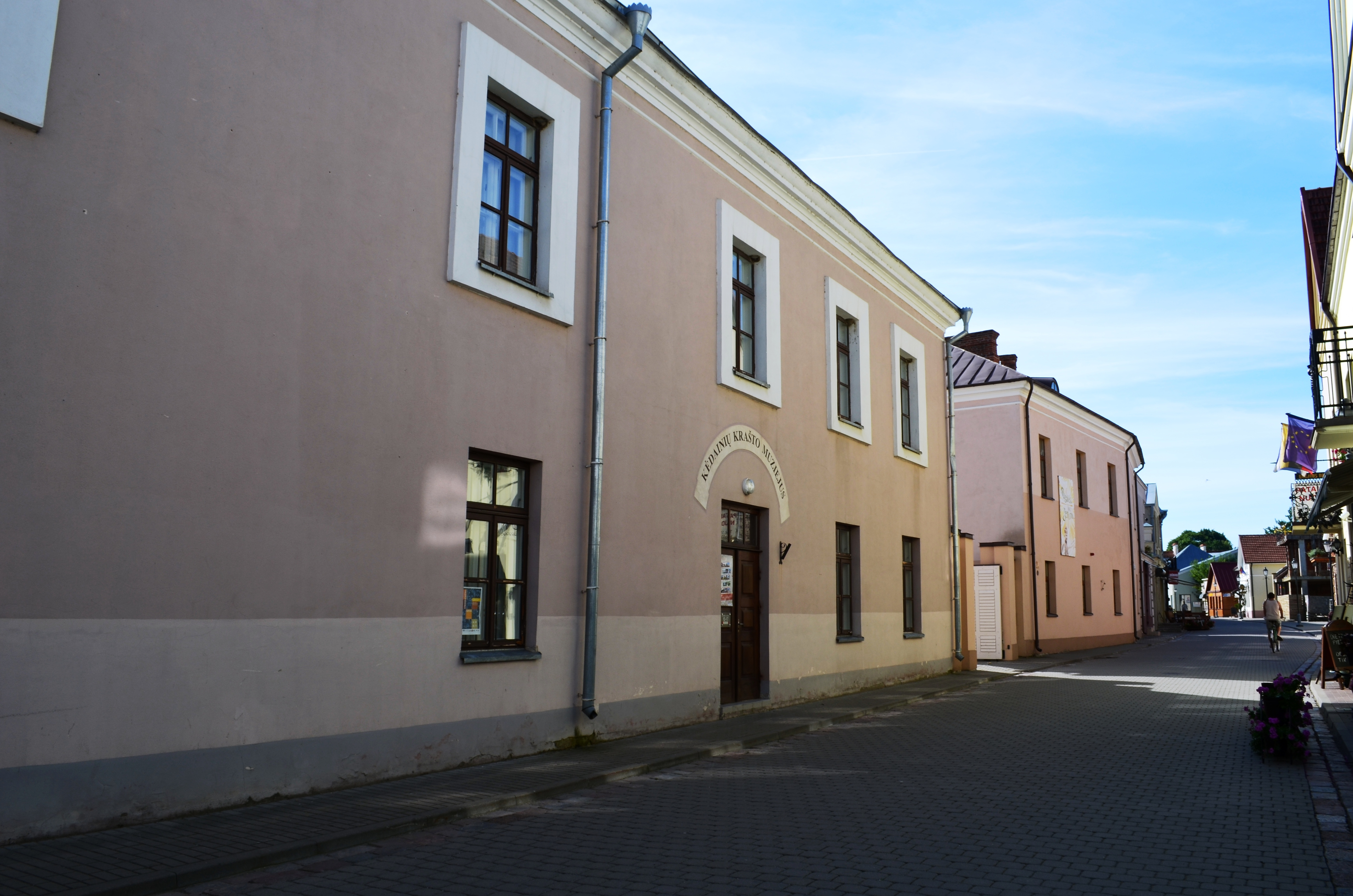
Kėdainiai Regional Museum

The Kėdainiai Regional Museum, established in 1922, now operates four branches: a Multicultural Centre, the mausoleum of the Dukes Radziwill, the house of Juozas Paukštelis, and the Museum of Wooden Sculptures of V.Ulevičius.

Since the city is known as the cucumber capital of Lithuania, it sponsors an annual cucumber festival.

In 2013, the band Bastille shot a music video for their single "Things We Lost in the Fire" in Kėdainiai.

A small Polish minority of 329 (0,61%) people live in Kėdainiai district municipality, but only 30 people participate in Stowarzyszenie Polaków Kiejdan (The Kėdainiai Polish Association), the elder people; their cultural activities involve public celebrations of Polish Day of Independence and Day of the Constitution of Third of May, as well as organizing a festival of Polish culture. Since 1994, the Kėdainiai Polish Language School operates here.

== Education ==
- Jonušas Radvila College (Kėdainių Jonušo Radvilos studijų centras)
- Kėdainiai Atžalynas gymnasium
- Kėdainiai Šviesioji gymnasium

== Sport ==
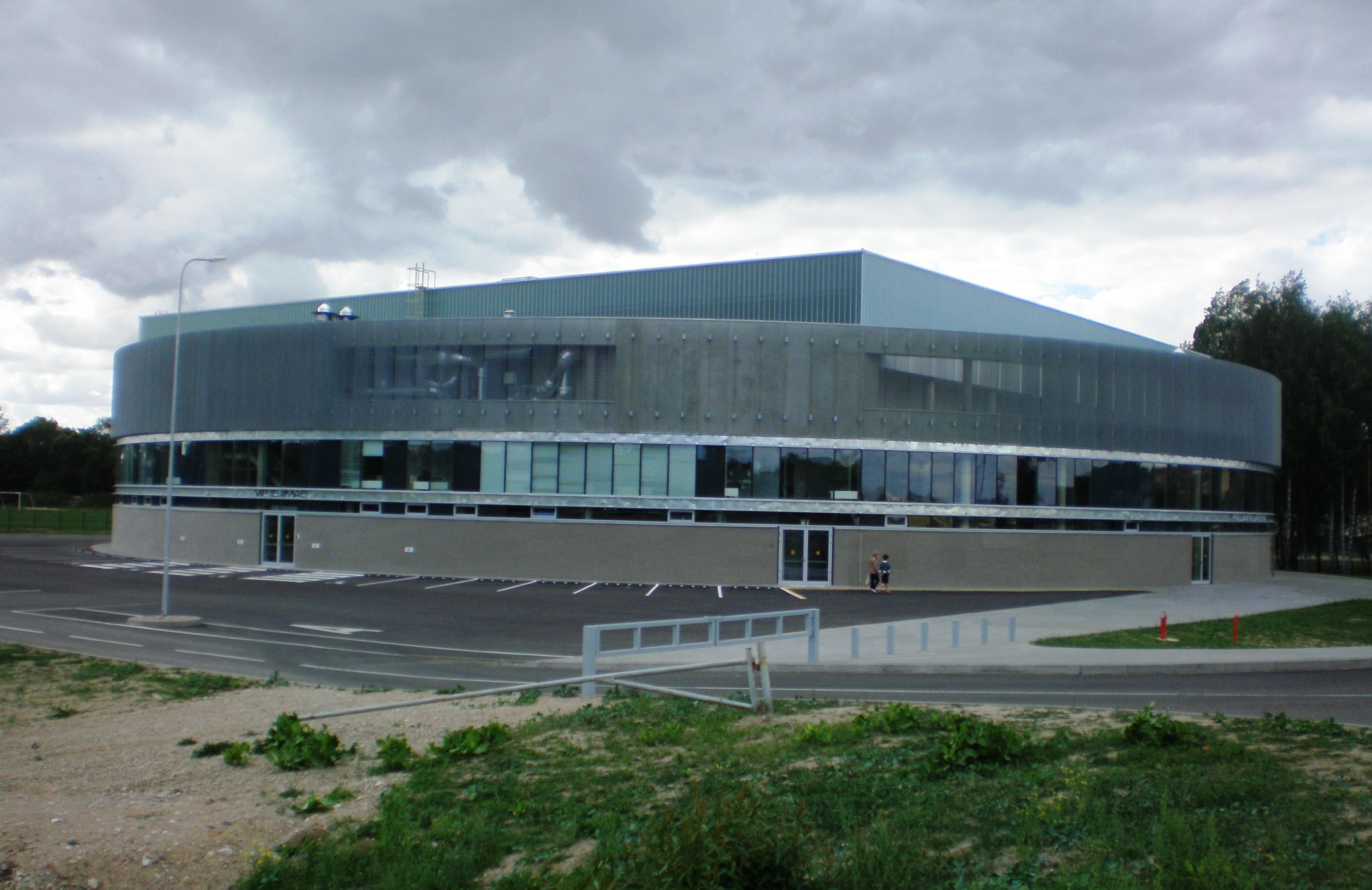
Kėdainiai Arena, home venue of the BC Nevėžis basketball club

Basketball club BC Nevėžis, which participate in Lithuanian basketball league. Football club FK Nevėžis, named after the nearby river plays in second-tier league I Lyga. Other football teams include FK Lifosa and FK Nevėžis-2, the reserve team of Nevėžis.

== Mayors of Kėdainiai ==
Mayor	Term of office		Political party
Mayor	Took office	Left office	Political party
Independent Lithuania
Petras Baguška	1990	1994	
Vigimantas Kisielius	1995	1997	Homeland Union
Viktoras Muntianas	1997	2004	Labour Party
Virginija Baltraitienė	12 November 2004	12 December 2005	Labour Party
Nijolė Naujokienė	2005	2011	Labour Party
Rimantas Diliūnas	2011	2015	Labour Party
Saulius Grinkevičius	17 April 2015	2019	Liberal Movement
Valentinas Tamulis	17 March 2019	Incumbent	Valentino Tamulio komanda – mūsų krašto sėkmei

== Notable citizens ==
- Janusz Radziwiłł (1612–1655) - Polish-Lithuanian nobleman, magnate
- Antanas Mackevičius, a priest and a leader of the 1863 uprising
- Czesław Miłosz, Polish writer, Nobel Prize winner. Born in Šeteniai village
- Mikalojus Daukša, Lithuanian writer, translator
- Martin (Moshe) Kagan, a leader of the anti-Nazi resistance group HaShomer HaTzair
- Ezekiel Katzenellenbogen, rabbi and prolific author
- Avrohom Eliyahu Kaplan (1890–1924), prominent Orthodox rabbi.
- Moshe Leib Lilienblum, Jewish scholar and author
- Viktoras Muntianas, Lithuanian politician, former Speaker of the Seimas
- Juozas Paukštelis, author
- Juozas Urbšys, Lithuanian diplomat. Born in Šeteniai village
- Shlomo Zalman Zoref, re-established the Ashkenazi community in the Old City of Jerusalem in 1811
- Bernard G Richards (b. March 9, 1877 Dov-Gershon Rabinovich in Keidan, Lithuania - d. 25 June 1971 in the US) author and Jewish leader.

== Twin towns – sister cities ==
Kėdainiai is twinned with:

- Brodnica, Poland
- Fălticeni, Romania
- Kohtla-Järve, Estonia
- Łobez, Poland
- Melitopol, Ukraine
- Sömmerda, Germany
- Svalöv, Sweden
- (Georgia (country)) Telavi, Georgia

== Gallery ==
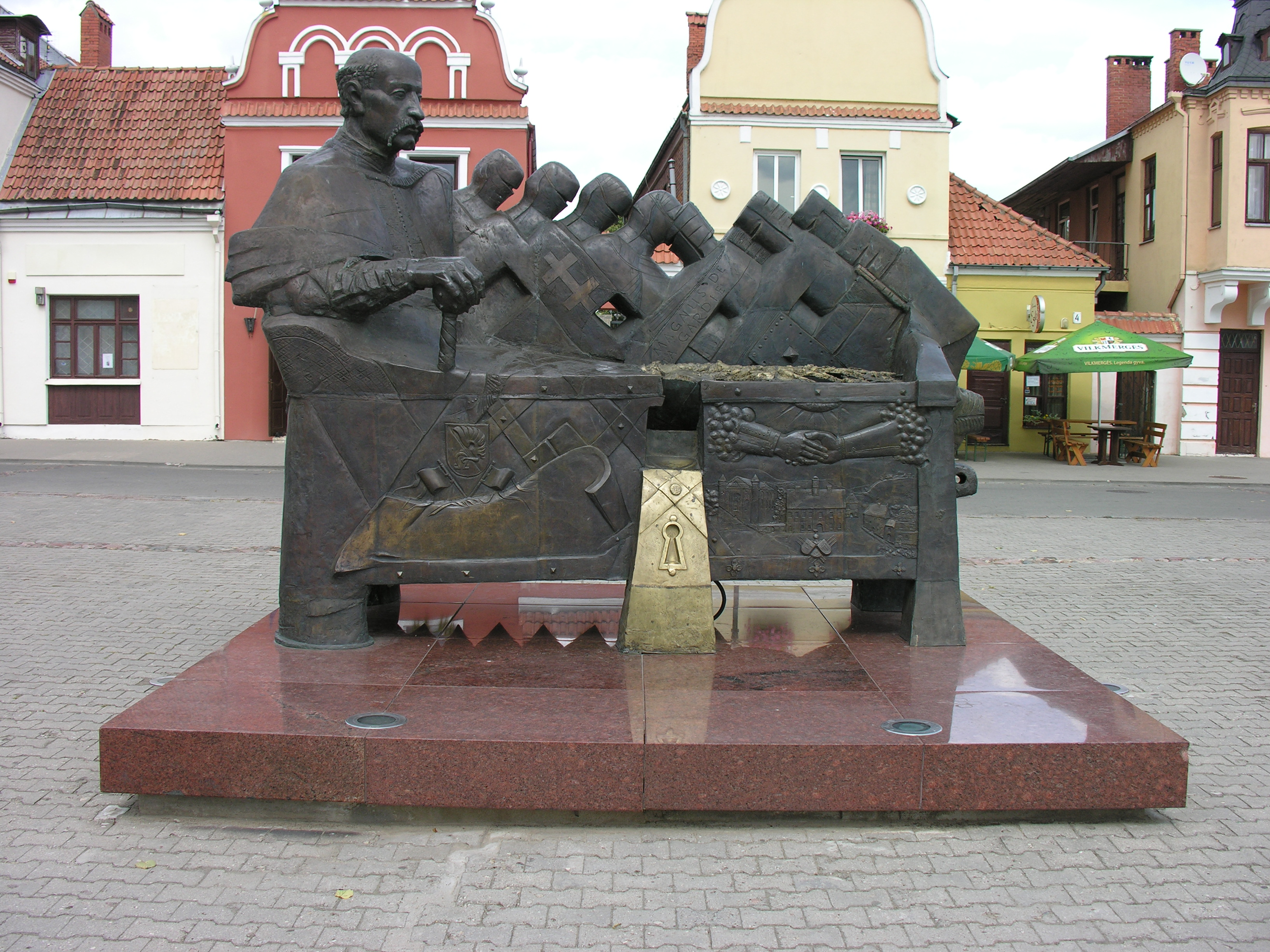
Monument of Janusz Radziwiłł

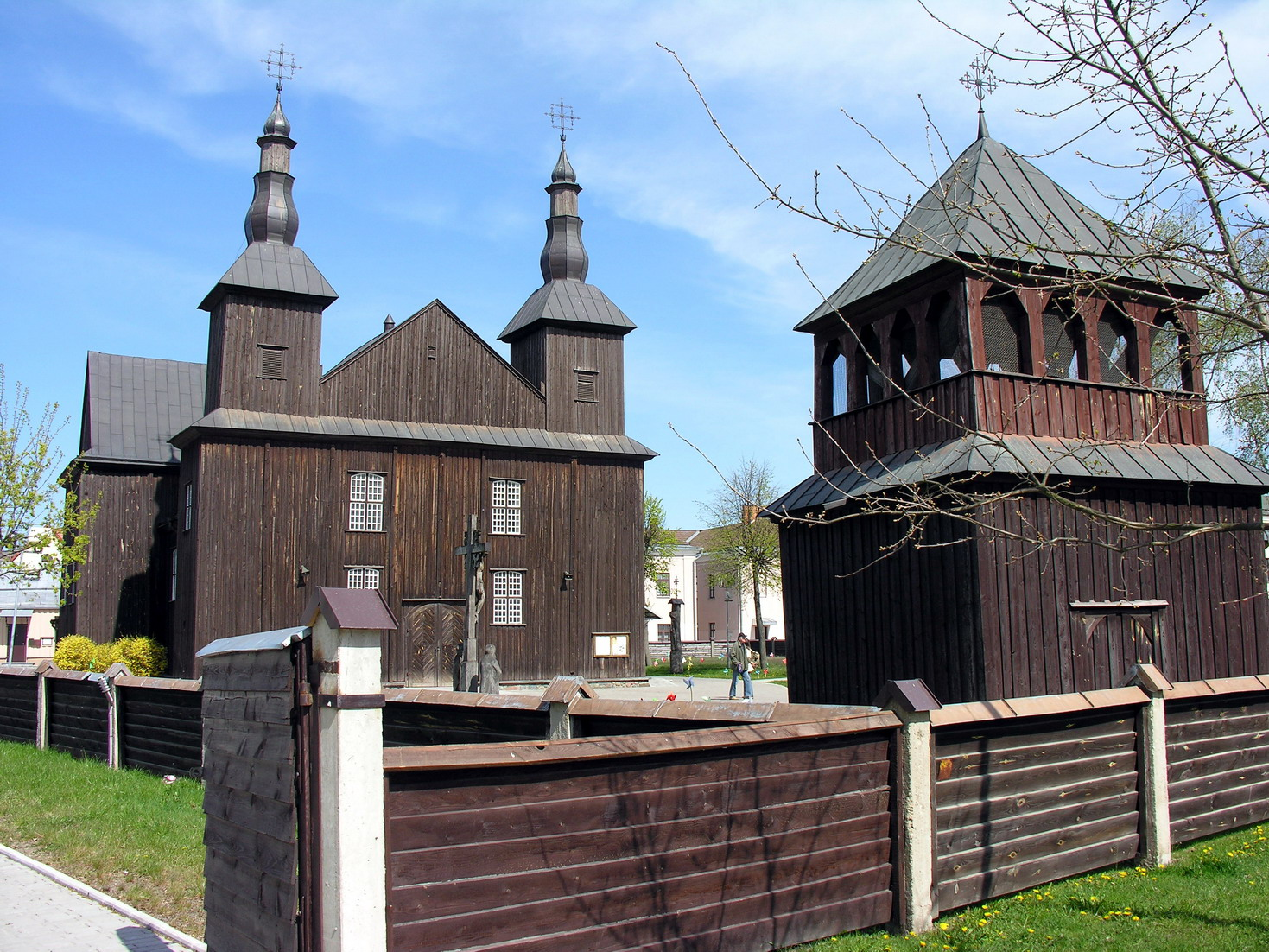
Catholic Church of St. Joseph and its belfry

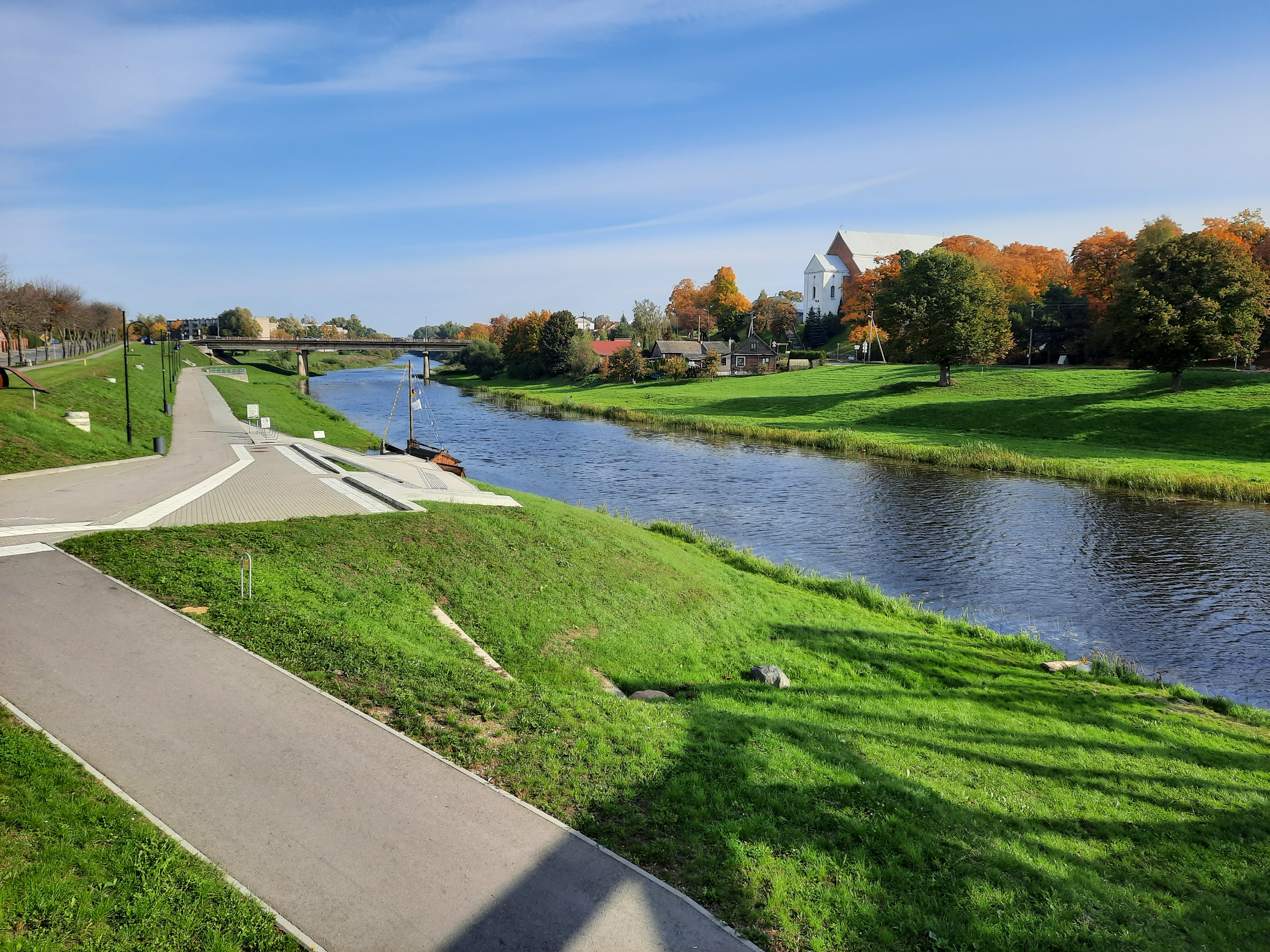
Nevėžis river flowing through Kėdainiai

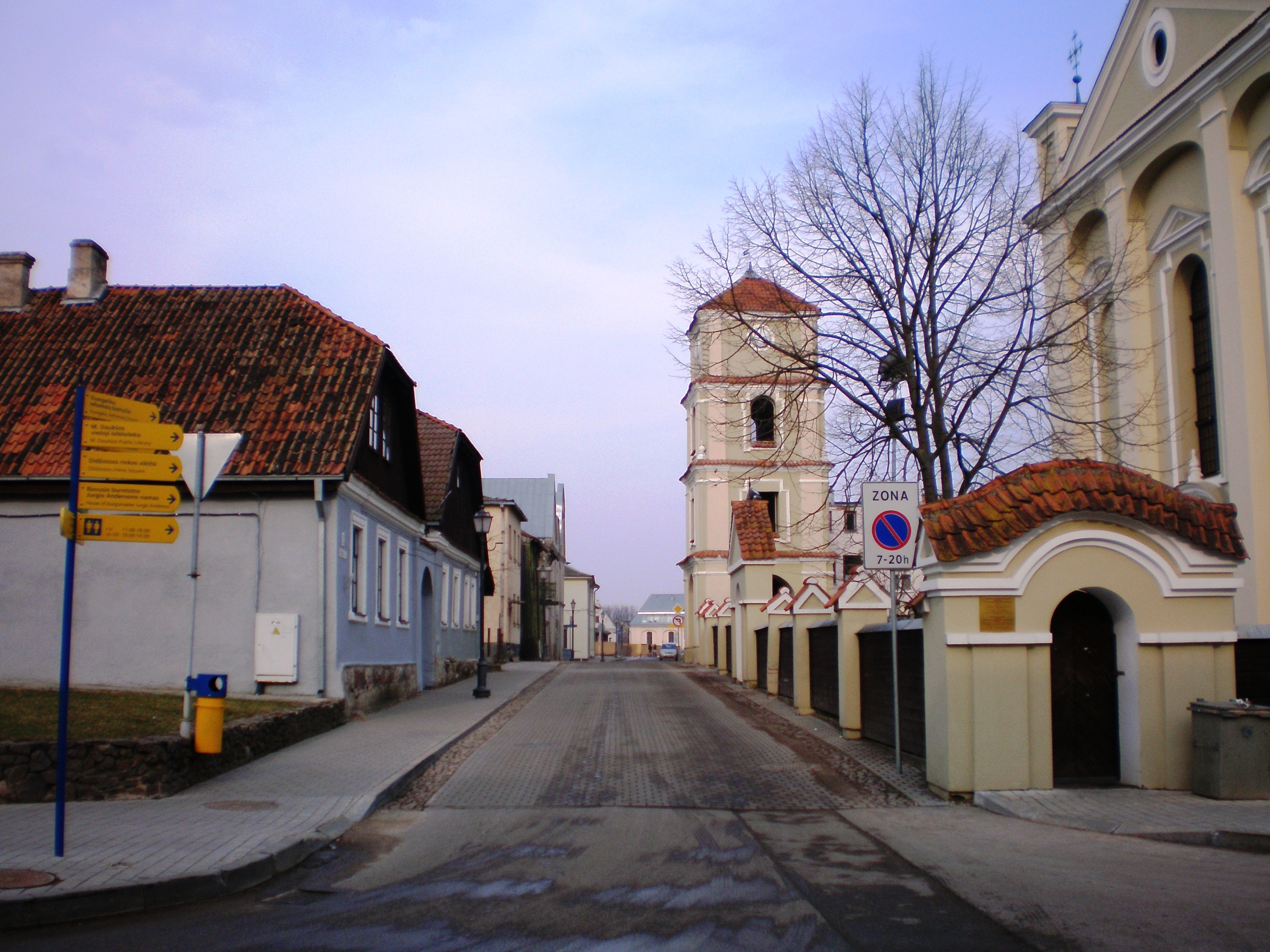
Senoji Street in the old town

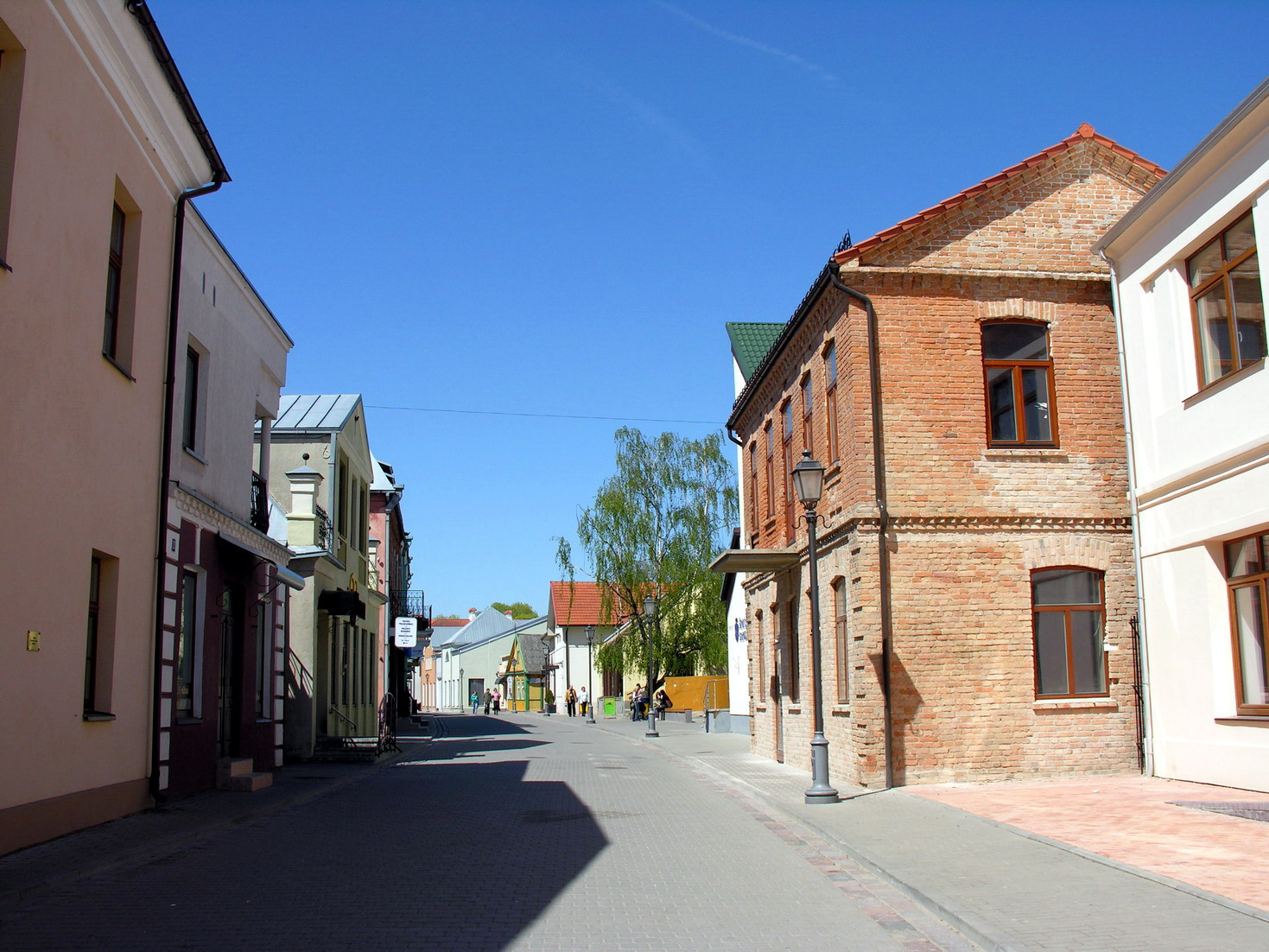
Kėdainiai Old Town

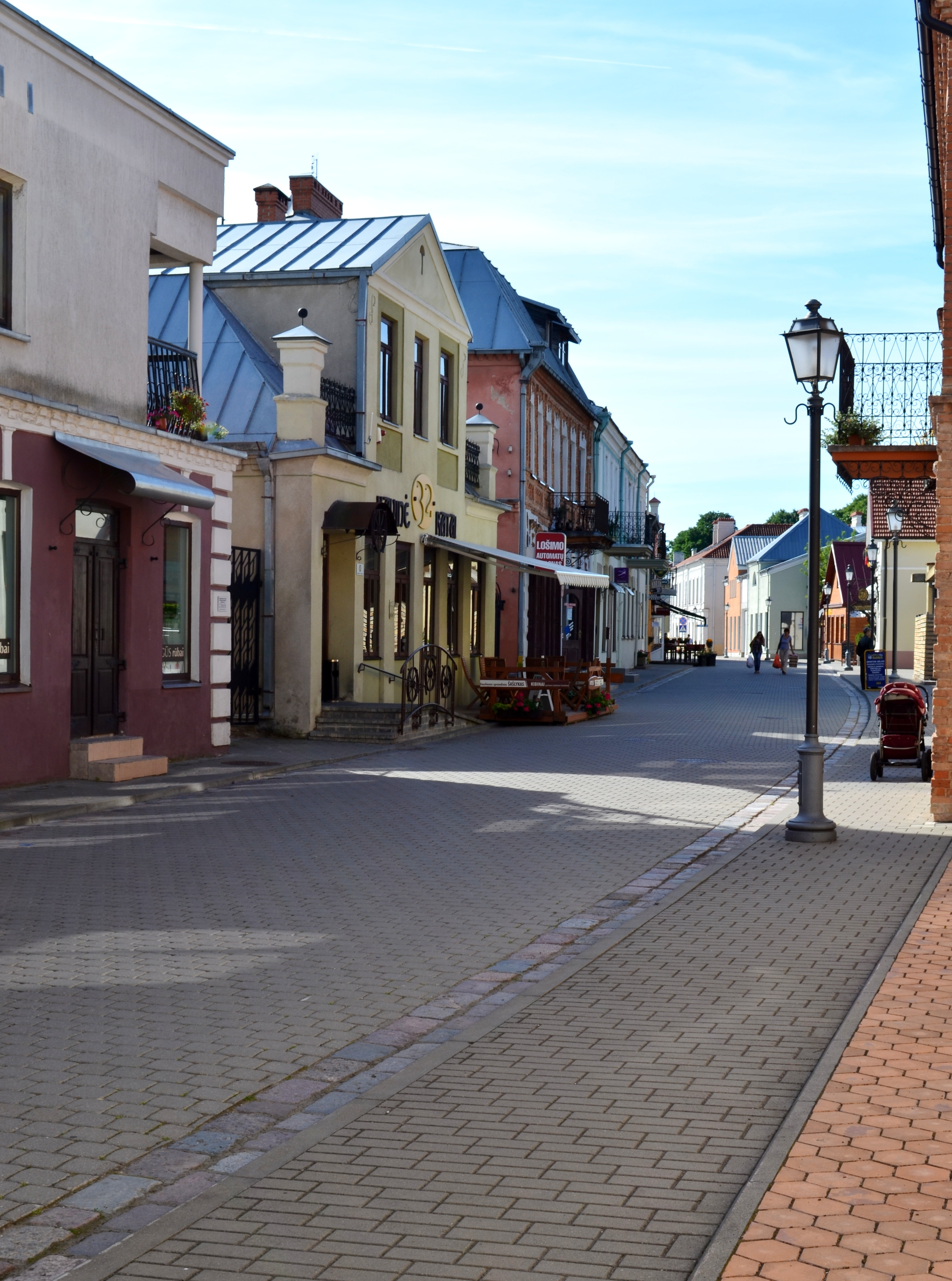
Kėdainiai Old Town

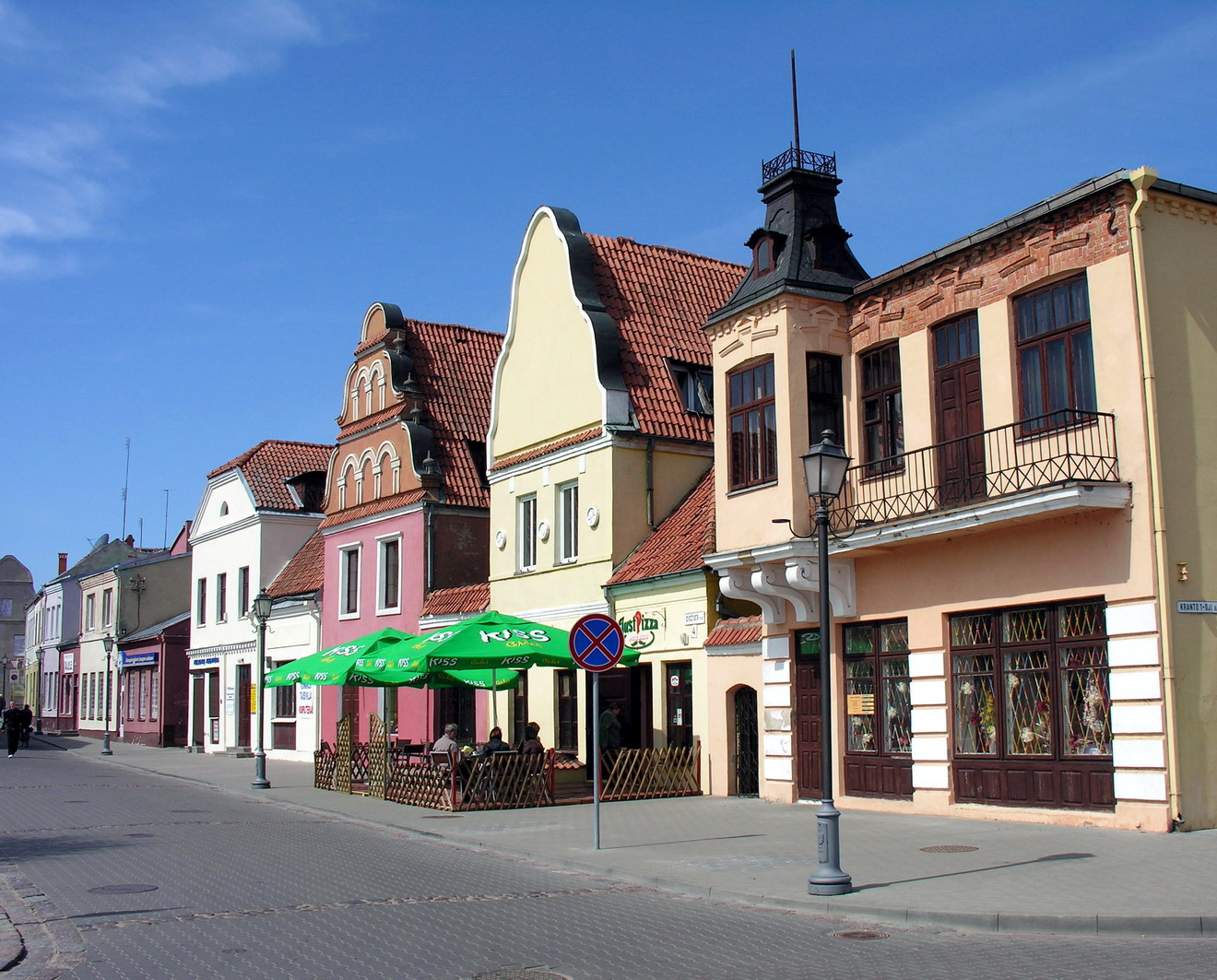
Didžioji street

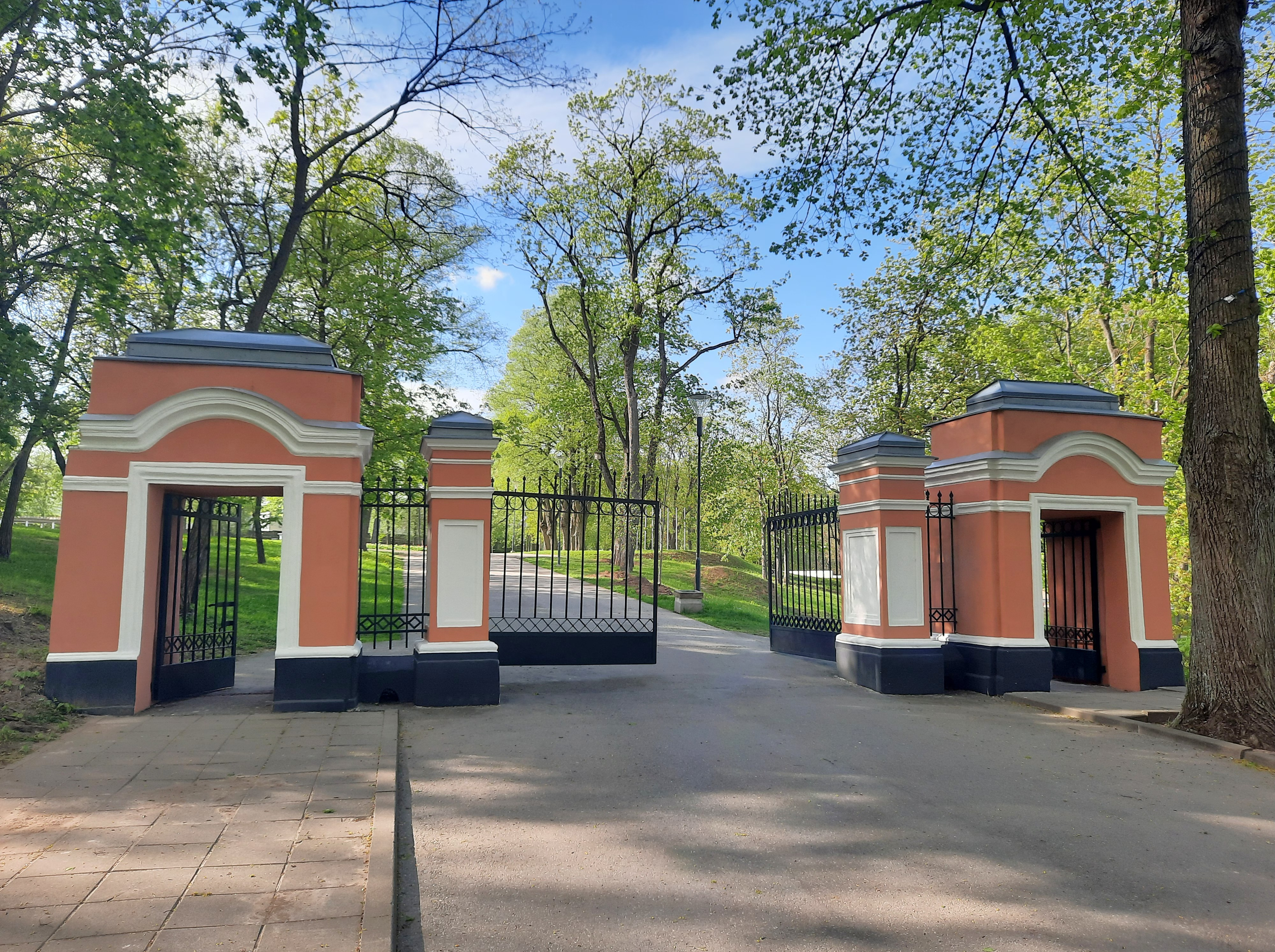
Park

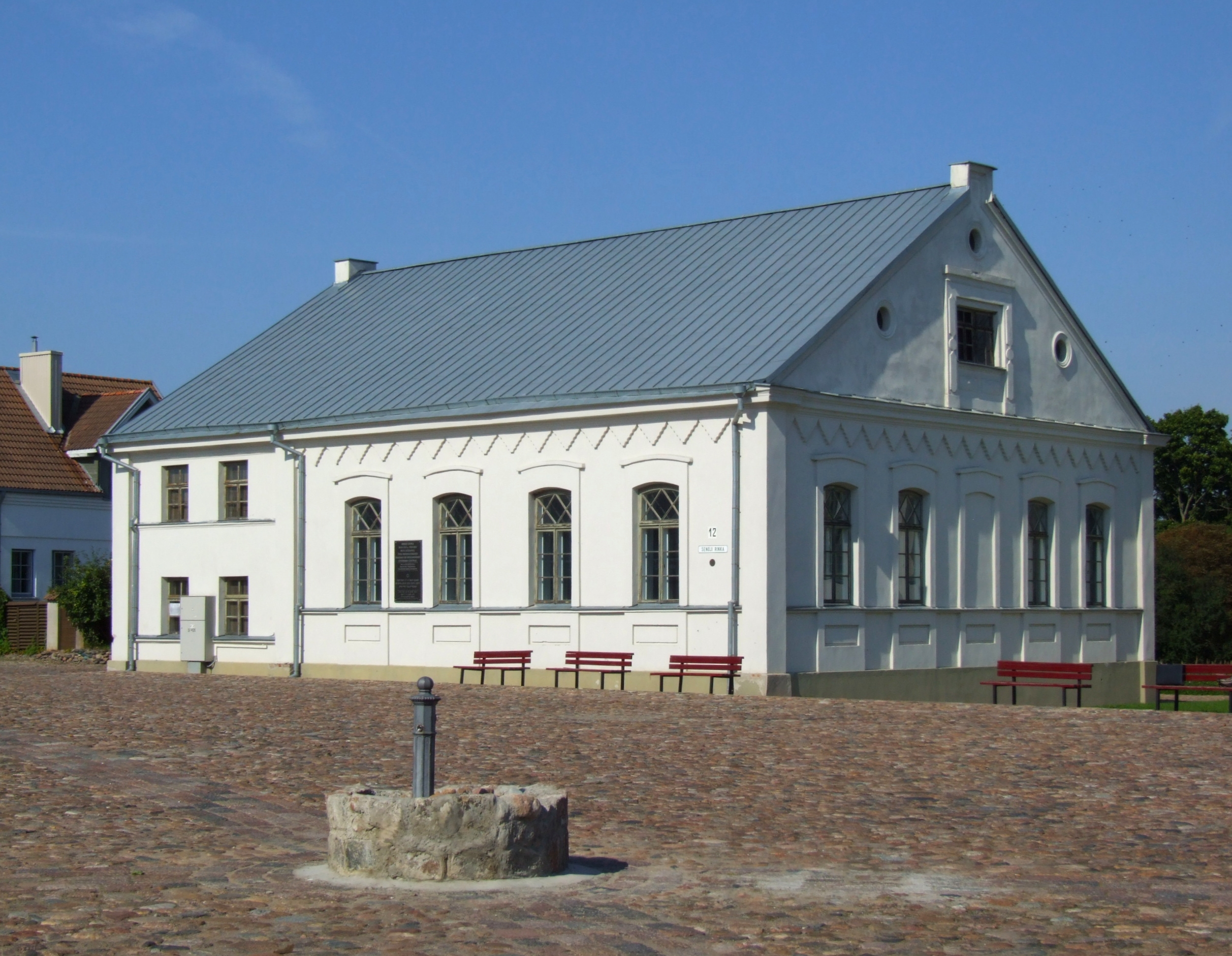
Kėdainiai new synagogue

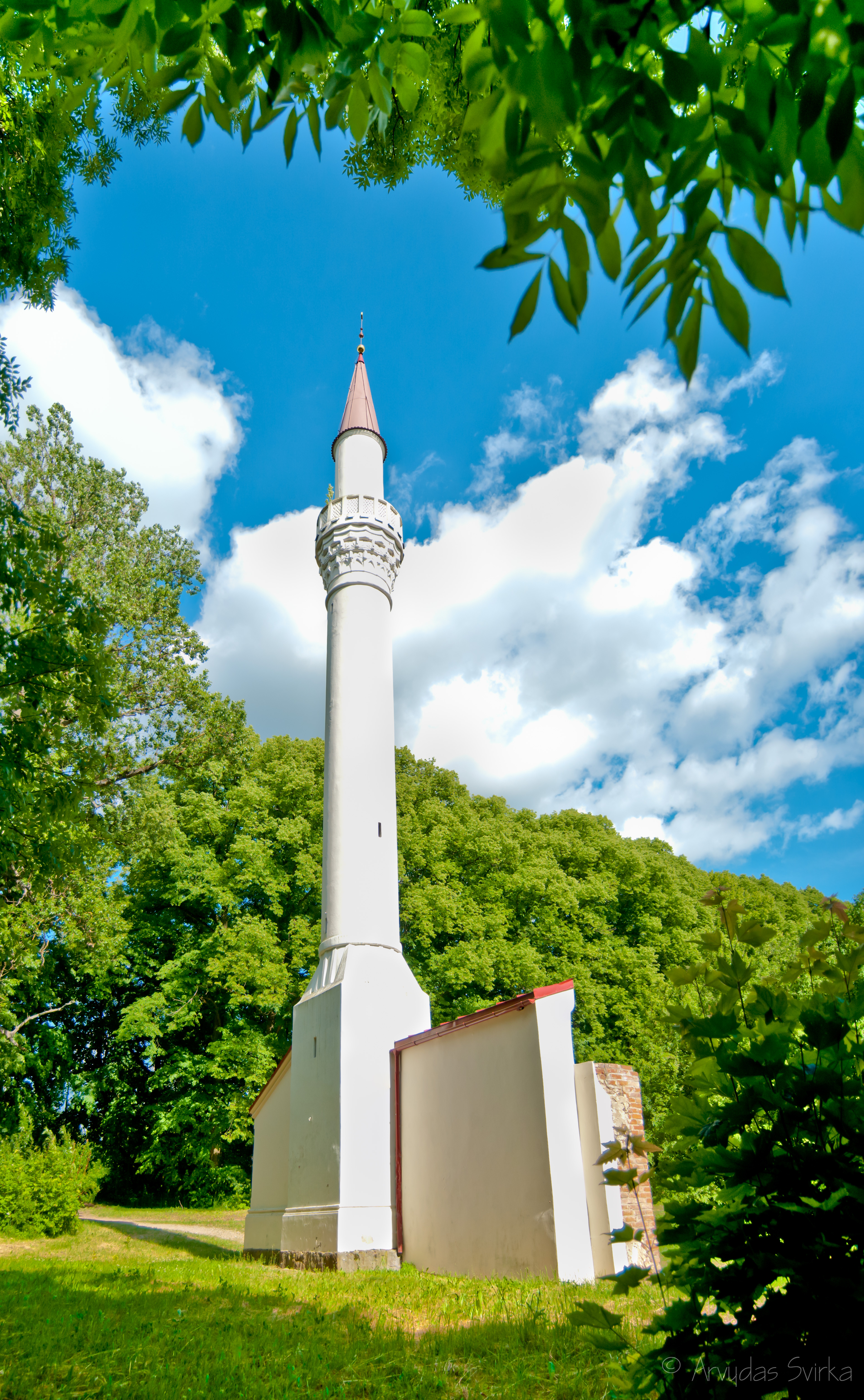
Kėdainiai minaret

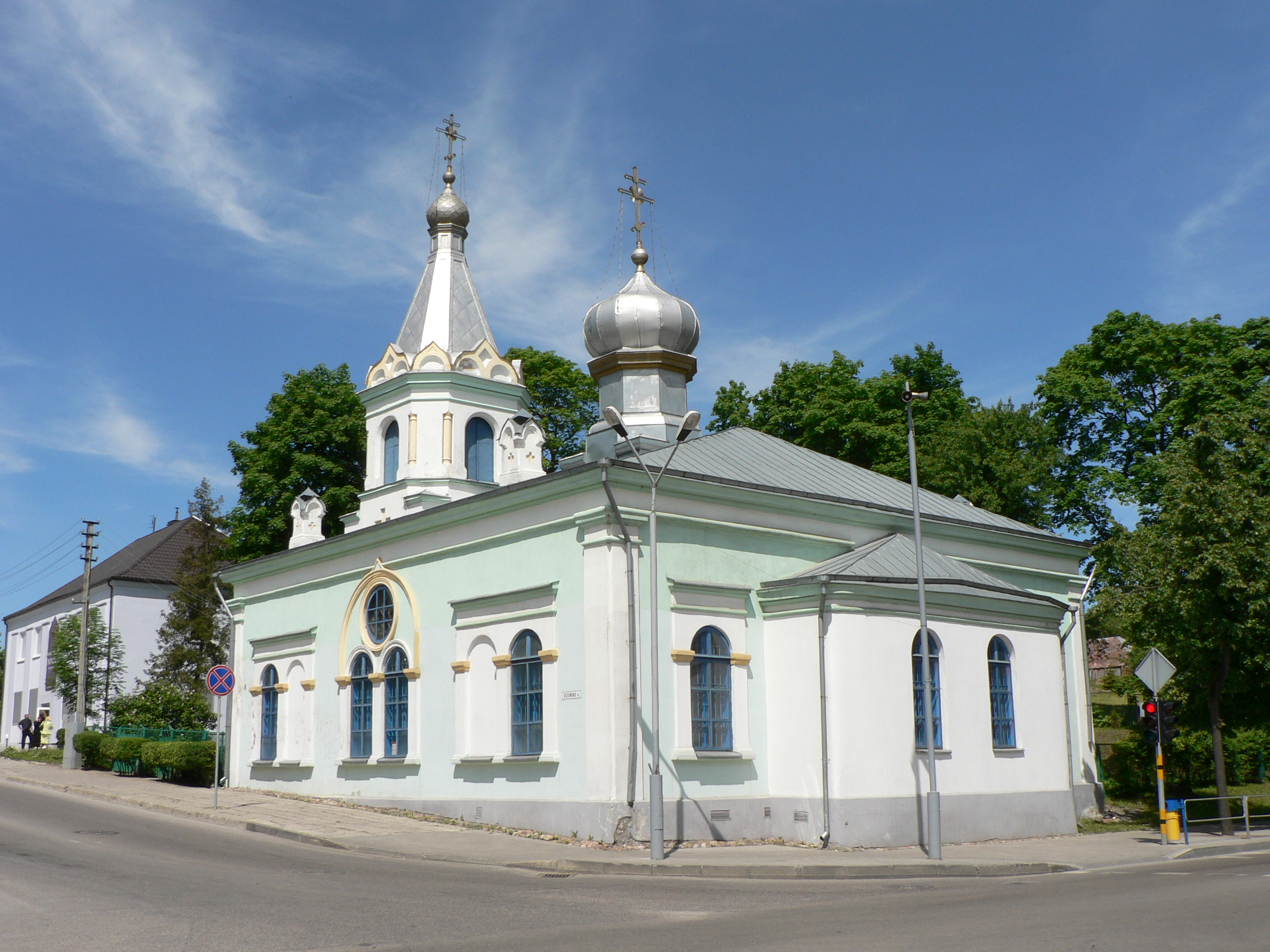
Holy Transfiguration Church

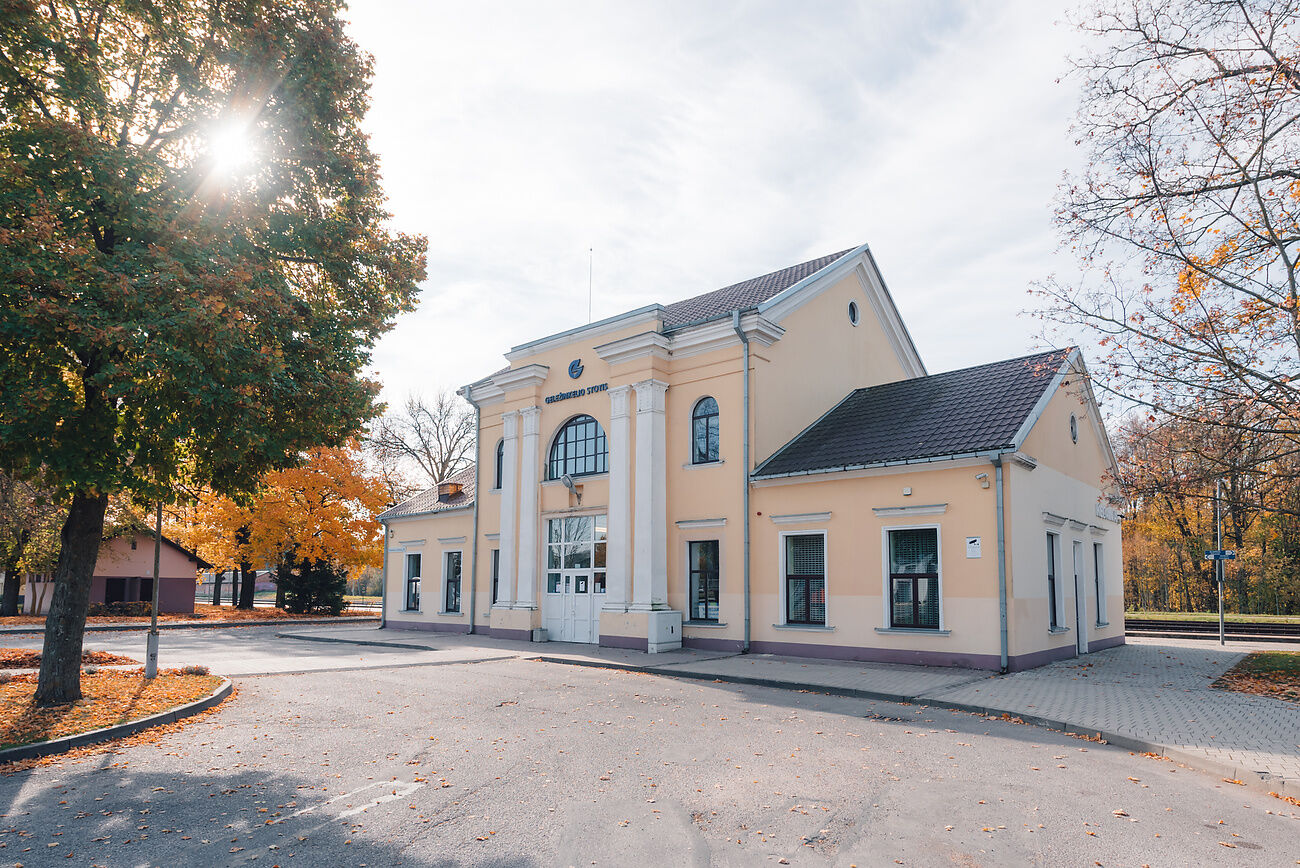
Kėdainiai railway station
