= Rimkai Lake =

Lake in Lithuania

Rimkai
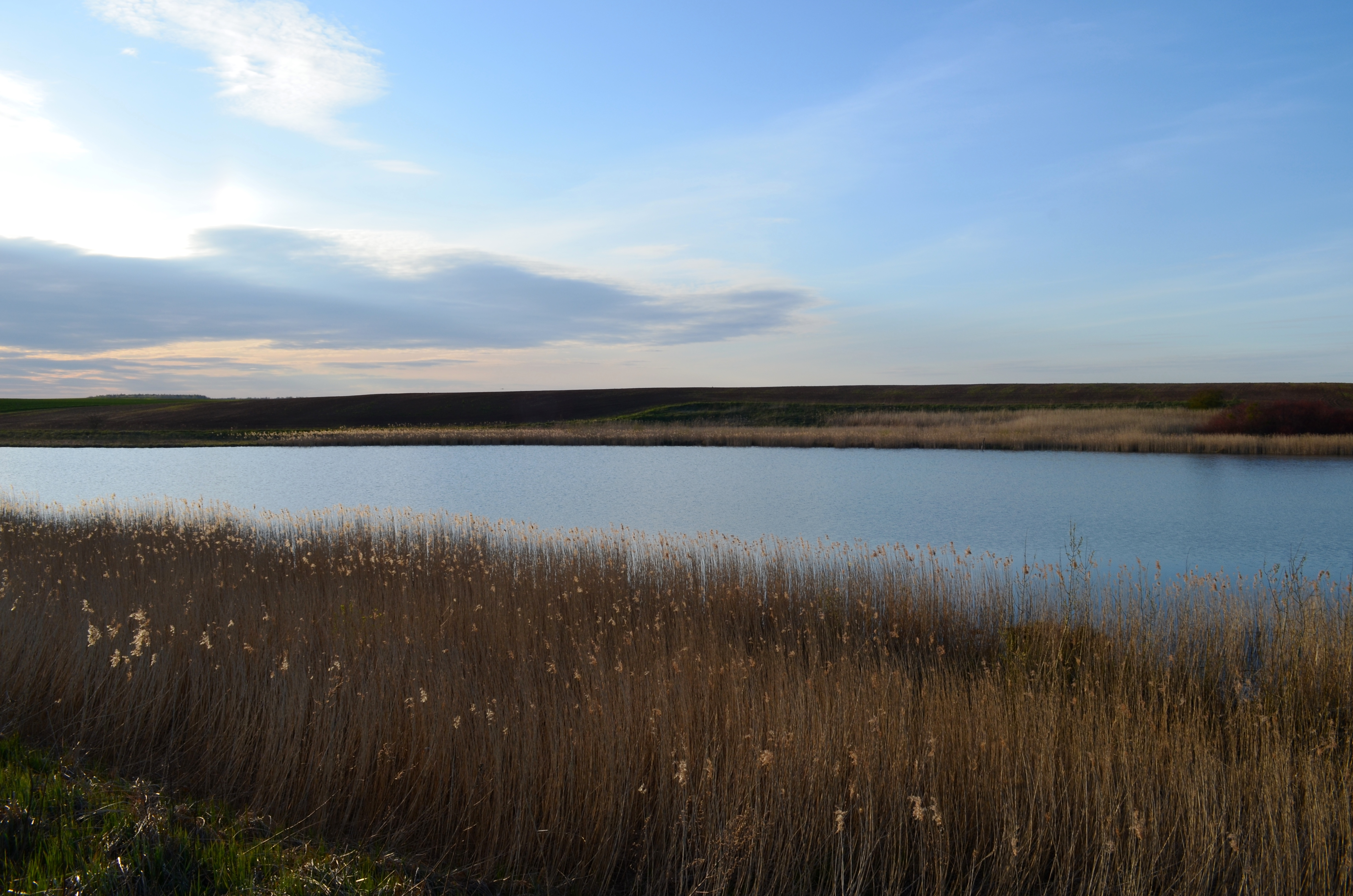
- Rimkai Lake from the southern coast

- Location within Lithuania Location within Kėdainiai District Municipality
- Location: Kėdainiai District Municipality, Lithuania
- Coordinates: 55°26′30″N 23°43′50″E
- Part of: Jaugila→Smilga→ Nevėžis→ Neman→ Baltic Sea
- Max. length: 0.33 km (0.21 mi)
- Max. width: 0.12 km (0.075 mi)
- Surface area: 0.029 km^{2} (0.011 sq mi)
- Shore length^{1}: 0.8 km (0.50 mi)
- Surface elevation: 89.3 m (293 ft)
- ^{1} Shore length is not a well-defined measure.

The Rimkai is a lake in Krakės Eldership, Kėdainiai District Municipality, central Lithuania. It is located 4 kilometres (2.5 mi) to the north from Krakės town, next to Jaugiliai village and Jaugiliai Lake, at a place of former Rimkai village. It belongs to the Smilga basin (part of the Nevėžis basin).

Coasts of the lake are flat, covered by reed beds.

The name Rimkai comes from the village name Rimkai.

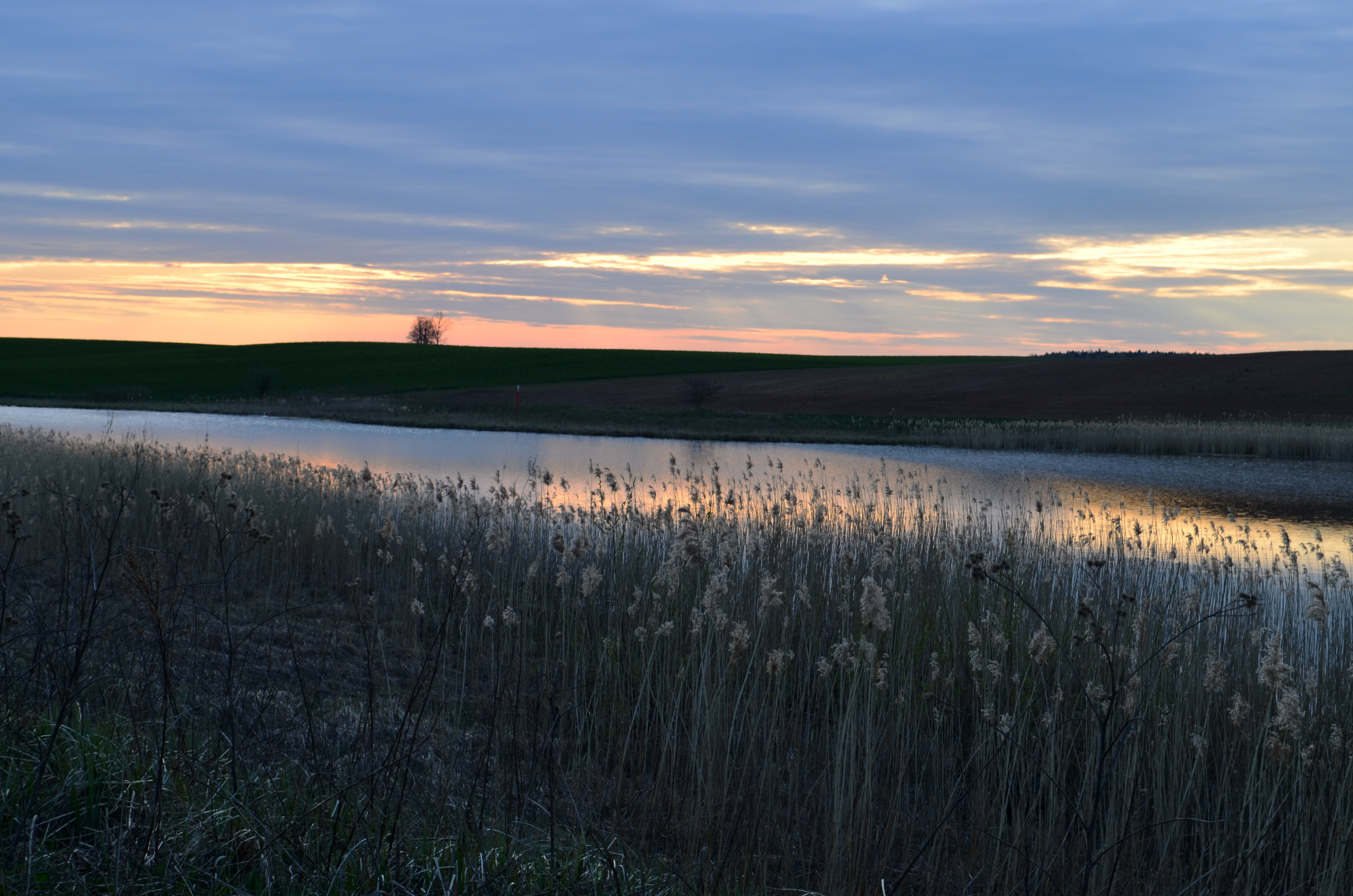
Rimkai Lake at the evening time
