= Graisupis =

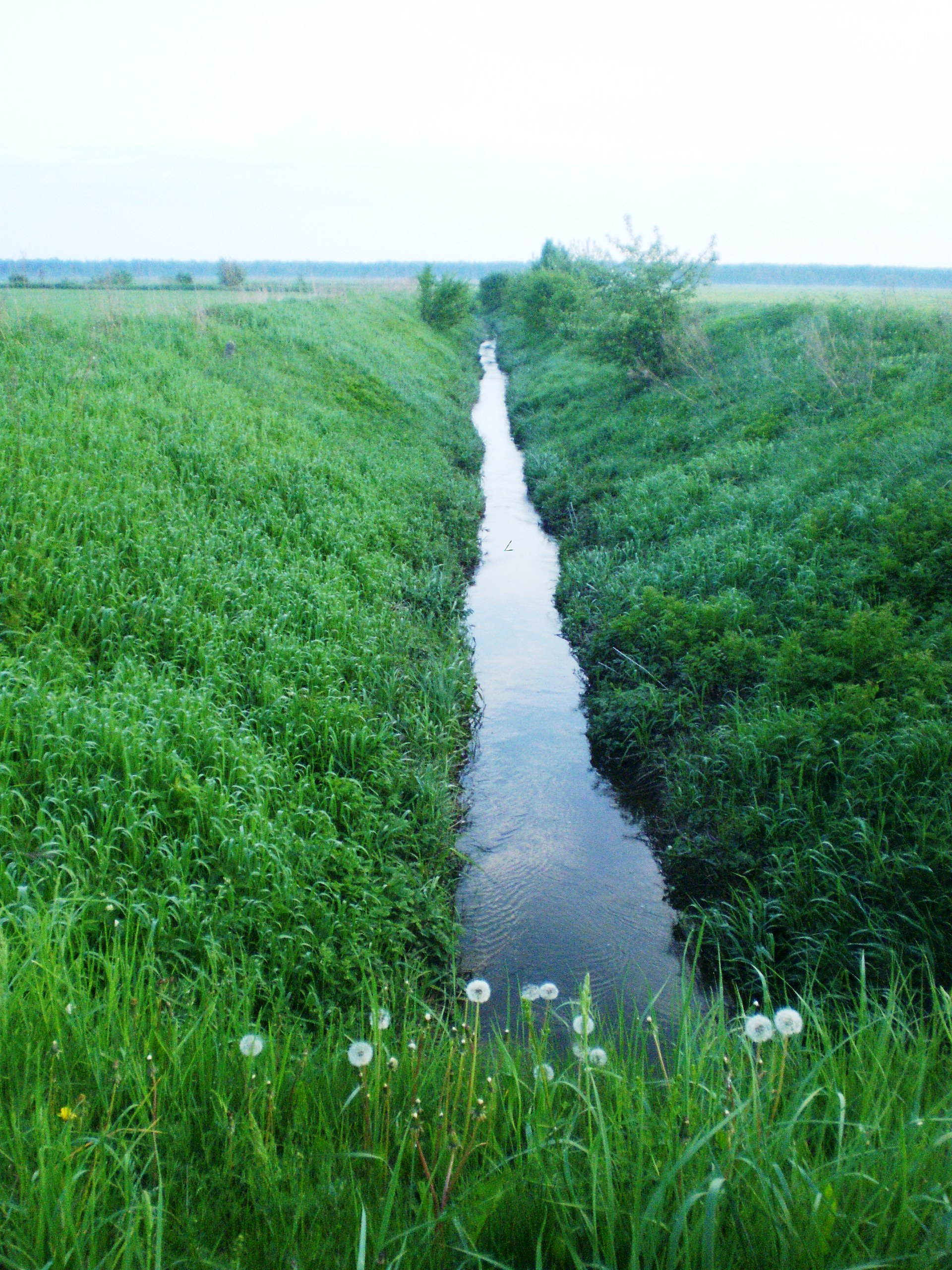
- Graisupis from the road Kėdainiai–Krakės

Location
- Country: Lithuania
- Region: Kėdainiai district municipality, Kaunas County

Physical characteristics
- Source
  - location: Krakės-Dotnuva forest nearby Palainiškiai
- Mouth: Smilga nearby Lipliūnai
  - coordinates: 55°18′9″N 23°51′17″E
- Length: 8.2 km (5.1 mi)
- Basin size: 16.6 km^{2} (6.4 sq mi)

Basin features
- Progression: Smilga→ Nevėžis→ Neman→ Baltic Sea

The Graisupis is a river of Kėdainiai district municipality, Kaunas County, central Lithuania. It flows for 8.2 kilometres (5.1 mi).

It originates at the edge of the Krakės-Dotnuva forest nearby Palainiškiai, then flows to the southeast till it meets the Smilga (from the left side) nearby Lipliūnai. All the course is channalised.

The name Graisupis possibly comes from Lithuanian verb greisti ('to become quicker').
