= Jaugiliai Lake =

Lake in Lithuania

Jaugiliai
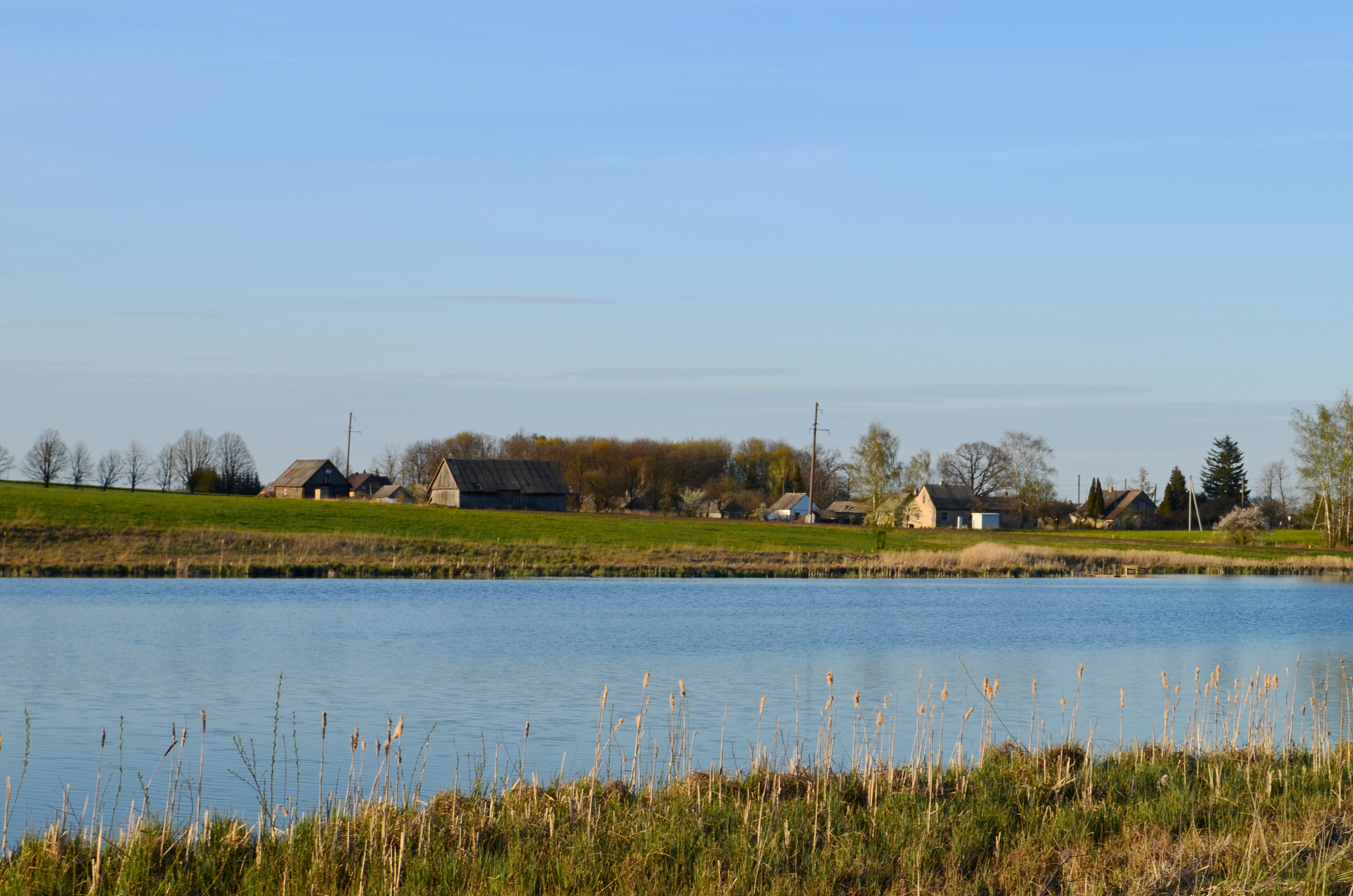
- Jaugiliai Lake and village

- Location within Lithuania Location within Kėdainiai District Municipality
- Location: Kėdainiai District Municipality, Lithuania
- Coordinates: 55°26′35″N 23°44′13″E
- Part of: Smilga→ Nevėžis→ Neman→ Baltic Sea
- Primary inflows: Jaugila
- River sources: Jaugila
- Max. length: 0.4 km (0.25 mi)
- Max. width: 0.1 km (0.062 mi)
- Surface area: 0.037 km^{2} (0.014 sq mi)
- Shore length^{1}: 0.9 km (0.56 mi)
- Surface elevation: 88.8 m (291 ft)
- Settlements: Jaugiliai
- ^{1} Shore length is not a well-defined measure.

The Jaugiliai (or Jaugėliai) is a lake in Krakės Eldership, Kėdainiai District Municipality, central Lithuania. It is located 4 kilometres (2.5 mi) to the north from Krakės town, at Jaugiliai village. It belongs to the Smilga basin (part of the Nevėžis basin) as the Smilga's tributary the Jaugila passes through the lake.

Coasts of the lake are flat, swampy. Nearby the western end of the lake another Rimkai Lake is located.

The name Jaugiliai comes from the village name Jaugiliai.

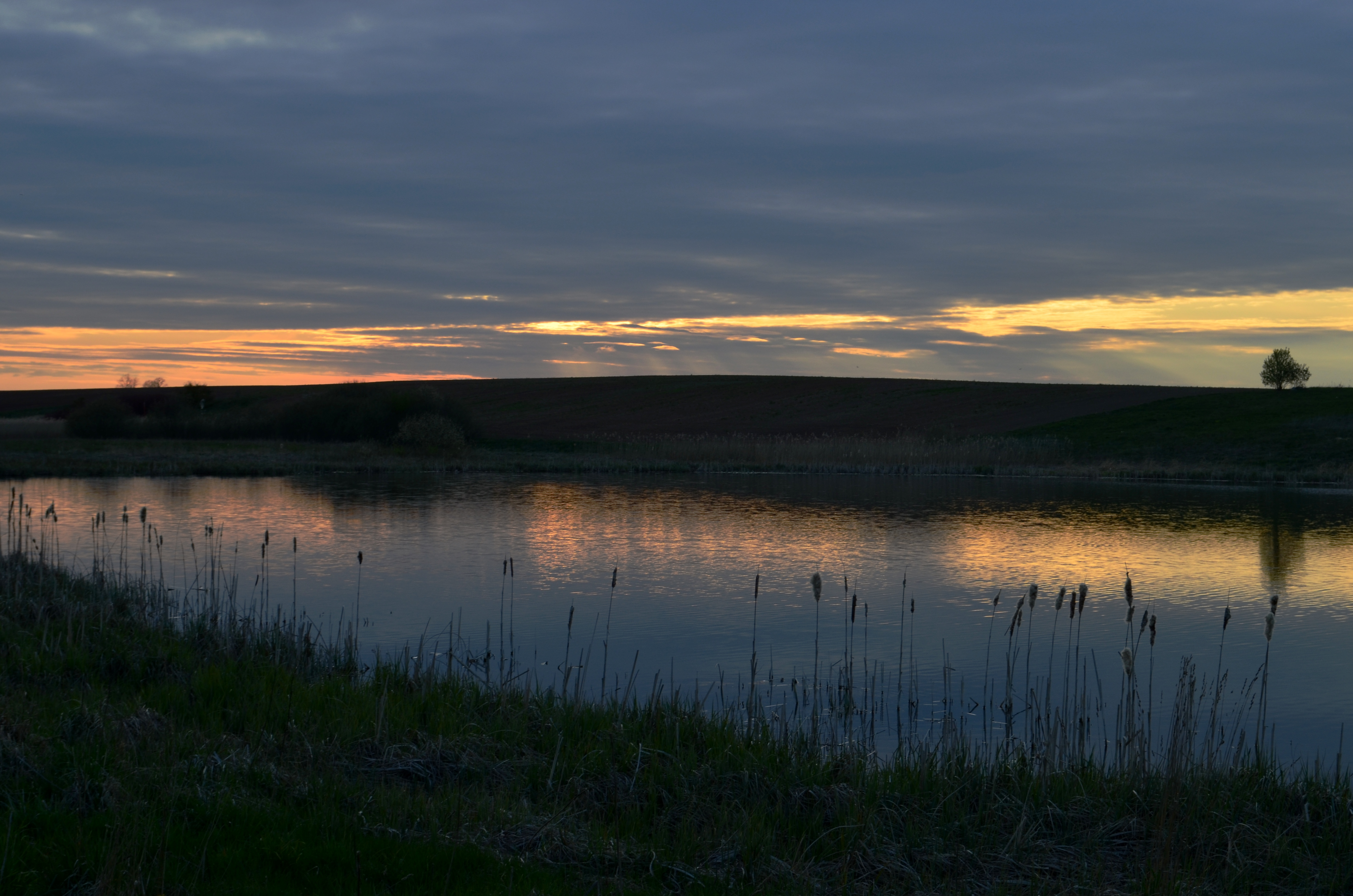
Jaugiliai Lake at the evening time
