= Klamputis =

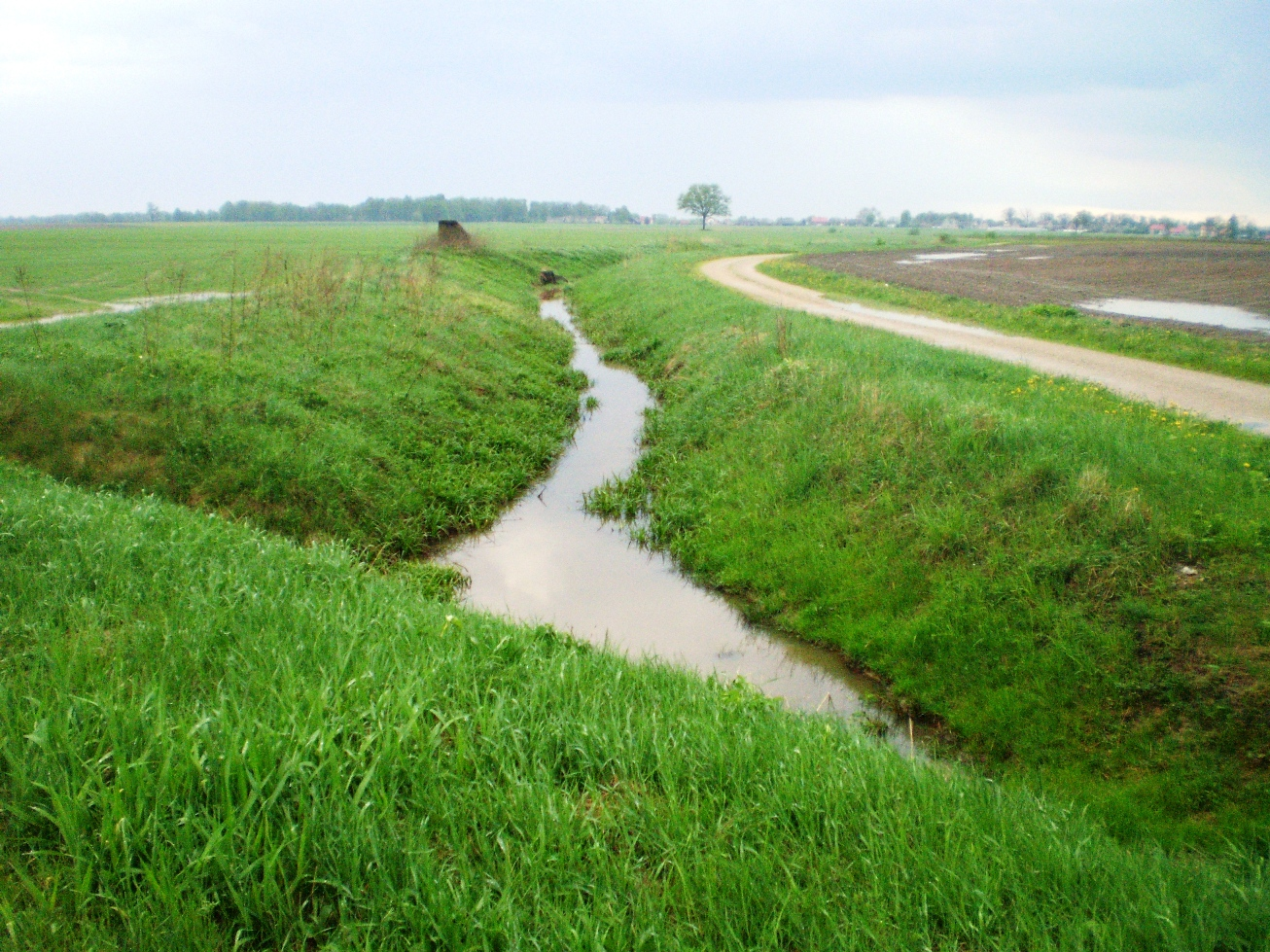

Location
- Country: Lithuania
- Region: Kėdainiai district municipality, Kaunas County

Physical characteristics
- Source
  - location: Varėnai village
- Mouth: Smilga in Bartkūniškiai
  - coordinates: 55°18′13″N 23°56′8″E
- Length: 4.1 km (2.5 mi)
- Basin size: 5.5 km^{2} (2.1 sq mi)

Basin features
- Progression: Smilga→ Nevėžis→ Neman→ Baltic Sea

The Klamputis is a river of Kėdainiai district municipality, Kaunas County, central Lithuania. It originates in Varėnai village, on the edge of Kėdainiai and flows for 4.1 kilometres (2.5 mi) till the confluence with the Smilga (from the right side) in Bartkūniškiai.

Two little ponds are on the lower flow of the Klamputis. The river passes through Varėnai, Tubiai and Bartkūniškiai villages.

The name Klamputis comes from Lithuanian klampus ('slimy, sloughy').

== Images ==
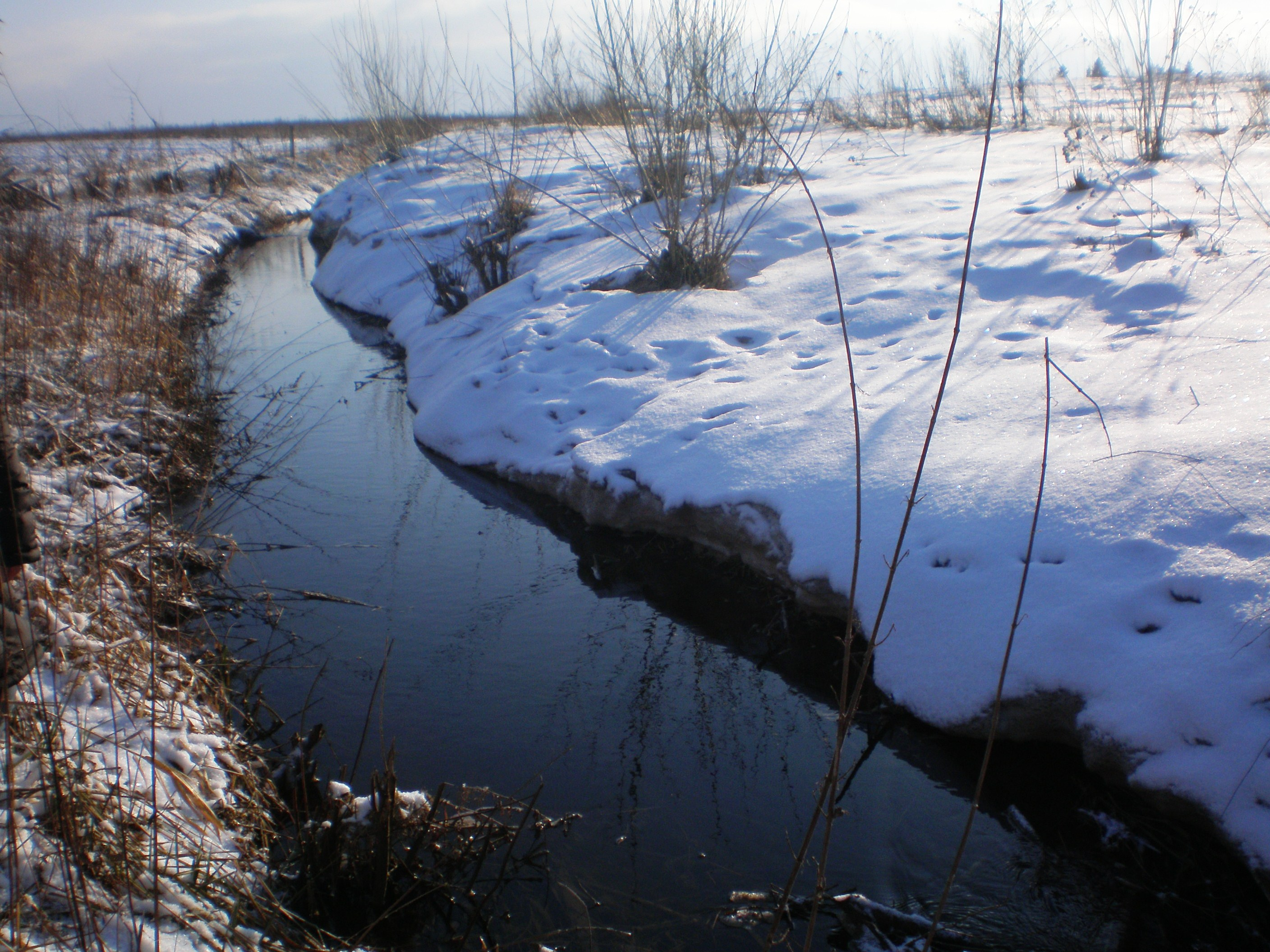
Klamputis middle course in winter

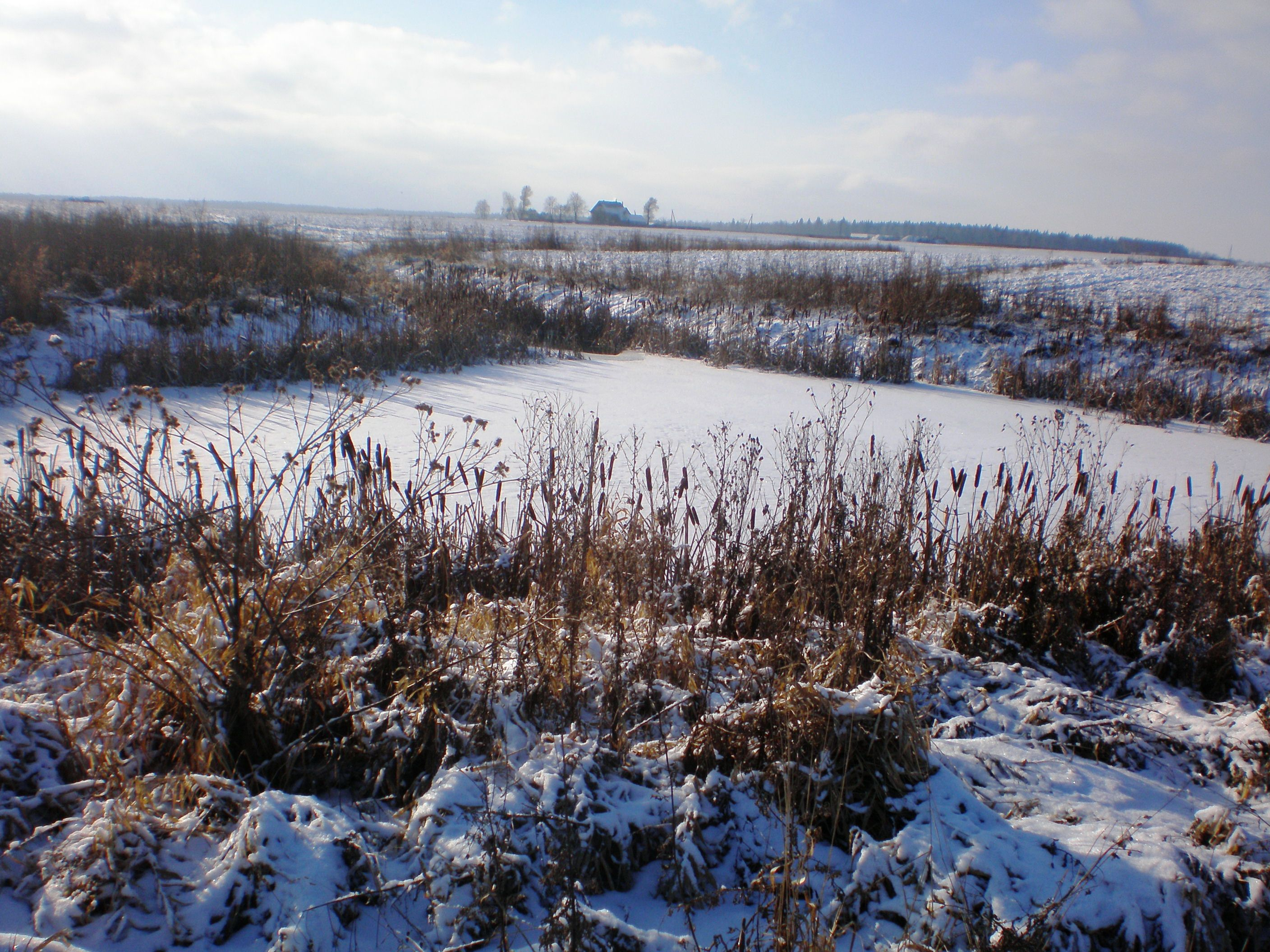
A confluence of Klamputis and unnamed rivulet

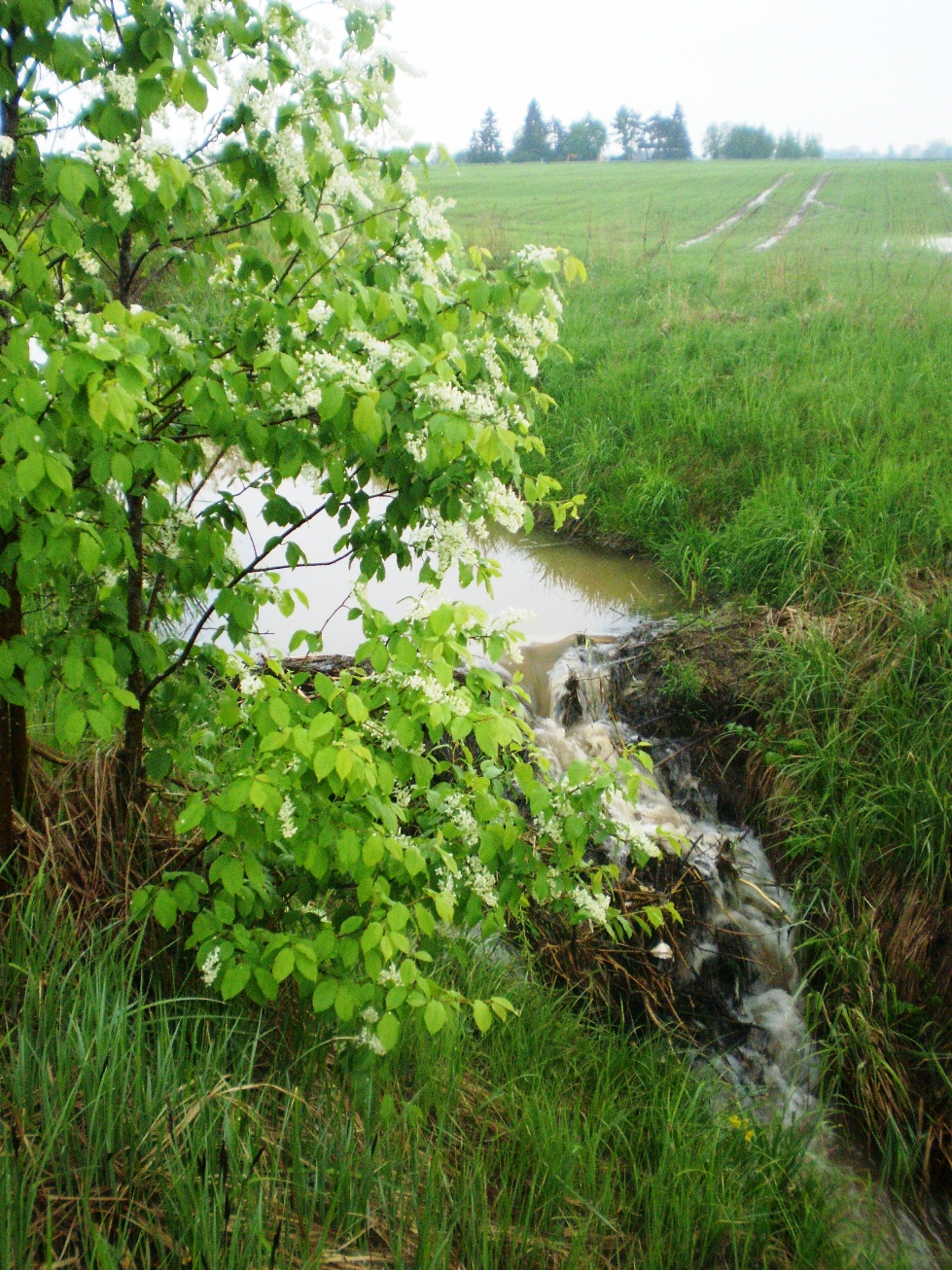
Beaver dam

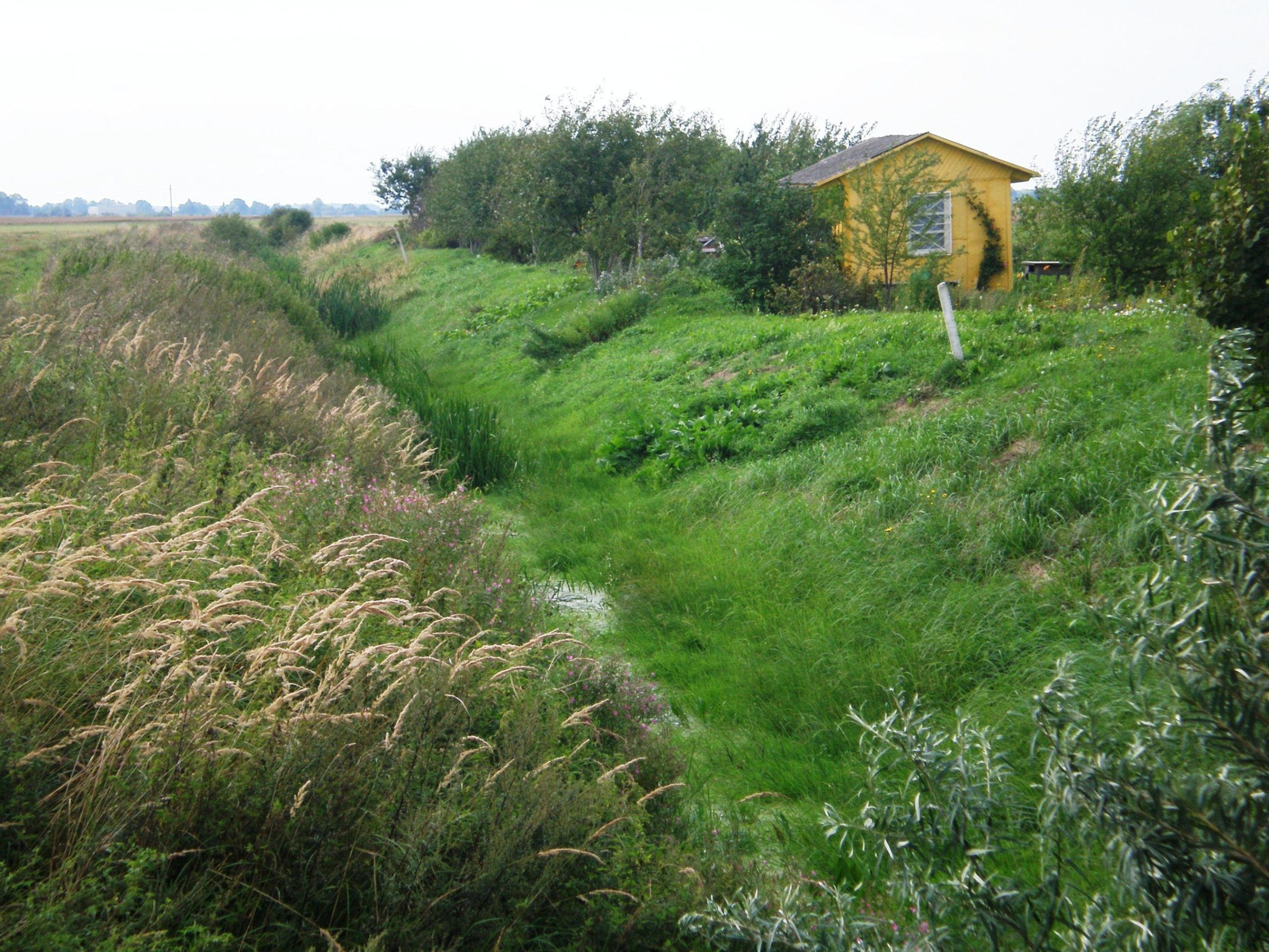
Klamputis by Varėnai
