= Girynė =

- Village
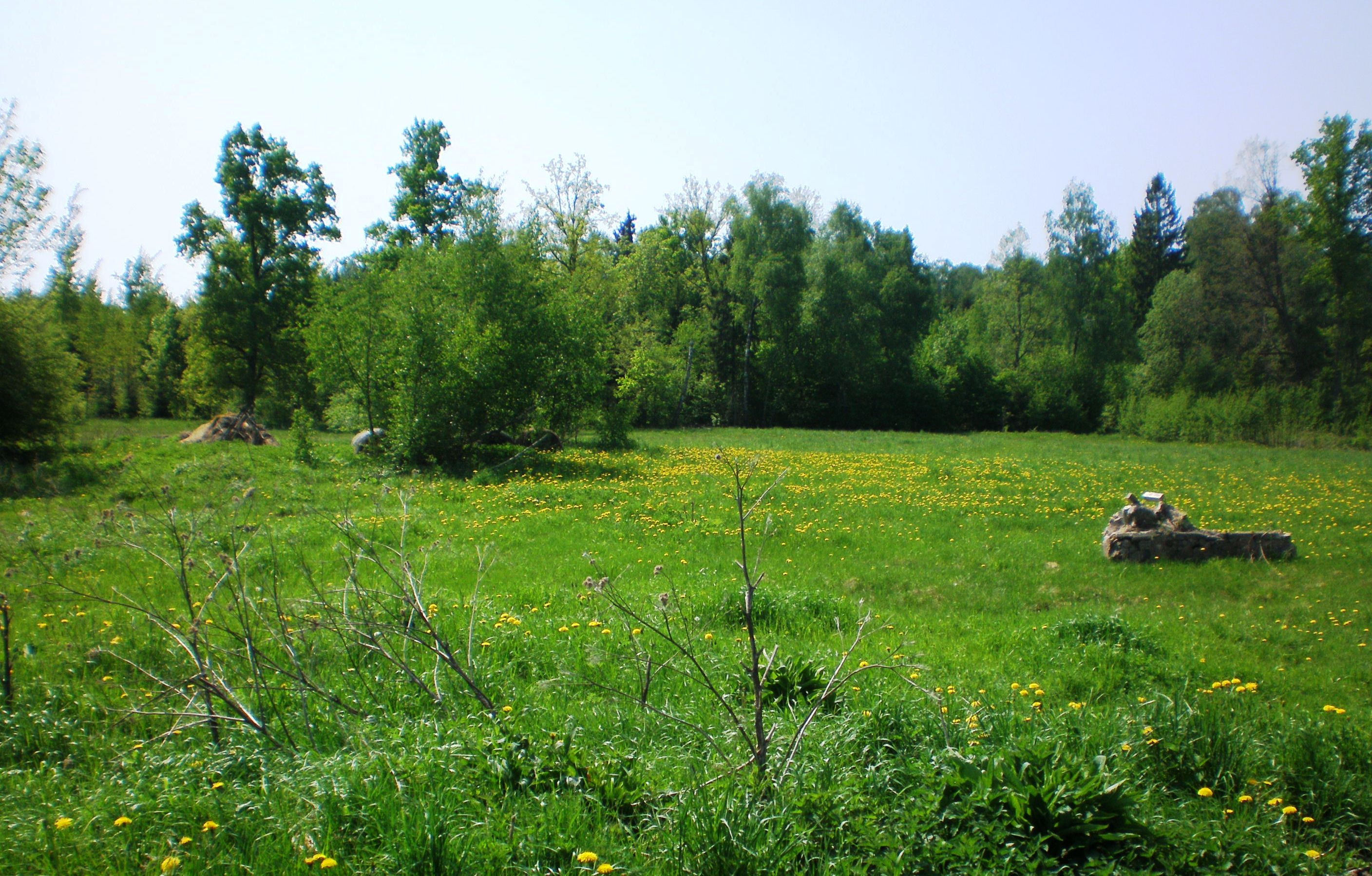

- Location in Lithuania Girynė (Lithuania)
- Coordinates: 55°24′40″N 23°46′52″E
- Country: Lithuania
- County: Kaunas County
- Municipality: Kėdainiai district municipality
- Eldership: Krakės Eldership

Population (2011)
  - Total: 0
- Time zone: UTC+2 (EET)
  - Summer (DST): UTC+3 (EEST)

Girynė ('a woods' place', formerly Russian: Гириня) is a village in Kėdainiai district municipality, in Kaunas County, in central Lithuania. According to the 2011 census, the village was uninhabited. It is located 3.5 kilometres (2.2 mi) from Krakės, nearby the Jaugila river, inside the Krakės-Dotnuva Forest.

== Demography ==
Historical population

Year	Pop.	±% p.a.
1902	38	—
1923	34	−0.53%
1959	16	−2.07%
1970	14	−1.21%

Year	Pop.	±% p.a.
1979	10	−3.67%
1989	7	−3.50%
2001	4	−4.56%
2011	0	−100.00%

Source: 1902, 1923, 1959 & 1970, 1979, 1989, 2001, 2011
