= Rimkai, Kėdainiai =

Rimkai
- Village
- Location in Lithuania Rimkai (Lithuania)
- Coordinates: 55°26′36″N 23°43′25″E
- Country: Lithuania
- County: Kaunas County
- Municipality: Kėdainiai district municipality
- Eldership: Krakės Eldership

Population (2011)
  - Total: 0
- Time zone: UTC+2 (EET)
  - Summer (DST): UTC+3 (EEST)

Rimkai (formerly Russian: Рымки) is a village in Kėdainiai district municipality, in Kaunas County, in central Lithuania. According to the 2011 census, the village was uninhabited. It is located 5 kilometres (3.1 mi) from Krakės, 1 kilometre (0.62 mi) from Jaugiliai, on the shore of the Rimkai Lake.

== History ==
Before the Soviet era, there was Rimkai folwark.

== Demography ==
Historical population

Year	Pop.	±% p.a.
1902	15	—
1923	16	+0.31%
1959	3	−4.54%
1970	3	+0.00%

Year	Pop.	±% p.a.
1979	0	−100.00%
1989	0	0.00%
2001	0	0.00%
2011	0	0.00%

Source: 1902, 1923, 1959 & 1970, 1979, 1989, 2001, 2011
