= Pasmilgys =

- Village
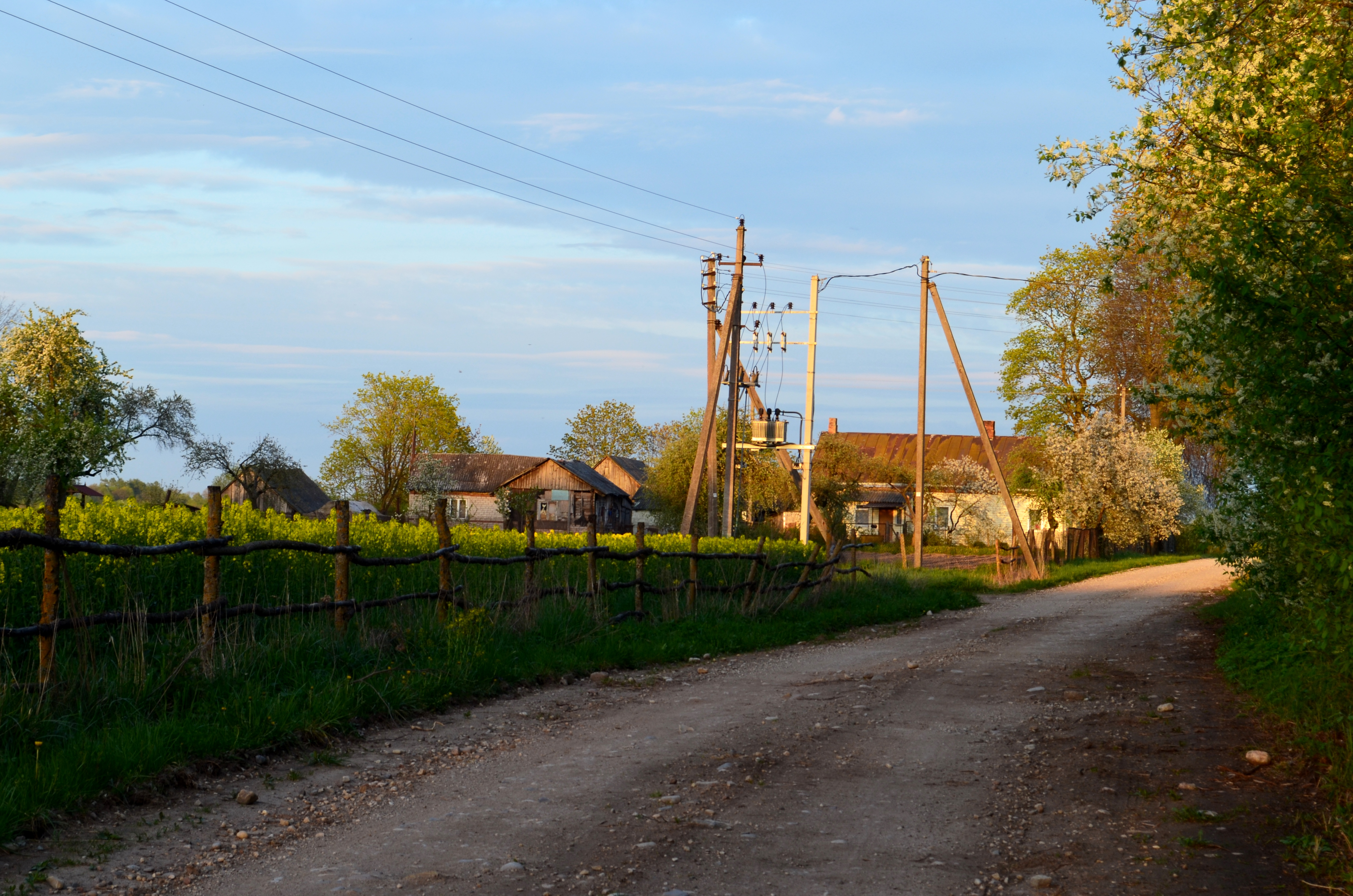

- Location in Lithuania Pasmilgys (Lithuania)
- Coordinates: 55°18′11″N 23°57′8″E
- Country: Lithuania
- County: Kaunas County
- Municipality: Kėdainiai district municipality
- Eldership: Kėdainiai City Eldership

Population (2011)
  - Total: 8
- Time zone: UTC+2 (EET)
  - Summer (DST): UTC+3 (EEST)

Pasmilgys is a village located in Kėdainiai district municipality, in Kaunas County, in central Lithuania. It is located by the Smilga river. The village had a population of 8 people as of the 2011 census.

There is a Holocaust burial place in Pasmilgys, where 2,076 Jews from Kėdainiai, Šėta and Žeimiai were murdered.

== Demography ==
Historical population

Year	Pop.	±% p.a.
1923	9	—
1959	9	+0.00%
1970	10	+0.96%
1979	12	+2.05%

Year	Pop.	±% p.a.
1989	5	−8.38%
2001	9	+5.02%
2011	8	−1.17%

Source: 1902, 1923, 1959 & 1970, 1979, 1989, 2001, 2011
