= Bartkūniškiai =

- Village
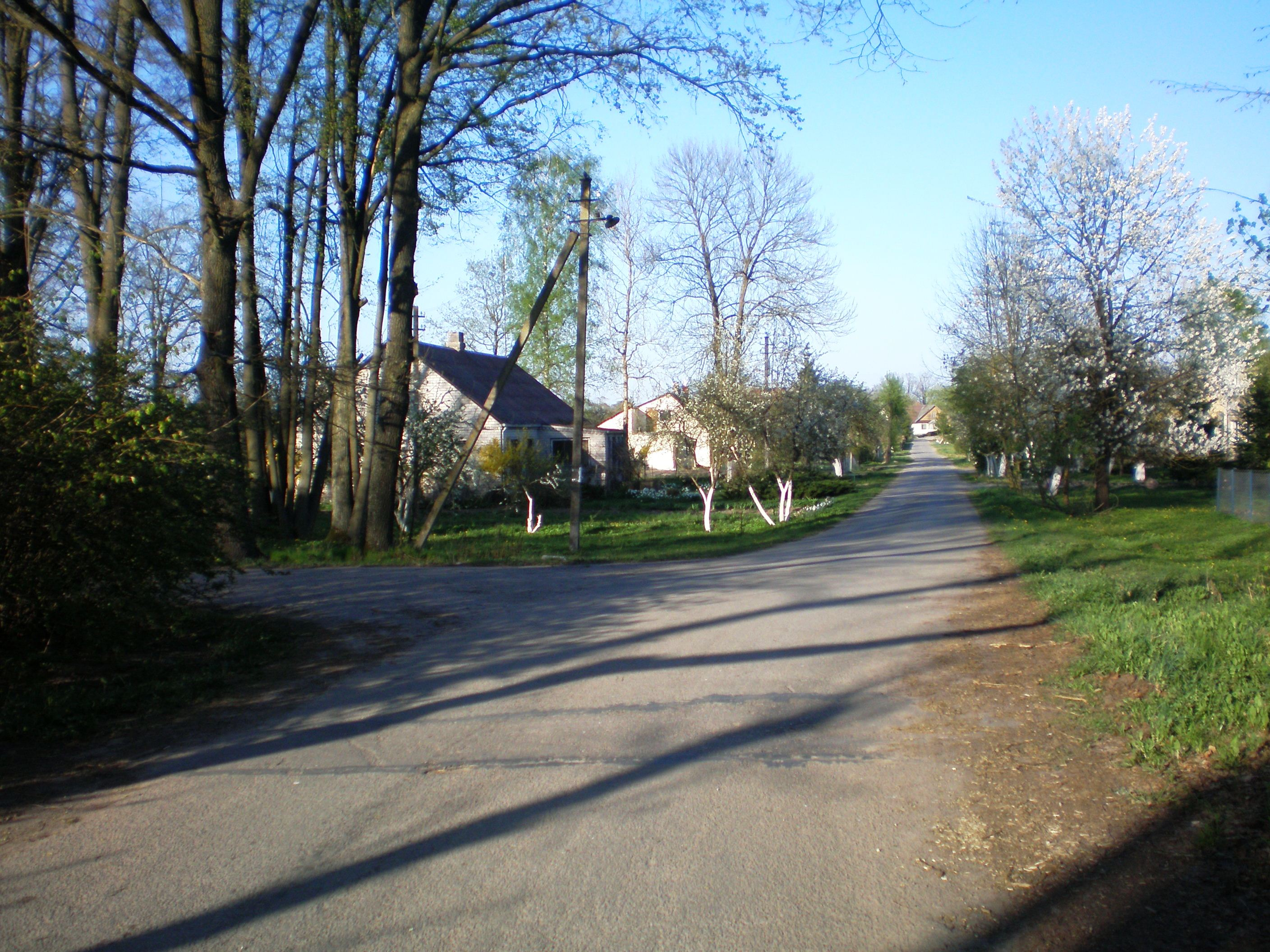

- Location in Lithuania Bartkūniškiai (Lithuania)
- Coordinates: 55°18′20″N 23°55′36″E
- Country: Lithuania
- County: Kaunas County
- Municipality: Kėdainiai district municipality
- Eldership: Kėdainiai City Eldership

Population (2011)
  - Total: 71
- Time zone: UTC+2 (EET)
  - Summer (DST): UTC+3 (EEST)

Bartkūniškiai is a village in Kėdainiai district municipality, in Kaunas County, central Lithuania. It is located 3 km from Kėdainiai, by the Smilga and Klamputis rivers. According to the 2011 census, the village has a population of 71 people.

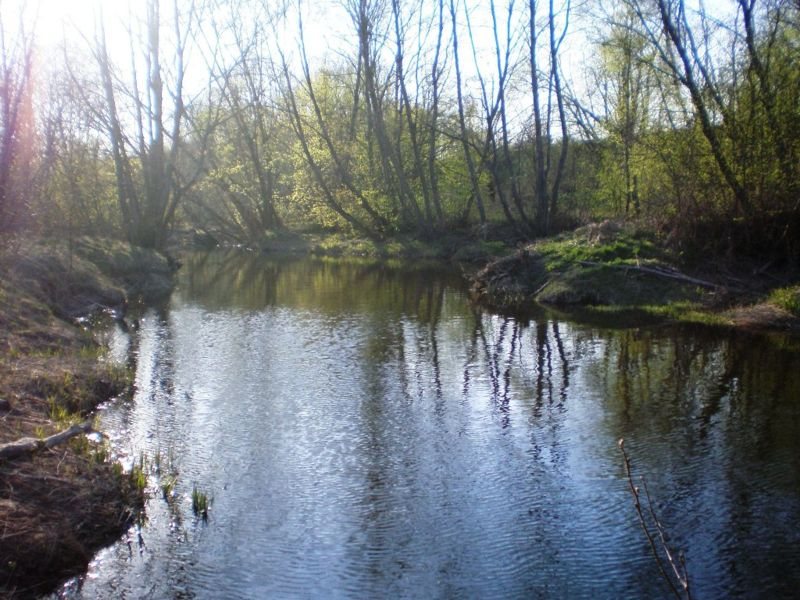
Smilga river near Bartkūniškiai

There are former folwark buildings and a park.

The Smilga River is near Bartkūniškiai.

== Demography ==
Historical population

Year	Pop.	±% p.a.
1902	18	—
1923	40	+3.88%
1959	10	−3.78%
1970	29	+10.16%

Year	Pop.	±% p.a.
1979	91	+13.55%
1989	85	−0.68%
2001	71	−1.49%
2011	85	+1.82%

Source: 1902, 1923, 1959 & 1970, 1979, 1989, 2001, 2011
