= Varėnai =

- Village
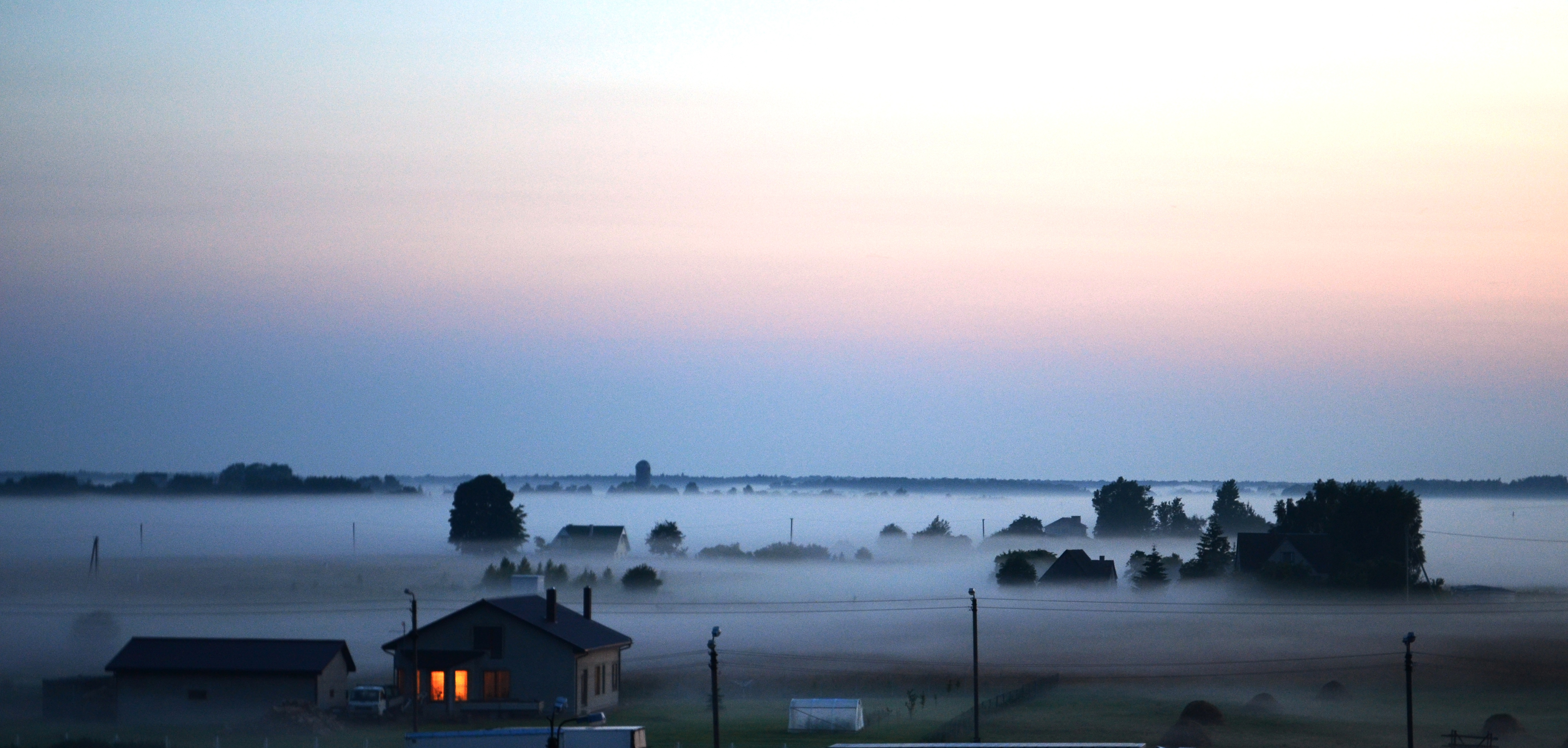

- Location in Lithuania Varėnai (Lithuania)
- Coordinates: 55°17′22″N 23°57′7″E
- Country: Lithuania
- County: Kaunas County
- Municipality: Kėdainiai district municipality
- Eldership: Kėdainiai City Eldership

Population (2011)
  - Total: 5
- Time zone: UTC+2 (EET)
  - Summer (DST): UTC+3 (EEST)

Varėnai (formerly Russian: Варены, Polish: Woreny) is a village in Kėdainiai district municipality, in Kaunas County, in central Lithuania. It is located in southwestern suburban area of the Kėdainiai city, by the Klamputis rivulet. According to the 2011 census, the village has a population of 5 people.

== Demography ==
Historical population

Year	Pop.	±% p.a.
1902	57	—
1959	66	+0.26%
1970	58	−1.17%
1979	33	−6.07%

Year	Pop.	±% p.a.
1989	20	−4.88%
2001	10	−5.61%
2011	5	−6.70%

Source: 1902, 1923, 1959 & 1970, 1979, 1989, 2001, 2011

== Gallery ==
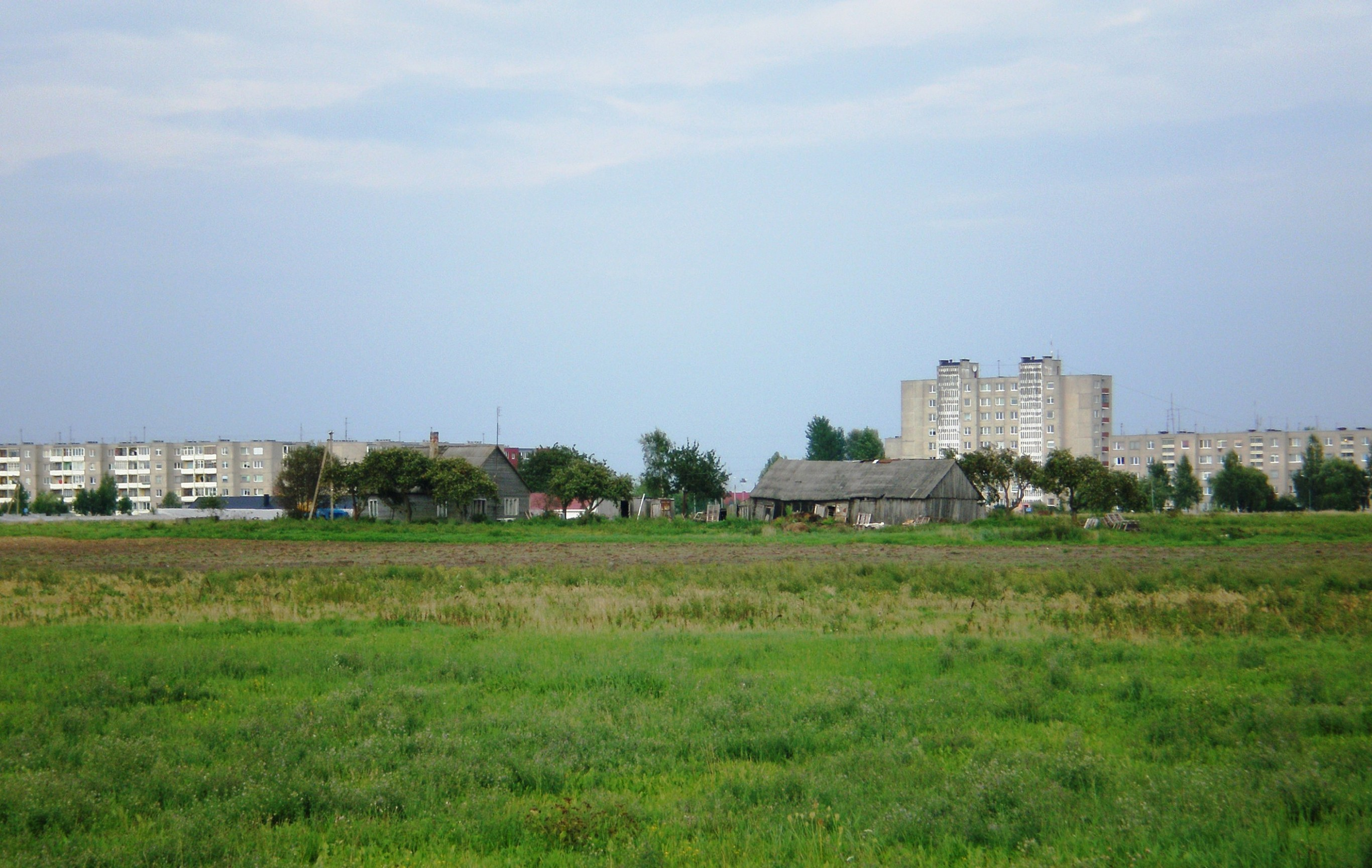
An old house

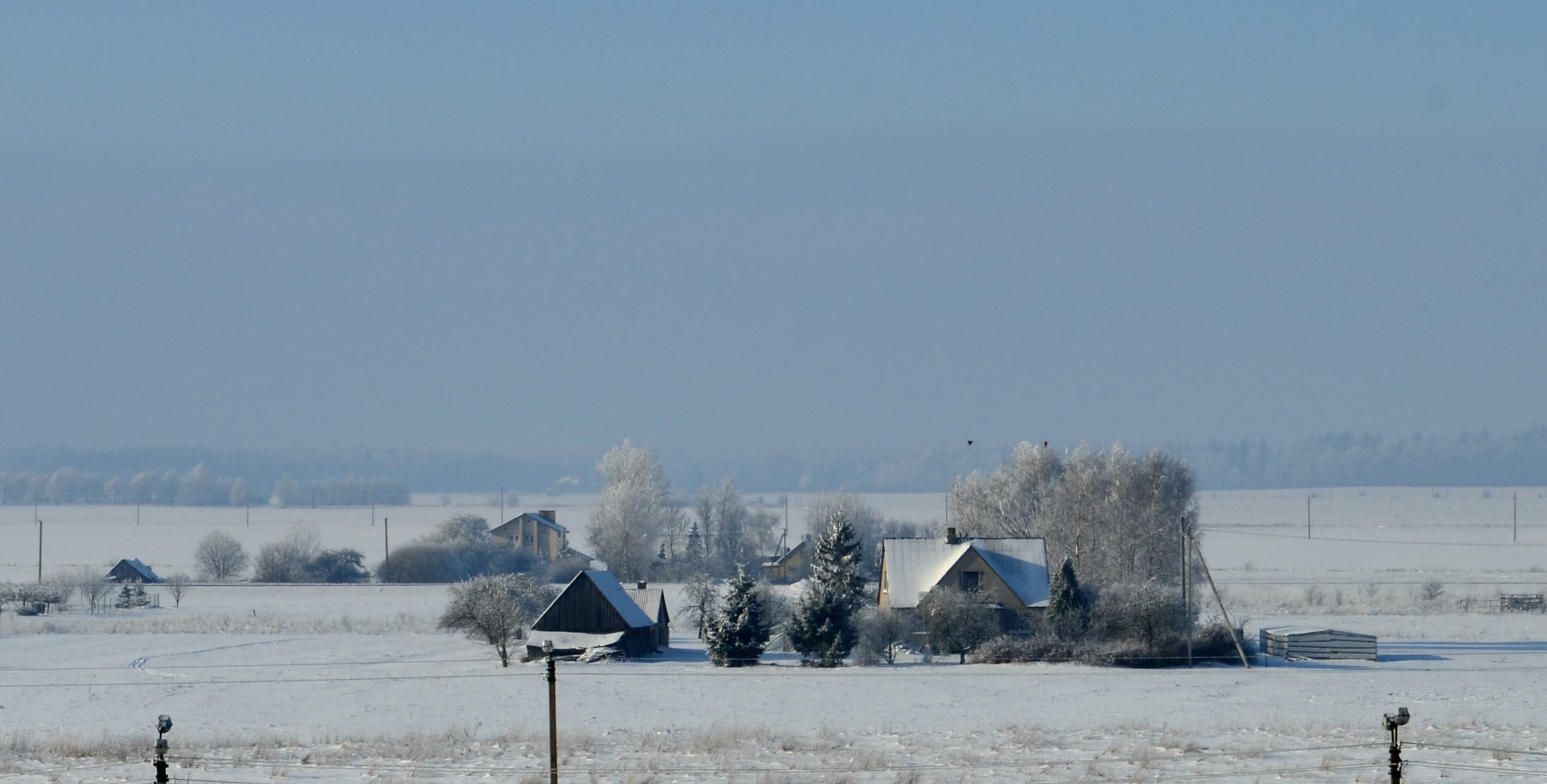
Varėnai in winter

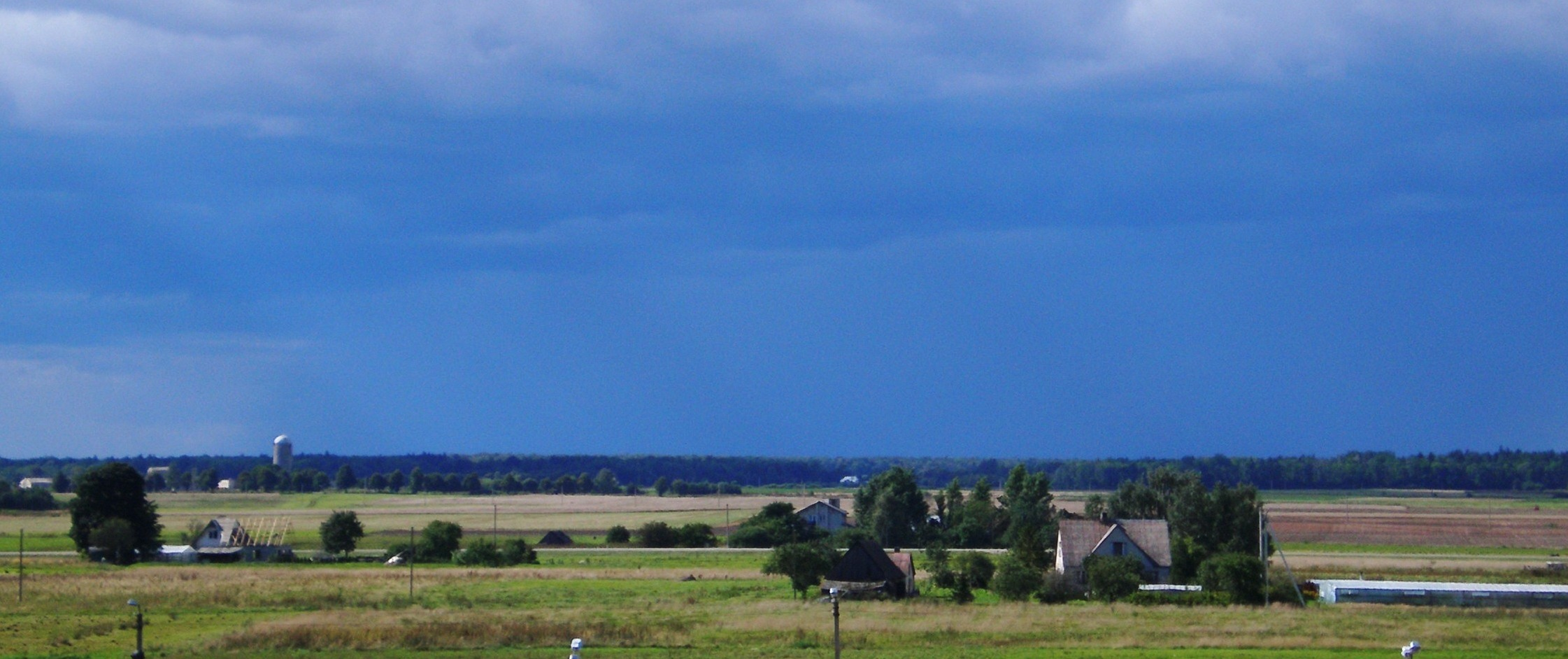
Varėnai looking from Kėdainiai
