= Smilga (river) =

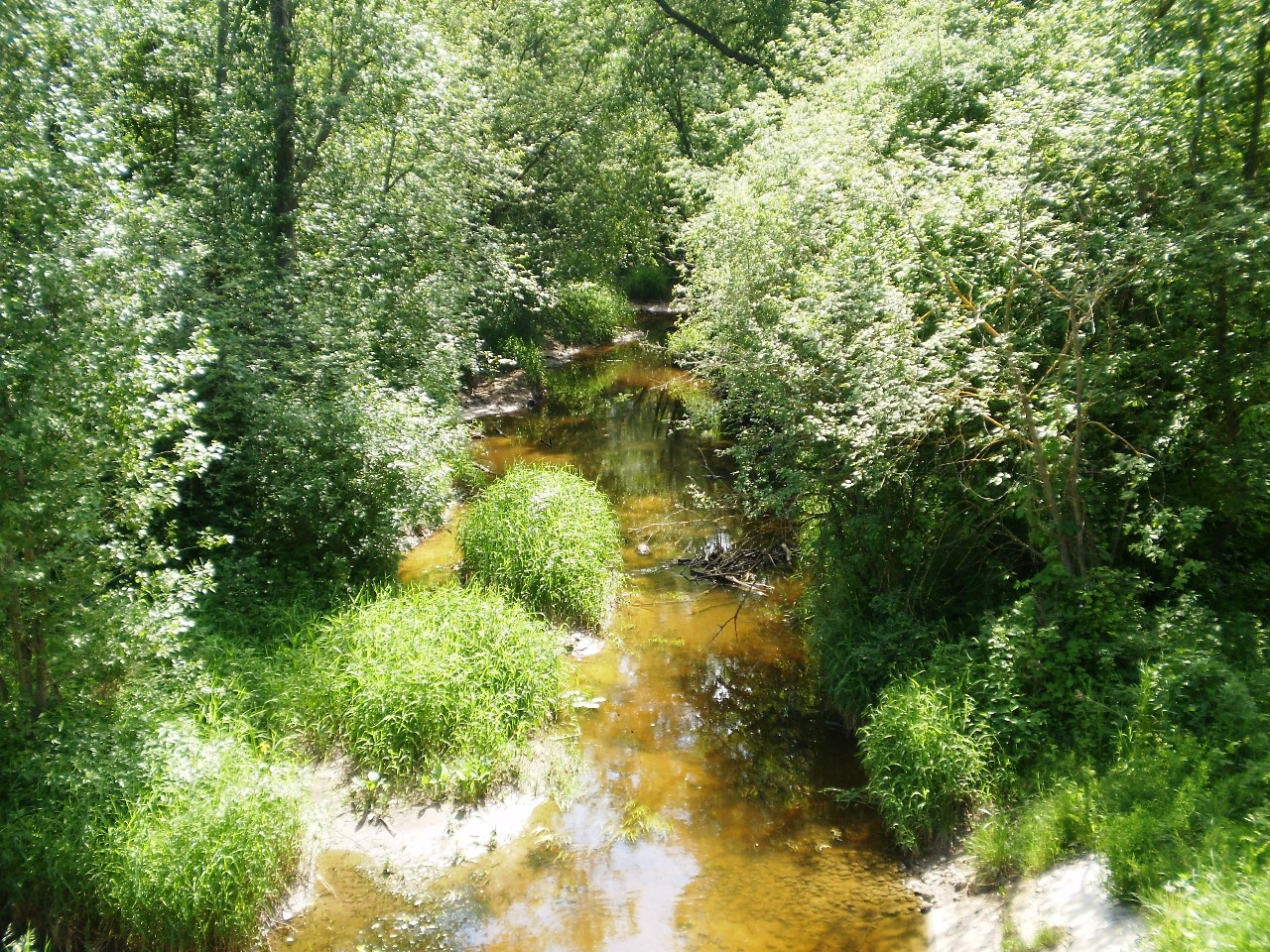
- The Smilga near Tubiai village

Location
- Country: Lithuania
- Region: Kėdainiai district municipality, Kaunas County

Physical characteristics
- Source
  - location: Patranys village
- Mouth: Nevėžis
  - coordinates: 55°17′17″N 23°59′04″E
- Length: 32 km (20 mi)
- Basin size: 208.8 km^{2} (80.6 sq mi)
- Discharge
  - average: 1.08 m^{3}/s (38 cu ft/s)

Basin features
- Progression: Nevėžis→ Neman→ Baltic Sea
- Tributaries
  - left: Tranys, Graisupis, Jaugila, Vištupis
  - right: Smilgaitis, Klamputis

The Smilga is a river in the Kėdainiai district municipality, in Kaunas County, central Lithuania. It flows for 32 kilometres (20 mi) and has a basin area of 208.8 km^{2} (80.6 sq mi).

It begins near the village of Patranys, in Krakės Eldership. The Smilga river flows mostly in a southeasterly direction through the Josvainiai Forest. It joins the Nevėžis in the centre of Kėdainiai.

The valley in upper and middle courses is negligible, though in becomes steep in the lower course. The course at some places has been straightened.

The Smilga passes through Medininkai, Palainiškiai, Šiukštuliškiai, Lipliūnai, Stasiūnai, Tubiai, Kėboniai, Bartkūniškiai, Pasmilgys villages and Kėdainiai city.

The name Smilga comes from the Lithuanian word smilga ('bentgrass').

== Images ==
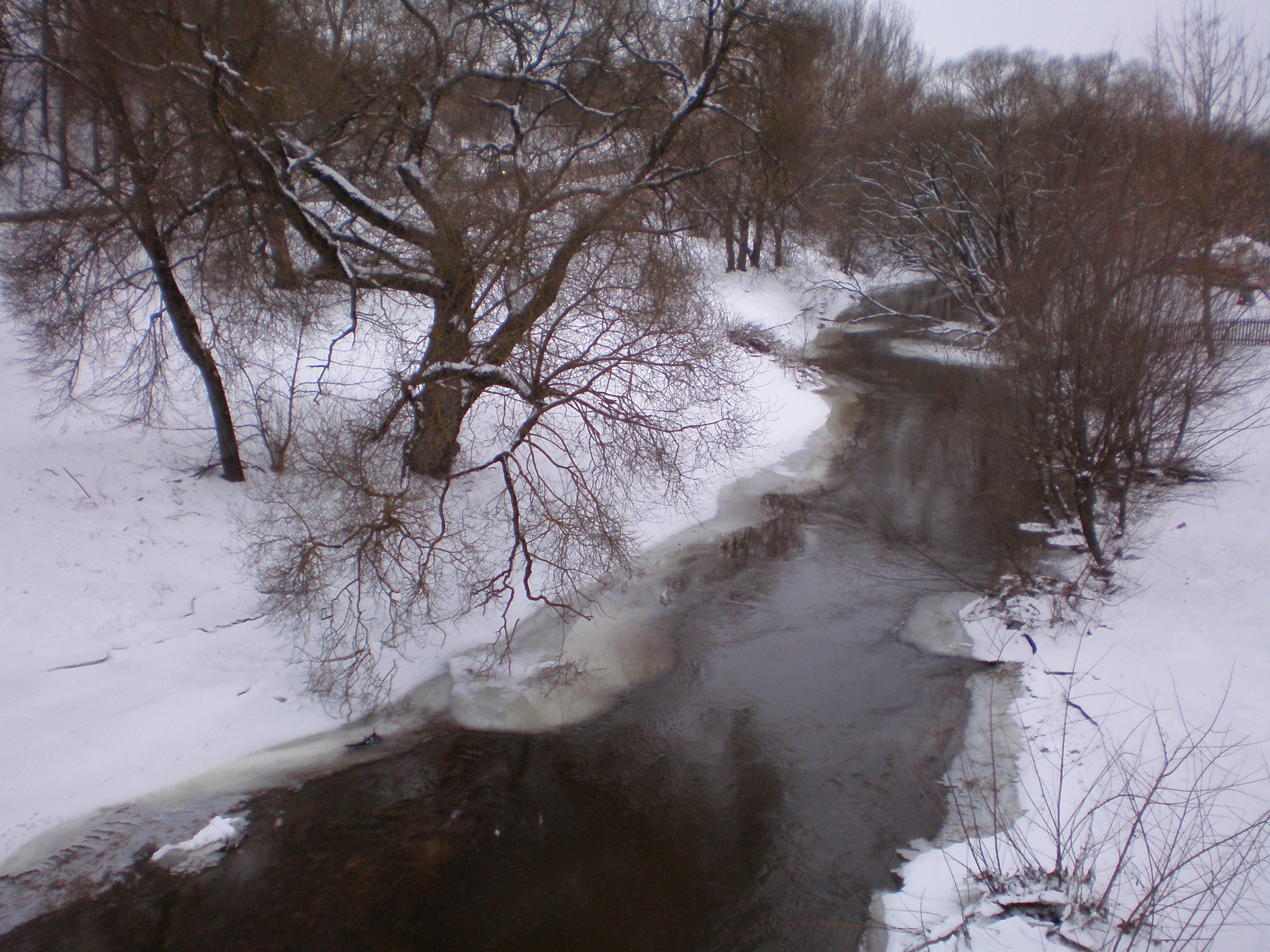
Smilga in Kėdainiai at winter

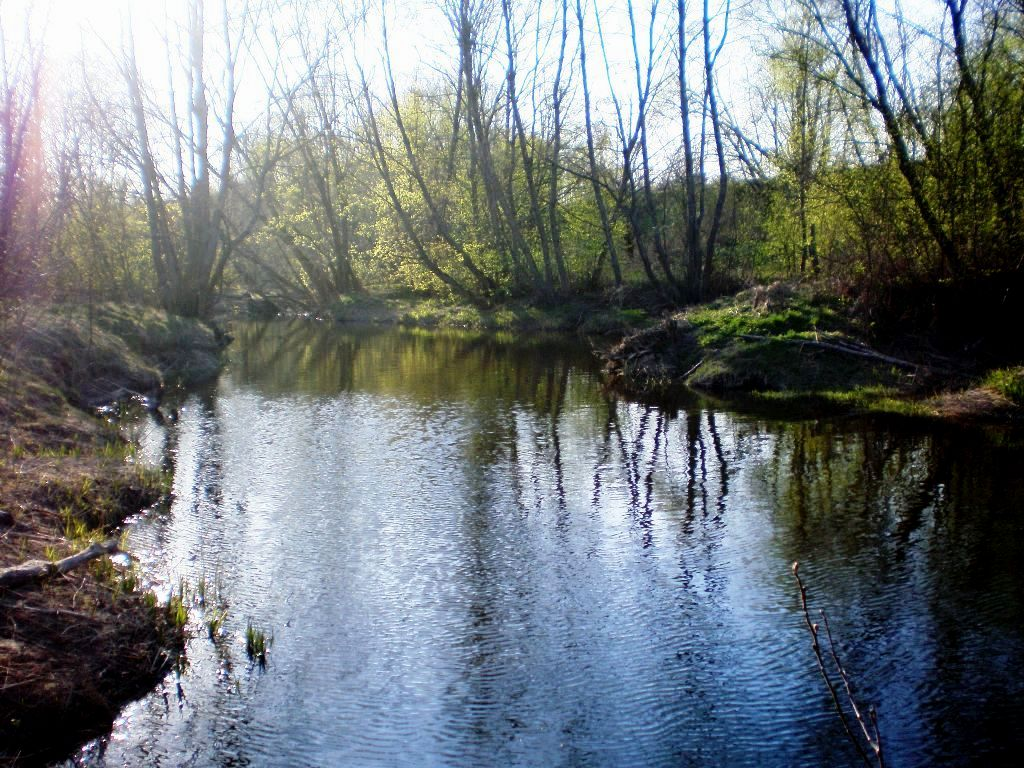
Smilga next to Bartkūniškiai

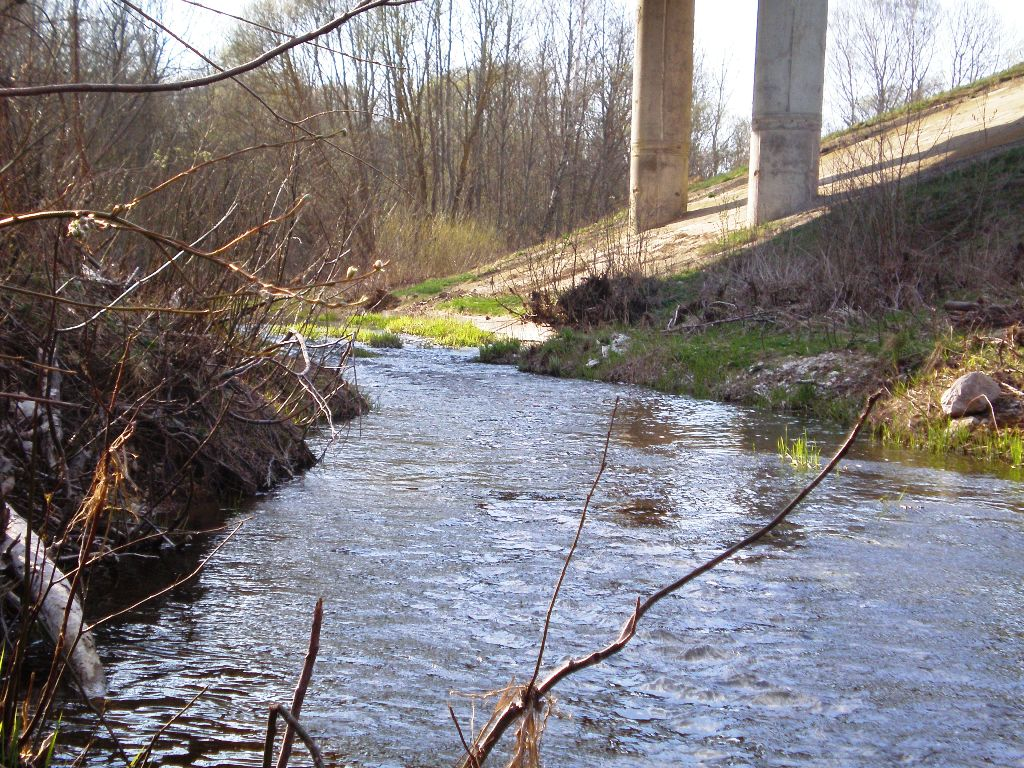
Smilga nearby Kėdainiai

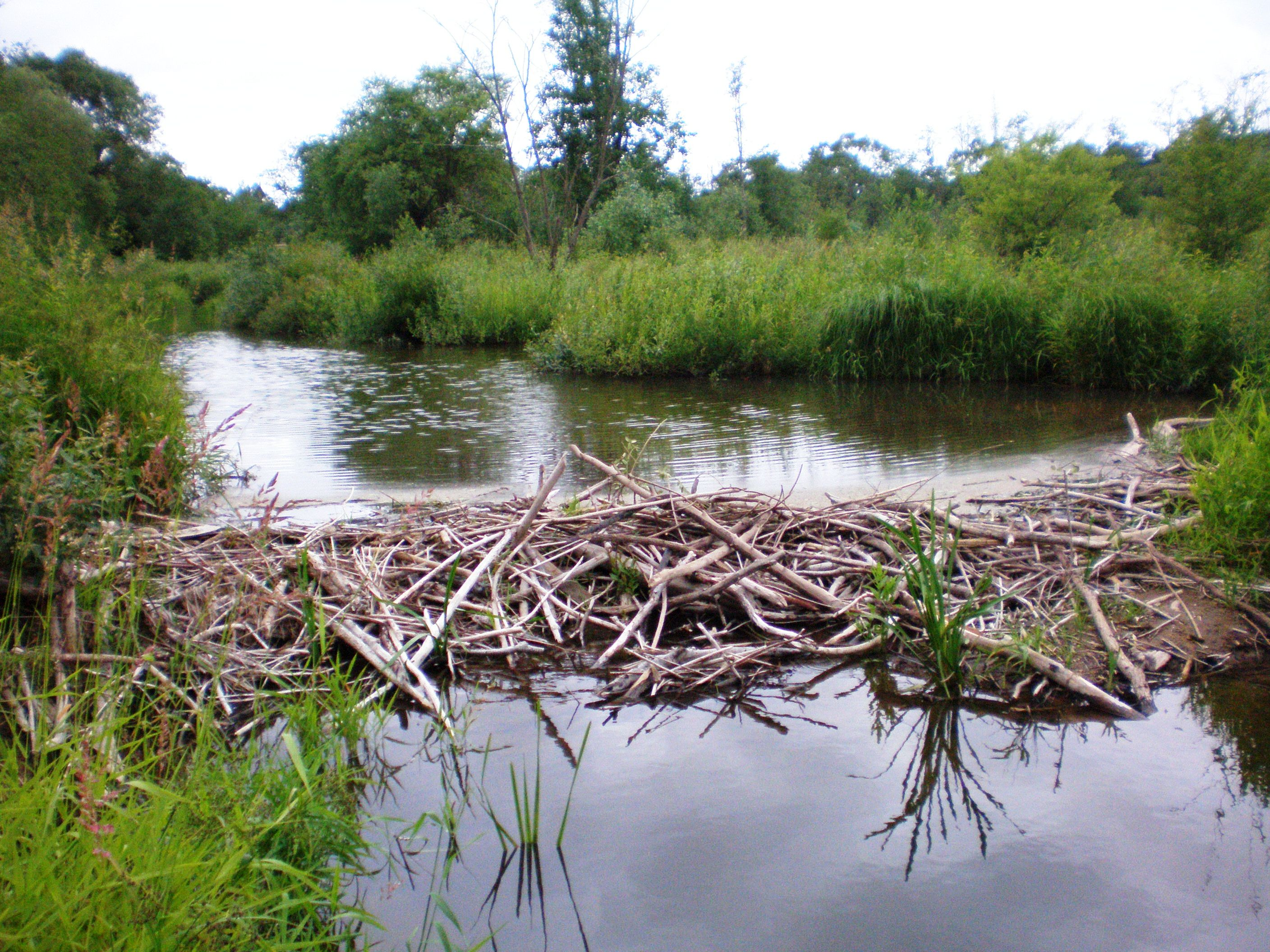
Beaver dam in Smilga

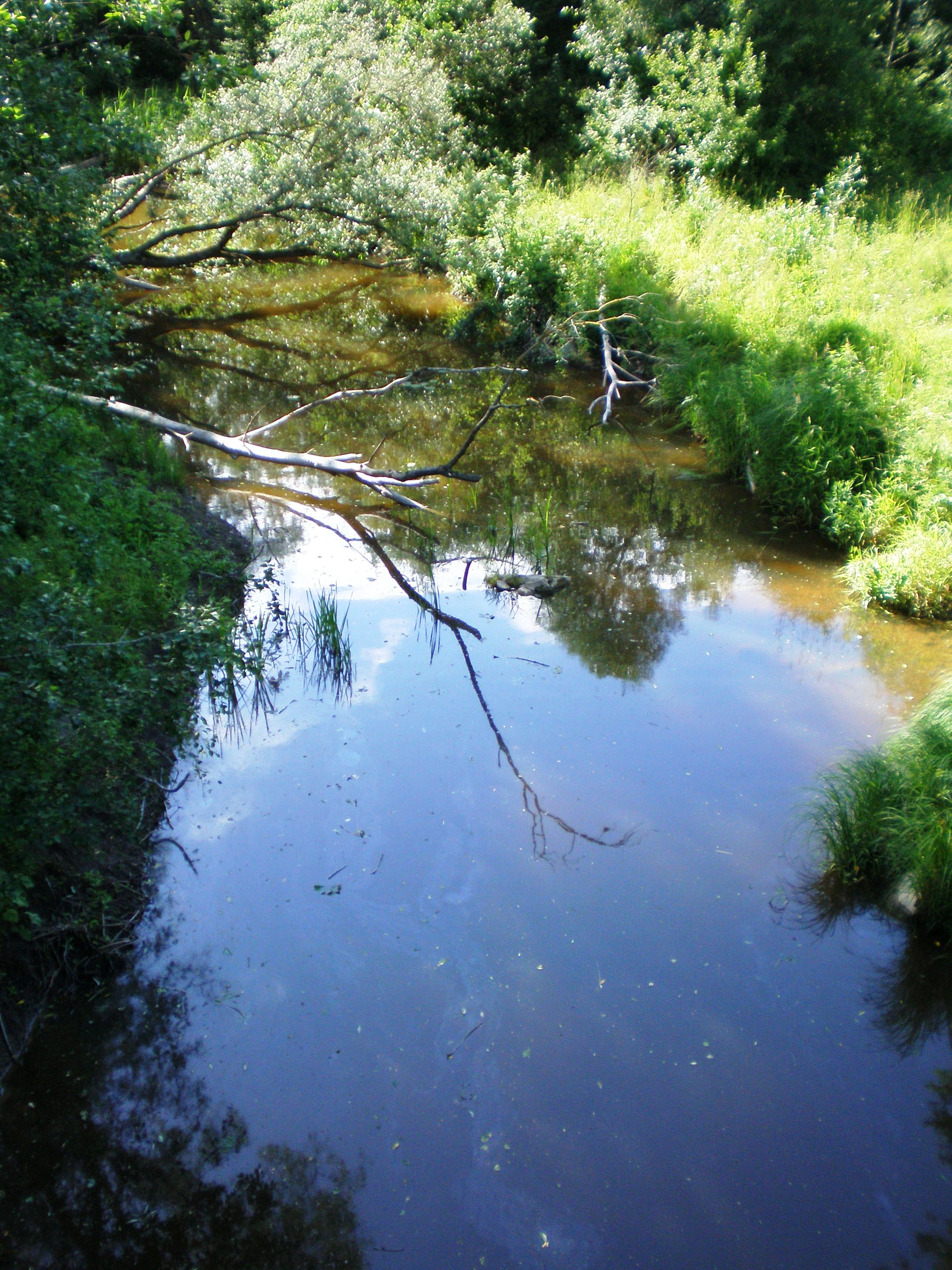
Smilga at Pasmilgys
