= Palainiškiai =

- Village
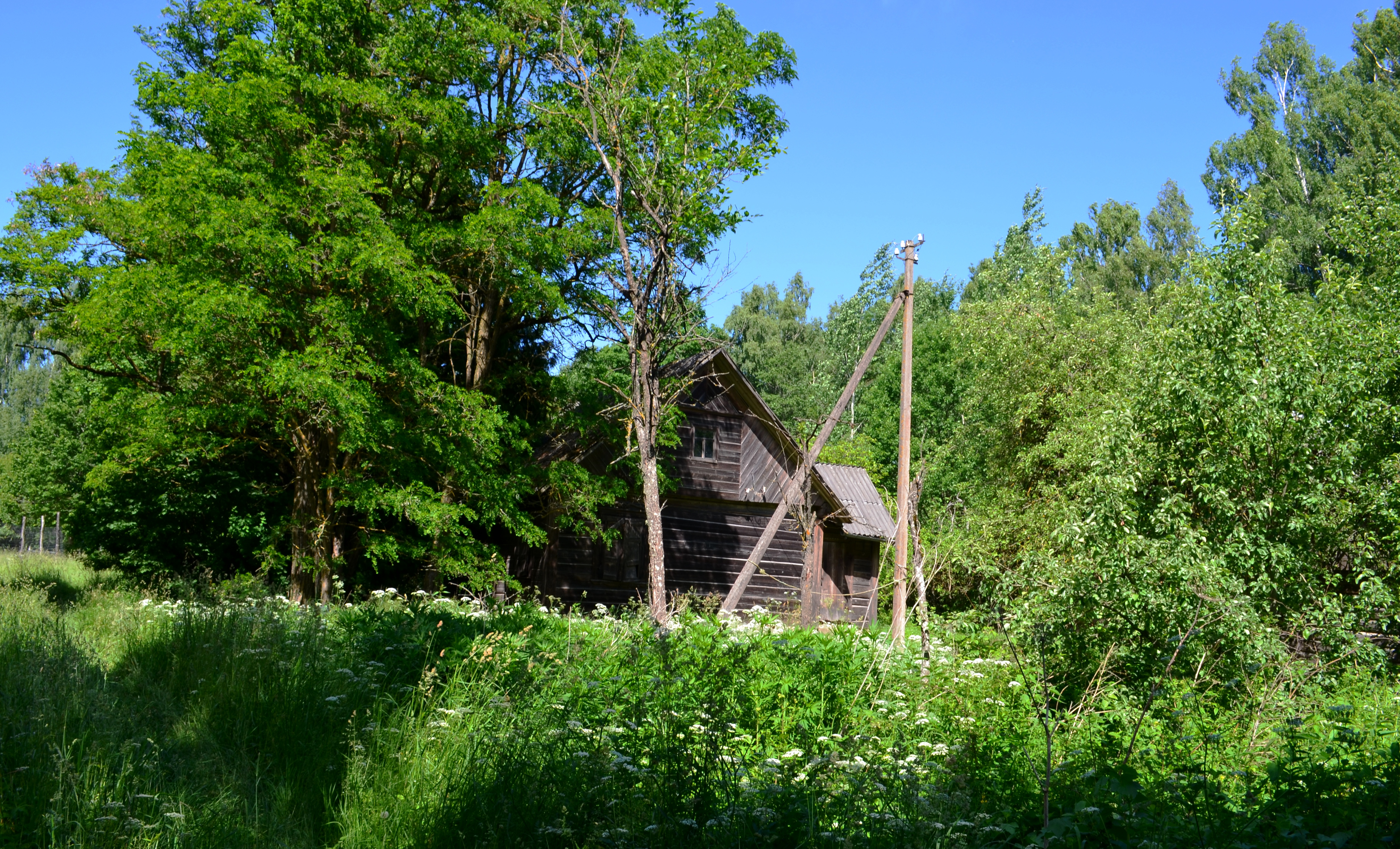

- Location in Lithuania Palainiškiai (Lithuania)
- Coordinates: 55°19′52″N 23°48′22″E
- Country: Lithuania
- County: Kaunas County
- Municipality: Kėdainiai district municipality
- Eldership: Krakės Eldership

Population (2011)
  - Total: 0
- Time zone: UTC+2 (EET)
  - Summer (DST): UTC+3 (EEST)

Palainiškiai (formerly Russian: Палайнишки, Polish: Pałajniszki) is a village in Kėdainiai district municipality, in Kaunas County, in central Lithuania. According to the 2011 census, the village was uninhabited. It is located 3 kilometres (1.9 mi) from Ąžuolaičiai, by the Kėdainiai-Krakės road, inside the Josvainiai Forest, by the Smilga river. The Smilga Landscape Sanctuary in located next to Palainiškiai.

At the beginning of the 20th century there was Palainiškiai estate in Josvainiai volost.

== Demography ==
Historical population

Year	Pop.	±% p.a.
1902	20	—
1923	32	+2.26%
1959	22	−1.04%
1970	11	−6.11%

Year	Pop.	±% p.a.
1979	7	−4.90%
1989	3	−8.12%
2001	0	−100.00%
2011	0	0.00%

Source: 1902, 1923, 1959 & 1970, 1979, 1989, 2001, 2011
