= Lipliūnai =

- Village
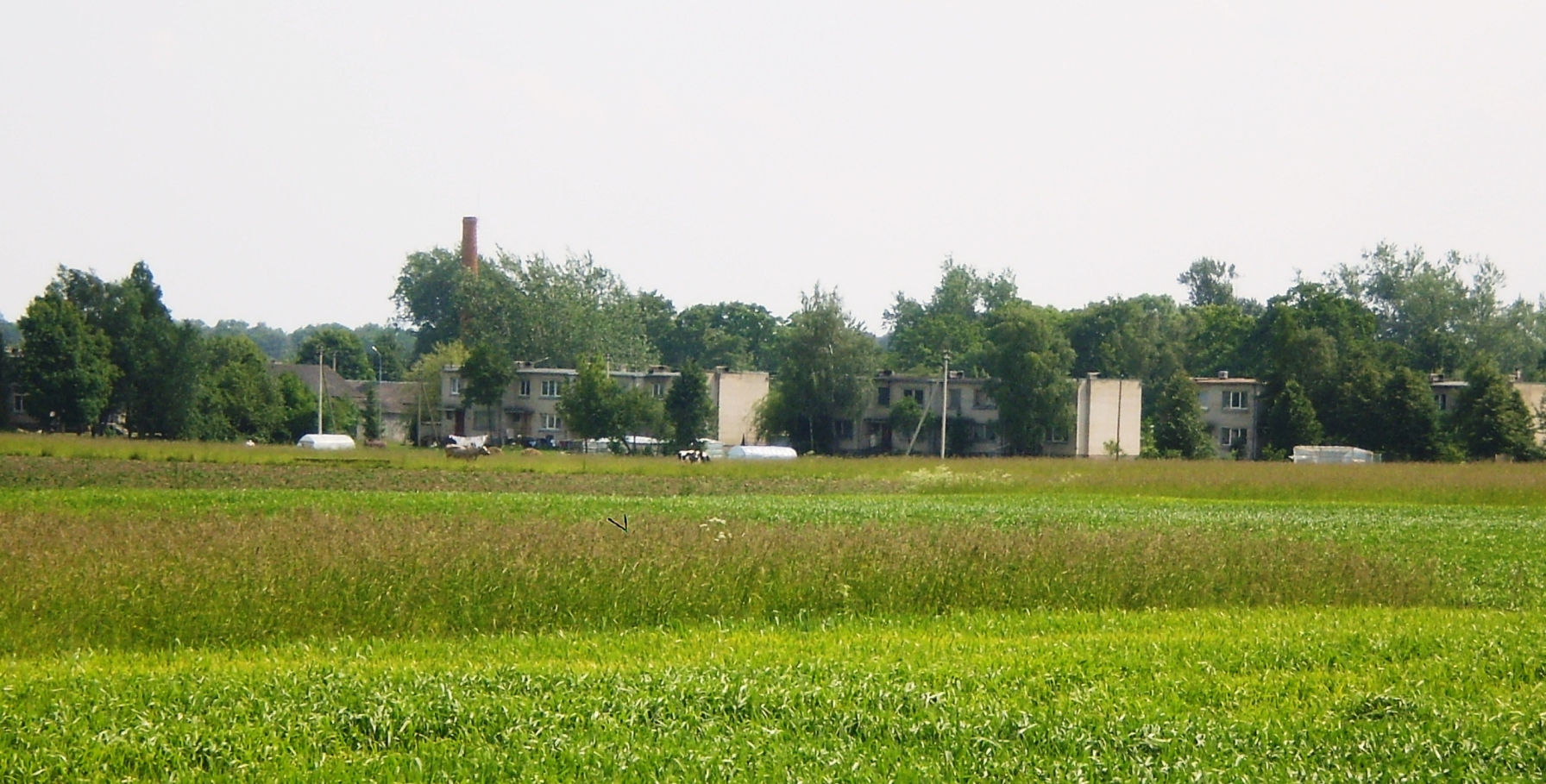

- Location in Lithuania Lipliūnai (Lithuania)
- Coordinates: 55°18′20″N 23°51′50″E
- Country: Lithuania
- County: Kaunas County
- Municipality: Kėdainiai district municipality
- Eldership: Kėdainiai City Eldership

Population (2011)
  - Total: 182
- Time zone: UTC+2 (EET)
  - Summer (DST): UTC+3 (EEST)

Lipliūnai is a village in Kėdainiai district municipality, in Kaunas County, central Lithuania. It is located by the Smilga river, near the Josvainiai forest. According to the 2011 census, the village has a population of 182 people.

== Demography ==
Historical population

Year	Pop.	±% p.a.
1902	183	—
1923	380	+3.54%
1959	312	−0.55%
1970	204	−3.79%
1979	214	+0.53%

Year	Pop.	±% p.a.
1986	225	+0.72%
1989	218	−1.05%
2001	192	−1.05%
2011	182	−0.53%

Source: 1902, 1923, 1959 & 1970, 1979, 1989, 2001, 2011

== Gallery ==
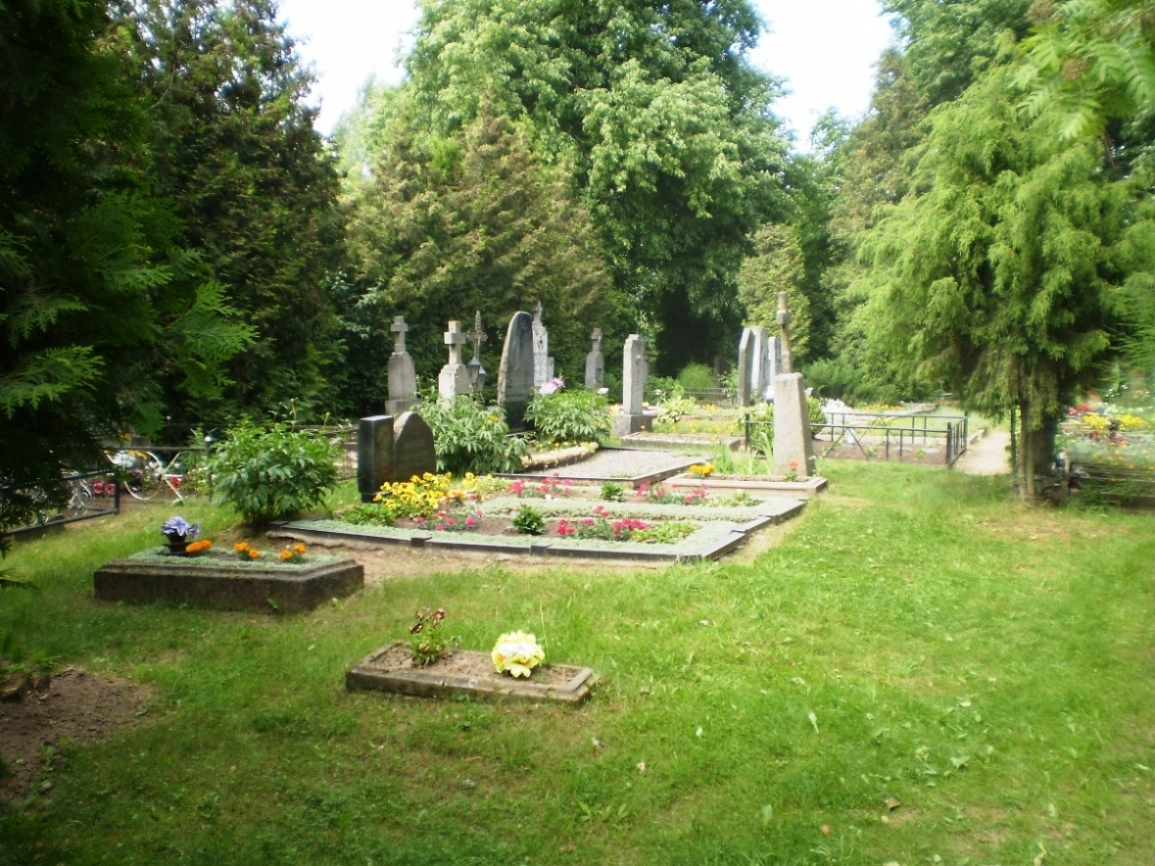
Cemetery

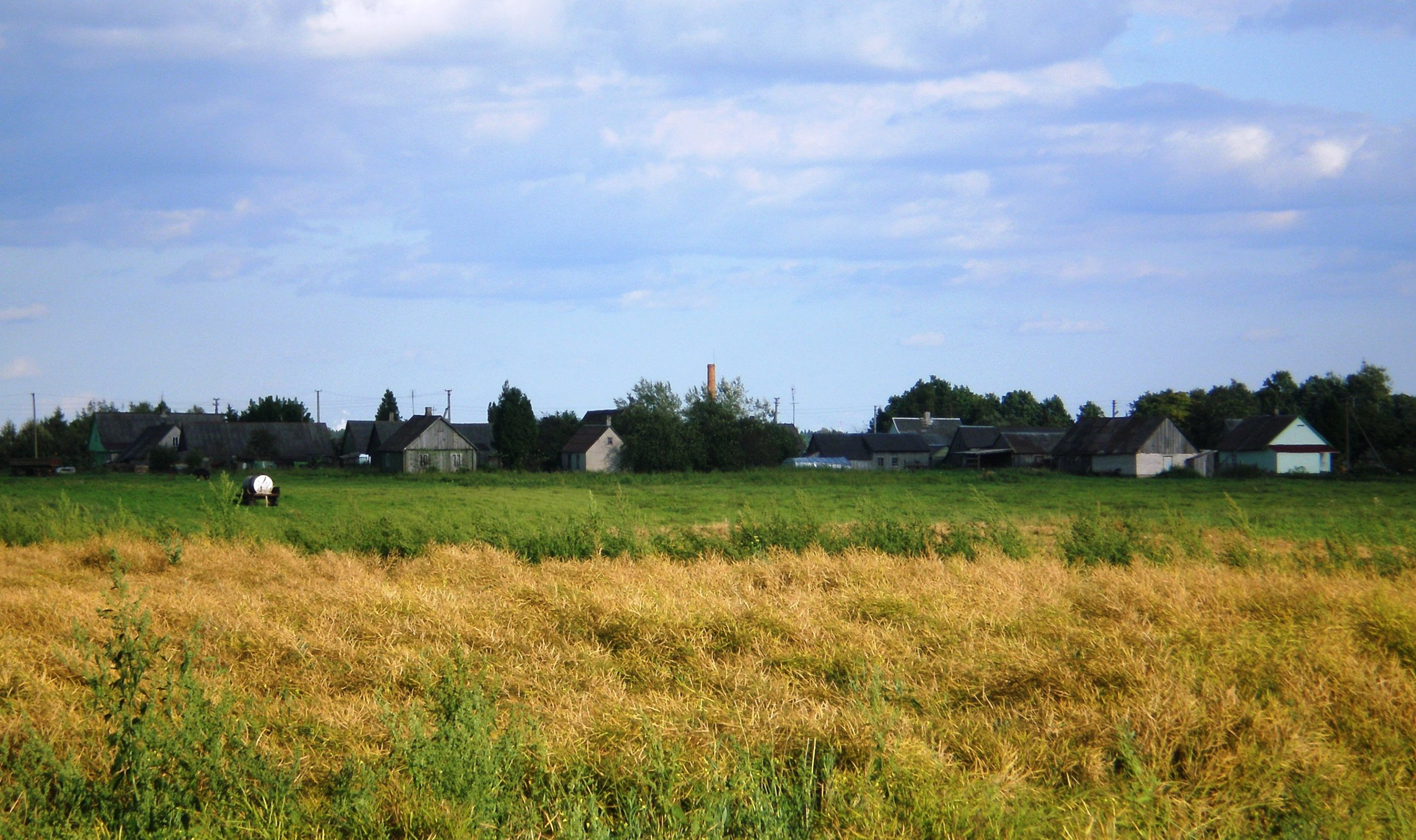
View to the village

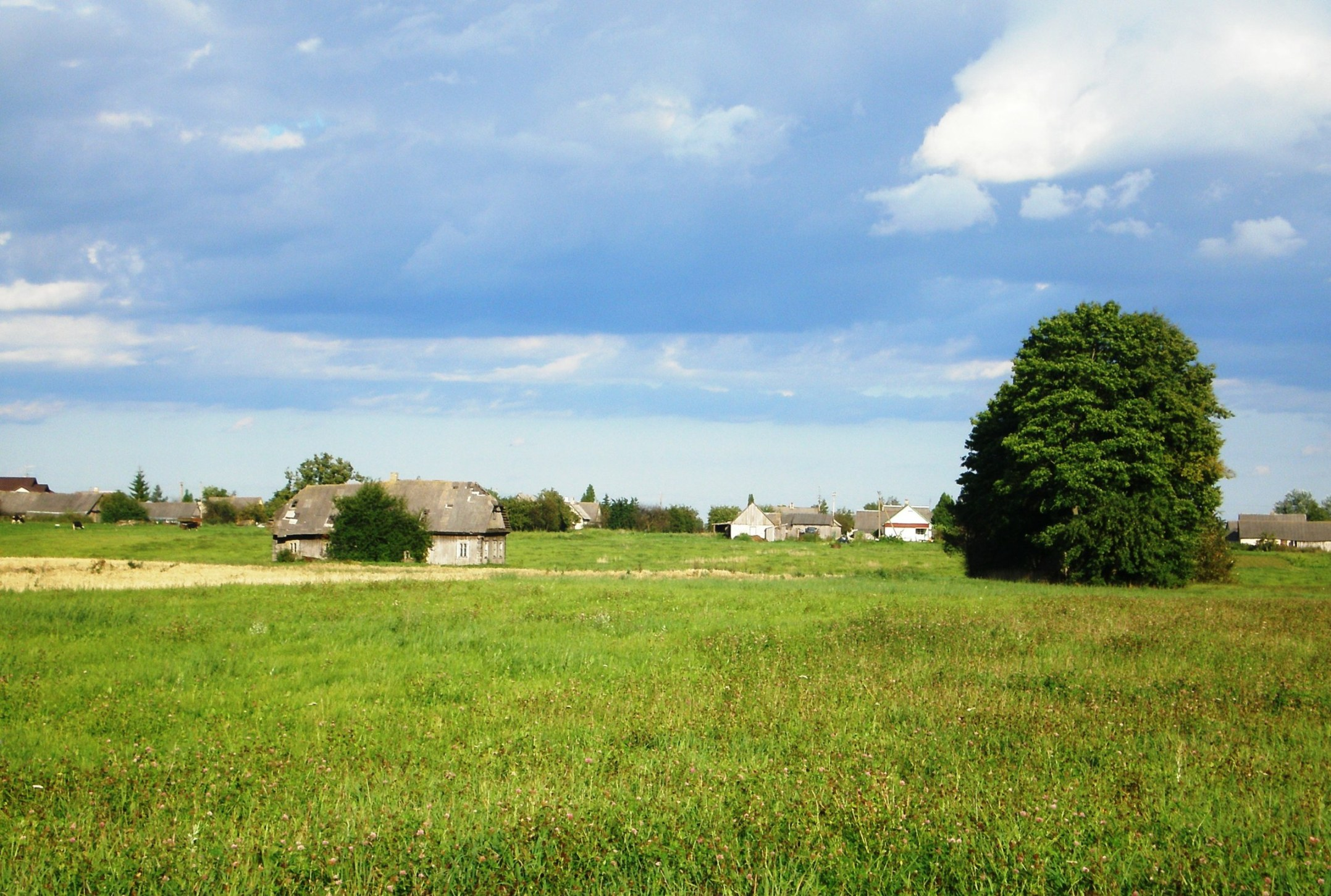
An old house

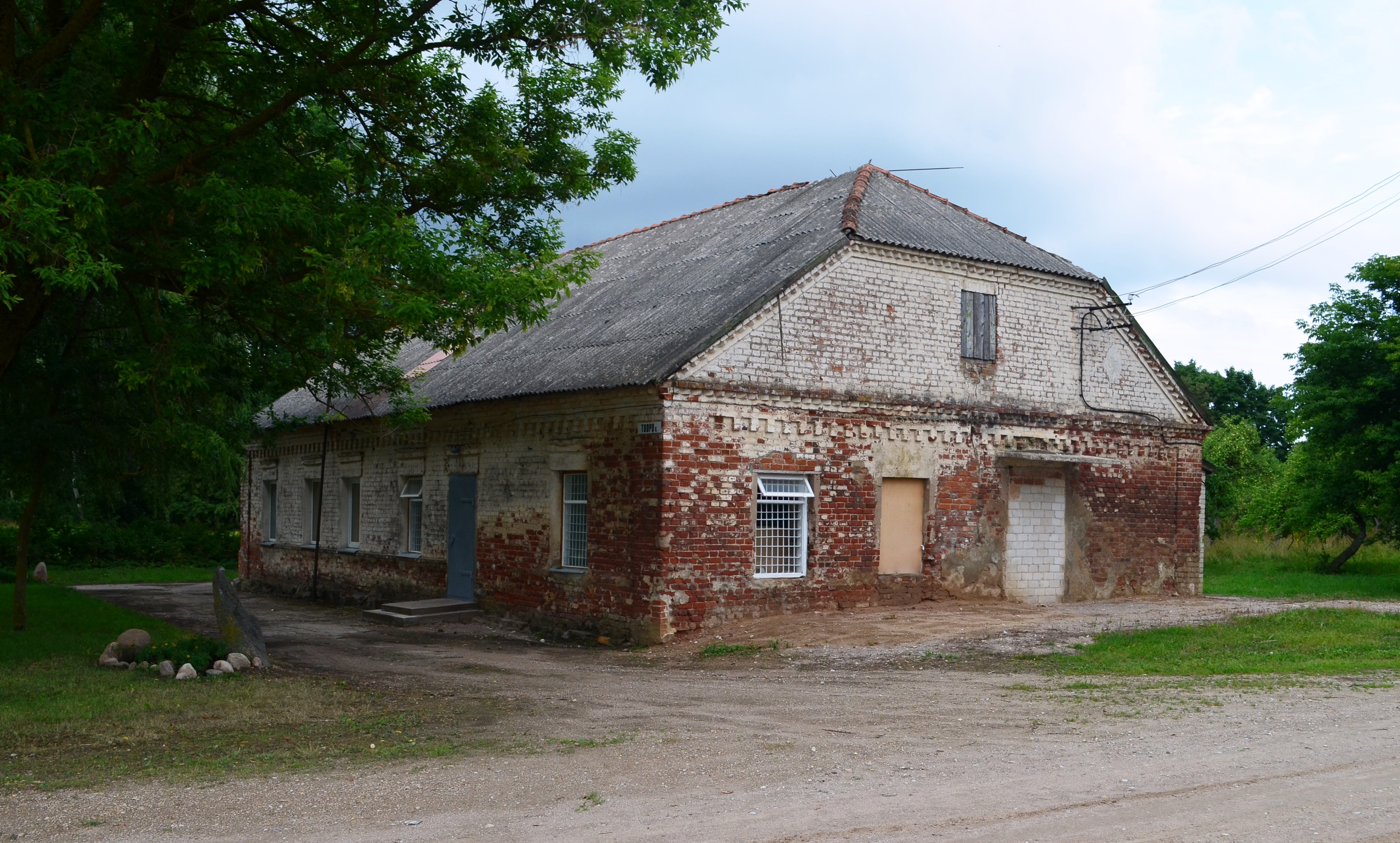
One of former manor buildings
