= Jaugiliai =

- Village
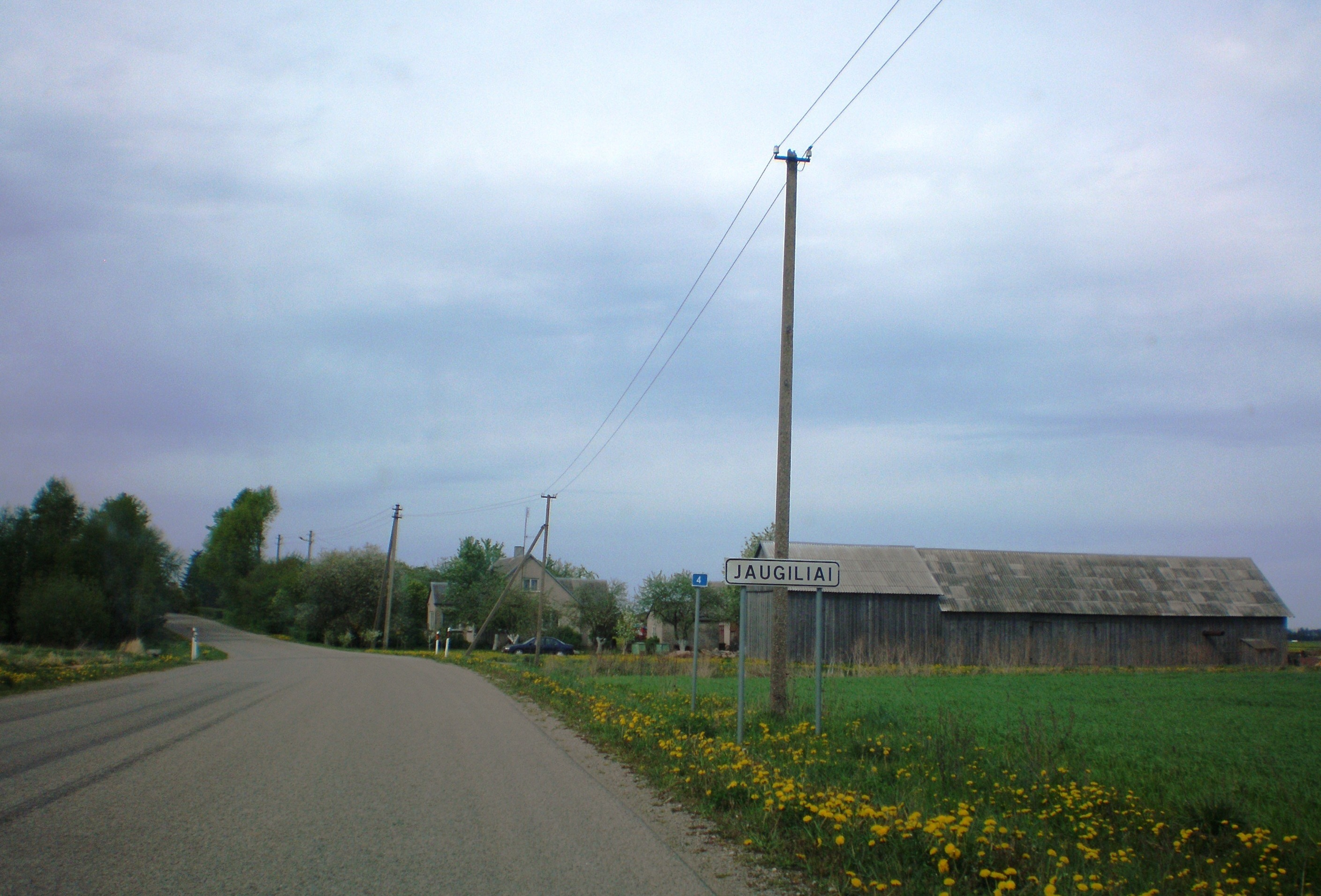

- Location in Lithuania Jaugiliai (Lithuania)
- Coordinates: 55°26′38″N 23°44′31″E
- Country: Lithuania
- County: Kaunas County
- Municipality: Kėdainiai district municipality
- Eldership: Krakės Eldership

Population (2011)
  - Total: 57
- Time zone: UTC+2 (EET)
  - Summer (DST): UTC+3 (EEST)

Jaugiliai (Polish: Jawgiele, Russian: Явгели) is a village in Kėdainiai district municipality, in Kaunas County, in central Lithuania. According to the 2011 census, the village had a population of 57 people. It is located 4 kilometres (2.5 mi) from Krakės, by the Krakės-Gudžiūnai road. It is located on the shore of the Jaugiliai Lake, by the Jaugila river.

At the beginning of the 20th century Jaugiliai was an estate and okolica, a property of the Malinavičiai, Valatkos ir Savičiai and Liudkevičiai families.

== Demography ==
Historical population

Year	Pop.	±% p.a.
1902	99	—
1923	106	+0.33%
1959	74	−0.99%
1970	118	+4.33%

Year	Pop.	±% p.a.
1979	91	−2.85%
1989	79	−1.40%
2001	71	−0.89%
2011	57	−2.17%

Source: 1902, 1923, 1959 & 1970, 1979, 1989, 2001, 2011

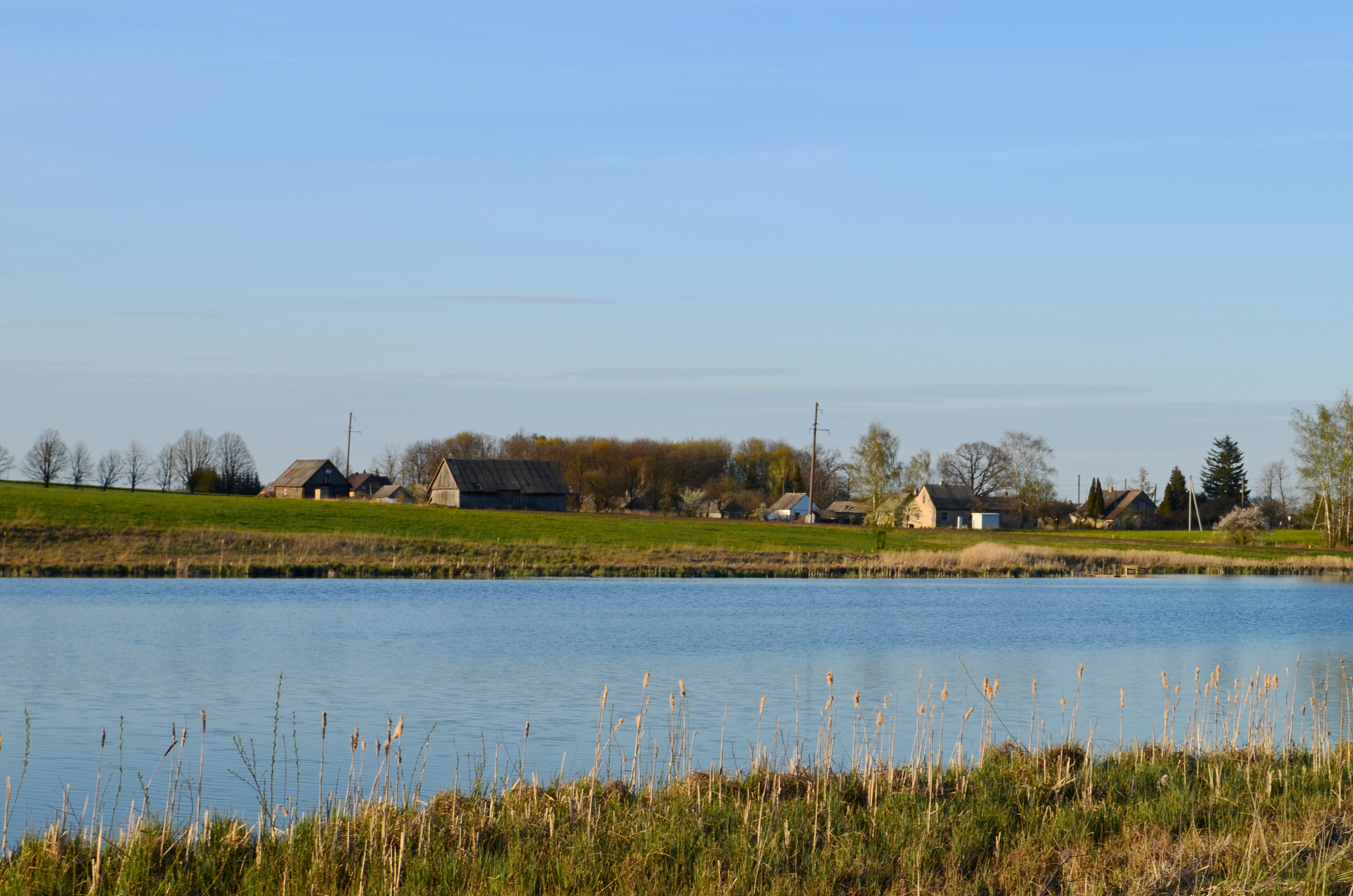
Jaugiliai on the lake shore
