= Tubiai =

- Village
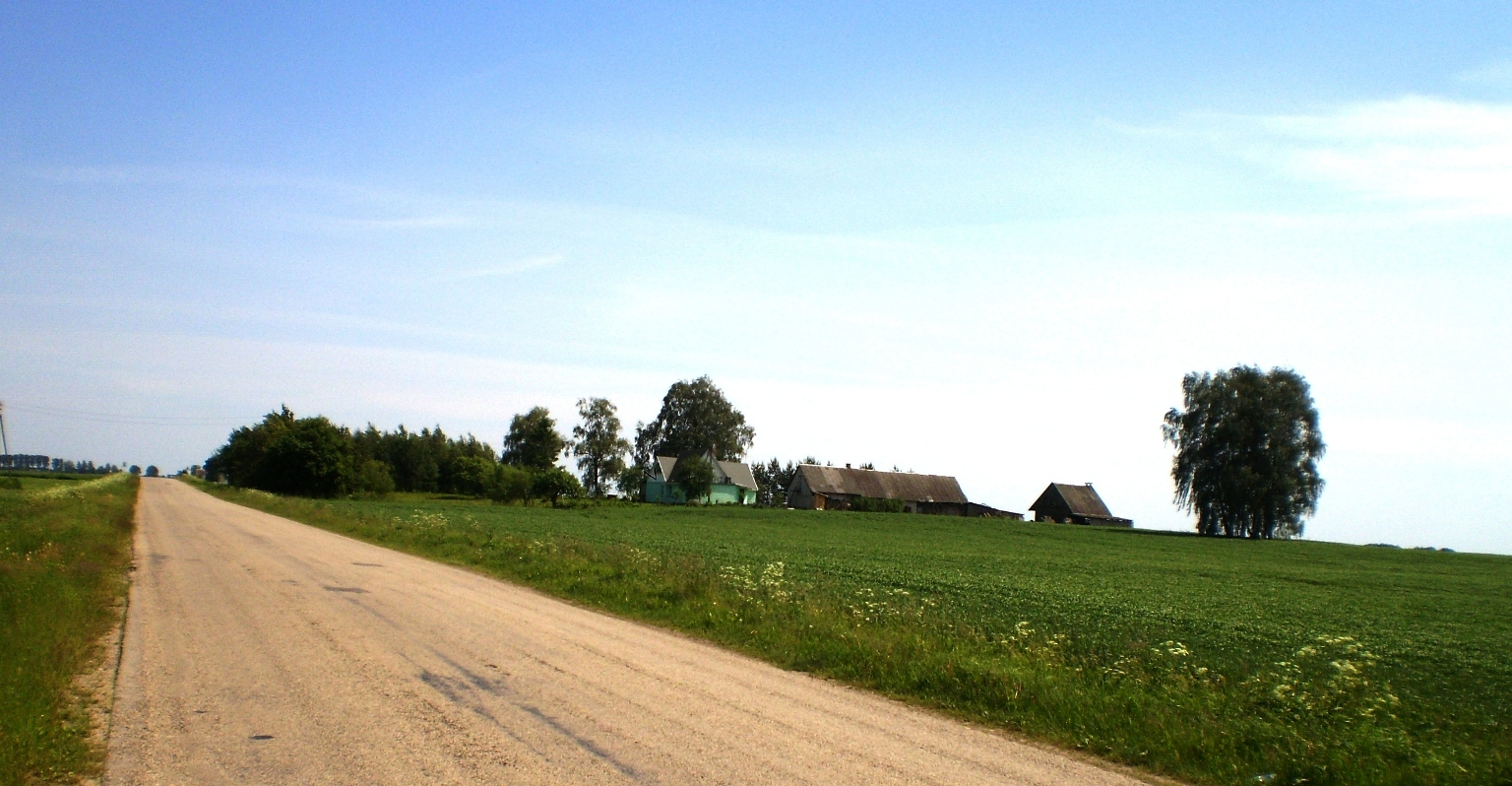

- Location in Lithuania Tubiai (Lithuania)
- Coordinates: 55°17′48″N 23°55′11″E
- Country: Lithuania
- County: Kaunas County
- Municipality: Kėdainiai district municipality
- Eldership: Kėdainiai City Eldership

Population (2011)
  - Total: 19
- Time zone: UTC+2 (EET)
  - Summer (DST): UTC+3 (EEST)

Tubiai is a village in Kėdainiai district municipality, in Kaunas County, central Lithuania. According to the 2011 census, the village has a population of 19 people.

== Demography ==
Historical population

Year	Pop.	±% p.a.
1902	87	—
1923	116	+1.38%
1959	84	−0.89%
1970	94	+1.03%

Year	Pop.	±% p.a.
1979	38	−9.57%
1989	25	−4.10%
2001	33	+2.34%
2011	19	−5.37%

Source: 1902, 1923, 1959 & 1970, 1979, 1989, 2001, 2011

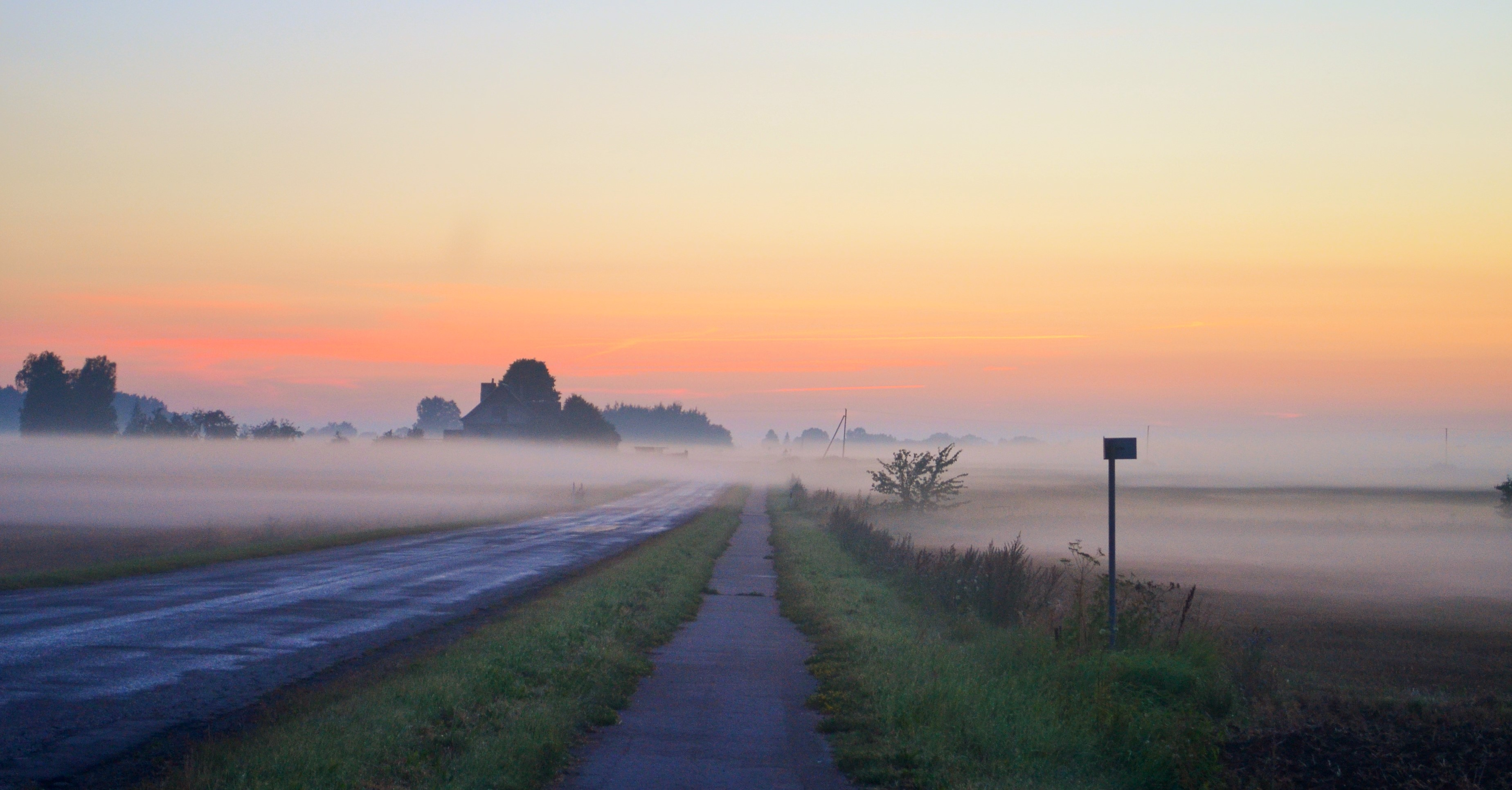
Evening in Tubiai
