= Jaugila =

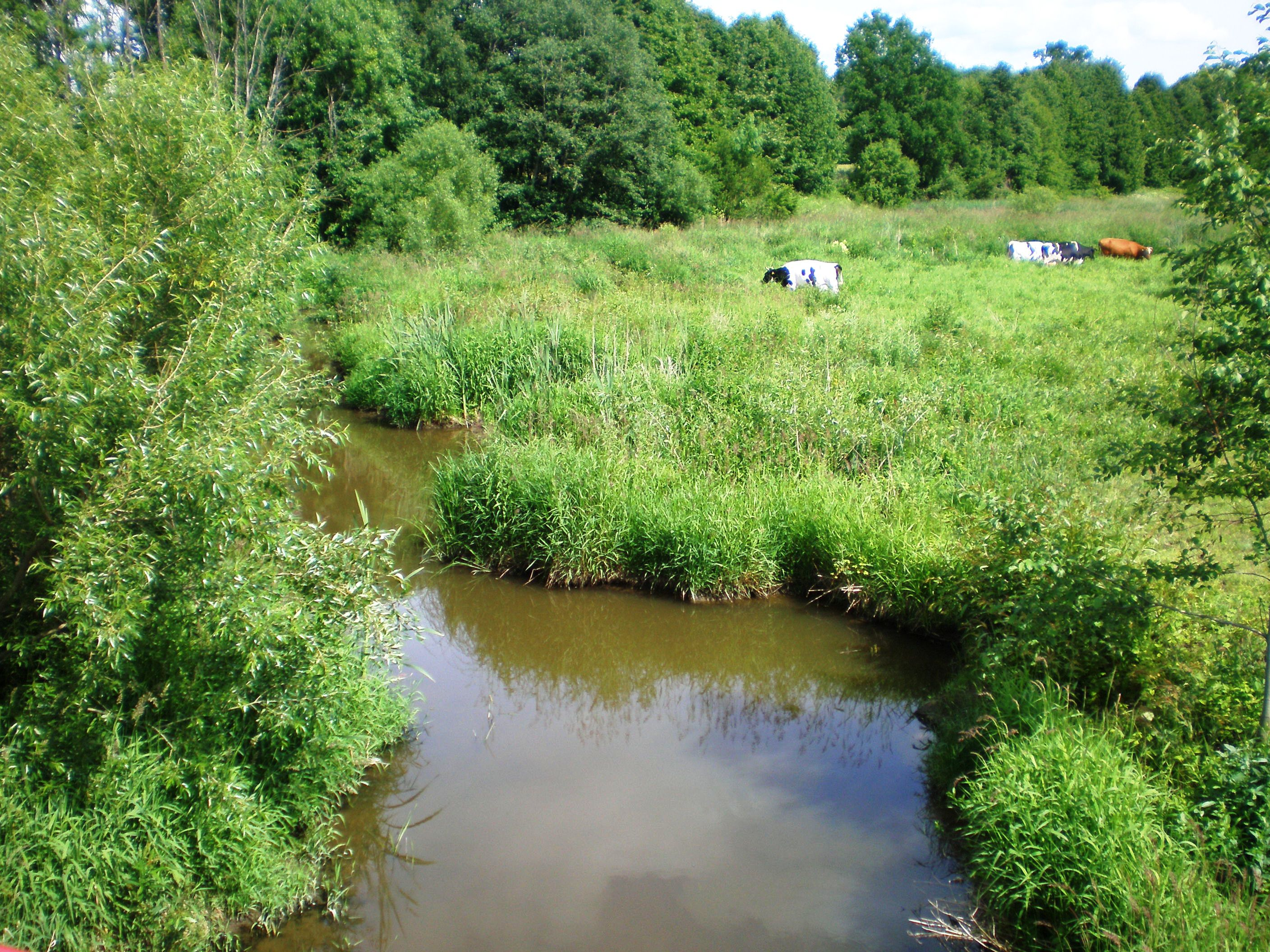

Location
- Country: Lithuania
- Region: Kėdainiai district municipality, Kaunas County

Physical characteristics
- Source
  - location: Jaugiliai
- Mouth: Smilga
  - coordinates: 55.3051°N 23.9129°E
- Length: 33.2 km (20.6 mi)
- Basin size: 61.8 km^{2} (23.9 sq mi)
- Discharge
  - average: 0.32 m³/s

Basin features
- Progression: Smilga→ Nevėžis→ Neman→ Baltic Sea
- Tributaries
  - left: Skroblė, Želtupys
  - right: Girotakis

The Jaugila is a river of Kėdainiai district municipality, Kaunas County, central Lithuania. It is a left tributary of the Smilga. It flows for 33 kilometres (21 mi) and has a basin area of 62 km^{2} (24 sq mi).

There is Urnėžiai dam and pond over the Jaugila river.
