= Kėdainiai City Eldership =

Kėdainiai City Eldership Kėdainių miesto seniūnija
- Eldership
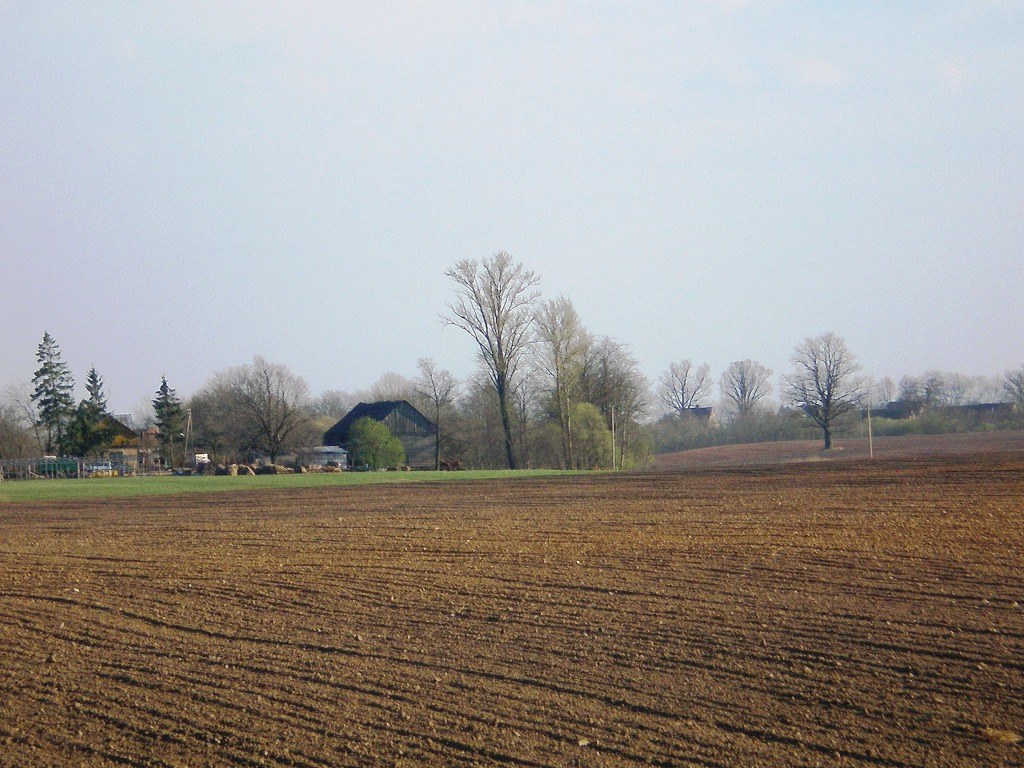
- Bogušiškiai village surroundings

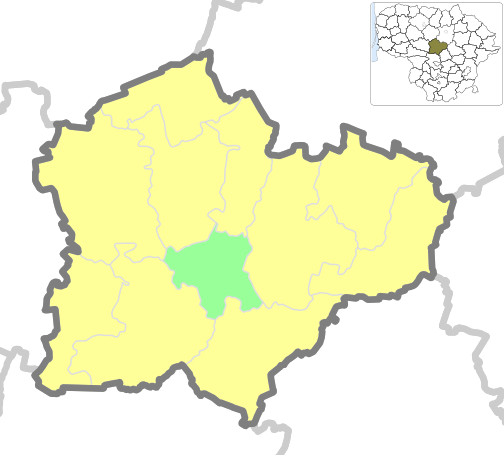
- Location of Kėdainiai city eldership
- Country: Lithuania
- Ethnographic region: Aukštaitija
- County: Kaunas County
- Municipality: Kėdainiai District Municipality
- Administrative centre: Kėdainiai

Area
  - Total: 44 km^{2} (17 sq mi)

Population (2011)
  - Total: 27,647
  - Density: 630/km^{2} (1,600/sq mi)
- Time zone: UTC+2 (EET)
  - Summer (DST): UTC+3 (EEST)

Kėdainiai City Eldership (Lithuanian: Kėdainių miesto seniūnija) is a Lithuanian eldership, located in a central part of Kėdainiai District Municipality. It covers the city of Kėdainiai, which is its administrative seat, and surrounding areas.

== History ==
Eldership was created at 2001, when former Kėdainiai City Eldership and part of the Kėdainiai Rural Eldership where merged.

== Geography ==
All the territory is in Nevėžis plain.

- Rivers: Nevėžis, Smilga, Jaugila, Dotnuvėlė, Obelis, Smilgaitis;
- Lakes and ponds: Keleriškiai pond, Kėdainiai pond, Babėnai pond;
- Forests: Josvainiai forest, Babėnai park, Daumantai forest;
- Protected areas: Smilga and Smilgaitis landscape sanctuary, Dotnuvėlė landscape sanctuary.

== Populated places ==
Following settlements are located in the Kėdainiai City Eldership (as for 2011 census):

- Cities: Kėdainiai
- Villages: Bartkūniškiai · Bogušiškiai · Daukšiai · Daumantai · Janušava · Justinava · Kėboniai · Keleriškiai · Kropilai · Lipliūnai · Mantviloniai · Mištautai · Novočėbė · Pasmilgys · Pikeliai · Pūstelninkai · Ruminiai · Ruoščiai · Stasiūnai · Šiukštuliškiai · Šventoniškis · Tubiai · Varėnai · Varkoliai;
- Hamlets: Čeplinava · Klamputė.
