= Daukšiai =

Daukšiai may refer to:

- Daukšiai (Kaunas County), a village in Kaunas County, Lithuania
- Daukšiai (Marijampolė County), a town in Marijampolė County, Lithuania
