= Urnėžiai, Kėdainiai =

Urnėžiai
- Village
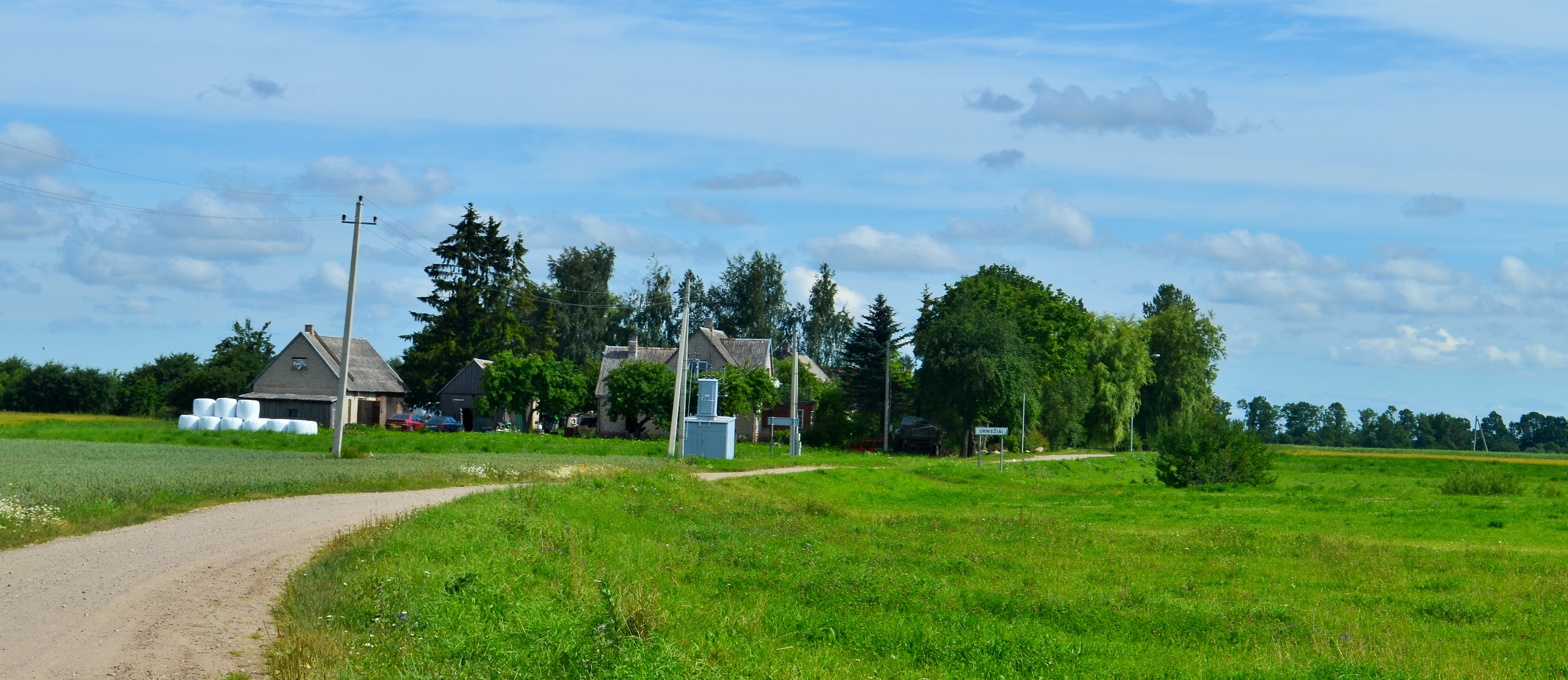

- Location in Lithuania
- Coordinates: 55°20′49″N 23°53′31″E
- Country: Lithuania
- County: Kaunas County
- Municipality: Kėdainiai district municipality
- Eldership: Dotnuva Eldership

Population (2011)
  - Total: 51
- Time zone: UTC+2 (EET)
  - Summer (DST): UTC+3 (EEST)

Urnėžiai (formerly Polish: Urniaże, Russian: Урняжи) is a village in Kėdainiai district municipality, in Kaunas County, in central Lithuania. According to the 2011 census, the village has a population of 51 people. It is located 2 km (1.2 mi) from Dotnuva between the Vištupis and Jaugila rivers. There is a cemetery.

Urnėžiai manor was mentioned for the first time in 1581.

== Demography ==
Historical population

Year	Pop.	±% p.a.
1866	220	—
1902	240	+0.24%
1923	246	+0.12%
1959	138	−1.59%

Year	Pop.	±% p.a.
1970	93	−3.52%
1979	55	−5.67%
1987	51	−0.94%
1989	41	−10.34%

Year	Pop.	±% p.a.
2001	39	−0.42%
2011	51	+2.72%

Source: 1902, 1923, 1959 & 1970, 1979, 1989, 2001, 2011
