= Varkoliai =

- Village
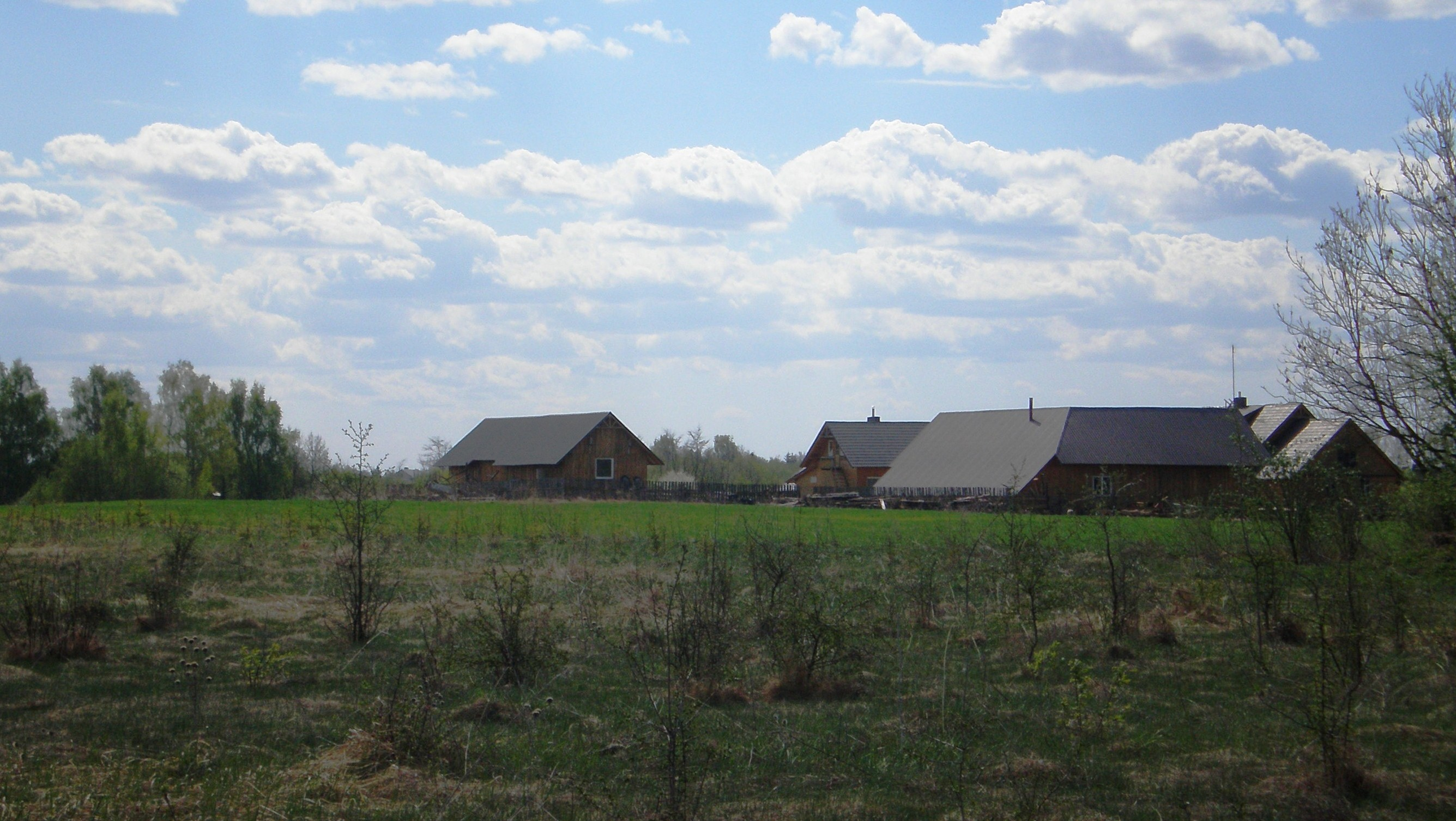

- Location in Lithuania
- Coordinates: 55°18′05″N 23°57′20″E
- Country: Lithuania
- County: Kaunas County
- Municipality: Kėdainiai district municipality
- Eldership: Kėdainiai City Eldership

Population (2011)
  - Total: 0
- Time zone: UTC+2 (EET)
  - Summer (DST): UTC+3 (EEST)

Varkoliai (historically Russian: Варколе) is a village in Kėdainiai district municipality, in Kaunas County, in central Lithuania. It is located by the western limit of the Kėdainiai city and Smilga river, nearby the Kėdainiai Air Base. According to the 2011 census, the village has a population of 0 people.

== Demography ==
Historical population

Year	Pop.	±% p.a.
1902	50	—
1923	32	−2.10%
1959	19	−1.44%
1970	13	−3.39%

Year	Pop.	±% p.a.
1979	7	−6.65%
1989	0	−100.00%
2001	5	—
2011	0	−100.00%

Source: 1902, 1923, 1959 & 1970, 1979, 1989, 2001, 2011
