= Pikeliai, Kėdainiai =

Pikeliai
- Village
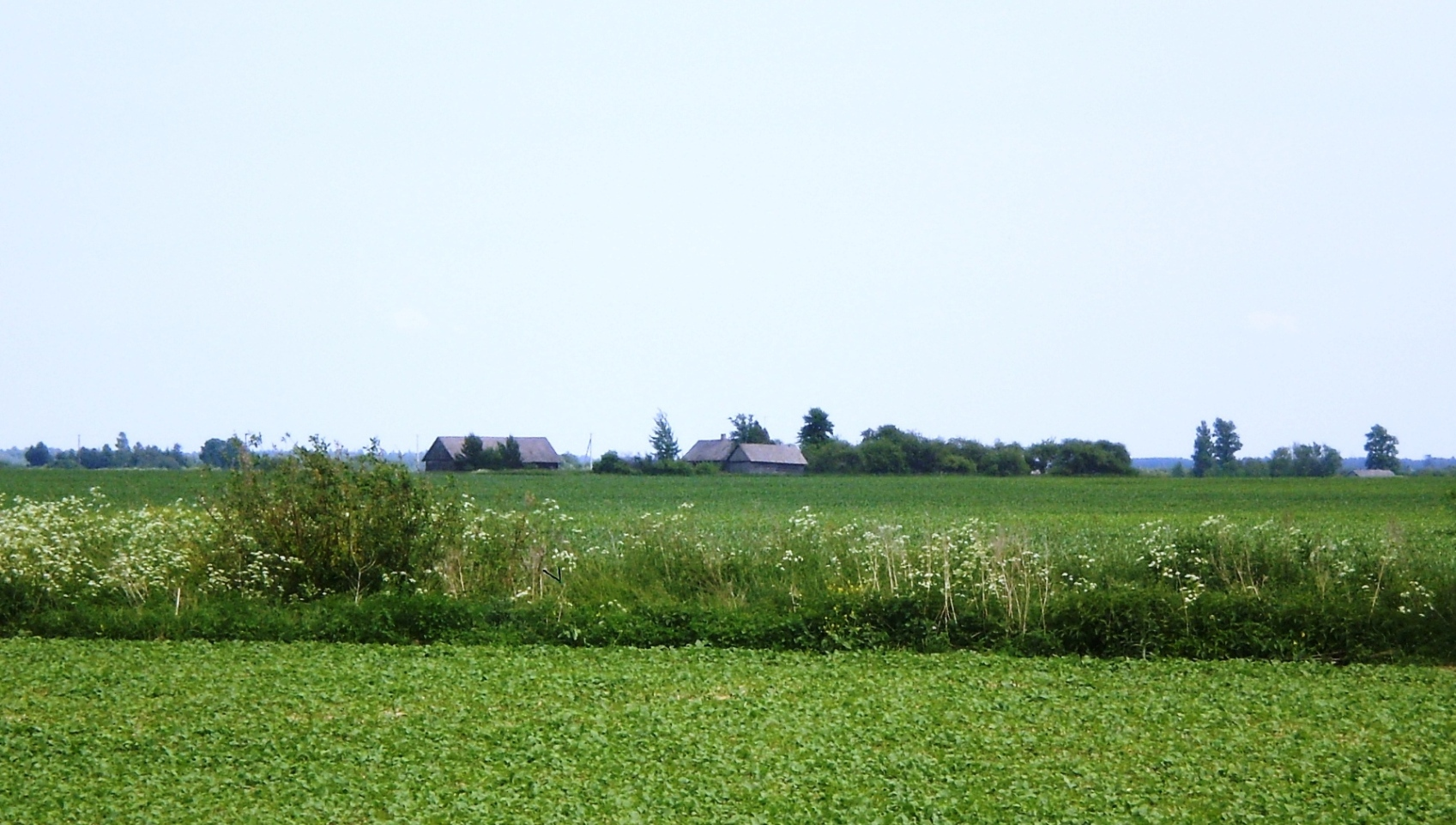

- Location in Lithuania
- Coordinates: 55°19′32″N 23°52′42″E
- Country: Lithuania
- County: Kaunas County
- Municipality: Kėdainiai district municipality
- Eldership: Kėdainiai City Eldership

Population (2011)
  - Total: 21
- Time zone: UTC+2 (EET)
  - Summer (DST): UTC+3 (EEST)

Pikeliai is a village in Kėdainiai district municipality, in Kaunas County, central Lithuania. It is located nearby the Jaugila river. According to the 2011 census, the village has a population of 21 people.

== Demography ==
Historical population

Year	Pop.	±% p.a.
1902	23	—
1923	14	−2.34%
1959	28	+1.94%
1970	14	−6.11%

Year	Pop.	±% p.a.
1979	10	−3.67%
1989	8	−2.21%
2001	10	+1.88%
2011	21	+7.70%

Source: 1902, 1923, 1959 & 1970, 1979, 1989, 2001, 2011
