= Mištautai =

- Village
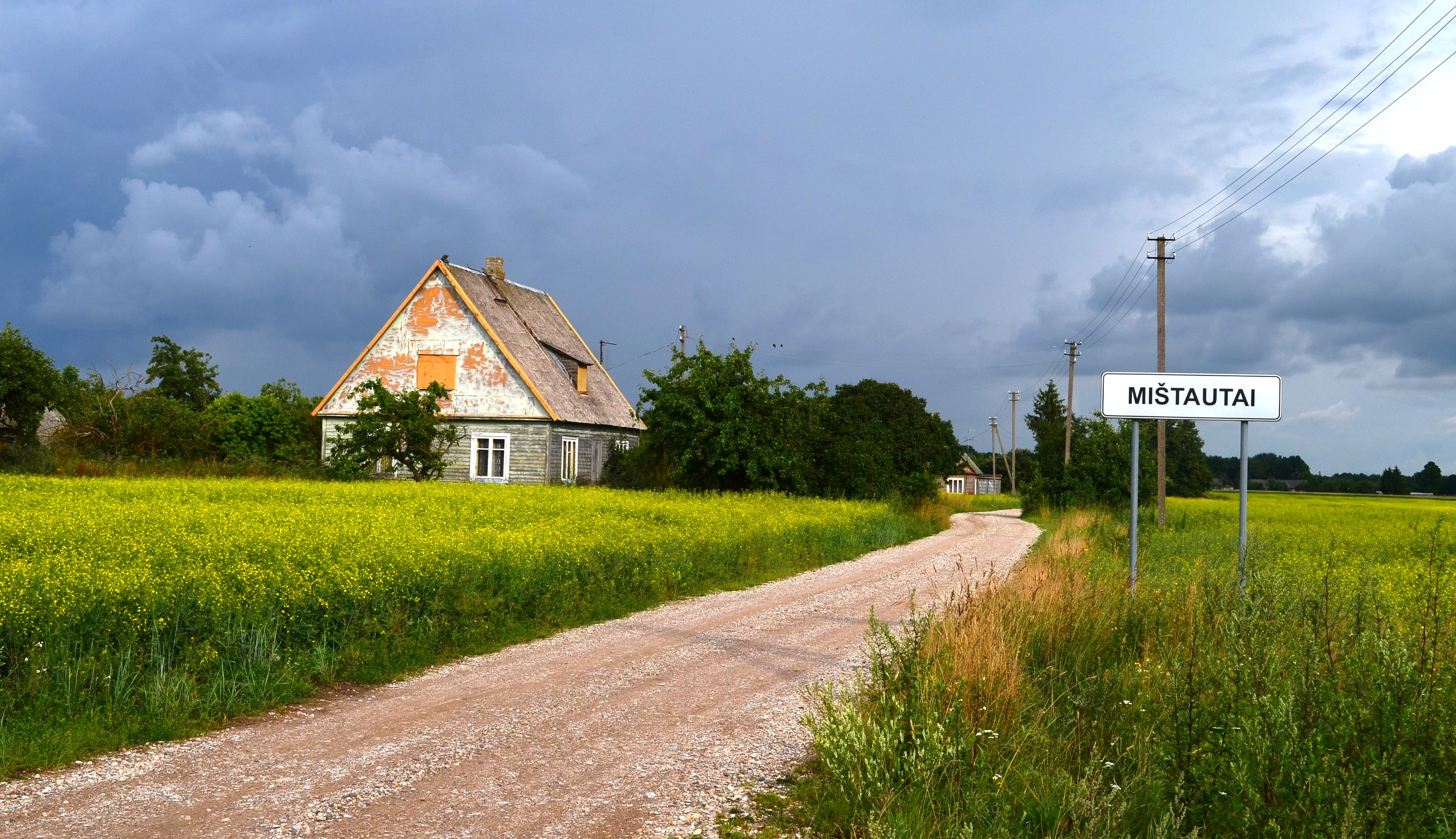

- Location in Lithuania
- Coordinates: 55°19′0″N 23°53′0″E
- Country: Lithuania
- County: Kaunas County
- Municipality: Kėdainiai
- Eldership: Kėdainiai City Eldership

Population (2011)
  - Total: 18
- Time zone: UTC+2 (EET)
  - Summer (DST): UTC+3 (EEST)

Mištautai is a village in Kėdainiai district municipality, in Kaunas County, in central Lithuania. It is located by the Jaugila river. According to the 2011 census, the village has a population of 18.

== Demography ==
Historical population

Year	Pop.	±% p.a.
1902	152	—
1923	175	+0.67%
1959	118	−1.09%
1970	103	−1.23%

Year	Pop.	±% p.a.
1979	47	−8.35%
1989	39	−1.85%
2001	29	−2.44%
2011	18	−4.66%

Source: 1902, 1923, 1959 & 1970, 1979, 1989, 2001, 2011
