= Šventoniškis =

- Village
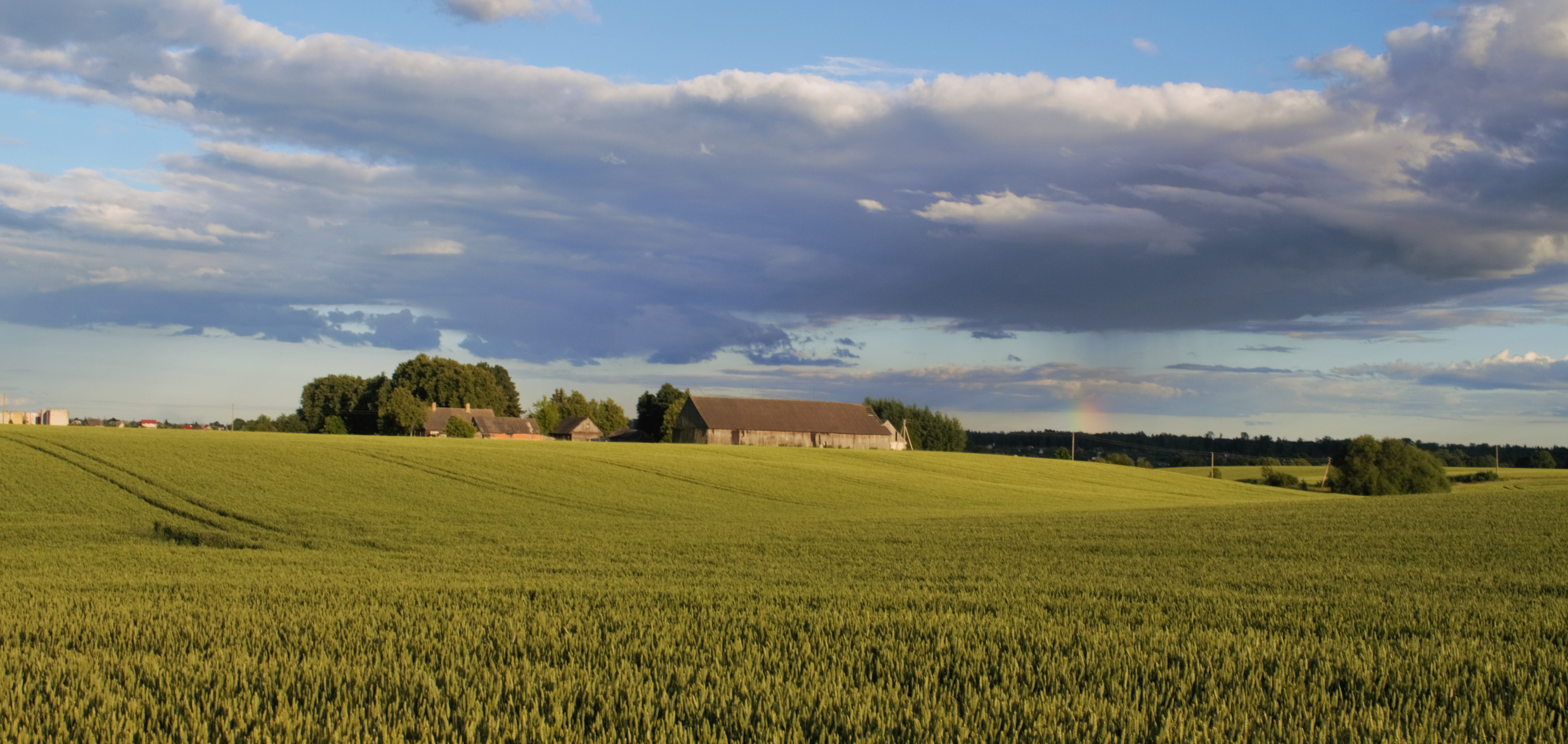

- Location in Lithuania
- Coordinates: 55°15′15″N 23°56′30″E
- Country: Lithuania
- County: Kaunas County
- Municipality: Kėdainiai district municipality
- Eldership: Kėdainiai City Eldership

Population (2011)
  - Total: 6
- Time zone: UTC+2 (EET)
  - Summer (DST): UTC+3 (EEST)

Šventoniškis is a village in Kėdainiai district municipality, in Kaunas County, central Lithuania. It is located nearby the Nevėžis river. According to the 2011 census, the village has a population of 6 people.

== Demography ==
Historical population

Year	Pop.	±% p.a.
1902	8	—
1923	34	+7.13%
1959	54	+1.29%
1970	26	−6.43%

Year	Pop.	±% p.a.
1979	85	+14.07%
1989	12	−17.78%
2001	13	+0.67%
2011	6	−7.44%

Source: 1902, 1923, 1959 & 1970, 1979, 1989, 2001, 2011
