= Justinava, Kėdainiai =

Justinava
- Village
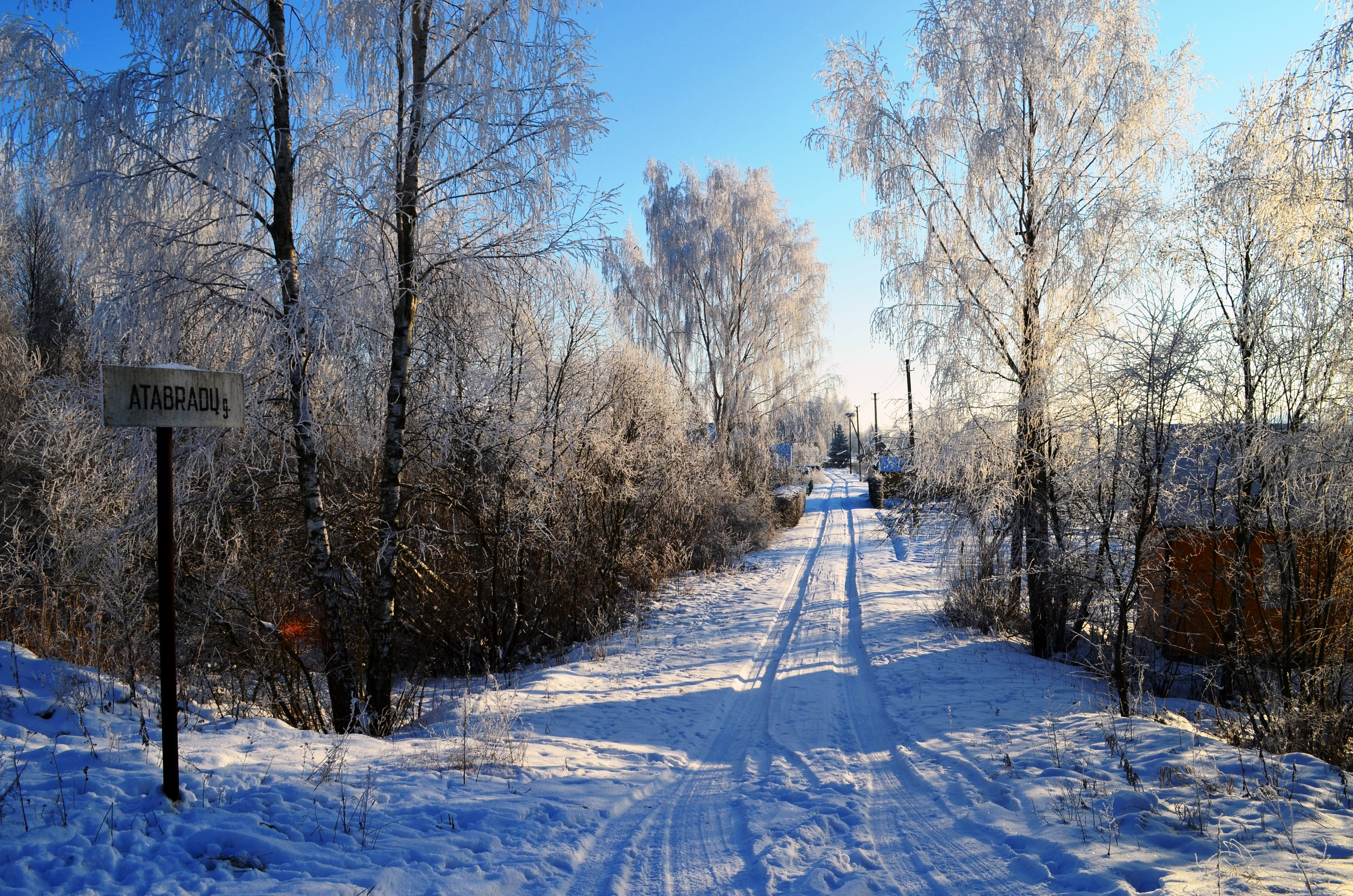

- Location in Lithuania Justinava (Lithuania)
- Coordinates: 55°19′48″N 24°00′11″E
- Country: Lithuania
- County: Kaunas County
- Municipality: Kėdainiai district municipality
- Eldership: Kėdainiai City Eldership

Population (2011)
  - Total: 7
- Time zone: UTC+2 (EET)
  - Summer (DST): UTC+3 (EEST)

Justinava (historically Polish: Ustinowo) is a village in Kėdainiai district municipality, in Kaunas County, central Lithuania. It is located by the northern limits of the Kėdainiai city, nearby the Nevėžis river and Babėnai forest. According to the 2011 census, the village has a population of 7 people.

== History ==
At the beginning of the 20th century it was a sparsely populated estate area. During Soviet era Justinava became a collective gardening area and was merged to Kėdainiai. Only a small part in the northern end remained as a village.

== Demography ==
Historical population
Year	Pop.	±% p.a.
1923	19	—
2001	0	−100.00%
2011	7	—
Source: 1902, 1923, 1959 & 1970, 1979, 1989, 2001, 2011
