= Daumantai =

- Village
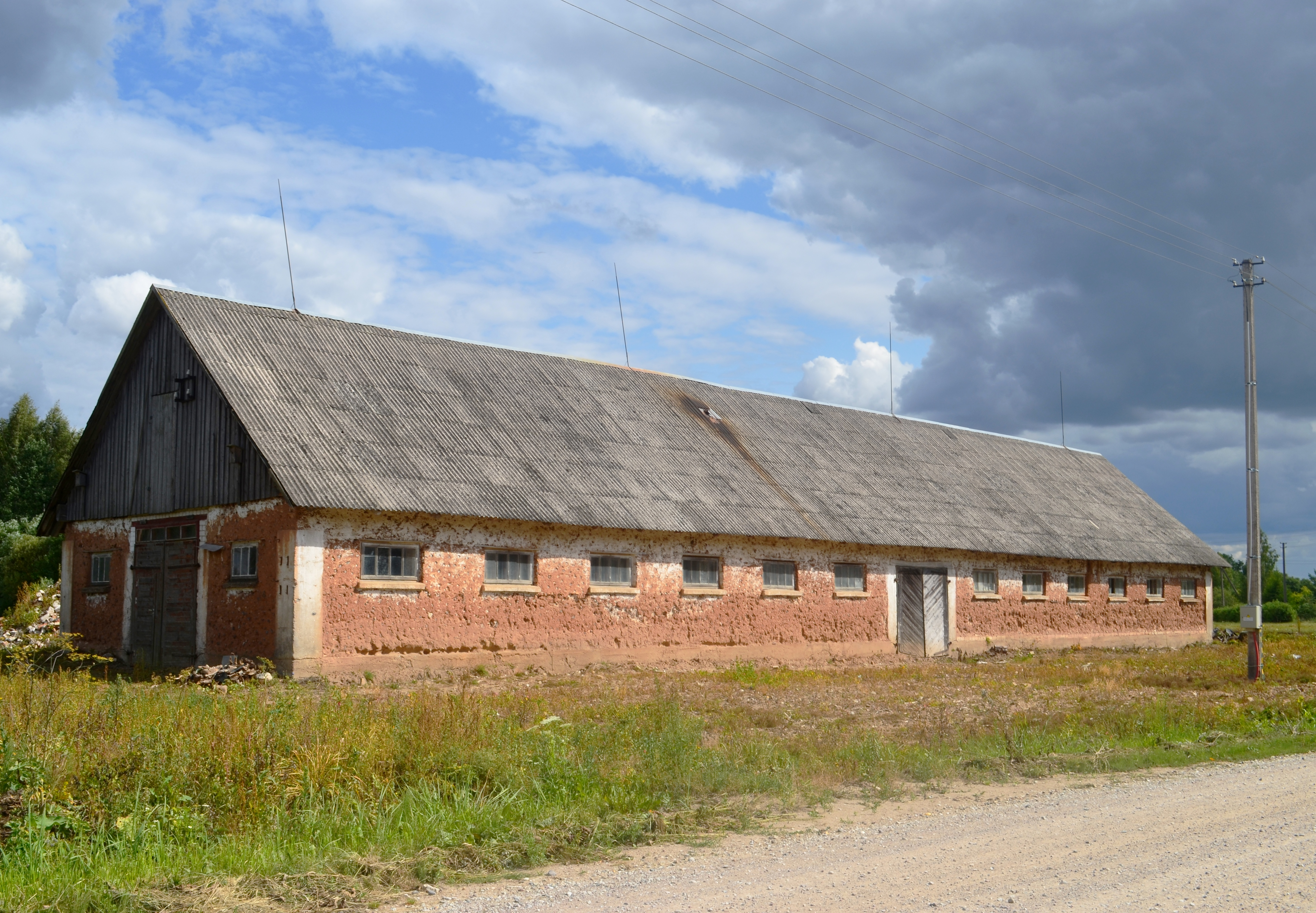

- Location in Lithuania
- Coordinates: 55°20′31″N 23°57′11″E
- Country: Lithuania
- County: Kaunas County
- Municipality: Kėdainiai district municipality
- Eldership: Kėdainiai City Eldership

Population (2011)
  - Total: 80
- Time zone: UTC+2 (EET)
  - Summer (DST): UTC+3 (EEST)

Daumantai is a village in Kėdainiai district municipality, in Kaunas County, central Lithuania. It is located by the Dotnuvėlė river and Vilnius-Šiauliai railway. According to the 2011 census, the village has a population of 80 people.

Till the beginning of the 20 century it was okolica szlachecka. During Soviet times Daumantai was converted to the communal gardening area.

== Demography ==
Historical population

Year	Pop.	±% p.a.
1902	93	—
1959	96	+0.06%
1970	75	−2.22%
1979	45	−5.52%

Year	Pop.	±% p.a.
1989	21	−7.34%
2001	47	+6.94%
2011	80	+5.46%

Source: 1902, 1923, 1959 & 1970, 1979, 1989, 2001, 2011
