= Čeplinava =

- Hamlet
- Location in Lithuania
- Coordinates: 55°14′35″N 23°55′13″E
- Country: Lithuania
- County: Kaunas County
- Municipality: Kėdainiai district municipality
- Eldership: Kėdainiai City Eldership

Population (2011)
  - Total: 0
- Time zone: UTC+2 (EET)
  - Summer (DST): UTC+3 (EEST)

Čeplinava (historically Russian: Чаплиново) is a hamlet in Kėdainiai district municipality, in Kaunas County, in central Lithuania. It is located by the Nevėžis river, 6 km from Kėdainiai. According to the 2011 census, the hamlet has a population of 0 people.

The hamlet was depopulated after 1979 (the last census data with population being detected).

== Demography ==
Historical population

Year	Pop.	±% p.a.
1902	14	—
1923	22	+2.18%
1959	23	+0.12%
1970	14	−4.41%

Year	Pop.	±% p.a.
1979	3	−15.73%
1989	0	−100.00%
2001	0	0.00%
2011	0	0.00%

Source: 1902, 1923, 1959 & 1970, 1979, 1989, 2001, 2011
