= Janušava, Kėdainiai =

Janušava
- Village
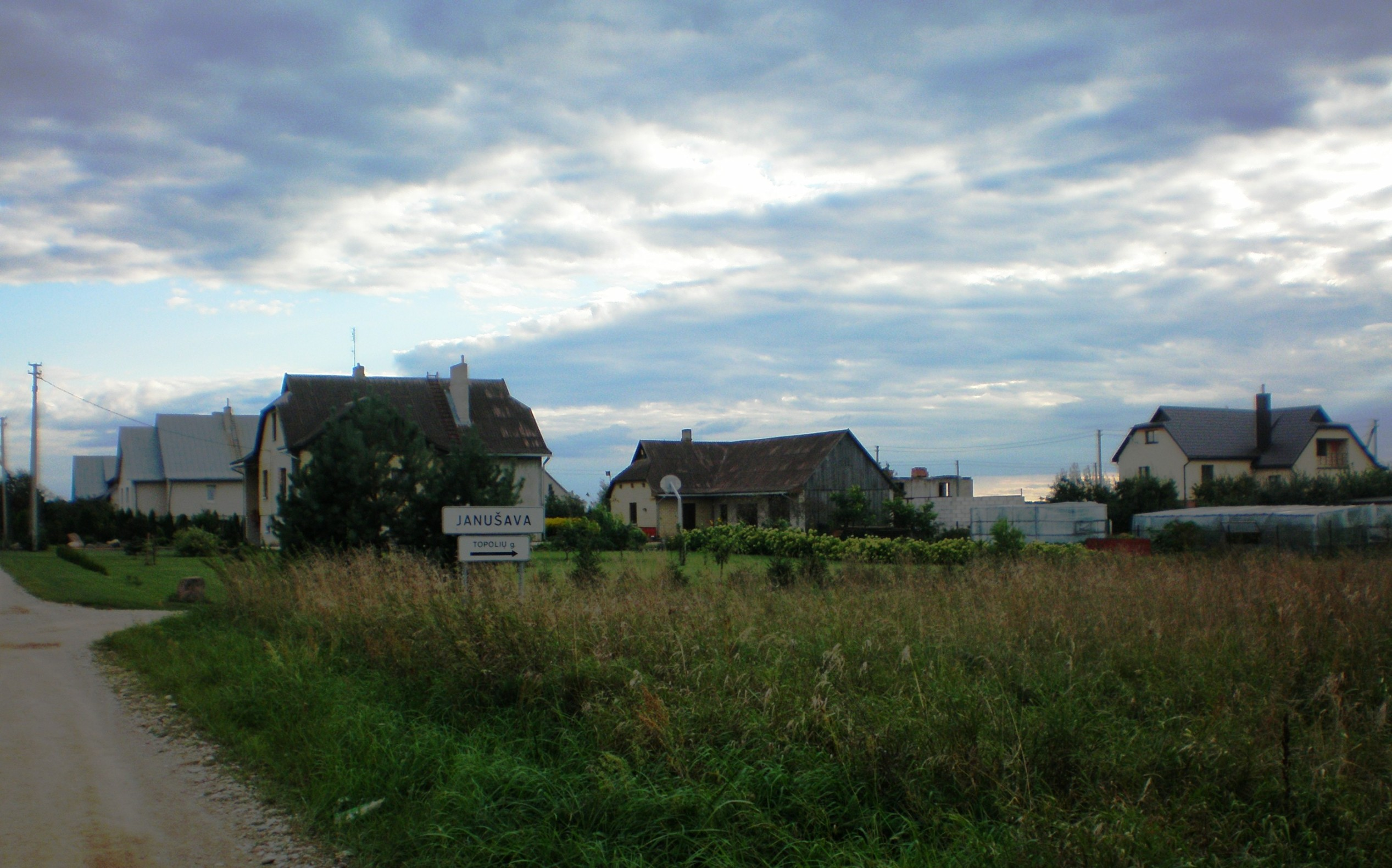

- Location in Lithuania Janušava (Lithuania)
- Coordinates: 55°17′25″N 23°56′40″E
- Country: Lithuania
- County: Kaunas County
- Municipality: Kėdainiai District Municipality
- Eldership: Kėdainiai City Eldership

Population (2011)
  - Total: 44
- Time zone: UTC+2 (EET)
  - Summer (DST): UTC+3 (EEST)

Janušava (or Jonušava, historically Polish: Januszewo, Januszów) is a village in Kėdainiai District Municipality, in Kaunas County, central Lithuania. It is located by the western limits of the Kėdainiai city, nearby the Smilga and Klamputis rivers. According to the 2011 census, the village had a population of 44 people.

== History ==
At the 17th century, Krzysztof Radziwiłł, who was a notable magnate of Kėdainiai, created a new settlement at the western side of Kėdainiai. It was named after his son Janusz Radziwiłł. The settlement had a marketplace and a Lutheran church. Januszowo was mainly a German settlement settled by immigrants from Prussia and Saxony. For a period between 1648 and 1795, it was de facto a distinct city with its own coat of arms and a seal.

Under the Russian Empire, it was merged into Kėdainiai, except from the village area at the western end. This part was an okolica in the Josvainiai parish. During the Soviet times, most of Janušava village was again merged into Kėdainiai, except from a small suburban area.

== Demography ==
Historical population

Year	Pop.	±% p.a.
1902	291	—
1959	178	−0.86%
1970	344	+6.17%
1979	241	−3.88%

Year	Pop.	±% p.a.
1989	203	−1.70%
2001	16	−19.08%
2011	44	+10.65%

Source: 1902, 1923, 1959 & 1970, 1979, 1989, 2001, 2011

== Gallery ==
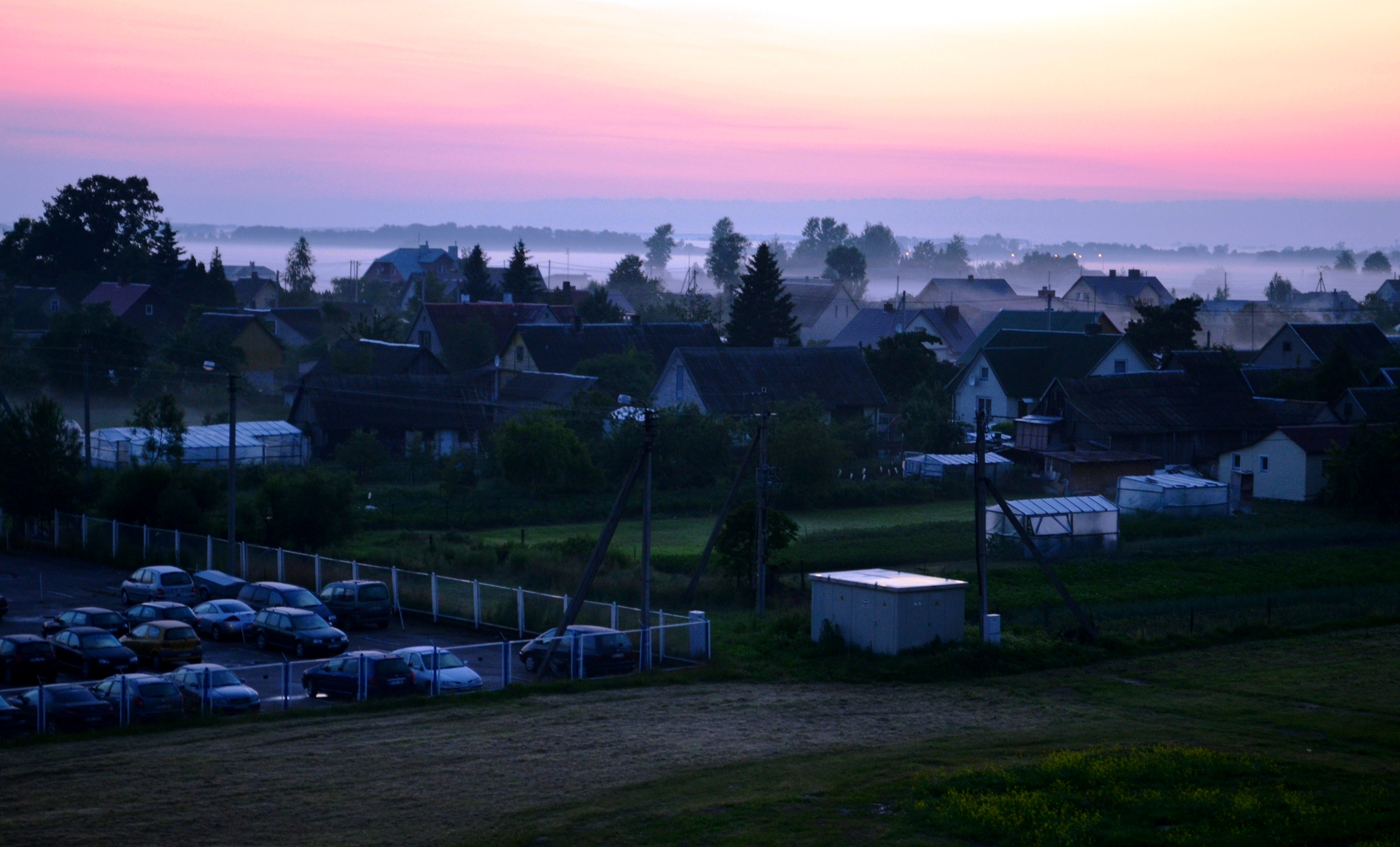
The Old Janušava (nowadays part of Kėdainiai)

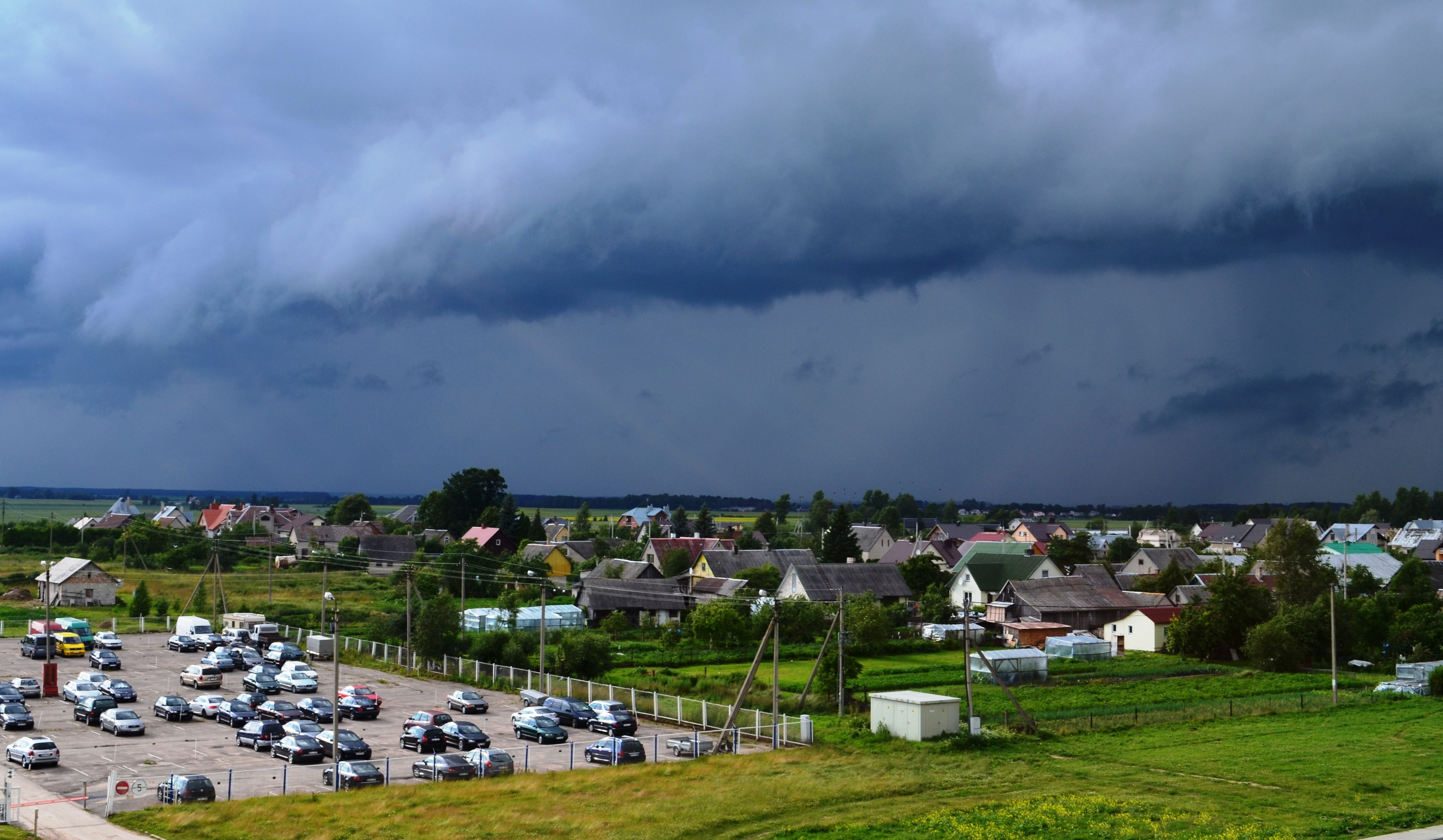
The Old Janušava

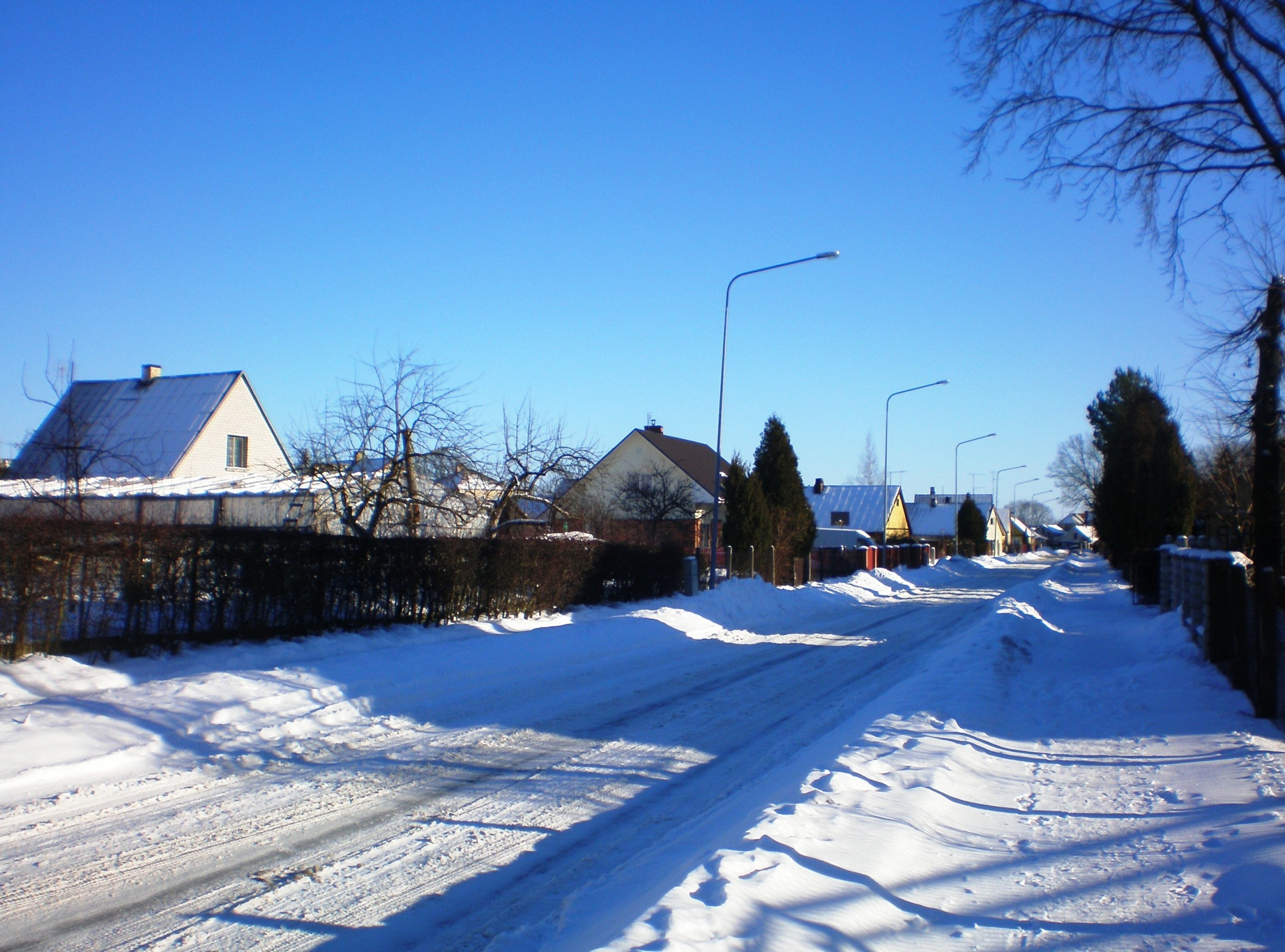
The Old Janušava

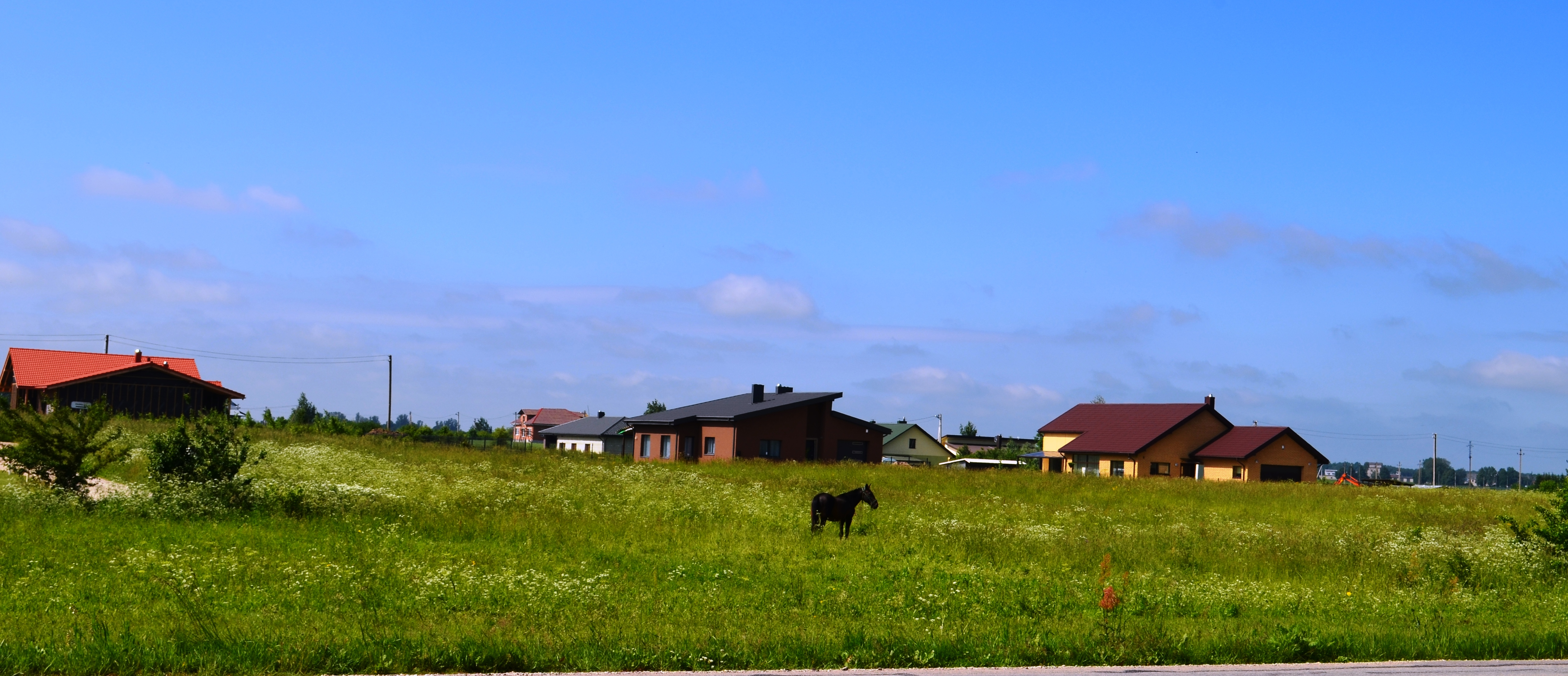
The New Janušava (village)
