= Bogušiškiai, Kėdainiai =

Bogušiškiai
- Village
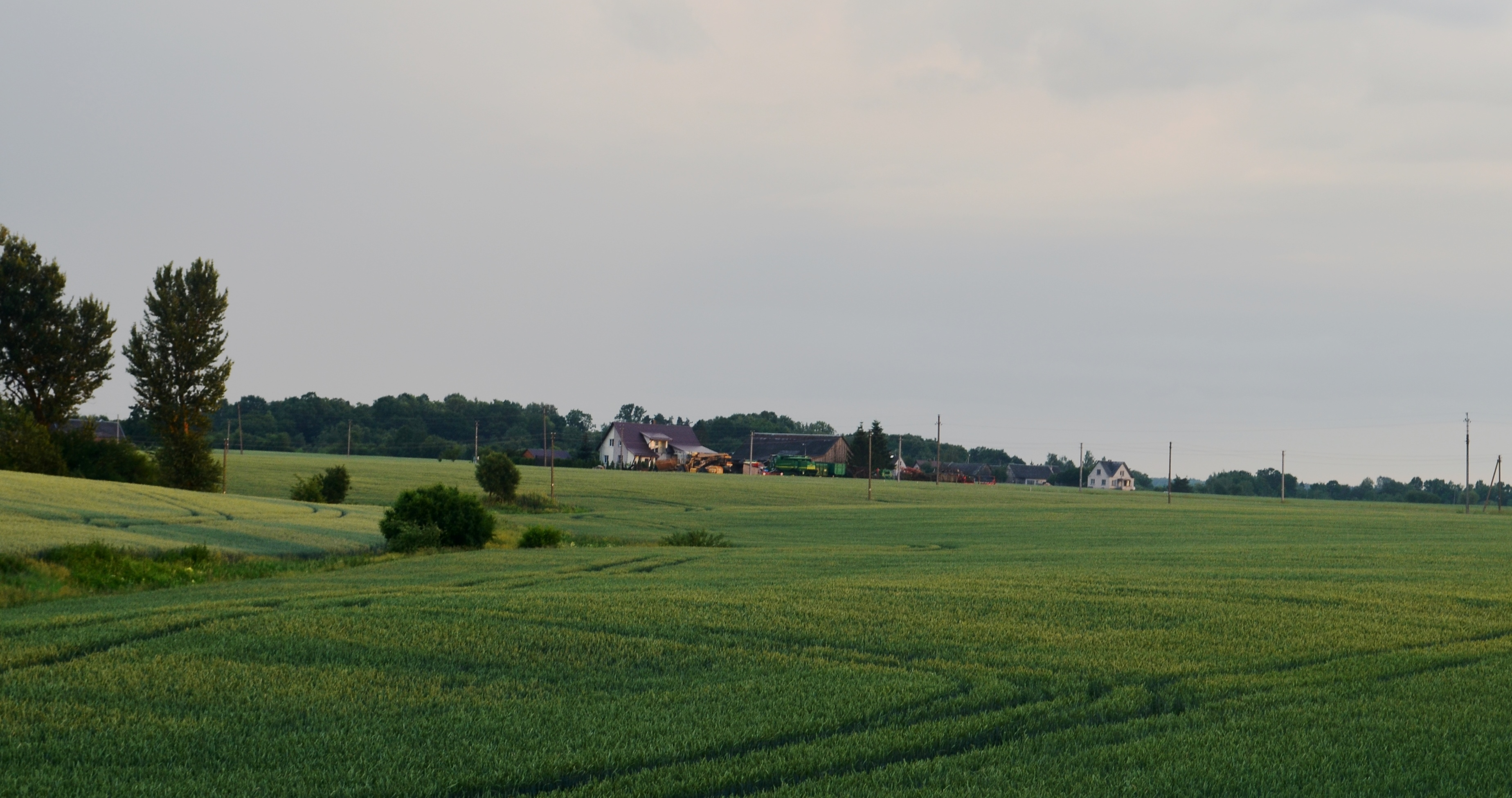

- Location in Lithuania
- Coordinates: 55°18′41″N 23°55′19″E
- Country: Lithuania
- County: Kaunas County
- Municipality: Kėdainiai district municipality
- Eldership: Kėdainiai City Eldership

Population (2011)
  - Total: 17
- Time zone: UTC+2 (EET)
  - Summer (DST): UTC+3 (EEST)

Bogušiškiai is a village in Kėdainiai district municipality, in Kaunas County, central Lithuania. It is located nearby Vištupis rivulet and Jonava-Šeduva road. According to the 2011 census, the village has a population of 17 people.

== Demography ==
Historical population

| Year | Pop. | ±% p.a. |
|---|---|---|
| 1902 | 31 | — |
| 1923 | 33 | +0.30% |
| 1959 | 13 | −2.55% |
| 1970 | 25 | +6.13% |

| Year | Pop. | ±% p.a. |
|---|---|---|
| 1979 | 18 | −3.58% |
| 1989 | 9 | −6.70% |
| 2001 | 11 | +1.69% |
| 2011 | 17 | +4.45% |

Source: 1902, 1923, 1959 & 1970, 1979, 1989, 2001, 2011
