= Kropilai =

- Village
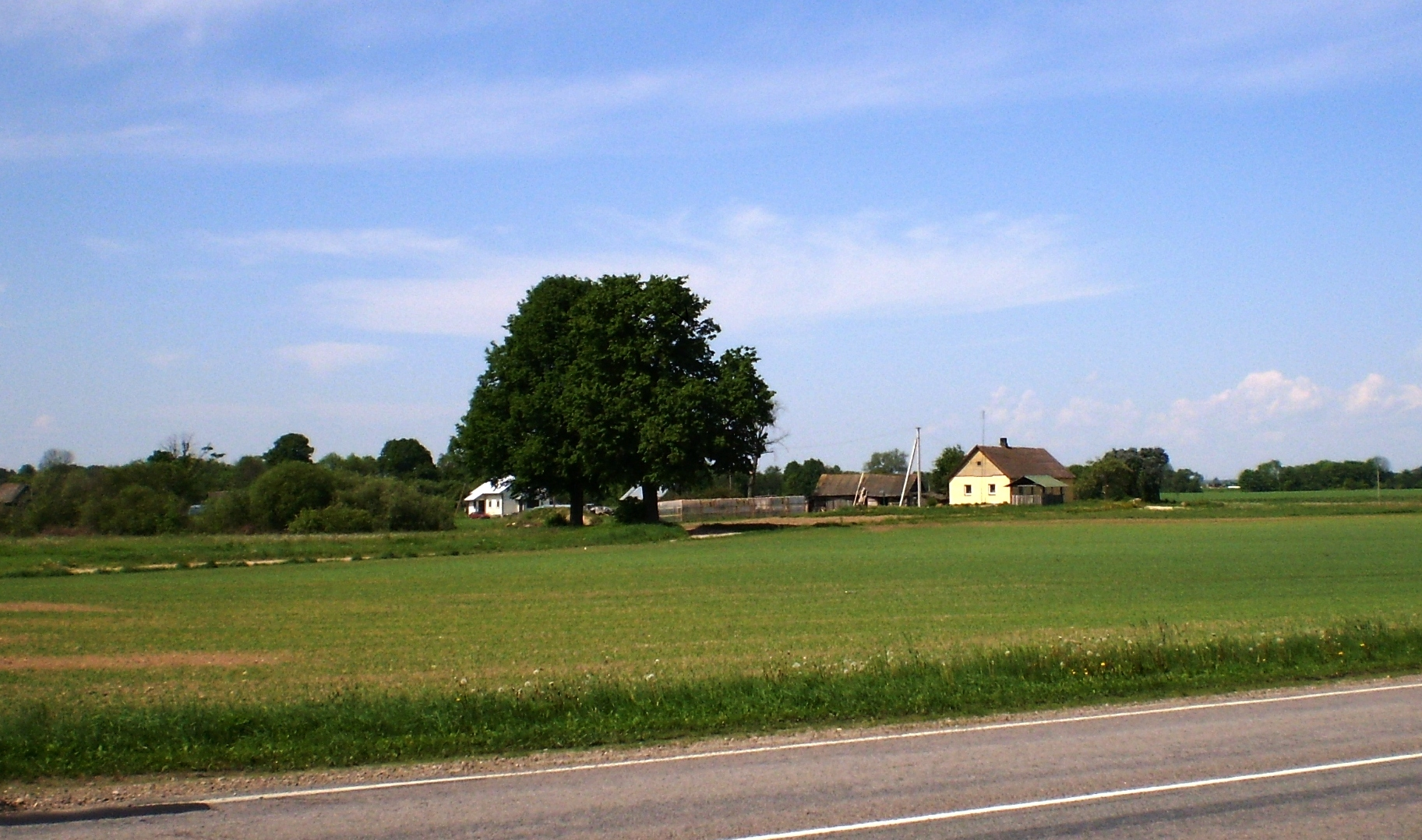

- Location in Lithuania
- Coordinates: 55°18′22″N 23°56′9″E
- Country: Lithuania
- County: Kaunas County
- Municipality: Kėdainiai district municipality
- Eldership: Kėdainiai City Eldership

Population (2011)
  - Total: 13
- Time zone: UTC+2 (EET)
  - Summer (DST): UTC+3 (EEST)

Kropilai is a village in Kėdainiai district municipality, in Kaunas County, in central Lithuania. It is located by the river Smilga and regional way Jonava-Šeduva (KK144). According to the 2011 census, the village has a population of 13 people.

== Demography ==
Historical population

Year	Pop.	±% p.a.
1902	46	—
1923	45	−0.10%
1959	44	−0.06%
1970	44	+0.00%

Year	Pop.	±% p.a.
1979	13	−12.67%
1989	6	−7.44%
2001	18	+9.59%
2011	13	−3.20%

Source: 1902, 1923, 1959 & 1970, 1979, 1989, 2001, 2011
