= Novočėbė =

- Village
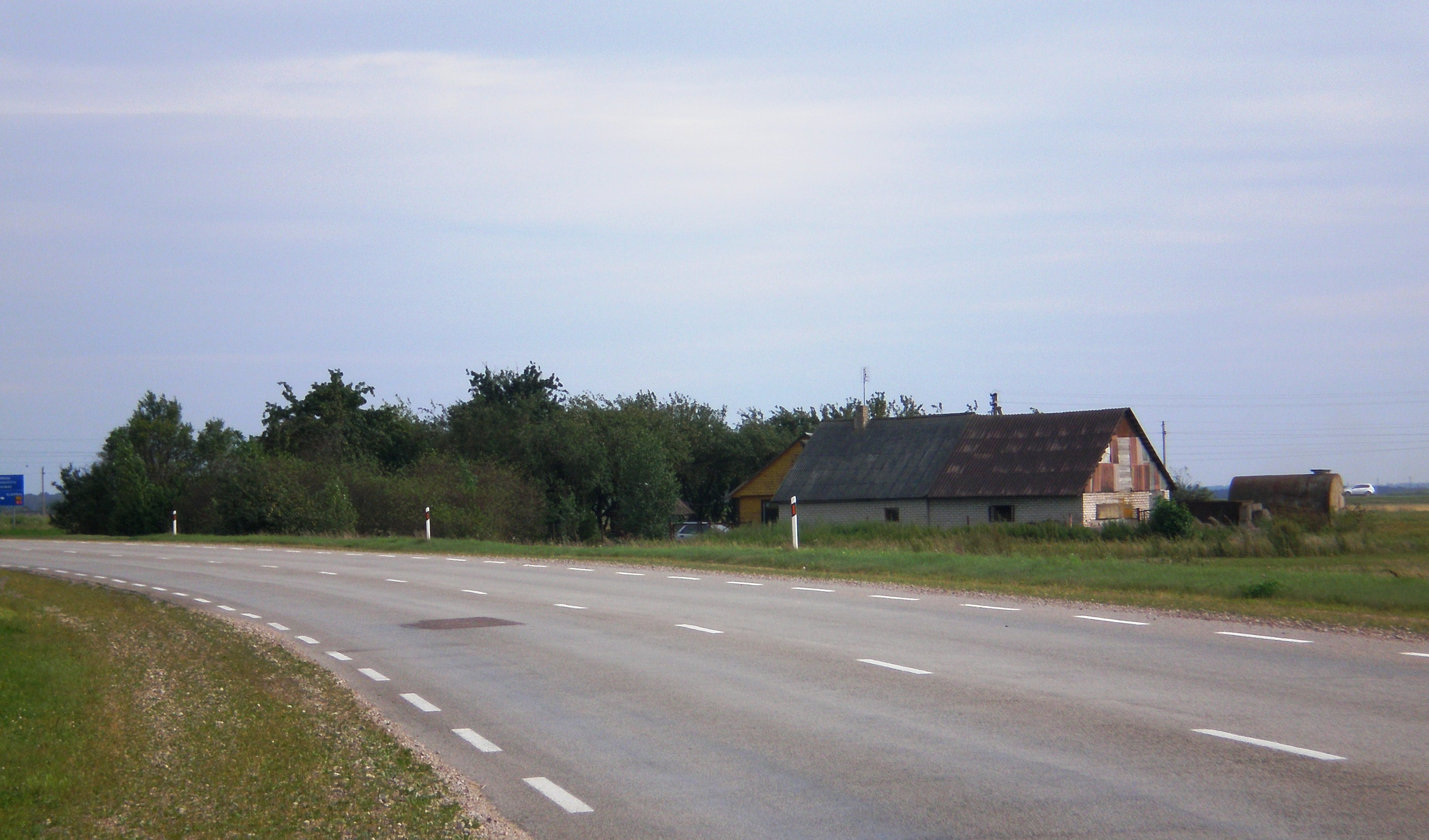

- Location in Lithuania Novočėbė (Lithuania)
- Coordinates: 55°16′14″N 23°54′27″E
- Country: Lithuania
- County: Kaunas County
- Municipality: Kėdainiai district municipality
- Eldership: Kėdainiai City Eldership

Population (2011)
  - Total: 1
- Time zone: UTC+2 (EET)
  - Summer (DST): UTC+3 (EEST)

Novočėbė is a village in Kėdainiai district municipality, in Kaunas County, central Lithuania. It is located by the Kėdainiai city southern limit, nearby road junction (Jonava-Šeduva and Aristava-Kėdainiai-Cinkiškiai routes). According to the 2011 census, the village has a population of 1 inhabitant.

== Demography ==
Historical population

Year	Pop.	±% p.a.
1923	130	—
1959	98	−0.78%
1970	38	−8.25%
1979	14	−10.50%

Year	Pop.	±% p.a.
1989	10	−3.31%
2001	4	−7.35%
2011	1	−12.94%

Source: 1902, 1923, 1959 & 1970, 1979, 1989, 2001, 2011
