= Pūstelninkai, Kėdainiai =

Pūstelninkai
- Village
- Location in Lithuania
- Coordinates: 55°17′0″N 23°51′0″E
- Country: Lithuania
- County: Kaunas County
- Municipality: Kėdainiai district municipality
- Eldership: Kėdainiai City Eldership

Population (2011)
  - Total: 0
- Time zone: UTC+2 (EET)
  - Summer (DST): UTC+3 (EEST)

Pūstelninkai (historically Polish: Pustelniki, Russian: Пустельники) is a village located in Kėdainiai district municipality, in Kaunas County, in central Lithuania. The village had a population of 0 people as of the 2011 census.

This village was abandoned during Soviet era land development projects and since then is inhabited (1970 was the last census year with population being detected).

== Demography ==
Historical population

Year	Pop.	±% p.a.
1902	124	—
1923	61	−3.32%
1959	57	−0.19%

Year	Pop.	±% p.a.
1970	44	−2.33%
2001	0	−100.00%
2011	0	0.00%

Source: 1902, 1923, 1959 & 1970, 1979, 1989, 2001, 2011
