= Klamputė =

- Hamlet
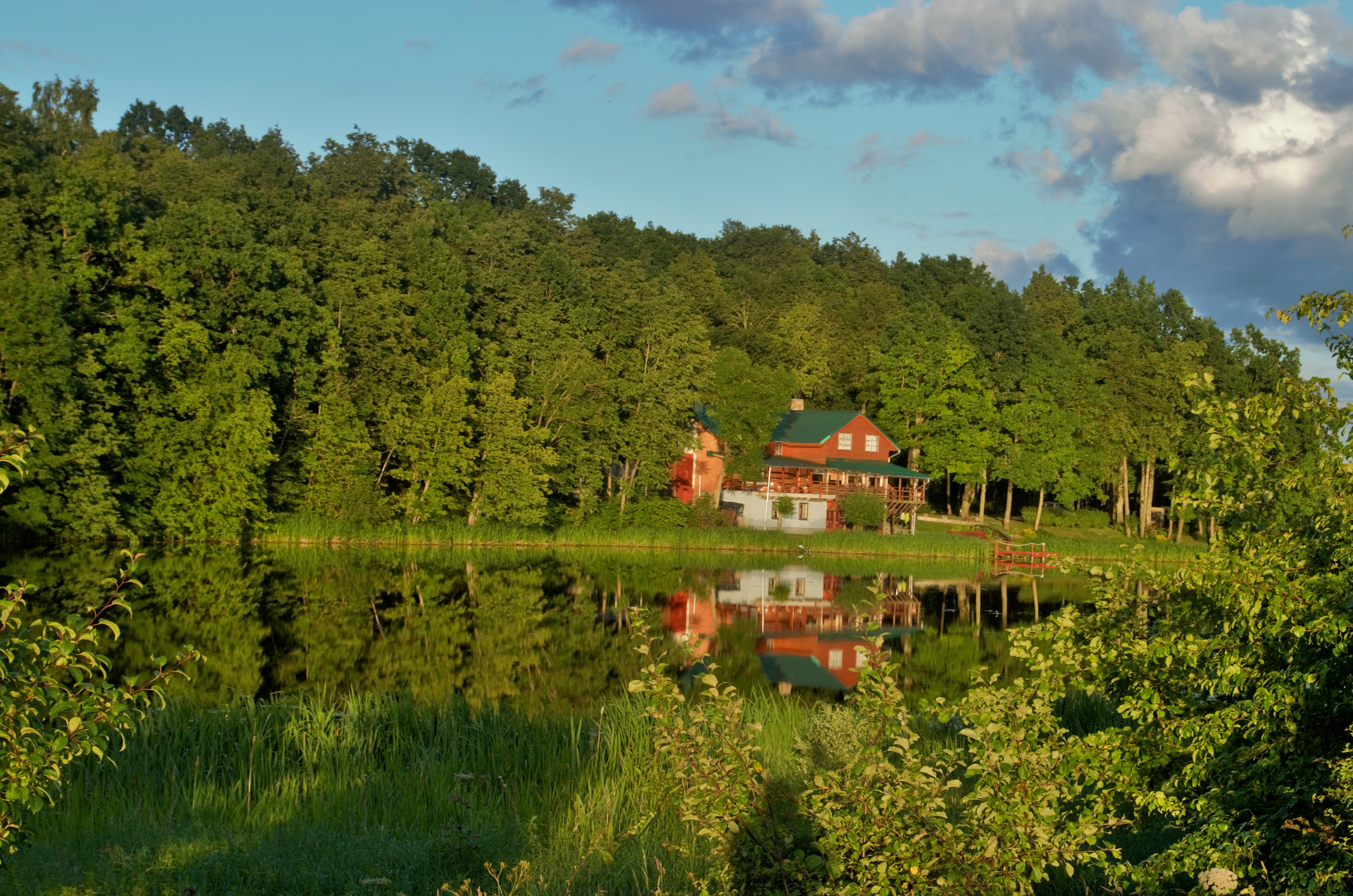

- Location in Lithuania
- Coordinates: 55°17′08″N 23°53′45″E
- Country: Lithuania
- County: Kaunas County
- Municipality: Kėdainiai district municipality
- Eldership: Kėdainiai City Eldership

Population (2011)
  - Total: 0
- Time zone: UTC+2 (EET)
  - Summer (DST): UTC+3 (EEST)

Klamputė is a hamlet in Kėdainiai district municipality, in Kaunas County, in central Lithuania. It is located by the Smilgaitis river and Keleriškiai pond, 3 km from Kėdainiai. According to the 2011 census, the hamlet has a population of 0 people.

The hamlet was depopulated after 1989 (the last census data with population being detected).

== Demography ==
Historical population

Year	Pop.	±% p.a.
1923	39	—
1959	30	−0.73%
1970	18	−4.54%
1979	5	−13.27%

Year	Pop.	±% p.a.
1989	2	−8.76%
2001	0	−100.00%
2011	0	0.00%

Source: 1902, 1923, 1959 & 1970, 1979, 1989, 2001, 2011
