= Mantviloniai =

- Village
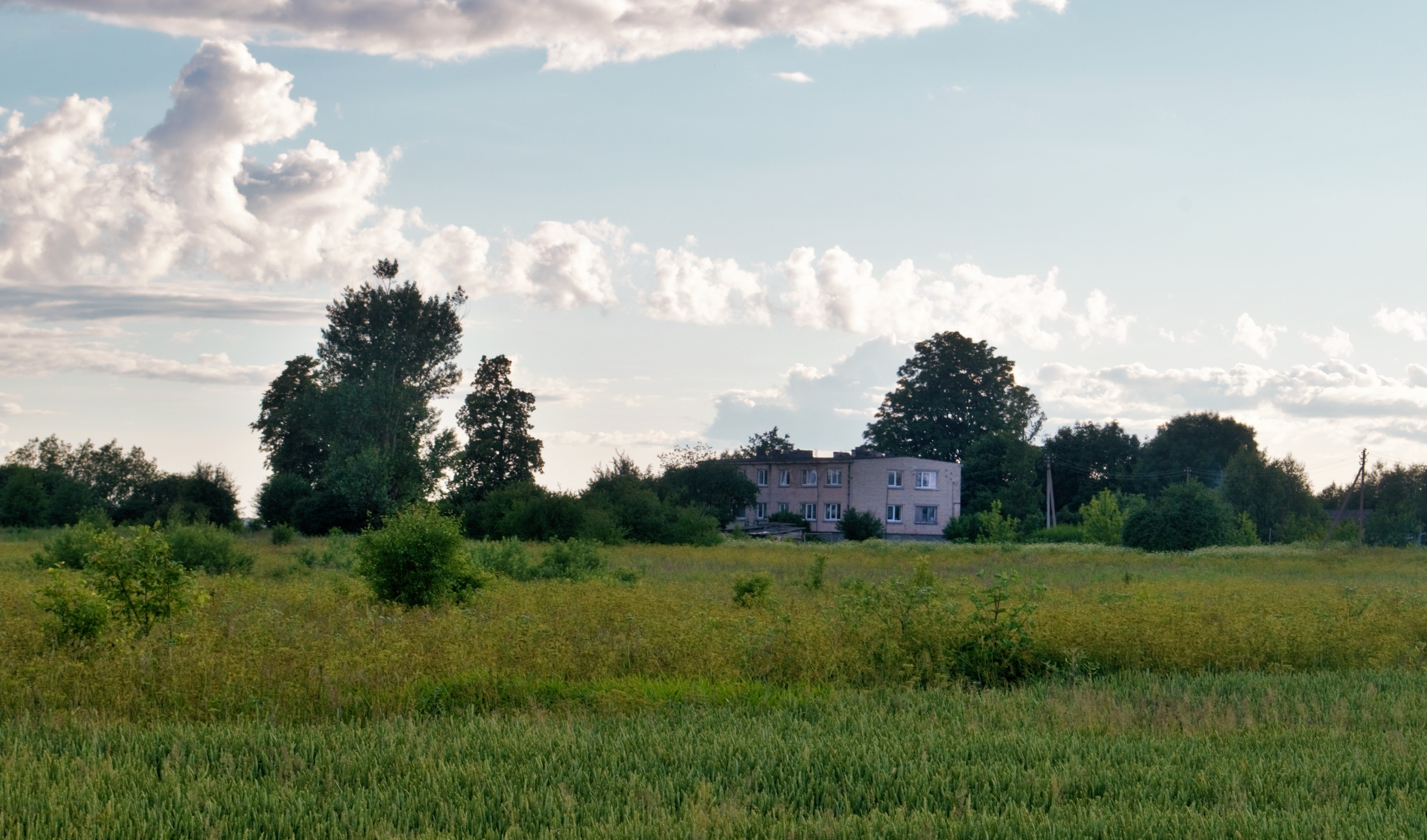

- Location in Lithuania Mantviloniai (Lithuania)
- Coordinates: 55°15′15″N 23°55′53″E
- Country: Lithuania
- County: Kaunas County
- Municipality: Kėdainiai district municipality
- Eldership: Kėdainiai City Eldership

Population (2011)
  - Total: 19
- Time zone: UTC+2 (EET)
  - Summer (DST): UTC+3 (EEST)

Mantviloniai is a village in Kėdainiai district municipality, in Kaunas County, central Lithuania. It is located by the country road Aristava-Kėdainiai-Cinkiškiai. There is a meat factory located in the Mantviloniai village area. According to the 2011 census, the village has a population of 19 people.

== Demography ==
Historical population

Year	Pop.	±% p.a.
1902	145	—
1923	112	−1.22%
1959	92	−0.54%
1970	137	+3.69%

Year	Pop.	±% p.a.
1979	4	−32.47%
1989	35	+24.22%
2001	30	−1.28%
2011	19	−4.46%

Source: 1902, 1923, 1959 & 1970, 1979, 1989, 2001, 2011
