= Vištupis =

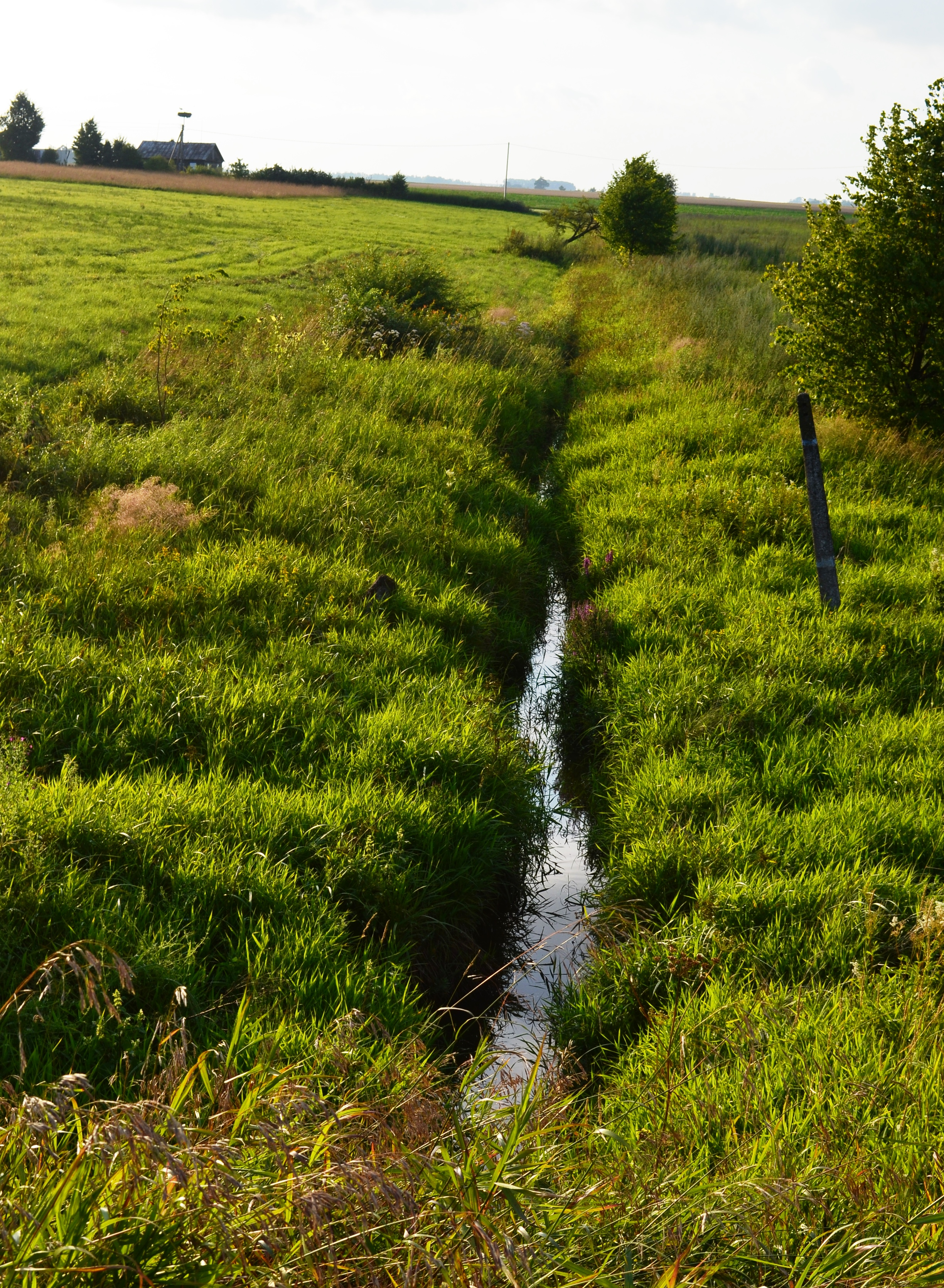
- Vištupis near Bogušiškiai village

Location
- Country: Lithuania
- Region: Kėdainiai district municipality, Kaunas County

Physical characteristics
- Source
  - location: Urnėžiai
- Mouth: Smilga
  - coordinates: 55.3071°N 23.9275°E
- Length: 6.2 km (3.9 mi)
- Basin size: 8.2 km^{2} (3.2 sq mi)

Basin features
- Progression: Smilga→ Nevėžis→ Neman→ Baltic Sea

The Vištupis is a river of Kėdainiai district municipality, Kaunas County, central Lithuania. It flows for 6.2 kilometres (3.9 mi).

The river flows into the Smilga, which is a tributary of the Nevėžis, in turn a tributary of the Neman.
