= Ruoščiai =

- Village
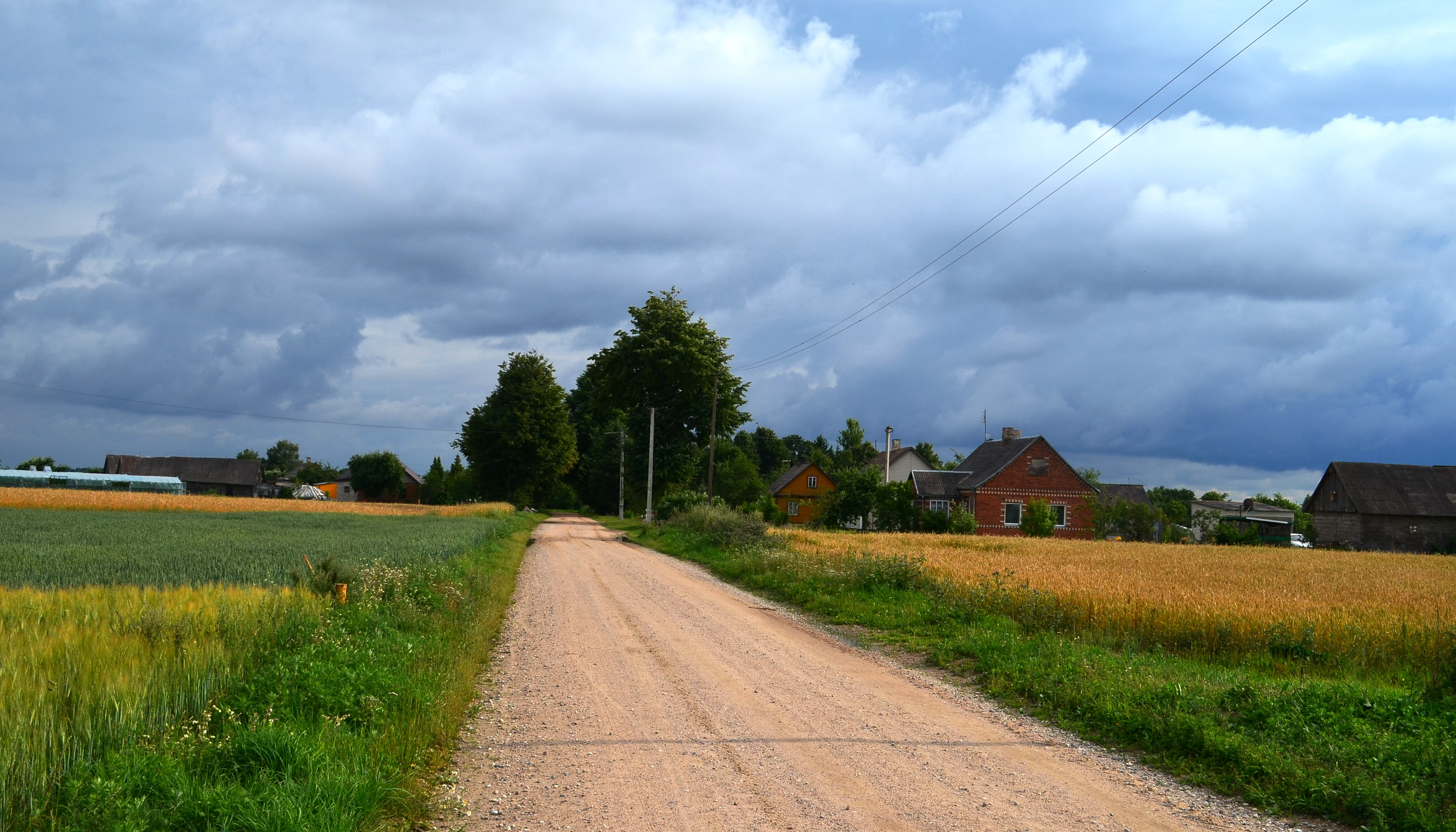

- Location of Ruoščiai Ruoščiai (Lithuania)
- Coordinates: 55°19′48″N 23°54′20″E
- Country: Lithuania
- Ethnographic region: Aukštaitija
- County: Kaunas County
- Municipality: Kėdainiai district municipality
- Eldership: Kėdainiai City Eldership

Population (2011)
  - Total: 37
- Time zone: UTC+2 (EET)
  - Summer (DST): UTC+3 (EEST)

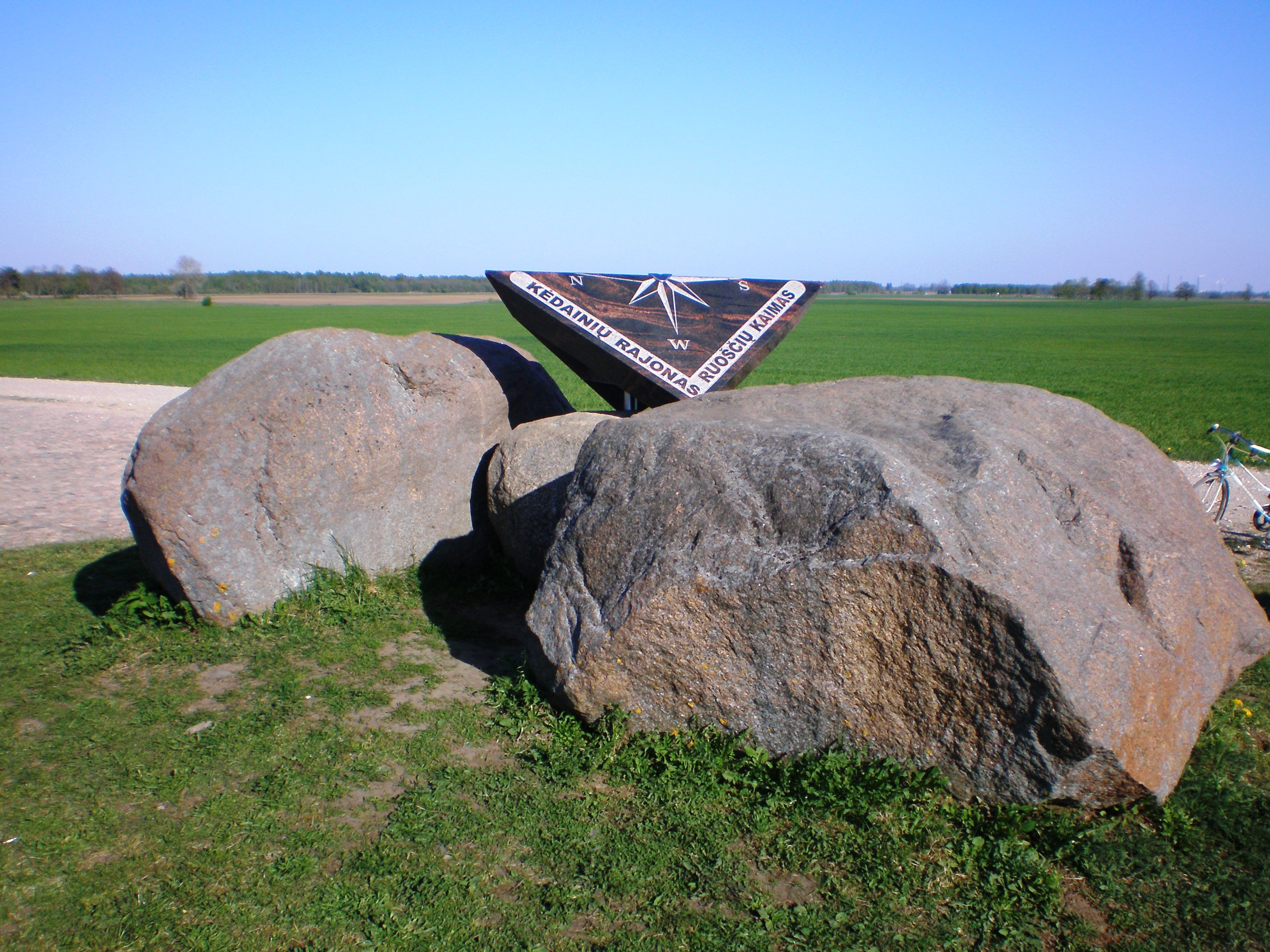
Stones marking the geographical center of Lithuania

Ruoščiai is a small village in Kėdainiai district municipality, Lithuania. Located about 3 km from the town of Dotnuva, it had 37 residents at the 2011 census. The settlement is known as the geographical center of Lithuania, which was calculated in 1995.

== Demography ==
Historical population

Year	Pop.	±% p.a.
1902	96	—
1923	71	−1.43%
1959	81	+0.37%
1970	80	−0.11%

Year	Pop.	±% p.a.
1979	54	−4.27%
1989	32	−5.10%
2001	35	+0.75%
2011	37	+0.56%

Source: 1902, 1923, 1959 & 1970, 1979, 1989, 2001, 2011
