= Ruminiai =

- Village
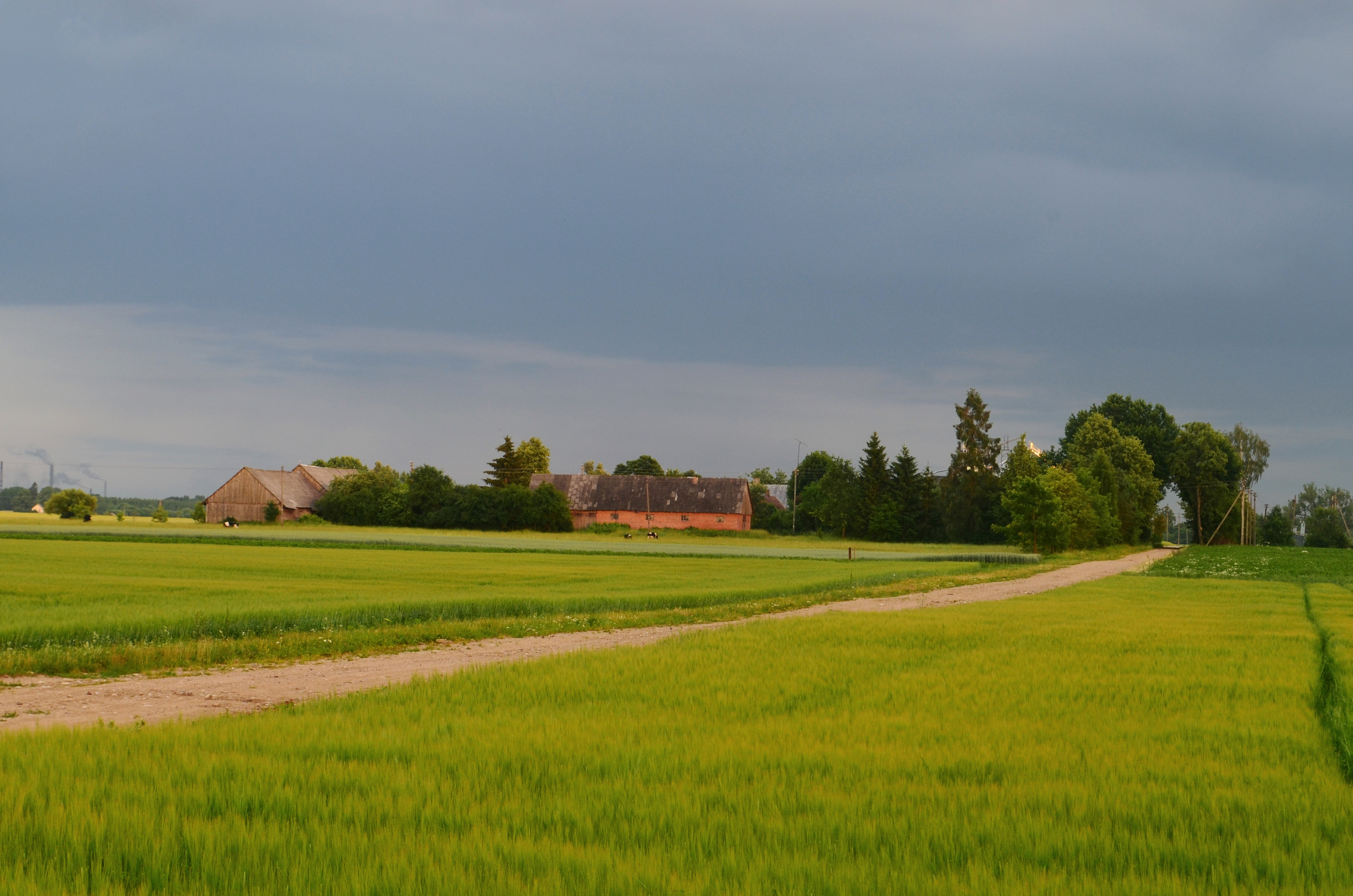

- Location in Lithuania
- Coordinates: 55°19′53″N 23°54′58″E
- Country: Lithuania
- County: Kaunas County
- Municipality: Kėdainiai district municipality
- Eldership: Kėdainiai City Eldership

Population (2011)
  - Total: 11
- Time zone: UTC+2 (EET)
  - Summer (DST): UTC+3 (EEST)

Ruminiai is a village in Kėdainiai district municipality, in Kaunas County, in central Lithuania. It is located nearby Jonava-Šeduva route and Lithuanian geographical center. According to the 2011 census, the village has a population of 11 people.

== Demography ==
Historical population

| Year | Pop. | ±% p.a. |
|---|---|---|
| 1902 | 69 | — |
| 1923 | 64 | −0.36% |
| 1959 | 47 | −0.85% |
| 1970 | 61 | +2.40% |

| Year | Pop. | ±% p.a. |
|---|---|---|
| 1979 | 52 | −1.76% |
| 1989 | 29 | −5.67% |
| 2001 | 24 | −1.56% |
| 2011 | 11 | −7.51% |

Source: 1902, 1923, 1959 & 1970, 1979, 1989, 2001, 2011
