= Kėboniai =

- Village
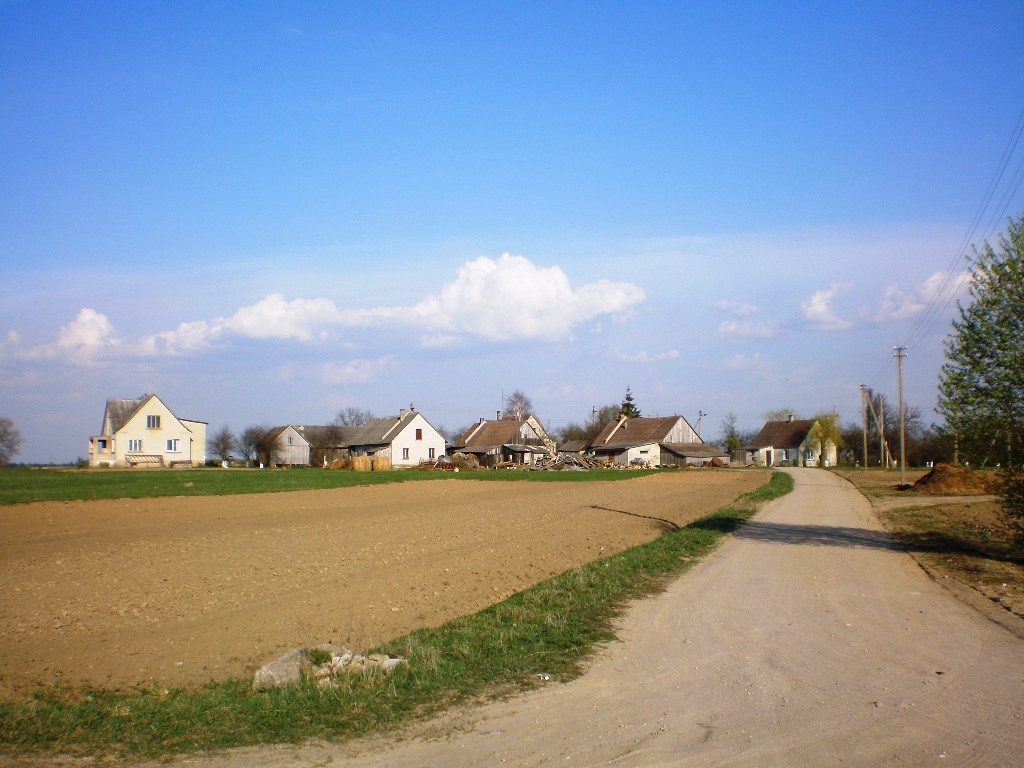

- Location in Lithuania Kėboniai (Lithuania)
- Coordinates: 55°18′30″N 23°55′10″E
- Country: Lithuania
- County: Kaunas County
- Municipality: Kėdainiai district municipality
- Eldership: Kėdainiai City Eldership

Population (2011)
  - Total: 46
- Time zone: UTC+2 (EET)
  - Summer (DST): UTC+3 (EEST)

Kėboniai (formerly Russian: Кебовиче, Polish: Kiebowicze) is a village in Kėdainiai district municipality, in Kaunas County, central Lithuania. According to the 2011 census, the village has a population of 46 people.

At the beginning of the 20th century Kėboniai was an okolica.

== Demography ==
Historical population

Year	Pop.	±% p.a.
1902	79	—
1923	109	+1.54%
1959	64	−1.47%
1970	51	−2.04%

Year	Pop.	±% p.a.
1979	43	−1.88%
1989	36	−1.76%
2001	47	+2.25%
2011	46	−0.21%

Source: 1902, 1923, 1959 & 1970, 1979, 1989, 2001, 2011
