= Dotnuva =

- Town
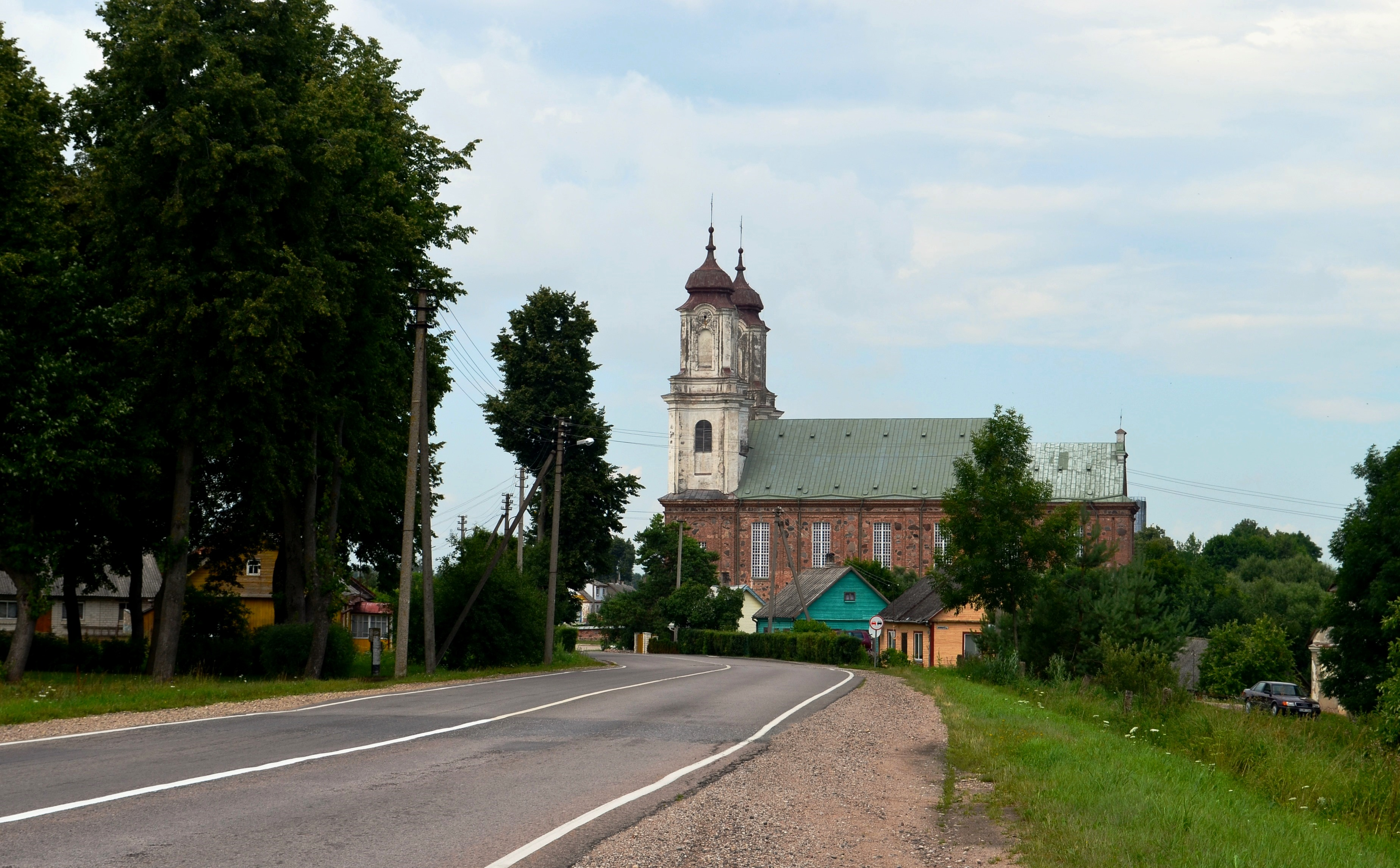
- Dotnuva church

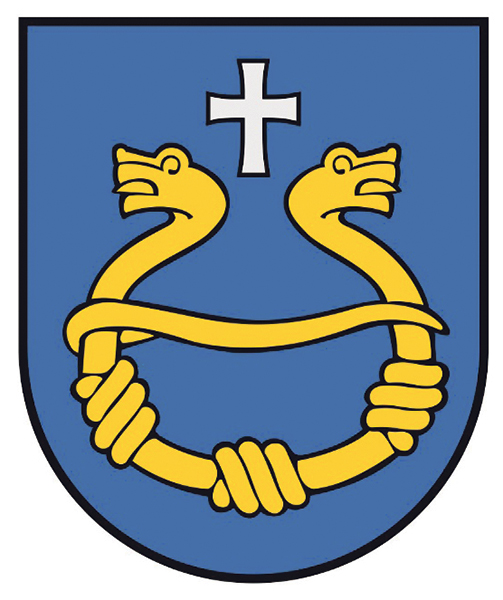
- Coat of arms

- Location of Dotnuva Dotnuva (Lithuania)
- Coordinates: 55°21′0″N 23°54′0″E
- Country: Lithuania
- Ethnographic region: Samogitia
- County: Kaunas County
- Municipality: Kėdainiai district municipality
- Eldership: Dotnuva Eldership
- Capital of: Dotnuva eldership
- First mentioned: 1372

Population (2021)
  - Total: 643
- Time zone: UTC+2 (EET)
  - Summer (DST): UTC+3 (EEST)

Dotnuva is a small town with a 2003 population of 775 in central Lithuania, 10 km northwest of Kėdainiai, in the Kėdainiai district municipality. It is located on the Dotnuvėlė River. The geographical center of Lithuania, in the village of Ruoščiai, is only a few kilometres away. There is a Catholic church, a former Bernardine monastery, a former sawmill and a watermill in Dotnuva. The Dotnuva manor is in the nearby town of Akademija.

Dotnuva is an important centre of agriculture.

== Etymology ==
Although the form Datinen is mentioned in Latin texts from 1372, the later dominant form was Dotnava (used until 1925). Previously, the river Dotnuvėlė flowing near the town was also called Dotnava, so it is believed that the name of the town originated from the name of the river and is of hydronymic origin. In other languages town's name is translated as: Polish: Datnów, Russian: Датнов, German: Dotnau.

== History ==
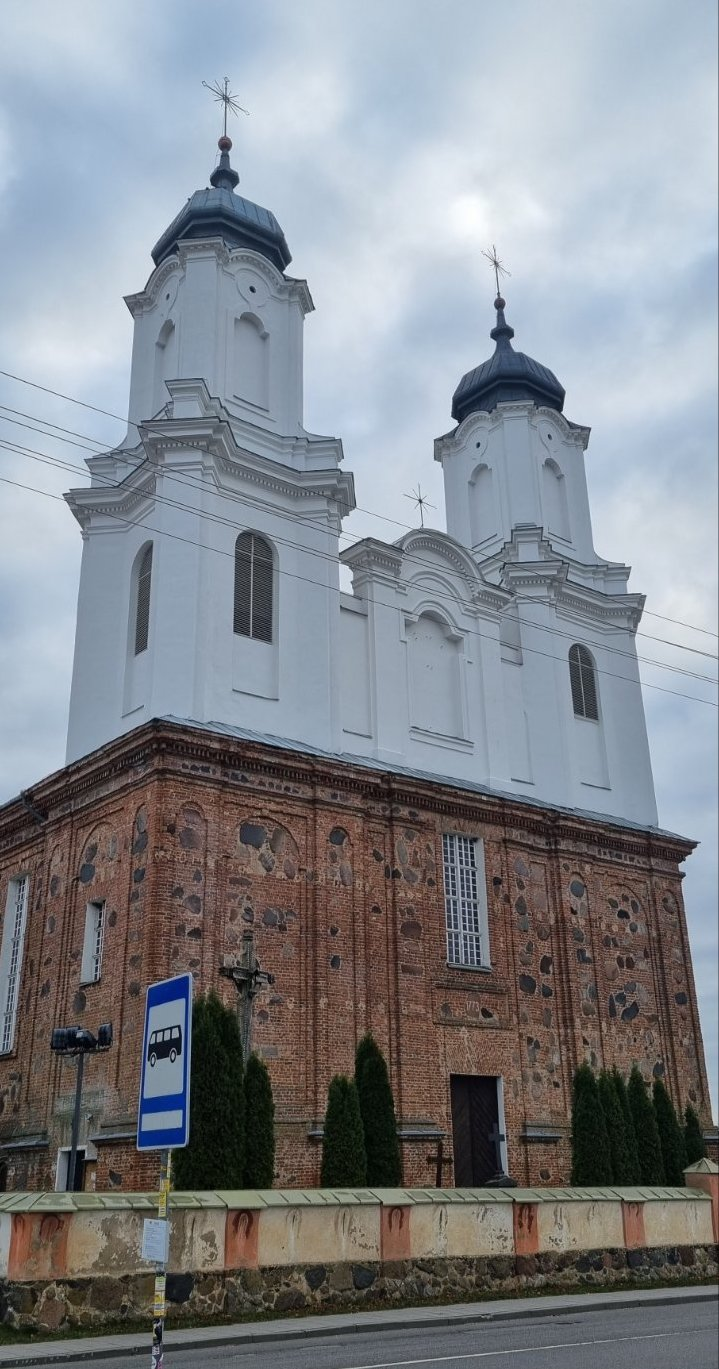
Church of Dotnuva

The first mention of the name Dotnuva was in 1372. The Dotnuva estate was known from the 16th century. In 1636, the first wooden church was built. The Polish-Lithuanian Brzostowski family, the owners of surrounding land and town, invited Bernardines from Vilnius and in 1701, a Bernardine monastery was established in the town. The monastery was begun in 1768 and the church in 1773–1810. This monastery also kept the primary school similar to the other Bernardine monasteries. The school was opened in 1796 and in beginning of the 19th century grew to the level of high school (gymnasium). But as the monks got involved in the 1831 Uprising against Russian rule, the school was closed in 1836.

The town has a long history of farming education. In 1911–1914 Pyotr Stolypin founded the farming school in the old estate. A new building for this school was built (destroyed in 1944). In 1924, Dotnuva Agricultural College was founded at the Dotnuva estate, today called Akademija. During the Soviet occupation on 26 February 1947, the first kolkhoz in Lithuania – the Marytės Melnikaitės kolūkis – was established nearby.

From 1956 to 1996, Dotnuva held the status of a city, but later was declared a town.

== Climate ==
Climate data for Dotnuva (1991–2020 normals)
Month	Jan	Feb	Mar	Apr	May	Jun	Jul	Aug	Sep	Oct	Nov	Dec	Year
Mean daily maximum °C (°F)	−0.9 (30.4)	0.0 (32.0)	4.7 (40.5)	12.5 (54.5)	18.4 (65.1)	21.5 (70.7)	23.9 (75.0)	23.3 (73.9)	17.7 (63.9)	10.6 (51.1)	4.5 (40.1)	0.7 (33.3)	11.4 (52.5)
Daily mean °C (°F)	−3.0 (26.6)	−2.6 (27.3)	1.0 (33.8)	7.5 (45.5)	12.9 (55.2)	16.3 (61.3)	18.6 (65.5)	17.8 (64.0)	12.9 (55.2)	7.2 (45.0)	2.5 (36.5)	−1.2 (29.8)	7.5 (45.5)
Mean daily minimum °C (°F)	−5.3 (22.5)	−5.2 (22.6)	−2.1 (28.2)	2.8 (37.0)	7.6 (45.7)	11.2 (52.2)	13.6 (56.5)	12.9 (55.2)	8.9 (48.0)	4.3 (39.7)	0.6 (33.1)	−3.3 (26.1)	3.8 (38.9)
Average precipitation mm (inches)	38 (1.5)	32 (1.3)	31 (1.2)	31 (1.2)	46 (1.8)	59 (2.3)	80 (3.1)	66 (2.6)	45 (1.8)	52 (2.0)	43 (1.7)	43 (1.7)	566 (22.2)
Average relative humidity (%)	86	83	77	69	67	71	73	74	79	84	88	88	78
Source: Lithuanian Hydrometeorological Service

== Demography ==
Historical population

Year	Pop.	±% p.a.
1833	432	—
1865	494	+0.42%
1897	616	+0.69%

Year	Pop.	±% p.a.
1923	491	−0.87%
1959	1,135	+2.35%
1970	1,008	−1.07%

Year	Pop.	±% p.a.
1974	1,200	+4.46%
1976	1,200	+0.00%
1979	990	−6.21%

Year	Pop.	±% p.a.
1989	867	−1.32%
2001	775	−0.93%
2011	687	−1.20%

Source: 1902, 1923, 1959 & 1970, 1979, 1989, 2001, 2011
