= Kėdainiai Airport =

Kėdainiai Airport Kėdainių aerodromas
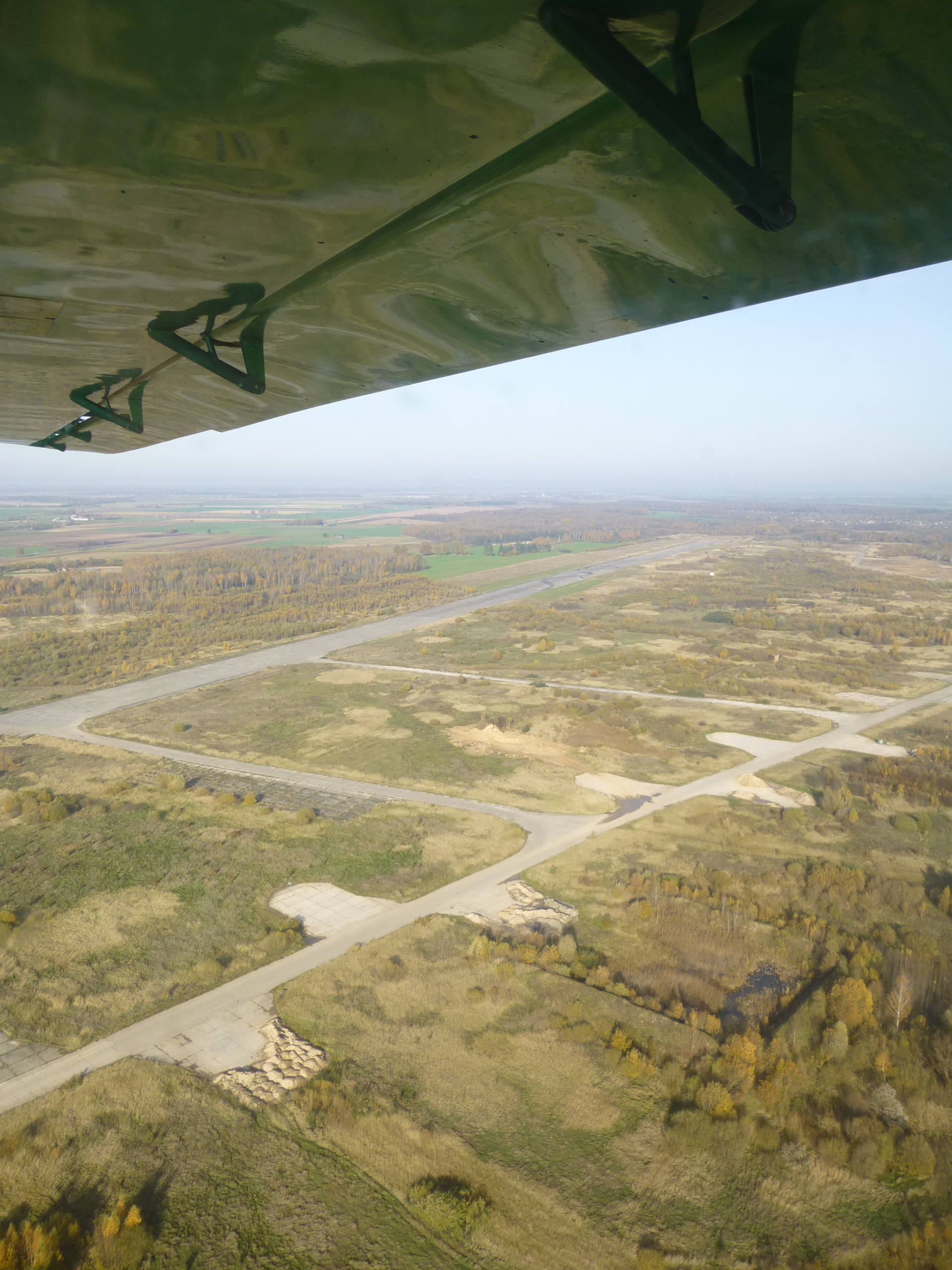
- IATA: none; ICAO: EYKD

Summary
- Airport type: Public
- Owner: Lithuanian government
- Location: Daukšiai, Kėdainiai (Kaunas County)
- Elevation AMSL: 171 ft / 52 m
- Coordinates: 55°18′42″N 023°57′12″E
- Interactive map of Kėdainiai Airport

Runways
Direction	Length		Surface
Direction	ft	m	Surface
16/34	6,562	2,000	Asphalt

Kedainiai (ICAO: EYKD) is an airport in Lithuania located 45 km north of Kaunas in Daukšiai. It has 28 large pads. Aeronautical sources list it as "civilian", its military use has been long retired. There is a large hangar as well, that houses a variety of privately owned light aircraft. The civilian aircraft usually operate from the taxiways, as they are more than adequate for light aircraft. It also often hosts auto racing on the main runways, both drag racing and drift courses.

The airport was built in the period of USSR control during World War II.

It was the base for 600 VTAP (600th Military Transport Aviation Regiment) flying Il-76 and An-12 from September 1958, until 1992 when the unit was relocated to Shadrinsk, Kurgan Oblast. While in Lithuania the regiment was under command of the 3rd Guards, 12th and 18th (4.66 - 1998) Military Transport Aviation Divisions. During the 1980s, under glasnost, the Soviet government admitted the crimes of the Stalinist era and allowed the long overdue repatriation of the remains of Lithuanian victims to return from Siberia. The Soviet government did not want the arrivals of the repatriation flights to become public spectacles, further inflaming the rising nationalist sentiments, so the remains were flown into Kedainai and then transported to Vilnius and Kaunas.

== Former uses ==
- (Soviet Union) Soviet Air Forces
