= Daukšiai, Kėdainiai =

Daukšiai
- Village
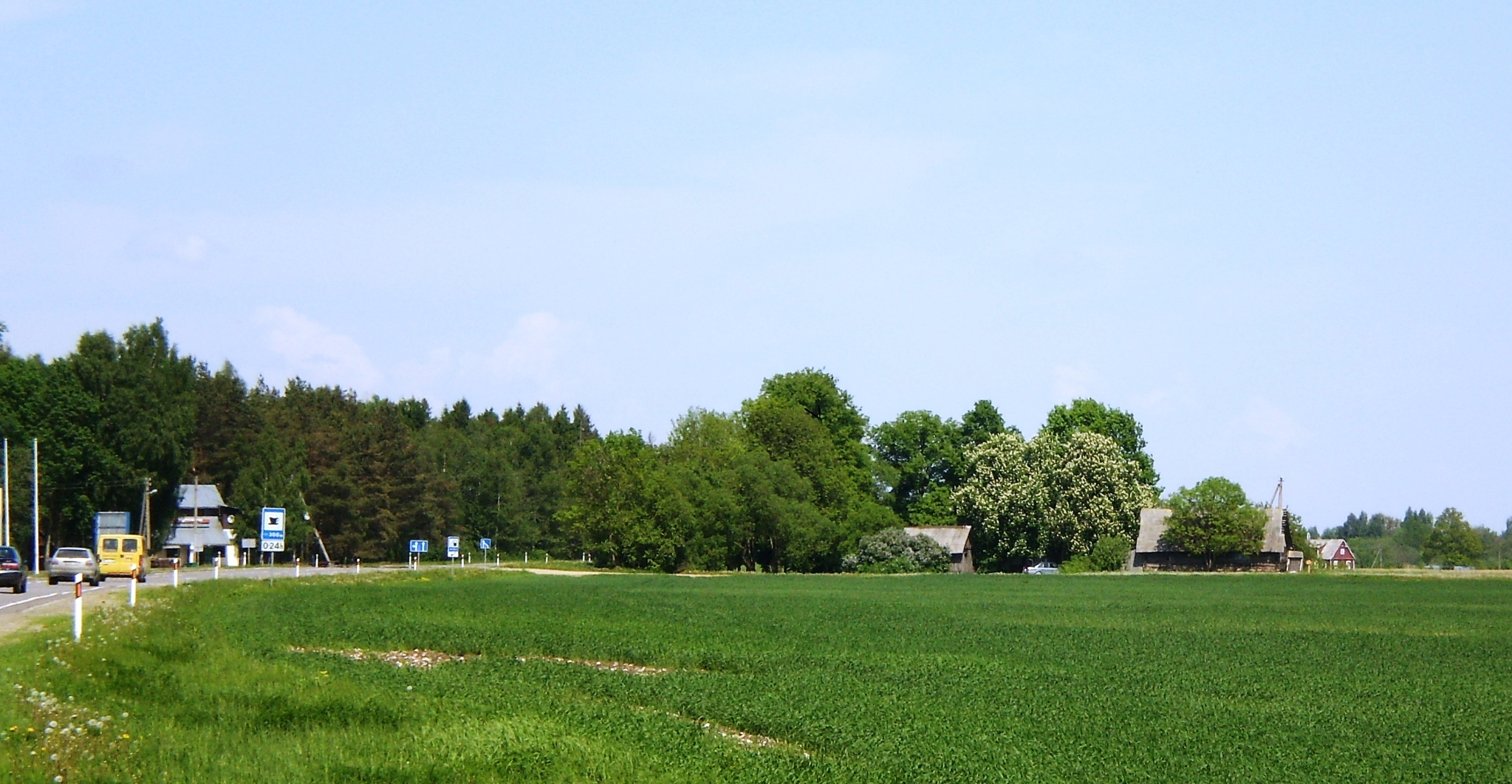

- Location in Lithuania
- Coordinates: 55°20′20″N 23°56′20″E
- Country: Lithuania
- County: Kaunas County
- Municipality: Kėdainiai district municipality
- Eldership: Kėdainiai City Eldership

Population (2011)
  - Total: 7
- Time zone: UTC+2 (EET)
  - Summer (DST): UTC+3 (EEST)

Daukšiai is a village in Kėdainiai district municipality, in Kaunas County, central Lithuania. According to the 2011 census, the village has a population of 7 people. The Kėdainiai Air Base is located in the village.

== Demography ==
Historical population

| Year | Pop. | ±% p.a. |
|---|---|---|
| 1902 | 112 | — |
| 1923 | 107 | −0.22% |
| 1959 | 43 | −2.50% |
| 1970 | 29 | −3.52% |

| Year | Pop. | ±% p.a. |
|---|---|---|
| 1979 | 13 | −8.53% |
| 1989 | 8 | −4.74% |
| 2001 | 8 | +0.00% |
| 2011 | 7 | −1.33% |

Source: 1902, 1923, 1959 & 1970, 1979, 1989, 2001, 2011
