= Kecskemét =

City with county rights in Southern Great Plain, Hungary

- City with county rights
- Kecskemét Megyei Jogú Város
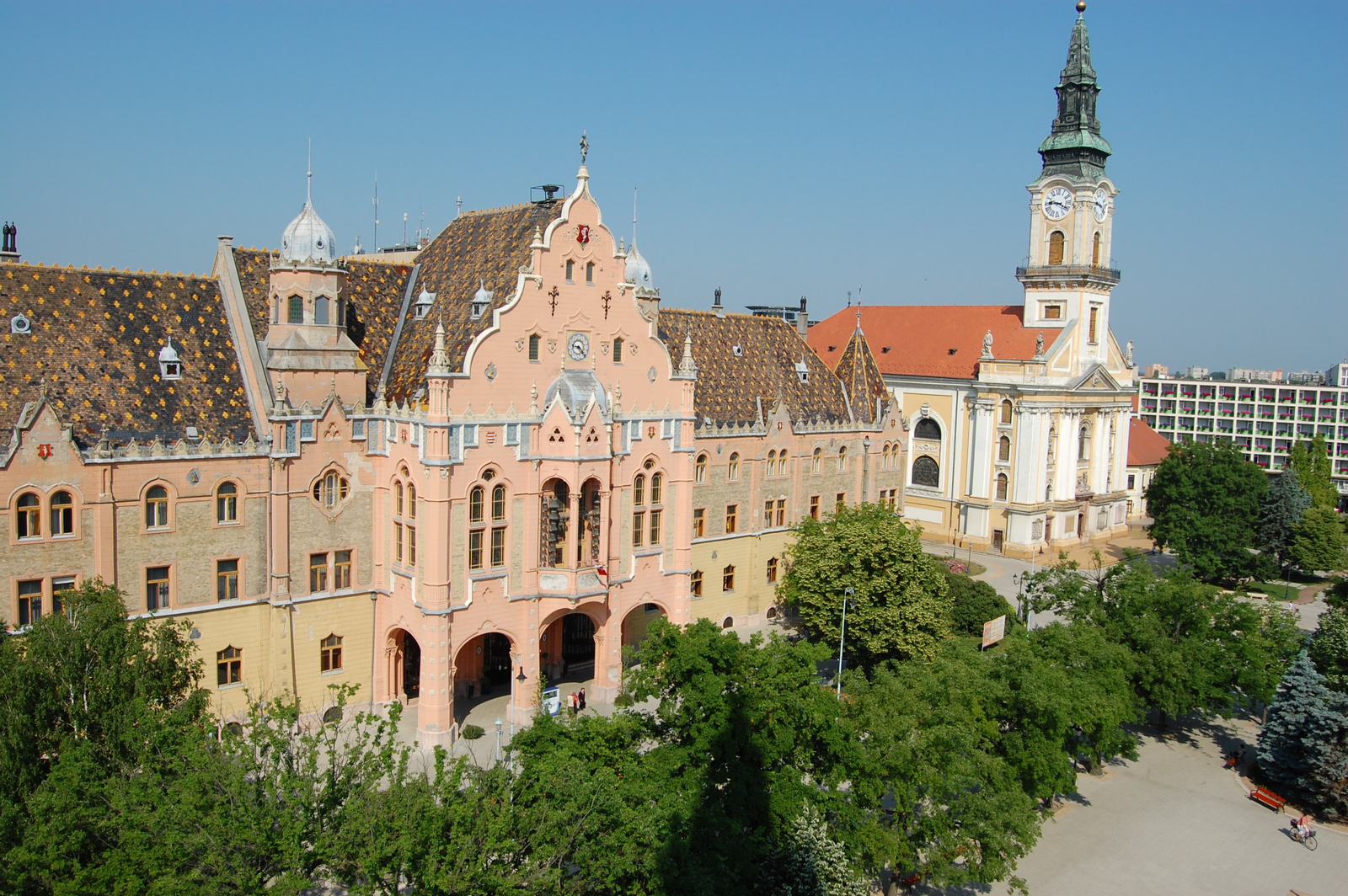
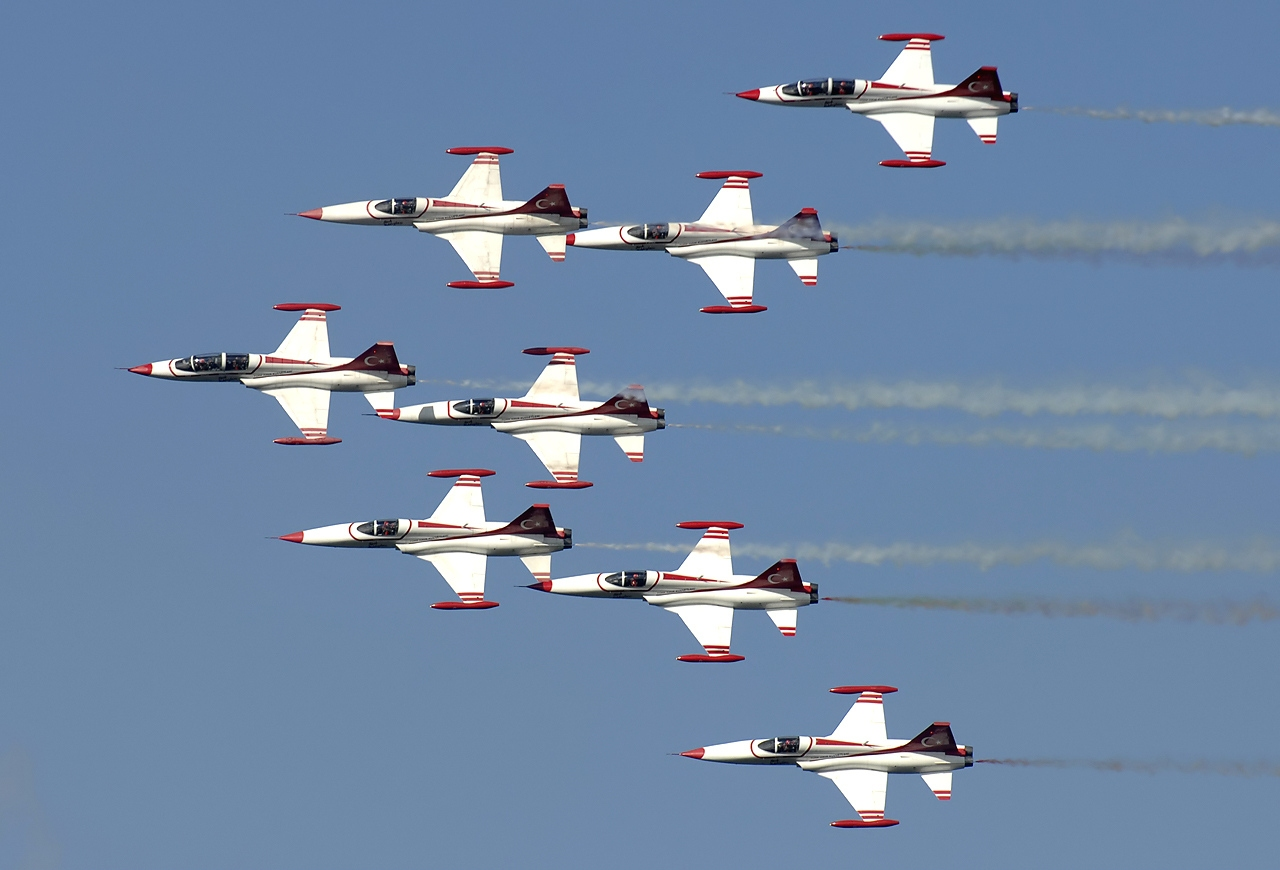
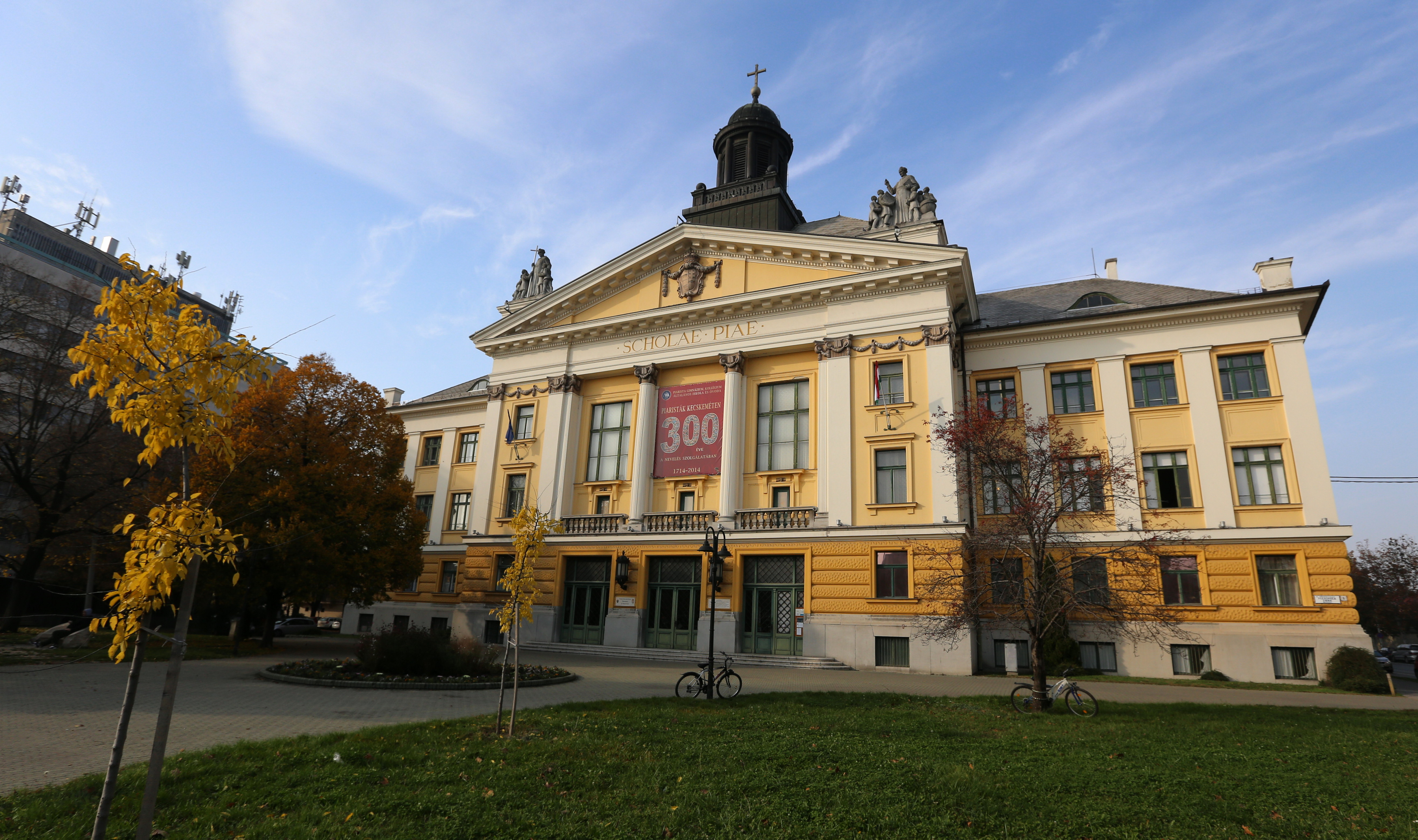
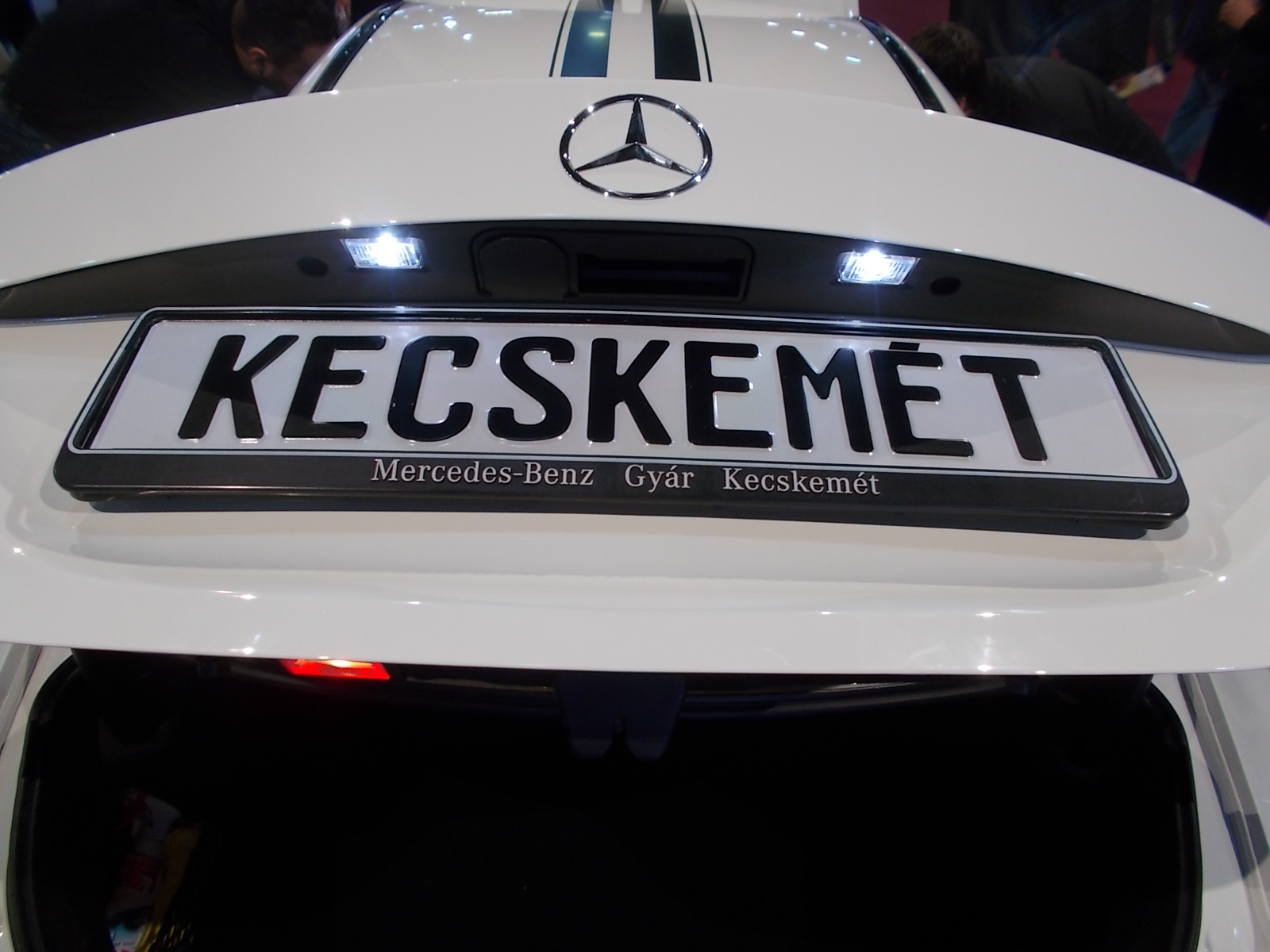
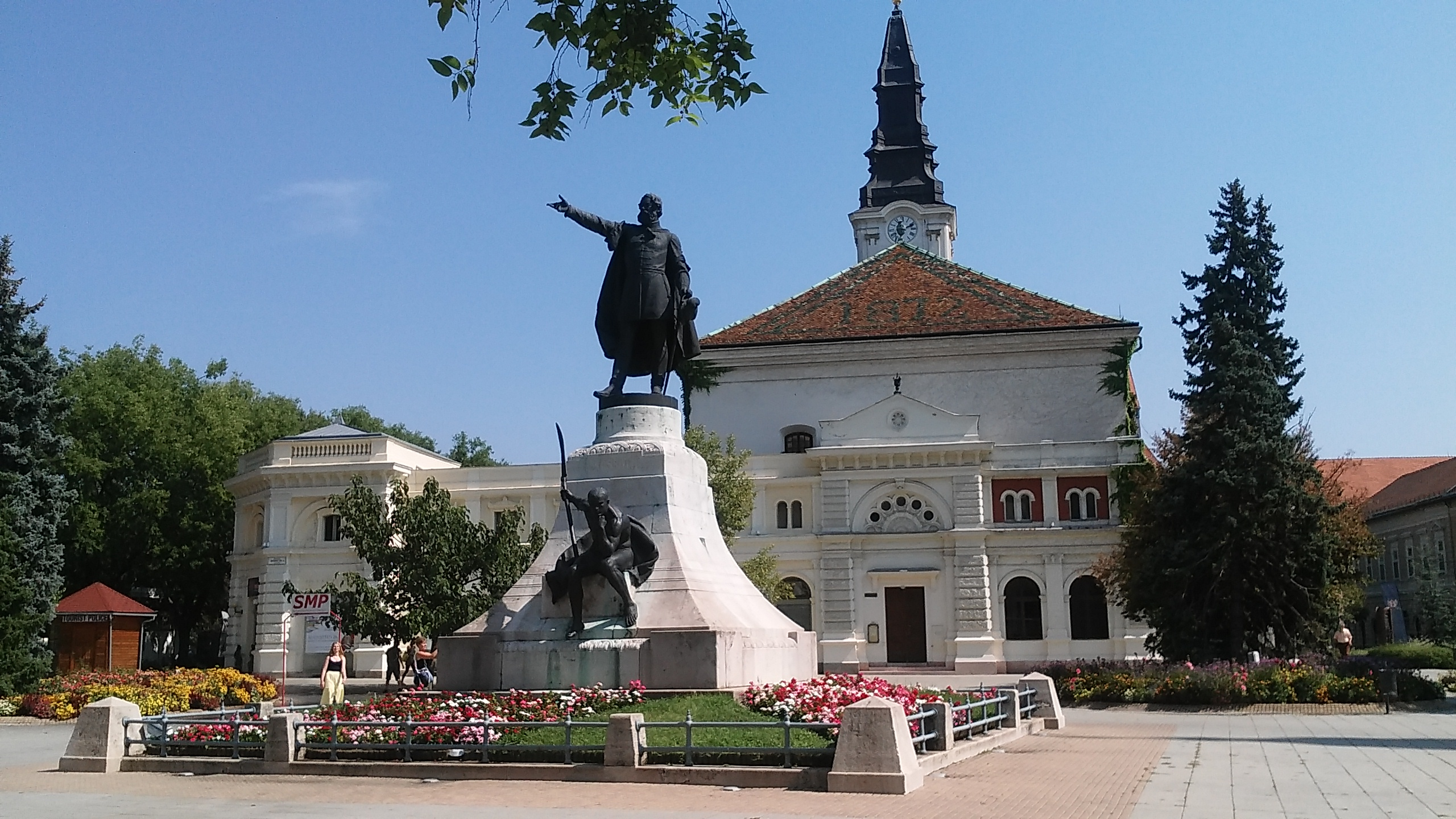
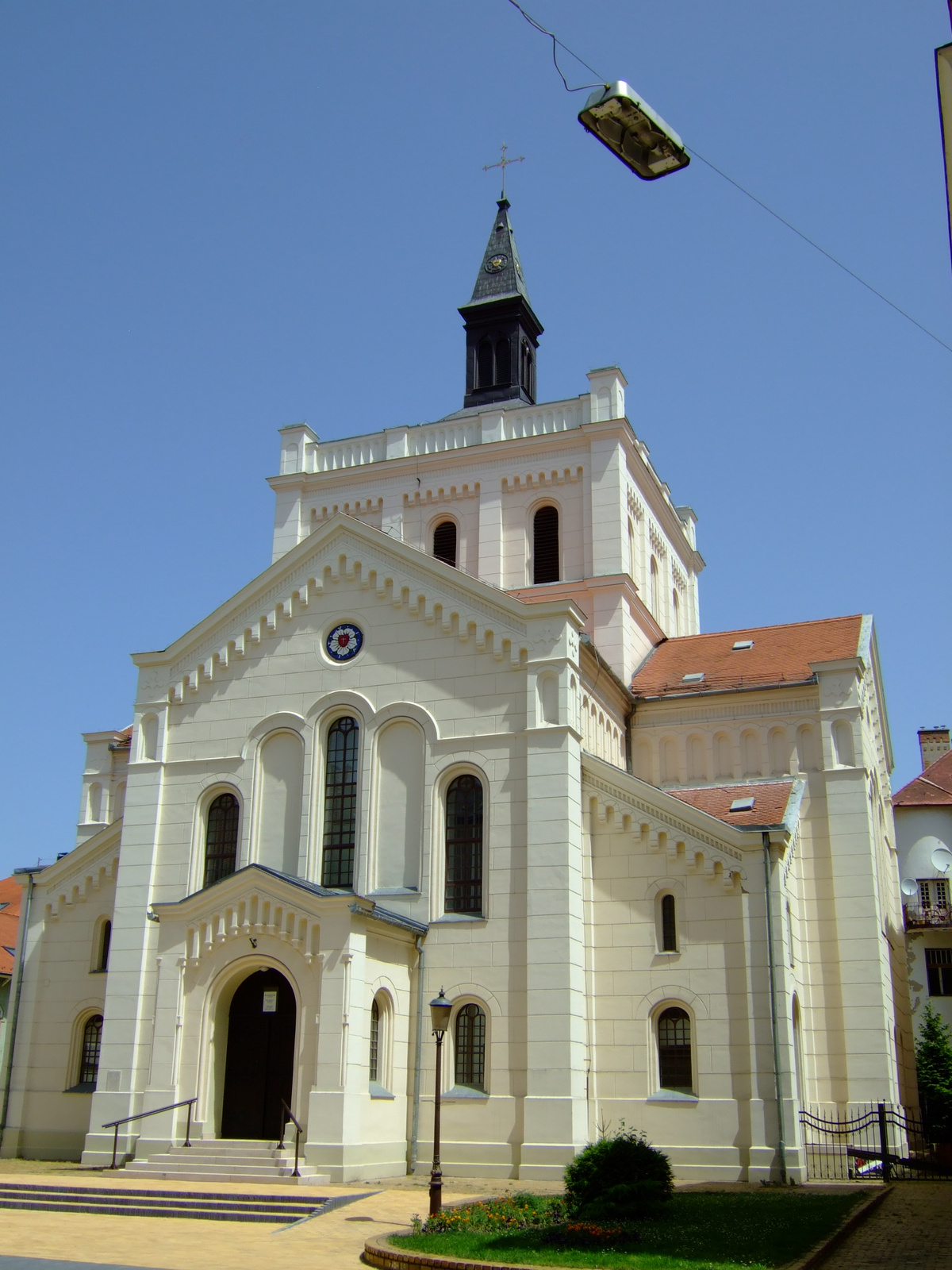
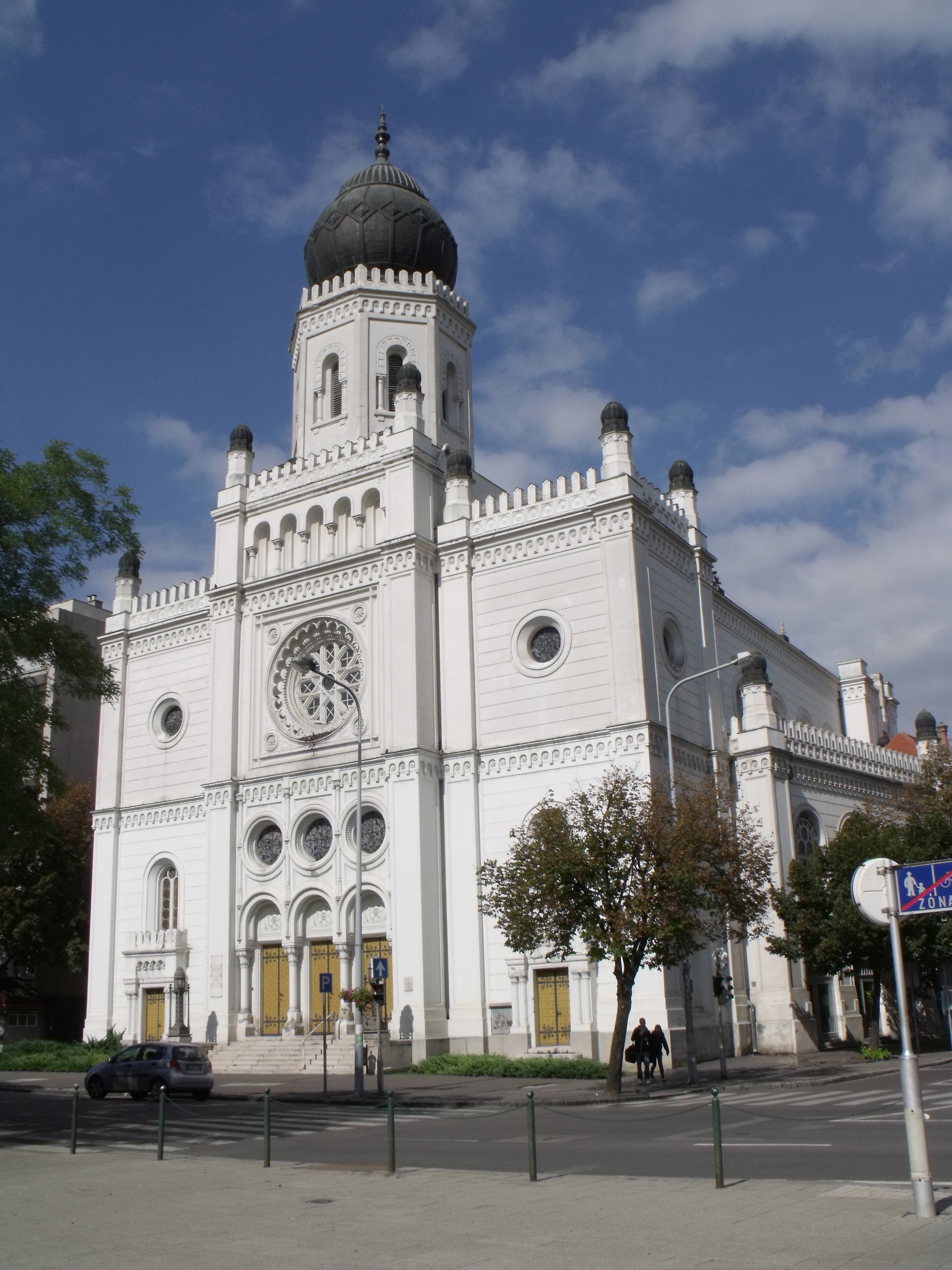

- Flag Coat of arms

- Location within Bács-Kiskun County Location within Hungary Location within Europe
- Coordinates: 46°54′27″N 19°41′30″E
- Country: Hungary
- Region: Southern Great Plain
- County: Bács-Kiskun
- District: Kecskemét
- Established: 9th century AD
- Market town: 14th century AD

Government
  - Mayor: Klaudia Szemerey-Pataki (Fidesz-KDNP)
  - Deputy Mayor: Gyula Tamás Szeberényi (Fidesz-KDNP); Kornél Mák (Fidesz-KDNP); József Gaál (Independent); Tamás Homoki (Independent)
  - Town Notary: Mária Berenténé Meskó

Area
  - City with county rights: 321.36 km^{2} (124.08 sq mi)
- Elevation: 105 m (344 ft)

Population (1 January 2016)
  - City with county rights: 110,813
  - Rank: 8th in Hungary
  - Urban: 187,835 (8th)
- Demonym: kecskeméti

Population by ethnicity
  - Hungarians: 84.8%
  - Germans: 1.3%
  - Gypsies: 1.1%
  - Romanians: 0.3%
  - Serbs: 0.1%
  - Slovaks: 0.1%
  - Croats: 0.1%
  - Bulgarians: 0.1%
  - Ukrainians: 0.1%
  - Others: 1.1%

Population by religion
  - Roman Catholic: 39.7%
  - Greek Catholic: 0.3%
  - Calvinists: 10.2%
  - Lutherans: 1.2%
  - Jews: 0.1%
  - Other: 1.6%
  - Non-religious: 17.3%
  - Unknown: 29.6%
- Time zone: UTC+1 (CET)
  - Summer (DST): UTC+2 (CEST)
- Postal code: 6000 to 6008, 6044
- Area code: (+36) 76
- Motorways: M5, M8 (planned), M44 (planned)
- NUTS 3 code: HU331
- Distance from Budapest: 91.5 km (56.9 mi) Northeast
- International airports: Kecskemét
- MP: László Salacz (Fidesz); Gábor Zombor (Fidesz)
- Website: kecskemet.hu

Kecskemét (US: /ˈkɛtʃkɛmeɪt/ KETCH-kem-ayt Hungarian: [ˈkɛt͡ʃkɛmeːt]) is a city with county rights in central Hungary. It is the eighth-largest city in the country, and the county seat of Bács-Kiskun.

Kecskemét lies halfway between the capital Budapest and the country's third-largest city, Szeged, 86 kilometres (53 miles) from both of them and almost equal distance from the two big rivers of the country, the Danube and the Tisza. It is the northern of two centres of the Hungarian Southern Great Plain (Hungarian: Dél-Alföld) region (with Bács-Kiskun, Békés and Csongrád counties). The southern centre is Szeged, the seat of Csongrád County.

== Etymology ==
The name of the city stems from the Hungarian word kecske, meaning 'goat', and -mét, meaning 'pass'.

== Geography ==
Kecskemét was established at the meeting point of a large sandy region and a sandy yellow soil. Its elevation is 120 m (394 ft) above sea level. The territory west of the city is covered by wind-blown sand and is characterised by the almost parallel northern-southern sand dunes and the plain between them. In the late 18th and the early 19th centuries, the pastures become depleted. Overgrazing by cattle had destroyed natural vegetation cover, and the movement of sand seriously endangered the town. The concentrated reforestation and planting of fruit and vines were carried out to restabilise the soil.

Kecskemét is in the centre of Kiskunság, one of Hungary's famous regions. The Kiskunság National Park was established in 1975 to preserve the many different regional species of plants and animals. It is a 'mosaic'-type national park and has units that are not connected.

=== Climate ===
The weather in the Kecskemét region of Kiskunság is characteristically continental warm and dry and is sometimes extreme. The amount of sunlight makes allows the region to produce agricultural products such as wheat, apricots, red peppers, and tomatoes. The warmest month in Kecskemét is July, with an average temperature of 22.2 °C (72.0 °F); the coldest is January, at −0.3 °C (31.5 °F).

Early spring and late autumn frosts are frequent on the Great Hungarian Plain. The possibility of frost usually ends only in mid-April. After the third week of October, the temperature is frequently below 0 °C (32 °F).

Climate data for Kecskemét, 1991−2020 normals
Month	Jan	Feb	Mar	Apr	May	Jun	Jul	Aug	Sep	Oct	Nov	Dec	Year
Record high °C (°F)	19.0 (66.2)	20.5 (68.9)	26.2 (79.2)	30.6 (87.1)	34.3 (93.7)	37.7 (99.9)	41.1 (106.0)	38.1 (100.6)	35.6 (96.1)	28.3 (82.9)	22.6 (72.7)	18.5 (65.3)	41.1 (106.0)
Mean daily maximum °C (°F)	3.3 (37.9)	6.1 (43.0)	11.8 (53.2)	18.1 (64.6)	22.8 (73.0)	26.2 (79.2)	28.4 (83.1)	28.6 (83.5)	22.8 (73.0)	16.9 (62.4)	9.9 (49.8)	3.9 (39.0)	16.6 (61.9)
Daily mean °C (°F)	−0.3 (31.5)	1.5 (34.7)	6.2 (43.2)	11.8 (53.2)	16.5 (61.7)	20.4 (68.7)	22.2 (72.0)	21.7 (71.1)	16.4 (61.5)	11.1 (52.0)	5.6 (42.1)	0.7 (33.3)	11.2 (52.2)
Mean daily minimum °C (°F)	−3.3 (26.1)	−2.5 (27.5)	1.3 (34.3)	6.2 (43.2)	10.6 (51.1)	14.3 (57.7)	15.7 (60.3)	15.4 (59.7)	11.0 (51.8)	6.3 (43.3)	2.0 (35.6)	−2.1 (28.2)	6.2 (43.2)
Record low °C (°F)	−23.7 (−10.7)	−21.1 (−6.0)	−14.9 (5.2)	−5.1 (22.8)	−0.3 (31.5)	4.4 (39.9)	6.8 (44.2)	7.1 (44.8)	0.7 (33.3)	−8.0 (17.6)	−12.2 (10.0)	−21.7 (−7.1)	−23.7 (−10.7)
Average precipitation mm (inches)	28.7 (1.13)	33.2 (1.31)	26.1 (1.03)	34.3 (1.35)	60.4 (2.38)	71.8 (2.83)	62.4 (2.46)	45.5 (1.79)	50.4 (1.98)	43.7 (1.72)	42.5 (1.67)	40.8 (1.61)	539.8 (21.25)
Average precipitation days (≥ 1.0 mm)	5.6	5.9	5.5	6.4	8.8	8.1	6.8	5.7	6.1	6.5	6.7	7.5	79.6
Average snowy days	8.25	6.54	3.42	0.63	0	0	0	0	0	0.17	1.96	5.38	26.35
Average relative humidity (%)	83.0	77.0	67.3	60.6	64.1	65.1	62.9	63.6	69.1	77.2	83.9	84.7	71.5
Source: NOAA, Meteomanz(snowy days 2000-2023, extremes since 2021)

== History ==
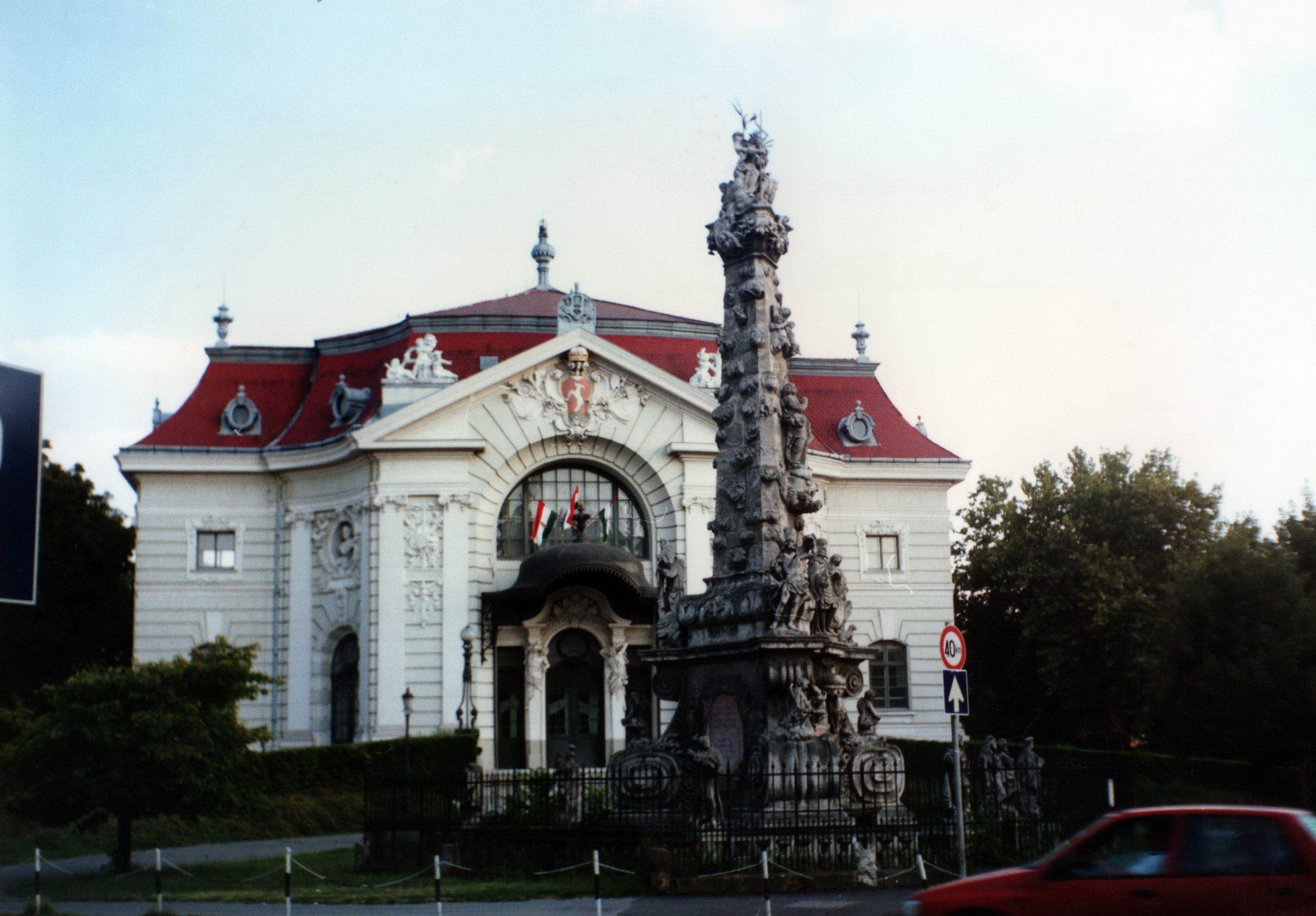
József Katona Theatre

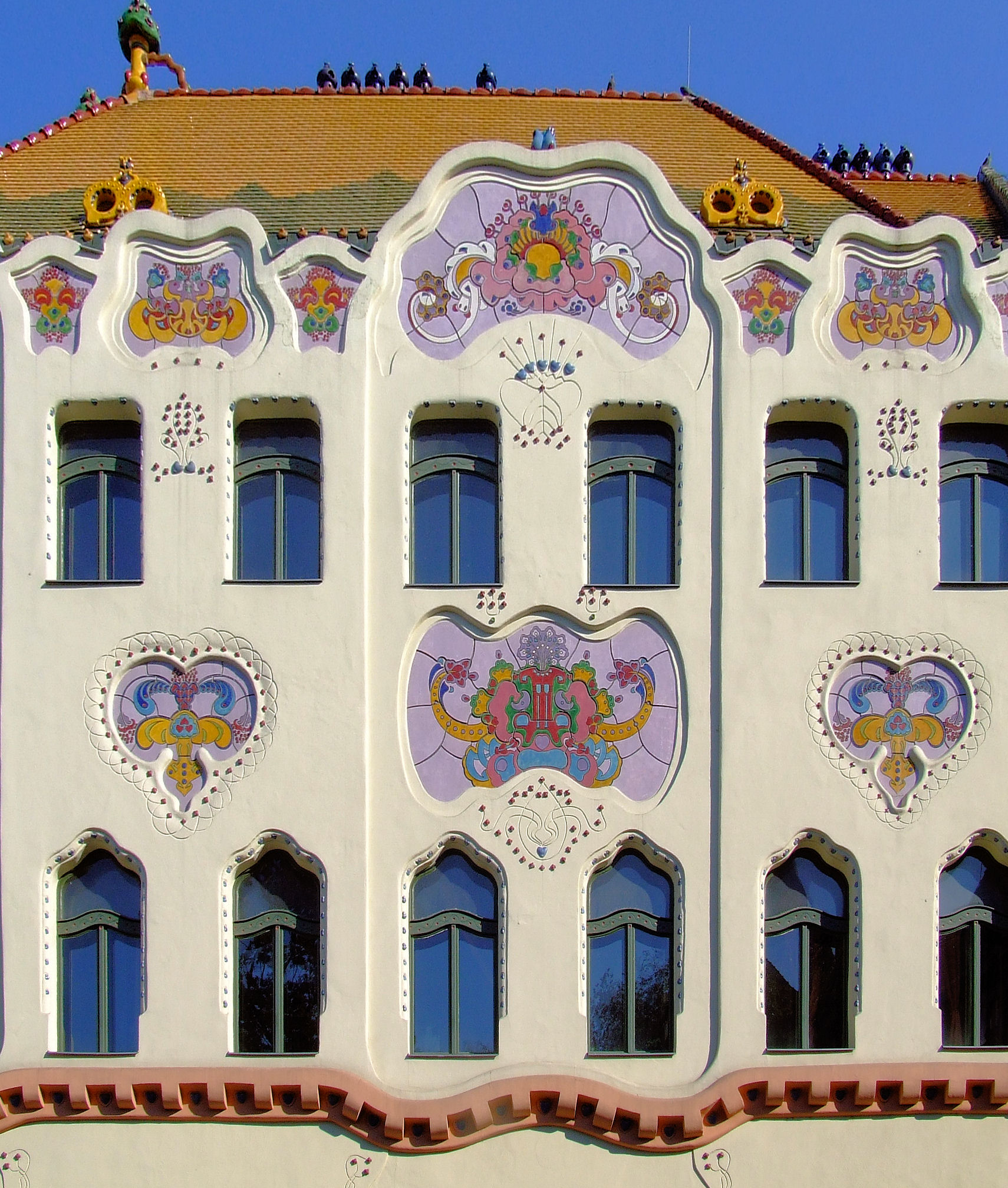
Hungarian Art Nouveau: Cifrapalota

The first archaeological trace of a human in the area is about 5,000 years old. The Sarmatians invaded the area in the 1st Anno century BC; since then, the area has been continuously inhabited by a variety of cultures. János Hornyik, the first town historian, believed that the settlement known as Partiskum of the Sarmatian Jazygian was here. The consensus among historians is now that it is more likely that permanent settlement occurred only after the Hungarian conquest. In the early 13th century, there were seven villages in the area, each with a population of 200–300, which were formed near the village church, a typical rural pattern. They were all destroyed by the First Mongol invasion. Some of the villages revived at the time of colonisation by the Cumans.

As Kecskemét was at an important trading route, it grew as a customs-house and market-place; in 1368, it was identified in one of King Louis I of Hungary's charters as an oppidium (town). The town's active economic life and relatively dense population attracted more traders, craftsmen and residents, including Jews, who became an important part of the town.

During the Ottoman conquest, settlers from neighbouring villages sought shelter in Kecskemét, which was protected by defensive palisades. They also were escaping the oppression of the spahi landlords. In addition to the protection of its setting, the town of Kecskemét had arranged to pay tax directly to the pasha in Buda, thus gaining his protection and enjoying a special situation.

Kecskemét gradually absorbed the lands of those who had taken refuge in the town. Residents created a large common field for the animals that they bred. By the early 18th century, residents held nearly 30,000 cattle, which grazed on an almost 2,000-square-kilometre (770 sq mi) field.

In the late 18th century, animal breeding started to decline in economic importance, as the fields had become overgrazed and denuded. It took nearly 100 years before the region developed its next major agricultural commodity. In the 19th century, Kecskemét was already part of an important wine district, but the city increased in importance after the vine-pest destroyed most vineyards in the hilly regions. The damage was less significant in the plains, areas of loose, sandy soil. In the 1870s, landowners planted large plantations of grapevines around the town, which were the basis of the 20th-century vineyards and wine industry of the 20th century in Kecskemét. Cottage-type settlements grew up at the vineyards to house workers, a pattern still characteristic of the rural areas around the town. The growth of the wine industry stimulated those of the food industry and trade. The city is still known for its barackpálinka, an apricot brandy.

With their accumulation of capital, peasants began to adopt bourgeois customs and goods, stimulating trade in the town. Such regional wealth led to construction of new buildings, especially those surrounding Kecskemét's main square. The Art Nouveau complex is architecturally significant and had the Town Hall, the New College, the Ornamented Palace, the Luther-Palace, the House of Trade (today the House of Young), and the Gentlemen's Casino (today the Hungarian Museum of Photography).

The town's growth suffered in the 1929–1933 economic world crisis and Great Depression, followed by the upheaval and the destruction of the Second World War. During the war and especially May–June 1944, Hungarian authorities rounded up and deported most of the Jews, who had been an important part of Kecskemét's thriving culture and trade, from the city to Auschwitz-Birkenau, where most of thenm were killed. After 1945, the new communist government, which was strongly influenced by the Soviet Union, imposed a different social-political system. Kecskemét's development slowed. The reorganisation in local government made Kecskemét lose much of its territory. Several new independent villages were formed in the area and were economically connected to the city .

In 1950, for the first time, Kecskemét took on a significant political administrative role, as it was made seat of, Bács-Kiskun County, the country's largest. In the special system of the so-called controlled economy under the communist regime, the status provided political and financial advantages, which greatly helped the city continue its growth. The architect József Kerényi (1900–1975) adapted and renovated several historic buildings for other uses and helped keep the varied historical character of the city alive. For instance, in the early 1970s, he renovated the early-18th-century Franciscan monastery for use as the Zoltán Kodály Conservatory, which opened for classes in 1975.

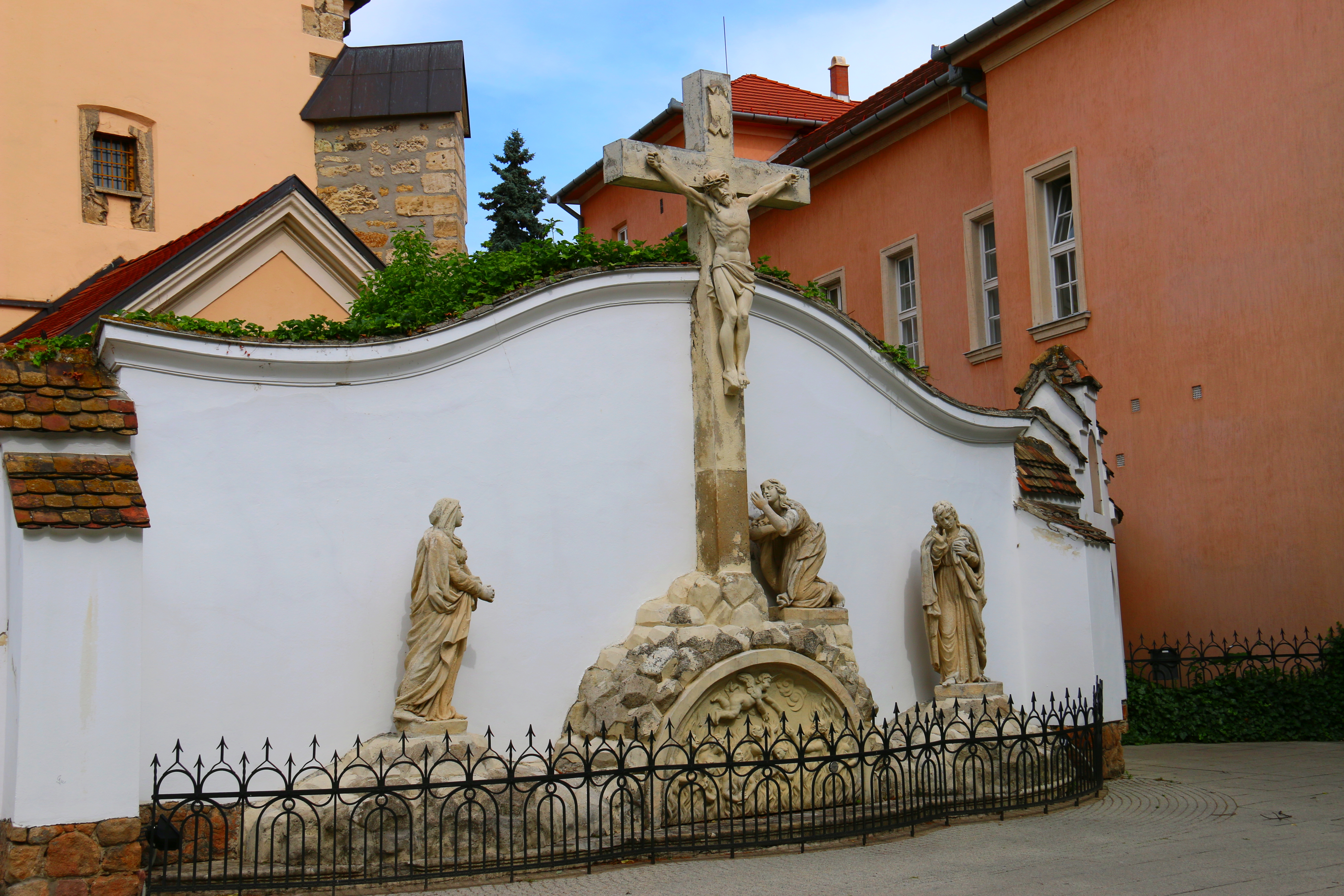
Crucifix in the centre of Kecskemét. 51.4% of the city's population are Christians.

The Hungarian Association of Photographers formed the Hungarian Photography Foundation in 1990. It alos helped raise funds for the restoration of an 18th-century building in Kecskemét; last used as an Orthodox synagogue, it was adapted for the Hungarian Museum of Photography (Magyar Fotográfiai Múzeum), which opened in 1991. The museum holds work by Hungarian and other photographers of international and national reputations. It collects especially Hungarian photographers who successfully worked abroad.

On 18 June 2008, the German car manufacturer Daimler announced that it would build a Mercedes-Benz manufacturing plant in Kecskemét and planned to invest €800 million (US$1.24 billion). The plant is one of the largest, if not the largest, ever in the region, and employs 2,500 people.

== Economy ==
In March 2012, the German automobile manufacturer Daimler AG opened a plant nearby Kecskemét to manufacture the new B-Class, A-Class and CLA-Class models. The Stuttgart-based company invested €800 million (US$1.24 billion) to build the new plant, which is expected to create 3,000 new jobs in the region. According to the plans, more than 100,000 vehicles will be produced annually at the factory.

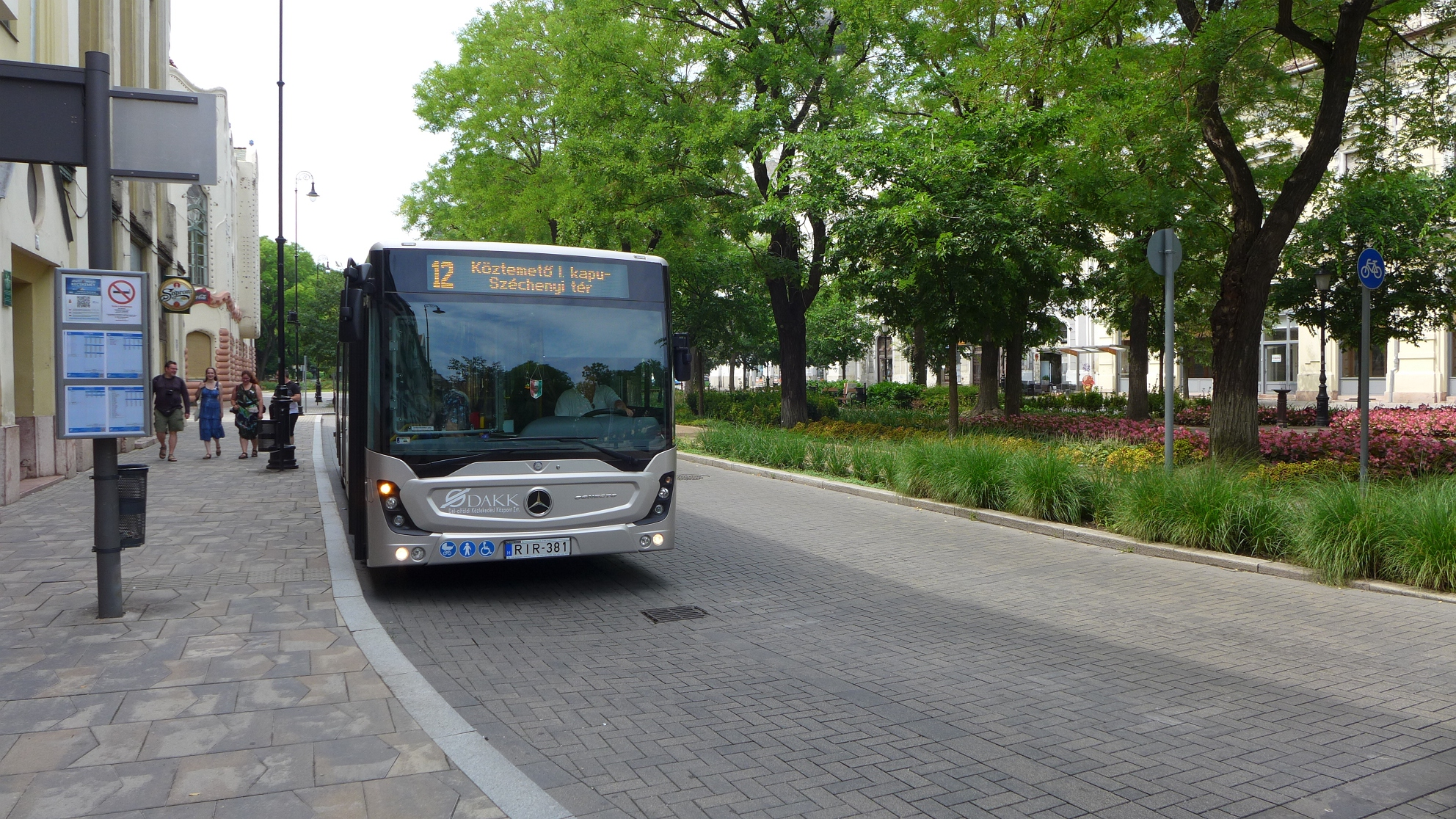
Mercedes-Benz Conecto on Line 12 at Kecskemét, operated by DAKK

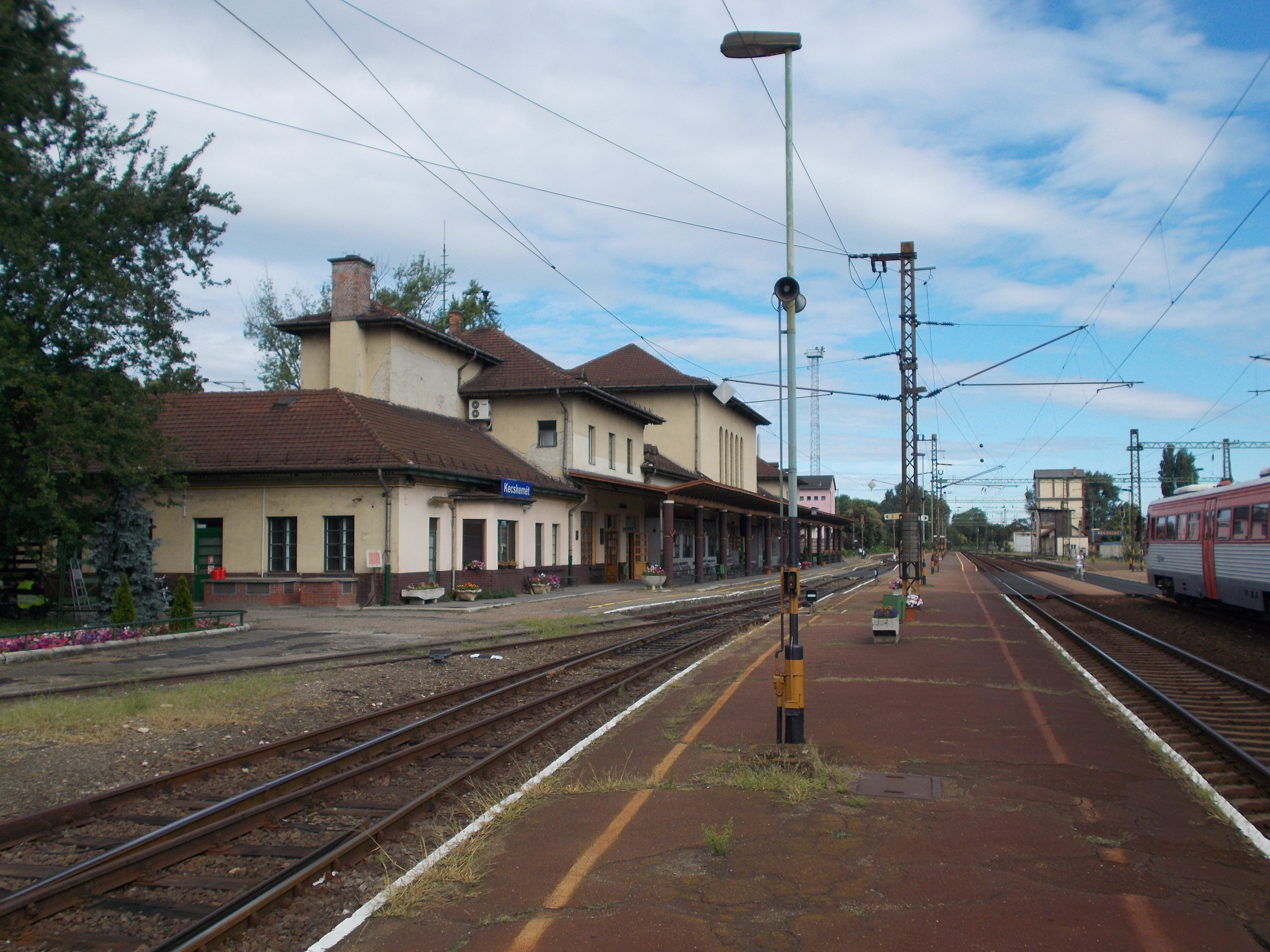
Kecskemét Railway Station

As of 2021, the largest companies were:

- Mercedes-Benz – cars: 5,000 employees
- Duvenbeck IMMO – logistics: 1,100 employees
- ACPS Automotive – towbars: 1,000 employees
- Knorr-Bremse – brakes: 950 employees
- Phoenix Mecano – enclosures and mechanical components: 850 employees
- CabTec – cable: 800 employees
- Fornetti – baked goods: 800 employees
- Univer Product – canned goods: 800 employees

Over the last few years, thousands of jobs have been created, causing an extremely low unemployment rate. In 2024, unemployment was 2,70%.

== Public transport ==
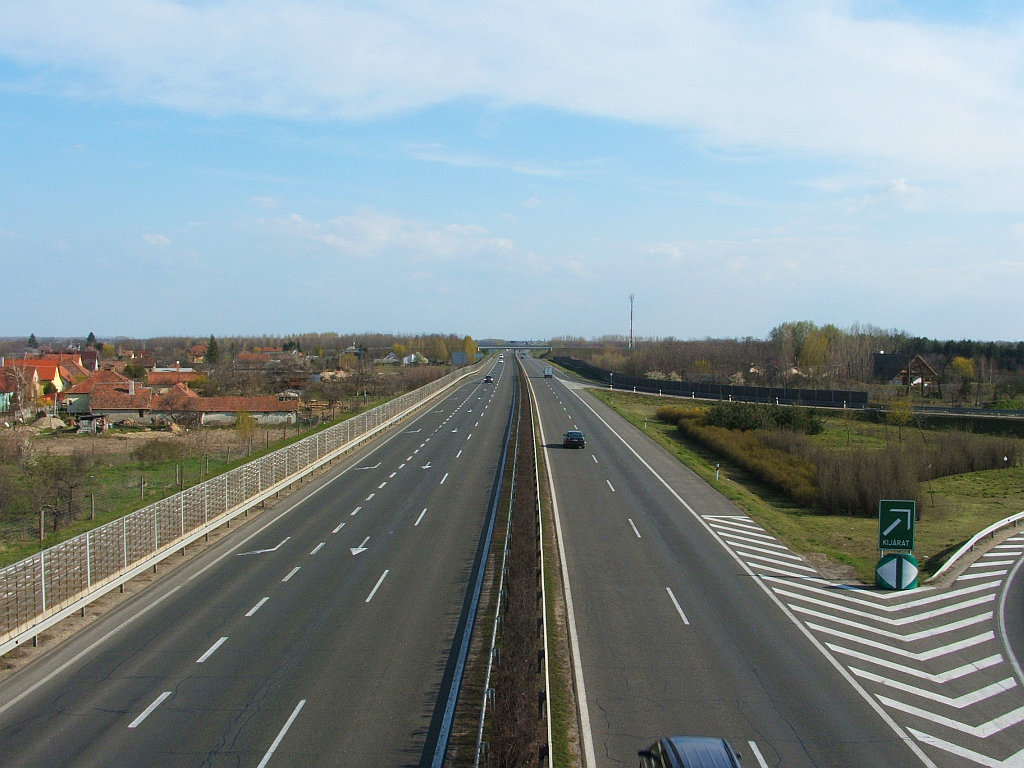
M5 motorway near Kecskemét

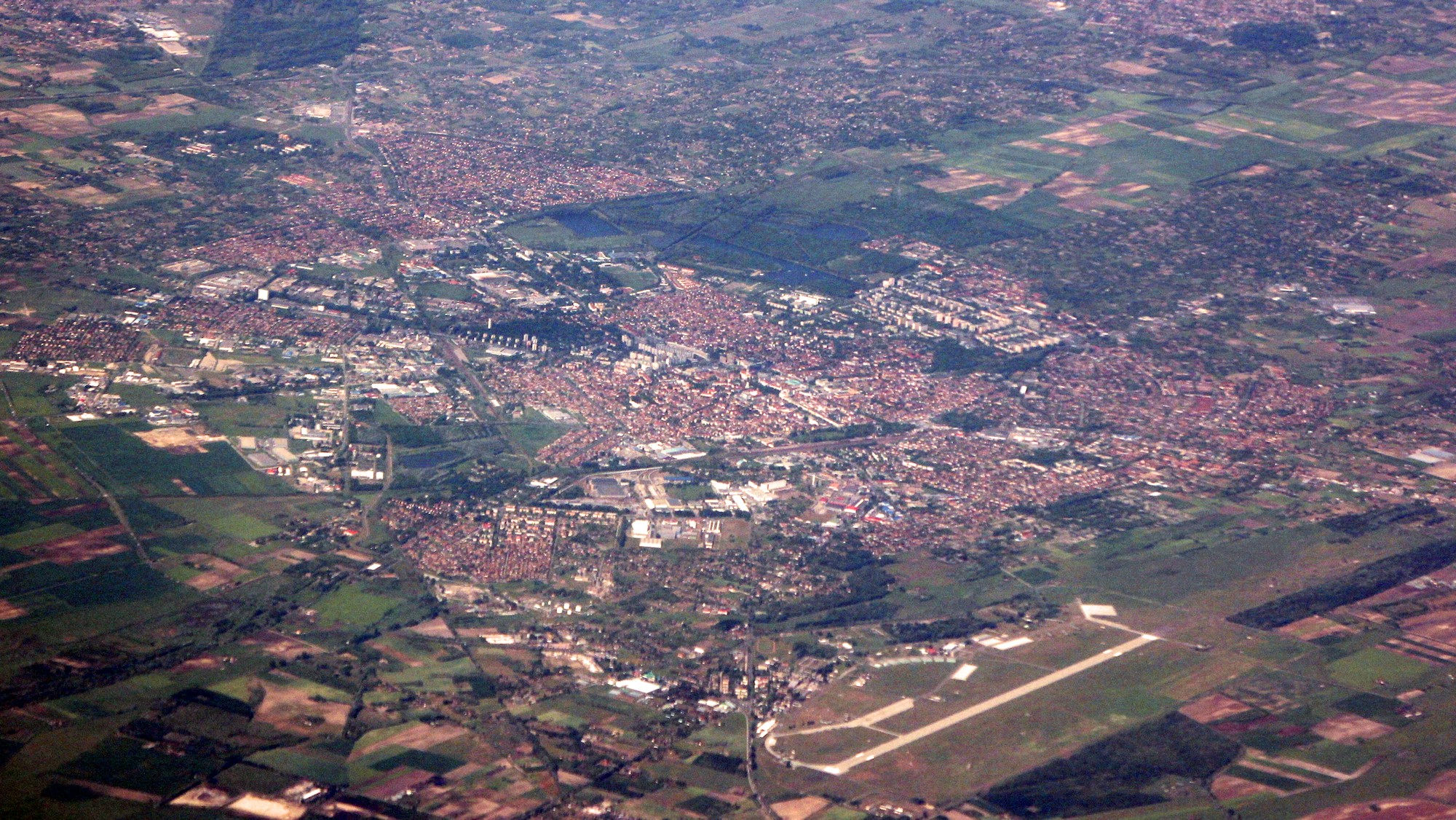
Aerial view with the air base

With the 1900s industrialisation of Hungary, Kecskemét developed public transportation by trams for a population of 50,000. Not until after the Second World War would bus travel begin in the city. In 2010, with competitive funding from the EU, the city launched a number of trolleybus lines and in 2011 completely rebuilt the town centre as a trolleybus and pedestrian tourist zone.

Currently, bus travel is the only public transportation to many destinations. Bus destinations (as of 2 November 2022):

- 1 Noszlopy park - GAMF - Homokbánya kollégium
- 1D Homokbánya kollégium - Mercedes gyár I. kapu
- 2 Széchenyi tér - Rendőrfalu
- 2A Széchenyi tér - Gokart Stadion
- 2D Noszlopy park - Mercedes gyár I. kapu
- 2S Noszlopy park - Déli Ipartelep - SMP gyár
- 3 Széchenyi tér - Műkertváros - Nyíri Úti Kórház
- 3A Széchenyi tér - Műkertváros
- 4 Margaréta Otthon - Széchenyi tér - Repülőtér
- 4A Széchenyi tér - Kisfái
- 4C Széchenyi tér - Repülőtér
- 5 Széchenyi tér - Máriaváros
- 6 Széchenyi tér - Szeleifalu
- 7 Noszlopy park - Knorr Bremse - Szilády Nyomda
- 7C Noszlopy park - Mindszenti körút
- 9 Széchenyi tér - Talfája köz
- 10 Széchenyi tér - TESCO M5 Hipermarket
- 11 Széchenyi tér - Petőfiváros - Kadafalvi út
- 11A Széchenyi tér - Petőfiváros - AUCHAN Kereskedelmi Központ
- 12 Margaréta Otthon - Belváros - Köztemető I. kapu
- 12D Hunyadiváros (Serleg utca) - Mercedes gyár I. kapu
- 13 Széchenyi tér - Knorr Bremse
- 13D Széchenyi tér - Mercedes-gyár I. kapu
- 13K Széchenyi tér - Georg Knorr út
- 14 Széchenyi tér - Széchenyiváros
- 14D Széchenyiváros (Margaréta Otthon) - Mercedes gyár I. kapu
- 15 Noszlopy park - Hetényegyháza
- 15D Hetényegyháza - Mercedes gyár I. kapu
- 16 Széchenyi tér - Miklovicsfalu
- 18 Széchenyi tér - Köztemető II. kapu
- 19 Noszlopy park - Miklóstelep
- 20 Széchenyi tér - Megyei Kórház - Széchenyiváros
- 20H Széchenyi tér - Köztemető II. kapu - Kórházak - Széchenyi tér
- 21 Noszlopy park - Széchenyiváros - Nagykörút - Noszlopy park
- 21D Noszlopy park - Kurucz körút - Mercedes gyár I. kapu
- 22 Noszlopy park - Csabay Géza körút - Nagykörút - Noszlopy park
- 23 Széchenyi tér - Katonatelep
- 23A Széchenyi tér - Hunyadiváros - Katonatelep
- 25 Noszlopy park - Műkertváros
- 28 Széchenyi tér - Szeleifalu
- 29 Széchenyi tér - Hetényegyháza
- 32 Noszlopy park - Matkó
- 34 Kadafalva - Széchenyiváros - Kadafalva
- 34A Széchenyi tér - Széchenyiváros - Kadafalva
- 34V Kadafalva - Petőfiváros - Kadafalva
- 169 Széchenyi tér - Miklovicsfalu - Széchenyi tér
- 350 Máriaváros vasútállomás - Széchenyiváros
- 353 Hetényegyháza vasútállomás - Hetényegyháza központ
- 354 Hetényegyháza vasútállomás - Hetényegyháza központ
- 916 Széchenyi tér - Talfája köz - Széchenyi tér

== Demographics ==
Significant minority groups
Nationality	Population (2011)
German	1,441
Romanian	334
Russian	181
Serbian	167
Croatian	130
Slovak	100

Kecskemét has 107,267 residents (as of 2001). The population is homogeneous, with a large Hungarian majority. A few thousand of the Romani minority live in the city; they formed their independent minority government in 1994. The demographics are 95% Hungarian, 0.8% Romani, 0.4% German, 0.2% Slovak; 4.8% other. The city had a thriving Jewish population before the Second World War, as represented by the grand synagogue. Most of the Jews were deported by the Nazi German forces in 1944 to concentration camps, where they were killed.

The vice president of the German minority in Kecskemet is Rozalia Neuendorf. Since 19 March 2007, there is also a minority self-government for Croats in Kecskemét.

== Districts ==
Historical population
Year	Pop.	±%
1739	19,556	—
1742	12,978	−33.6%
1784	22,356	+72.3%
1850	32,308	+44.5%
1857	41,539	+28.6%
1870	32,830	−21.0%
1880	35,122	+7.0%
1890	38,439	+9.4%
1900	46,059	+19.8%
1910	52,270	+13.5%
1920	55,153	+5.5%
1930	58,169	+5.5%
1941	63,256	+8.7%
1949	61,370	−3.0%
1960	71,226	+16.1%
1970	84,482	+18.6%
1980	96,882	+14.7%
1990	102,516	+5.8%
2001	107,749	+5.1%
2011	111,411	+3.4%
2022	108,334	−2.8%

Kecskemét is divided into 21+1 sections.

- Belváros (Downtown)
- I. Árpádváros (Árpádtown)
- II. Máriaváros (Marytown)
- III. Széchenyiváros (Széchenyitown)
- IV. Bethlenváros (Bethlentown)
- V. Rákócziváros (Rákóczitown)
- VI. Erzsébetváros (Elisabethtown)
- VII. Kossuthváros (Kossuthtown)
- VIII. Hunyadiváros (Hunyaditown)
- IX. Szent István-város (Műkertváros, Szolnoki-hegy) (Saint Stephen town)
- X. Szent László-város (Rendőrfalu) (Saint Ladislaus town)
- XI. Alsószéktó (Szeleifalu)
- XII. Felsőszéktó (Petőfiváros, Sutusfalu)
- XIII. Talfája
- XIV. Katonatelep
- XV. Repülőtér (Reptéri-lakótelep)
- XVI. Matkó
- XVII. Kadafalva
- XVIII. Szarkás
- XIX. Hetényegyháza
- XX. Méntelek
- XXI. Borbáspuszta

== Main sights ==
- City Hall
- "Cifra Palota"
- Co-Cathedral of the Ascension of the Lord, Kecskemét
- Old Church
- Synagogue
- József Katona Theatre
- Hungarian Museum of Photography
- Museum of Hungarian Naive Artists
- MiG-21 Monument
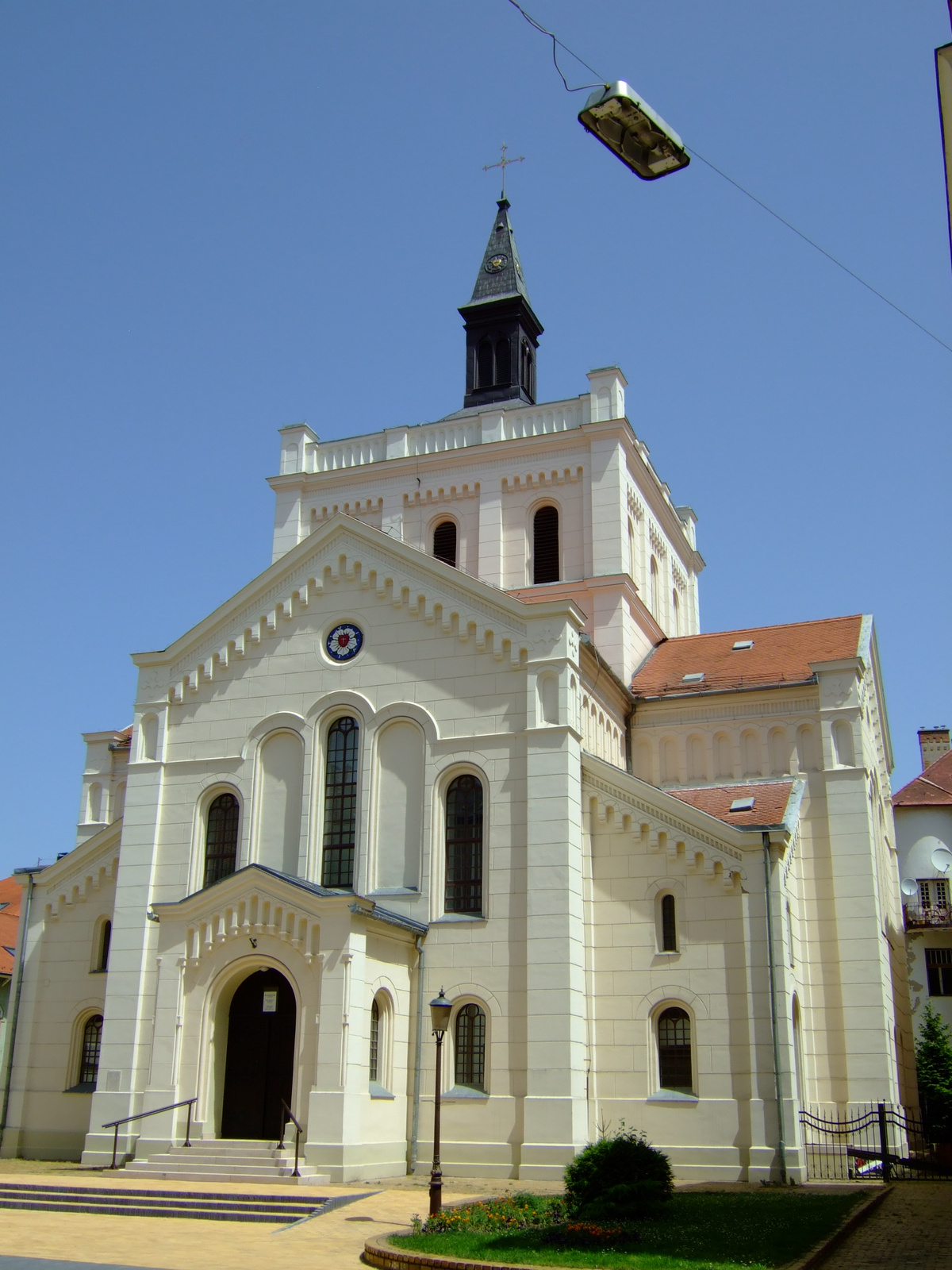
Evangelical Church

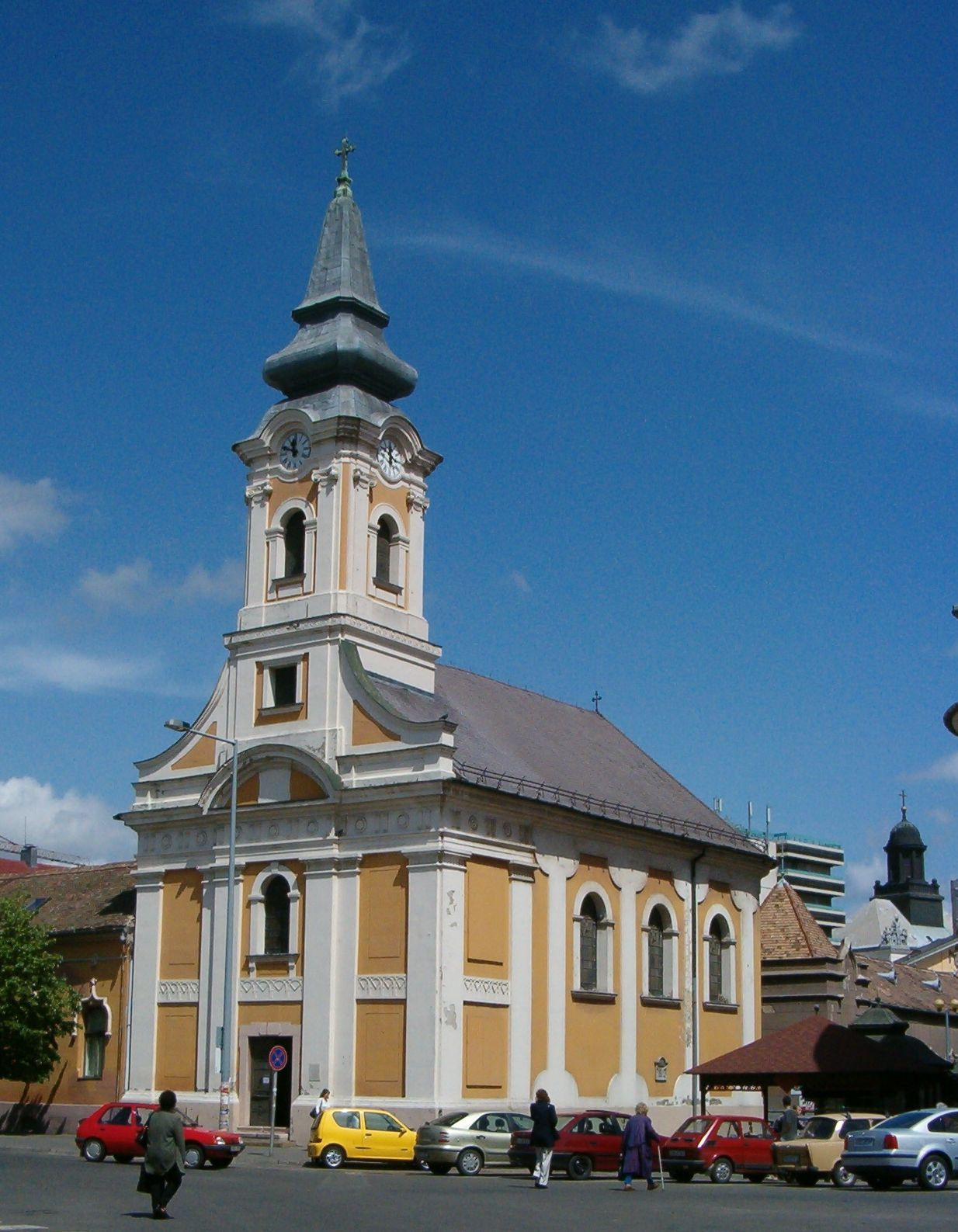
Orthodox Church

== Activities ==
- Adventure Spa & Waterslide Park
- Kecskemét Baths
- Kecskemét Wild Park
- Katona József Theatre of Kecskemét
- Kecskemét Arboretum

== Events ==
- Csiperó - Future of Europe International childrend and youth meeting
- Kecskemét Animation Film Festival
- Kecskemét Air Show

== Politics ==
The current mayor of Kecskemét is Klaudia Szemereyné Pataki (Fidesz-KDNP).

The local Municipal Assembly, elected at the 2019 local government elections, is made up of 21 members (one mayor, 14 individual constituencies MEPs and six compensation list MEPs) divided into the following political parties and alliances:

Party	Seats	Current Municipal Assembly
Fidesz-KDNP	12	M
Alliance for Hírös City (Note: Supported by Opposition coalition.)	9	

=== List of mayors ===
List of city mayors from 1990:

Member	Party	Term of office
Endre Bányai	MDF	1990
József Merász	Independent	1990–1994
László Katona	MDF	1994–1998
Gábor Szécsi	Fidesz	1998–2006
Gábor Zombor	Fidesz-KDNP	2006–2014
Klaudia Szemereyné Pataki	Fidesz-KDNP	2014–

== Notable natives and residents ==
- Nicolas Abraham (1919–1975), French psychoanalyst
- Tamás Adamik (born 1937), Hungarian linguist and professor
- József Katona (1791–1830), author
- Zoltán Kodály (1882–1967), Hungarian composer, ethnomusicologist, educator, linguist and philosopher; a music conservatory was named in his honor; the train station was built on the site of his family's house
- Ákos Kónya (born 1974), ultramarathoner
- Kálmán Latabár (1902–1970), actor, comedian
- Antal Szabó (1875–1926), painter
- Kati Zsigóné (born 1953), artist

== Twin towns – sister cities ==
Kecskemét is twinned with:

- Aomori, Japan
- Berehove, Ukraine
- Coventry, England, United Kingdom
- Dornbirn, Austria
- Galanta, Slovakia
- Hyvinkää, Finland
- Lidköping, Sweden
- Nahariya, Israel
- Rüsselsheim am Main, Germany
- Sfântu Gheorghe, Romania
- Târgu Mureș, Romania
- Tekirdağ, Turkey
- Wadowice, Poland

=== Friendly cities ===
Kecskemét also cooperates with:

- Großenhain, Germany
- Novi Sad, Serbia
- Tábor, Czech Republic

== Military ==
The MH 59th "Dezső Szentgyörgyi" Tactical Wing, the only jet fighter unit of the Hungarian Defence Forces, is based at Kecskemét air force base. The Kecskemét Air Show is held here every two years.

== Sport ==
- Kecskeméti TE, association football club
- Kecskeméti LC, association football club
