= Miklós Soltész =

Hungarian politician (born 1963)

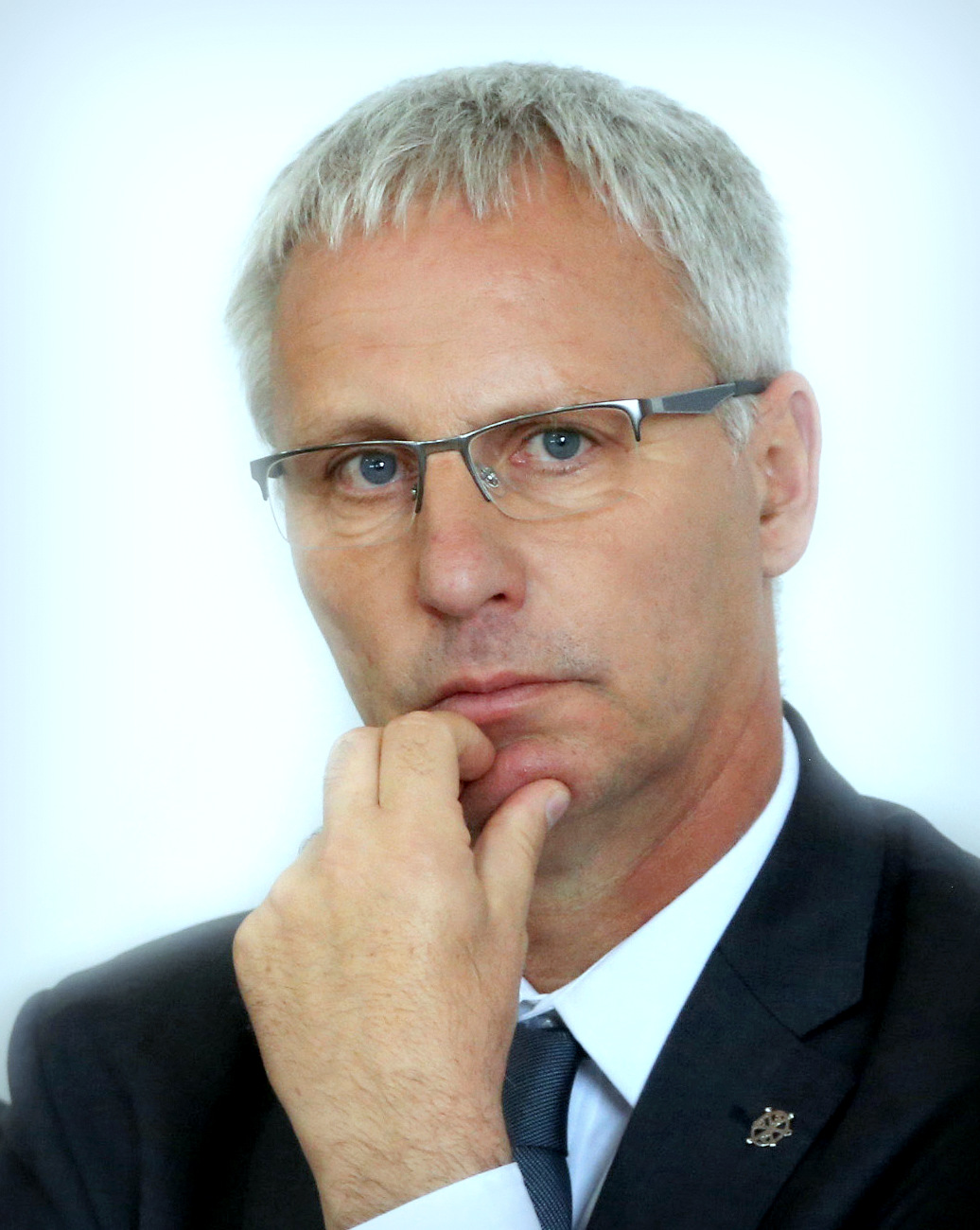
- Miklós Soltész in 2016

Secretary of State for Churches, Minorities and Civil Affairs
- In office 15 June 2014 – 12 June 2026
- Minister: Zoltán Balog; Gergely Gulyás
- Preceded by: György Hölvényi

Secretary of State for Social and Family Affairs
- In office 2 June 2010 – 5 June 2014
- Minister: Miklós Réthelyi; Zoltán Balog
- Preceded by: László Herczog (as Minister of Social Affairs and Labour)
- Succeeded by: Katalin Novák (Family and Youth Affairs); Károly Czibere^{(Social Affairs and Inclusion)}

Member of the National Assembly
- In office 15 May 2002 – 8 May 2026

Personal details
- Born: 23 July 1963 (age 62) Budapest, Hungary
- Party: MKDSZ (1997–2002); KDNP (since 2002)
- Children: 4
- Profession: plant engineer, politician

Miklós Soltész (born 23 July 1963) is a Hungarian plant engineer and politician, who served as Secretary of State for Social and Family Affairs in the Second Orbán Government between 2010 and 2014. He served as Secretary of State for Churches, Minorities and Civil Affairs since 2014 in the Third Orbán Government. He was also Member of Parliament (MP) from 2002 to 2026, representing the Christian Democratic People's Party (KDNP).
