= Day of Hungarian Healthcare =

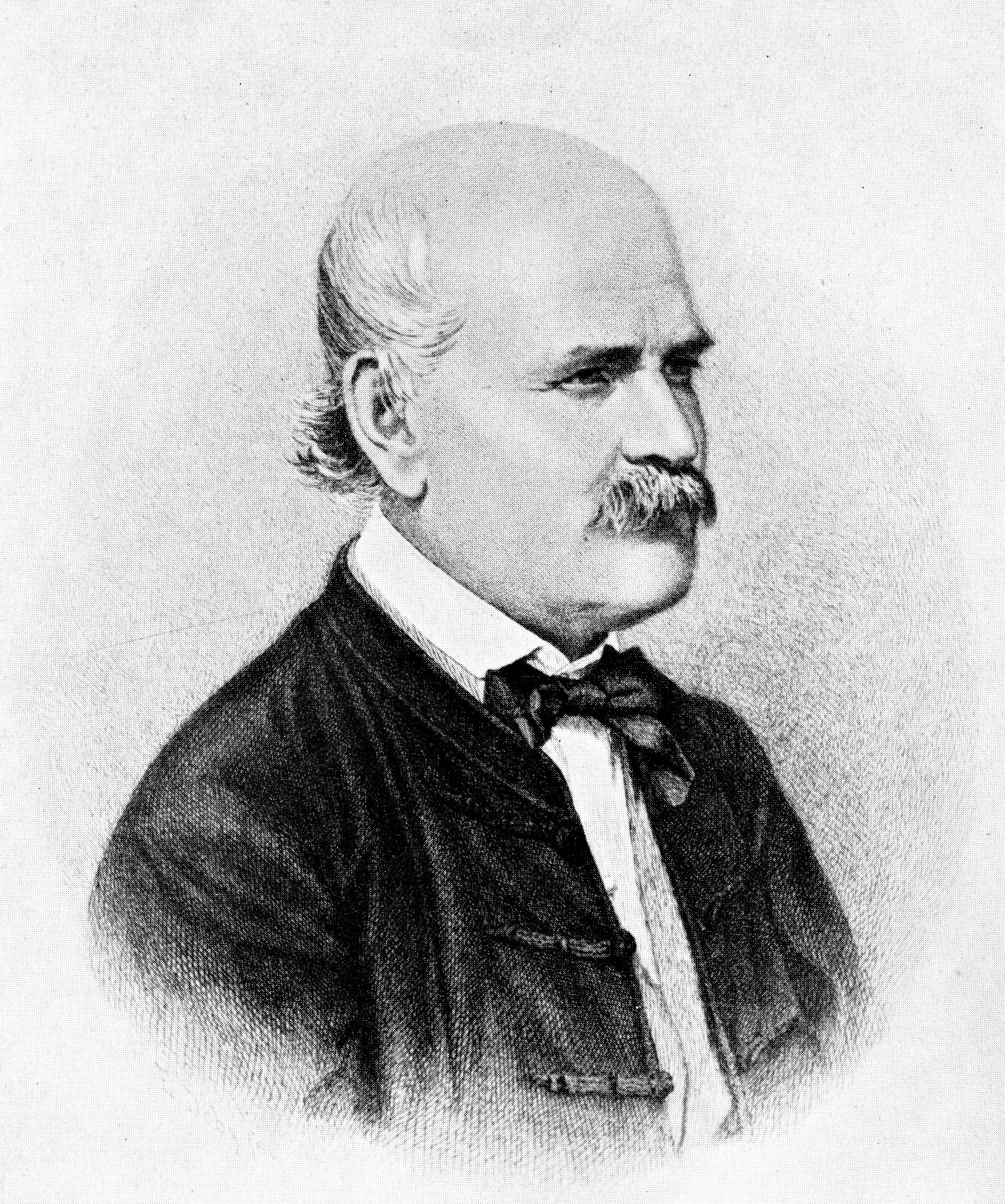
- Ignaz Semmelweis
- Official name: Semmelweis Day
- Observed by: Hungarian healthcare workers
- Type: National
- Significance: Celebration of Hungarian healthcare workers
- Date: July 1
- Related to: Day of Public Servants and Government Employees

Day of Hungarian Healthcare (also known as Semmelweis Day or Ignaz Semmelweis Day) has been celebrated annually on July 1 in Hungary since 1992. On this day in 1818, Ignaz Semmelweis, the Hungarian physician known as the "savior of mothers", was born in the Tabán district of Buda. He played a significant role in the fight against puerperal fever through his empirical discovery of its cause.

== History ==
In March 1992, the Hungarian Parliament passed Act XXIII, which established this commemorative day on July 1, the same day as the Day of Public Servants and Government Employees. On this day, professional recognitions are awarded, and celebrations are held across the country. Around this holiday, several awards are given out, including the Semmelweis University's Mária Kopp Media Award, the titles of Professor Emerita and Emeritus, and appointments of university officials.

== Declaration as a public holiday ==
In November 2010, Miklós Réthelyi, Hungary's Minister of National Resources, submitted a legislative amendment to the National Assembly proposing that Semmelweis Day be declared a public holiday for healthcare workers. He argued that it would serve to "recognize the work of healthcare workers and raise their prestige". The proposal suggested the addition of §15/B to Act LXXXIV of 2003 on specific aspects of healthcare activities, stating: "July 1 is Semmelweis Day, which is a public holiday for healthcare workers and those employed in the healthcare sector." Thanks to this proposal, the amendment came into force on January 1, 2011, making July 1 a public holiday for healthcare workers and employees in the healthcare sector in Hungary.
