= Gábor Zombor =

Hungarian physician and politician

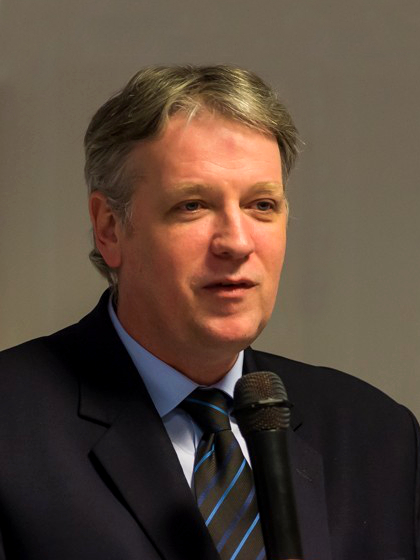

Secretary of State for Health
- In office 24 June 2014 – 8 September 2015
- Minister: Zoltán Balog
- Preceded by: Miklós Szócska
- Succeeded by: Zoltán Ónodi-Szűcs

Mayor of Kecskemét
- In office 1 October 2006 – 24 June 2014
- Preceded by: Gábor Szécsi
- Succeeded by: Klaudia Szemerey-Pataki

Member of the National Assembly
- In office 16 May 2006 – 1 May 2022

Personal details
- Born: 12 March 1964 (age 62) Kecskemét, Hungary
- Party: Fidesz
- Spouse: Boglárka Tüske
- Children: Boglárka; Zsófia; Lilla; Gábor
- Profession: physician

Dr. Gábor Zombor (born 12 March 1964) is a Hungarian physician and politician, who served as the mayor of Kecskemét between 2006 and 2014. He was the Secretary of State for Health from 24 June 2014 to 8 September 2015, until his resignation. He was also member of the National Assembly (MP) for Kecskemét (Bács-Kiskun County Constituency I then II) from 2010 to 2022. He was MP from the Bács-Kiskun County Regional List of Fidesz from 2006 to 2010.

== Career ==
He was born in Kecskemét. He finished his secondary studies at the Móra Ferenc Grammar School in Kiskunfélegyháza in 1982. He graduated in general medicine from the Albert Szent-Györgyi Medical University in Szeged in 1989. He then worked in the obstetrics of the hospital in Kiskunfélegyháza. Between 1990 and 1995, he was a general practitioner in Kunbaja and a research fellow at MSD Kft., the Hungarian subsidiary of a large American pharmaceutical company. Between 1994 and 1996 he was a member of the Bács-Kiskun County Assembly. From 1995 to 1999 he was Chief Physician of Baja, Health Officer of the Mayor's Office. In 1995–1996 he was the president of the Bács-Kiskun county branch of the Fidesz party. In 1999, he obtained a second law degree at the Janus Pannonius University of Pécs. Between 1999 and 2000, he was the director of the Budapest and Pest County Health Insurance Funds. Between March 2000 and July 1, 2006, he was the director general of the Bács-Kiskun County Municipal Hospital in Kecskemét.

In the parliament, Zombor was a member of the Committee on Youth, Social Affairs and the Family from 2006 to 2010, of the Health Committee from 2010 to 2014, and of the Welfare Committee in 2014 (chairman) and from 2015 to 2022.

Zombor did not run in the 2022 Hungarian parliamentary election. Gyula Tamás Szeberényi succeeded him as candidate of Fidesz in Kecskemét constituency, who eventually won the mandate.

== Personal life ==
He is married to Boglárka Tüske. They have together four children — three daughters, Boglárka, Zsófia, Lilla and a son, Gábor.
