= Klaudia Szemereyné Pataki =

Hungarian economist and politician (born 1976)

Mayor of Kecskemét
- Incumbent
- Assumed office 24 June 2014
- Preceded by: Gábor Zombor

Member of the National Assembly
- In office 8 April 2013 – 5 May 2014

Personal details
- Born: 4 March 1976 (age 50) Kecskemét, Hungary
- Party: Fidesz
- Spouse: Szabolcs Szemerey
- Children: 1
- Profession: economist

Klaudia Szemereyné Pataki (née Pataki; born 4 March 1976) is a Hungarian politician, member of the National Assembly (MP) from Fidesz Bács-Kiskun County Regional List from 2013-14.

She graduated from the Corvinus University of Budapest in 2007, after that she participated in a further education at the University of Exeter in 2011. She served as leader of the Fidesz group in the General Assembly of Kecskemét between 2006 and 2010. She currently serves as deputy mayor for economic affairs since 2008. She functioned as Ministerial Commissioner for Automotive Course, Research and Development between 6 December 2012 and 3 March 2013.

Szemereyné Pataki became MP for Bács-Kiskun County in April 2013, replacing her distant relative György Matolcsy, who was appointed Governor of the Hungarian National Bank, and as a result he resigned from his parliamentary seat on 3 March 2013.

Szemerey-Pataki became interim mayor of Kecskemét on 24 June 2014, replacing fellow Fidesz member Gábor Zombor. She was elected mayor with full term in the 2014 local election. She was re-elected mayor in the 2019 local elections, obtaining 50.21 percent of the vote.

== Personal life ==
She is married to Szabolcs Szemerey. They have two daughters, Szinta and Szelina.
