= Miklós Kásler =

Hungarian politician (1950–2025)

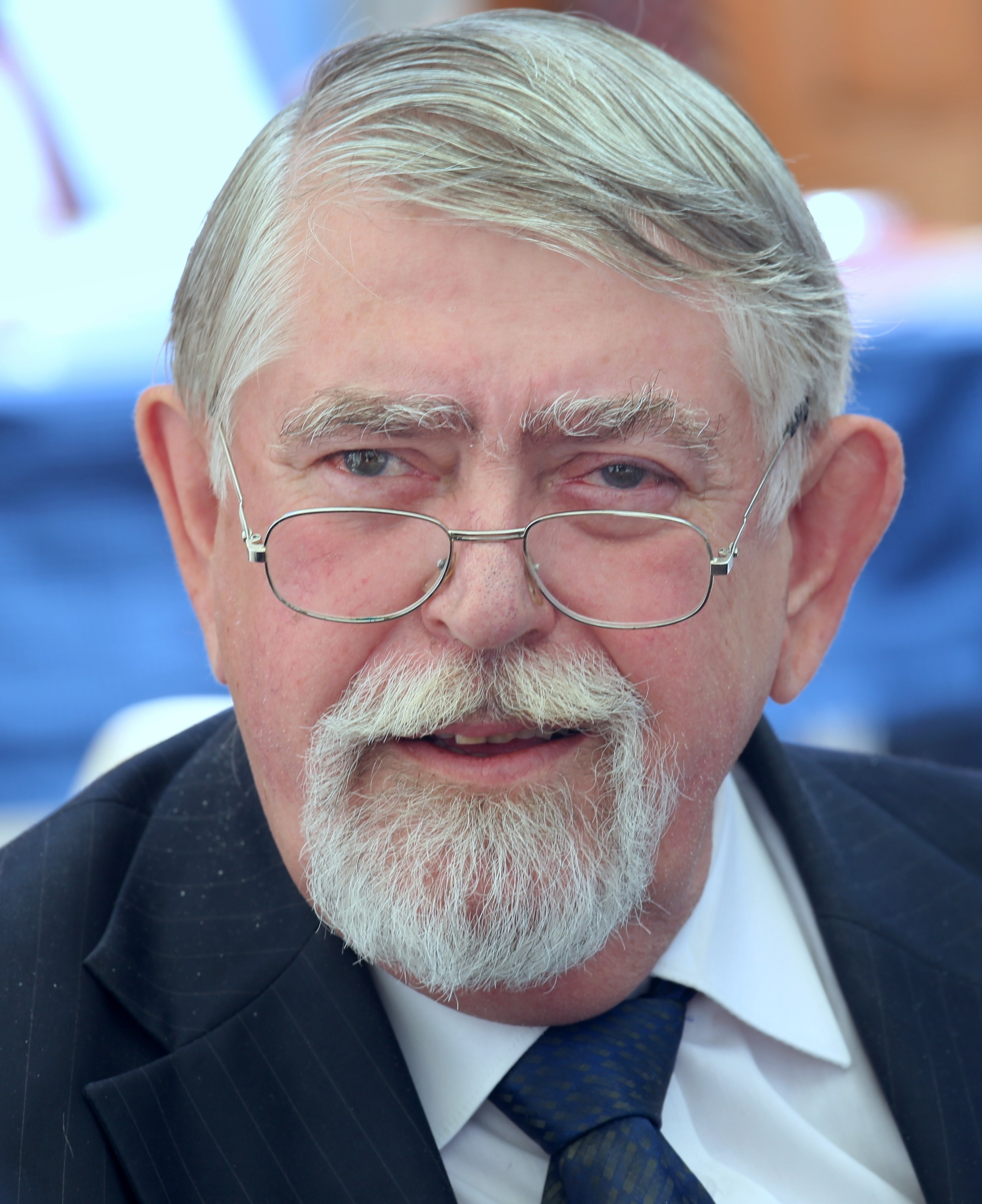
- Kásler in 2017

Minister of Human Resources
- In office 18 May 2018 – 24 May 2022
- President: János Áder; Katalin Novák
- Prime Minister: Viktor Orbán
- Preceded by: Zoltán Balog
- Succeeded by: Office abolished

Personal details
- Born: 1 March 1950 Budapest, Hungary
- Died: 5 September 2025 (aged 75)
- Spouse: Cecília Lányi
- Children: 1
- Education: University of Szeged
- Profession: Oncologist; surgeon

Miklós Kásler (1 March 1950 – 5 September 2025) was a Hungarian oncologist, academic, director of the National Institute of Oncology and Minister of Human Resources from 2018 to 2022.

== Background ==
"Each result of science proves that there is a spiritual existence in the world where everything can be traced back to."

— Miklós Kásler

His father, István Kásler (born 1918, Déva) was a jurist and his mother, Aranka Boda (born 1923, Sárvár) was a pedagogue. On his father's side he has Bukovina German and Bukovina Székely ancestors from Andrásfalva (Romanian: Măneuți).

He was born in Budapest, but the family moved to Sárvár, so he attended the primary and secondary schools there. Later he studied medicine at the University of Szeged and graduated in 1974. Then he took exams in surgery (1978), oral surgery (1988), plastic and reconstructional surgery (1998) and oncology (2009).

From 1969, he worked in the Institute of Medical Chemistry of the University of Szeged as demonstrator and from 1971 in the Microbiology Institute as a TDK member. He became a clinical physician in 1974 at the No. 2 Surgeon Clinic and from 1978 an instructor.

He came to the National Oncological Institute in 1981 where he became lecturer in 1984 and chief medical officer of the head-neck surgery department in 1986. He was nominated to director of the institute. He established the National Cancer Control Program for the heterogeneous medical care of cancer patients in 1993.

From 1994, he was professor at the Semmelweis University and head of department at three universities (Semmelweis University, University of Pécs, University of Medicine and Pharmacy of Târgu Mureș) from 1998. From 2007 he was director of the oncological department of the University of Pécs. His scientific degrees were doctoral candidate (1984), Doctor of MTA (2010), member of the European Academy of Sciences and Arts (2017).

During his scientific activity he wrote 16 professional books, 7 books, 76 book parts, more than 250 in and internationally published announcements and gave lectures on many national and international occasions on several institutes.

Kásler died on 5 September 2025, at the age of 75.

== Public activity ==
Kásler always showed great interest in Hungarian history and historical fate questions. His opinion is that the human of today has lost his way and his values. A kind of moral interregnum is formed when a part of the old classical, through century defecated values is lost by the humans and is now looking for a way to the solution.

He appeared in a talk show on M1, a government-controlled national television channel with similarly-thinking guests (writers, scientists, and philosophers) on a series of interviews about national fate with the title Nemzeti nagyvizit (transl. National Great Visitation).

Kásler was a special guest of the 777blog.hu Christian public portal interview series in March 2018, when he explained how the scientists serve God and science at the same time, so serving God through science. He also gave his point of view detailed on the issue:

Today there is a lot of knowledge that is not timeless. It would be important - thanks to God there is already examples - to teach ethics, religion, and religious morality. The Ten Commandments are not just religious instructions, not dogmas, but the most perfect code of law. My lawyer father - I also studied law - always said that if you do not break the Ten Commandments, you will never face the law or your fellow human beings. It is also a perfect code of ethics. I, as a doctor, say it is a public health program as well, because if it is obeyed, it is possible to avoid contagious sexually transmitted diseases, some cancerous diseases, but also a significant part of mental and vegetative diseases.

— Életünk Vol 54 Nr 12 (2016) : Az onkológia professzora

Kásler was a member of an international research group which came up with a result on the controversial prehistory of Hungarians which confirmed the fact that the members of the Árpád dynasty are certainly from the Eurasian blood line, as genetic markers can be used to map the pharynx genetic history. Researchers determined Béla III's genetic profile on his father's line. The research team concluded that Béla III's DNA fragment extracted from his bone belongs to the typically co-inherited R1a haplotype. This "finding" neither falls within his area of medical expertise (genetic analysis is not part of cancer medicine), nor does it have anything with the "origin of Hungarians," which is an "interpretation" Kásler and his fan base attribute to it.

In April 2018, Kásler was appointed Minister of Human Resources.

== Awards ==
- Krompecher Medallion (1999)
- Endre Mester Medallion (2001)
- Aurél Réthy Medallion (2001)
- Markusovszky Kórház Jubileum Plaque (2004)
- László Batthyány-Strattmann Award (2005)
- World Council of Hungarian Professors Pro Universitate et Scientia (2005)
- Diploma Honori (University of Medicine and Pharmacy of Târgu Mureș, 2005)
- Markusovszky Plaque (2006)
- Doktor Honoris Causa (University of Medicine and Pharmacy of Târgu Mureș, 2006)
- Order of Merit of the Republic of Hungary - Commander's Cross (2007)
- Markusovszky Award (2008)
- Prima Award (2008)
- Markusovszky Award and Diploma (2010)
- Honorary Citizen of Budapest (2011)
- Markusovszky Award (2012)
- Honorary Citizen of Sárvár (2012)
- Diploma of Fellowship of Royal College of Physicians and Surgeons of Glasgow (2012)
- Markusovszky Award (2013)
- Order of Merit of the Republic of Hungary - Commander's Cross with Star (2015)
- Conscience of the Hungarian Nation Award (2017)
- Honorary Perpetual Member of the Hungarian Oncologist Society (2017)
- Order of Saint Lazarus - Gold Medallion (2018)
- Ministerial Recognition Certificate (2018)
- Széchenyi Award (2018)

== Works ==
- Kásler Miklós: Az onkológia alapjai. Budapest: MEDICINA KÖNYVKIADÓ zRT. 2011. ISBN 978-963-226-345-8
- Kásler Miklós: Nemzeti nagyvizit. Földesi Margit, Kővári Péter, Szabados György. Kairosz. 2014. ISBN 978-963-662-730-0
- Géczi Lajos – Kásler Miklós: Prosztatarák - Gyakorlati kézikönyv. Budapest: ZAFÍR PRESS. 2014. ISBN 978-615-500-535-0
- Kásler Miklós: A komplex onkodiagnosztika és onkoterápia irányelvei. Budapest: SEMMELWEIS KIADÓ. 2008. ISBN 978-963-987-911-9
- Kásler Miklós: Onkoterápiás protokoll. Budapest: SPRINGER TUDOMÁNYOS KIADÓ. 1996. ISBN 9636990018
- Dr. Igazvölgyi Katalin – Kásler Miklós – Dr. Szűcs Miklós: A rákról röviden: Veszélyeztető tényezők - korai felismerés - VESZÉLYEZTETŐ TÉNYEZŐK - KORAI FELISMERÉS. Budapest: SPRINGMED KIADÓ KFT. 2004. ISBN 9799639456166
- Kásler Miklós – Dr. Pete Imre: Nőgyógyászati onkológia: Gyakorlati kézikönyv. Budapest: ZAFÍR PRESS. 2012. ISBN 9786155005282
- Várszegi Asztrik – Kásler Miklós – Iván László: Gondolatok a „jó öregséghez”: Várszegi Asztrik és Kásler Miklós előadása, Iván László előszavával. Budapest: Gondolat kiadó. 2010. ISBN 978 963 693 297 8

== Publications ==
- Kásler, Miklós and Ottó, Szabolcs : Európai és hazai kihívások az onkológiában, Magyar Onkológia, 2008
