= Gyula Budai =

Hungarian politician

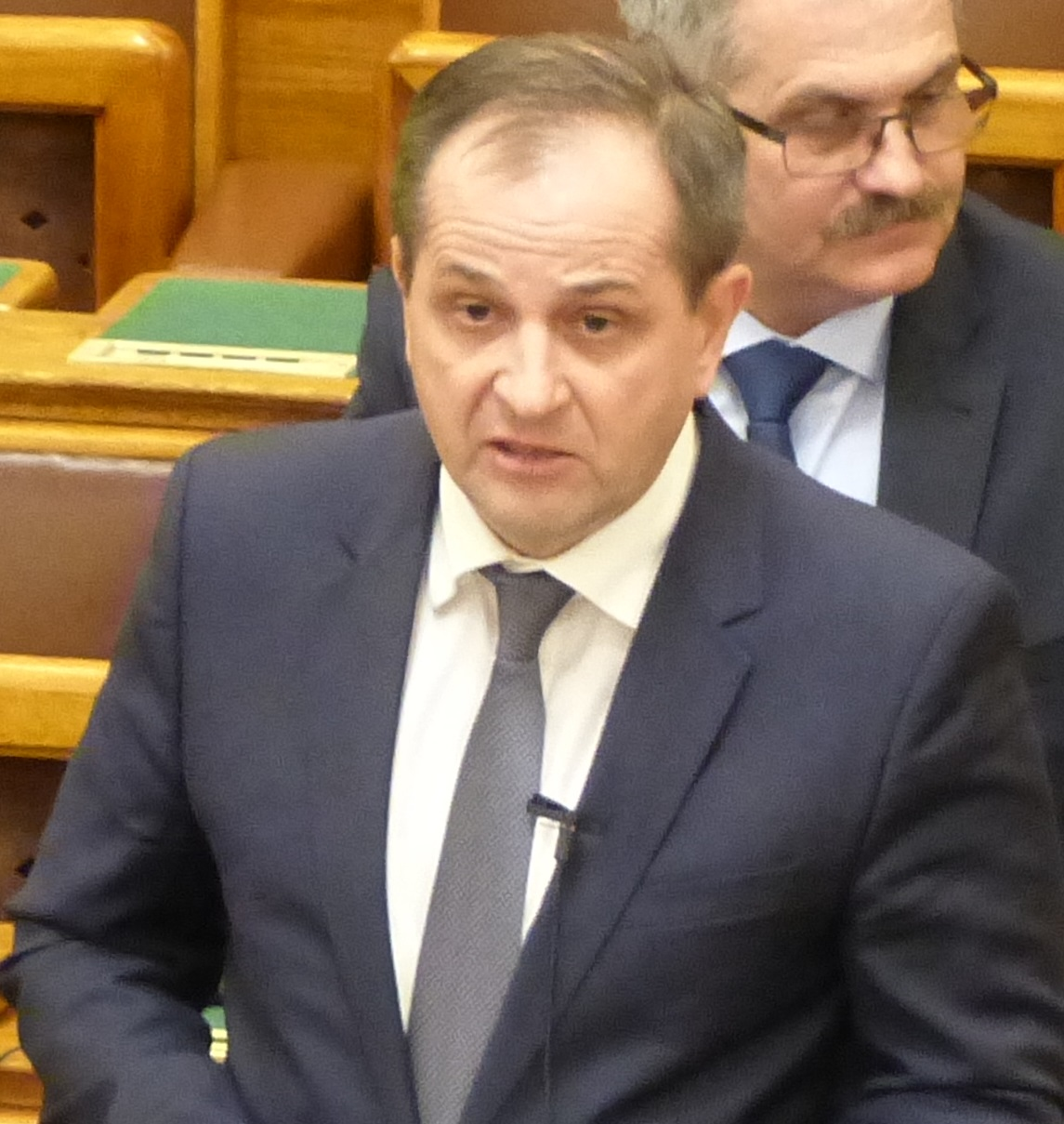

Member of the National Assembly
- In office 29 October 2018 – 3 August 2026
- In office 14 May 2010 – 7 May 2018

Personal details
- Born: 2 April 1963 (age 63) Békéscsaba, Hungary
- Party: Fidesz
- Children: 2
- Profession: politician, jurist

Gyula Budai (born 2 April 1963) is a Hungarian politician, member of the National Assembly (MP) for Nagykálló (Szabolcs-Szatmár-Bereg County Constituency IV) between 2010 and 2014. He became MP from his party's national list during the 2014 parliamentary election, holding the seat until May 2018. He was re-elected MP in October 2018. He had been a government commissioner in charge of investigations into privatisation deals since July 2010. He served as Deputy Mayor of Kiskunlacháza for a short time in 2010.

== Early life ==
He finished his secondary studies at the Vasvári Pál Secondary Grammar School in Nyíregyháza. He attended the Faculty of Law at the Eötvös Loránd University (ELTE) since 1982, where he earned a degree in 1987. Thereafter he worked as a jurist for the Military Prosecutor's Office of Budapest. He practiced as a lawyer since 1994, owning the law firm Budai & Kovács; he suspended his legal profession on 1 December 2010. His law firm involved in a document forgery case regarding a disadvantageous land sale and purchase agreement, but no accusation was made due to the limitation period in November 2010.

== Political career ==
Budai joined Fidesz in 1997. He functioned as a legal expert to assist the work of the party's parliamentary caucus during the first cabinet of prime minister Viktor Orbán. After the 2002 parliamentary election, he continued his work as an external expert, involving in parliamentary inquiry committees. Since 2004, he was counsel of the Fidesz-ally National Alliance of Hungarian Farmers (MAGOSZ). He was one of the organizers of the 2005 farmer protests in Budapest and negotiated with the Ferenc Gyurcsány government in this capacity. He was elected federal director of the advocacy organization during their delegate assembly in Kistelek on 28 May 2006. Budai was a representative in the local assembly of Kiskunlacháza between 2006 and 2010. He also served as deputy mayor of the town briefly in 2010.

He was elected a Member of Parliament for Nagykálló in the 2010 parliamentary election, when Fidesz gained two-thirds majority and Orbán became prime minister for the second time. Budai was a member of the Consumer Protection Committee for a short time in May–June 2010. Thereafter he was involved in the Constitutional, Judicial and Standing Orders Committee from 8 June 2010 to 12 March 2012 and the Defense and Law Enforcement Committee from 13 December 2010 to 5 March 2012. Briefly in 2011, he also worked in the Sub-committee on the causes of debt growth between 2002 and 2010.

Viktor Orbán appointed Budai as Government Commissioner in charge of investigation of "the illegal wasting of state lands" on 11 June 2010. He examined the policy of the previous Socialist government in this context. He became Government Commissioner for Accountability and Anti-Corruption in November 2010, replacing Ferenc Papcsák. his role was to name former government officials who participated in economic decision-making which "clearly damaged the country and taxpayers", and to take legal steps to hold those former officials accountable. He held the position until 31 August 2012, when he was dismissed, two months before the expiration of the term of office (November 2012). During the 22 months, Budai and his staff investigated 1,442 cases, made 110 public reports and filed criminal charges in 61 cases. By August 2012, 30 cases were held at the investigation stage, while indictments were filed in 7 cases in connection with his accusations (including the suspected land exchange in Sukoró and the sold properties of the Ministry of Defence). During the prosecution investigations, 47 people were suspected of having committed a criminal offense, and from this, the prosecution filed charges against 39 people. The Hungarian government called his work successful, while the opposition Hungarian Socialist Party (MSZP) evaluated his activity as a politically motivated task, and the "Budai ballons" were refuted by the prosecution one after another, in the absence of a criminal offense.

Budai held the position of state secretary in the Ministry of Rural Development since 1 March 2012, replacing József Ángyán. According to a leaked audio recording in August 2012, Budai admitted in a MAGOSZ forum in Csongrád that his ministry has cartiled for the price of the melon. "Me and the ministry were accused of cartelling by the Socialists. Please, yes, we cartilized for the producers. We told the chain stores how much the melon should be sold. So what's the problem? In two years the melon production area fell from 11 thousand hectares to 5 thousand hectares in Hungary. We want to restore the former production area, which is only possible for the producer to receive not only the cost of the product, but also to have at least 15-20 percent of the product. I do not care why the Economic Competition Office says I made cartelism. And then what can they do with me? Nothing. Or the ministry? Or with the government? [...] The European Union was upset about this, but we do not take a step backwards. If the Union does not like it, turn to Strasbourg or wherever it want." Budai also had several conflicts and libel cases with the operators of the Kishantos ecological model farm during his term as state secretary. Budai remained in this capacity until June 2014, when he was replaced by István Nagy in the Third Orbán Government.

Budai secured a mandate via his party's national list in the 2014 parliamentary election. He functioned as vice-chairman of the Justice Committee from June 2014 to May 2018. He was appointed a Ministerial Commissioner within the Ministry of Foreign Affairs and Trade on 1 September 2014. He was responsible for "that foreign trade steps, which come from the Russian import ban". He held the position until 1 March 2015. In November 2017, Budai stated "all judges are Communists" in Hungary. Budai lost his parliamentary seat during the 2018 parliamentary election, but was re-elected MP in October 2018 via the party's national list, replacing Zoltán Balog. He has been a member of the Legislative Committee since then. He was re-elected MP in 2018, 2022 and 2026, in all cases from the national list of Fidesz.
