= Miklós Réthelyi =

Hungarian physician and politician

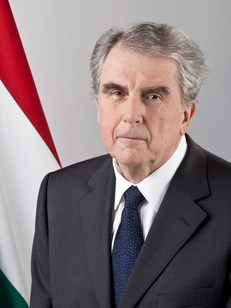

Minister of National Resources
- In office 29 May 2010 – 14 May 2012
- Preceded by: Position established
- Succeeded by: Zoltán Balog

Personal details
- Born: 8 June 1939 (age 85); Zalaegerszeg, Hungary
- Political party: Independent
- Spouse: Klára Szentágothai
- Relations: János Szentágothai (father-in-law)
- Children: 2 sons 1 daughter
- Profession: Politician

Miklós Réthelyi (born 8 June 1939 in Zalaegerszeg) is a Hungarian physician and politician, former Minister of National Resources. This "super ministry" consisted of State Secretaries of Sport (Attila Czene), Education (Rózsa Hoffmann), Social Affairs (Miklós Soltész), Health (Miklós Szócska) and Culture (Géza Szőcs) during his appointment. When he was appointed, he stated he will only complete two years from his four year-term. On 3 May 2012 he resigned from his office. He is the first and last Minister to the office with this name, as it was renamed to Ministry of Human Resources on 14 May 2012 with Zoltán Balog taking over as Réthelyi's successor.

== Main publications ==
- The large synaptic complexes of the substantia gelatinosa (with János Szentágothai, 1969)
- Cell and neuropil architecture of the intermedio-lateral (sympathetic) nucleus of the spinal cord (1972)
- A gerincvelő neuronális szerkezete (1972)
- Preterminal and terminal axon arborizations in the substantia gelatinosa of cat’s spinal cord (1977)
- Synaptic complexes formed by functionally defined primary afferent units with fine myelinated fibers (co-author, 1982)
- A fájdalomkeltő impulzusok gerincvelői feldolgozásának szerkezeti alapjai (1982)
- Ultrastructure and synaptic connections of cutaneous afferent fibres in the spinal cord (co-author, 1987)
- Funkcionális anatómia I.–III. (school book with János Szentágothai, 1989)
- The caudal end of the rat spinal cord: transformation to and ultrastructure of the filum terminale (co-author, 2004)
- Caudal end of the rat spinal dorsal horn (co-author, 2008)

Political offices
Preceded by István Hiller; Education and Culture	Minister of National Resources; 2010–2012	Succeeded by Zoltán Balog; Human Resources
Preceded by Tamás Székely; Health	Minister of National Resources; 2010–2012	Succeeded by Zoltán Balog; Human Resources
Preceded by László Herczog; Social Affairs and Labour	Minister of National Resources; 2010–2012	Succeeded by Zoltán Balog; Human Resources
