= Phoenix Mecano =

- Type: Ltd.
- Traded as: SIX: PMN
- ISIN: CH1261338102
- Industry: industrial electronics
- Founded: 1975
- Headquarters: Stein am Rhein (canton of Schaffhausen), Switzerland
- Key people: Benedikt Goldkamp (Chairman of the Board of Directors); Rochus Kobler (CEO); René Schäffeler (CFO); Lothar Schunk (COO)
- Revenue: €757.3 million (2025)
- Number of employees: 7,500 (2025)
- Website: www.phoenix-mecano.com

Phoenix Mecano AG is a Swiss technology company headquartered in Stein am Rhein, operating internationally in the fields of enclosure technology and industrial components. The company manufactures technical enclosures, electronic components, actuators, and system integrations. Phoenix Mecano employs around 7,500 people and generated sales of €757.3 million in 2025. Founded in 1975, Phoenix Mecano has been listed on the SIX Swiss Exchange since 1988.

== History ==
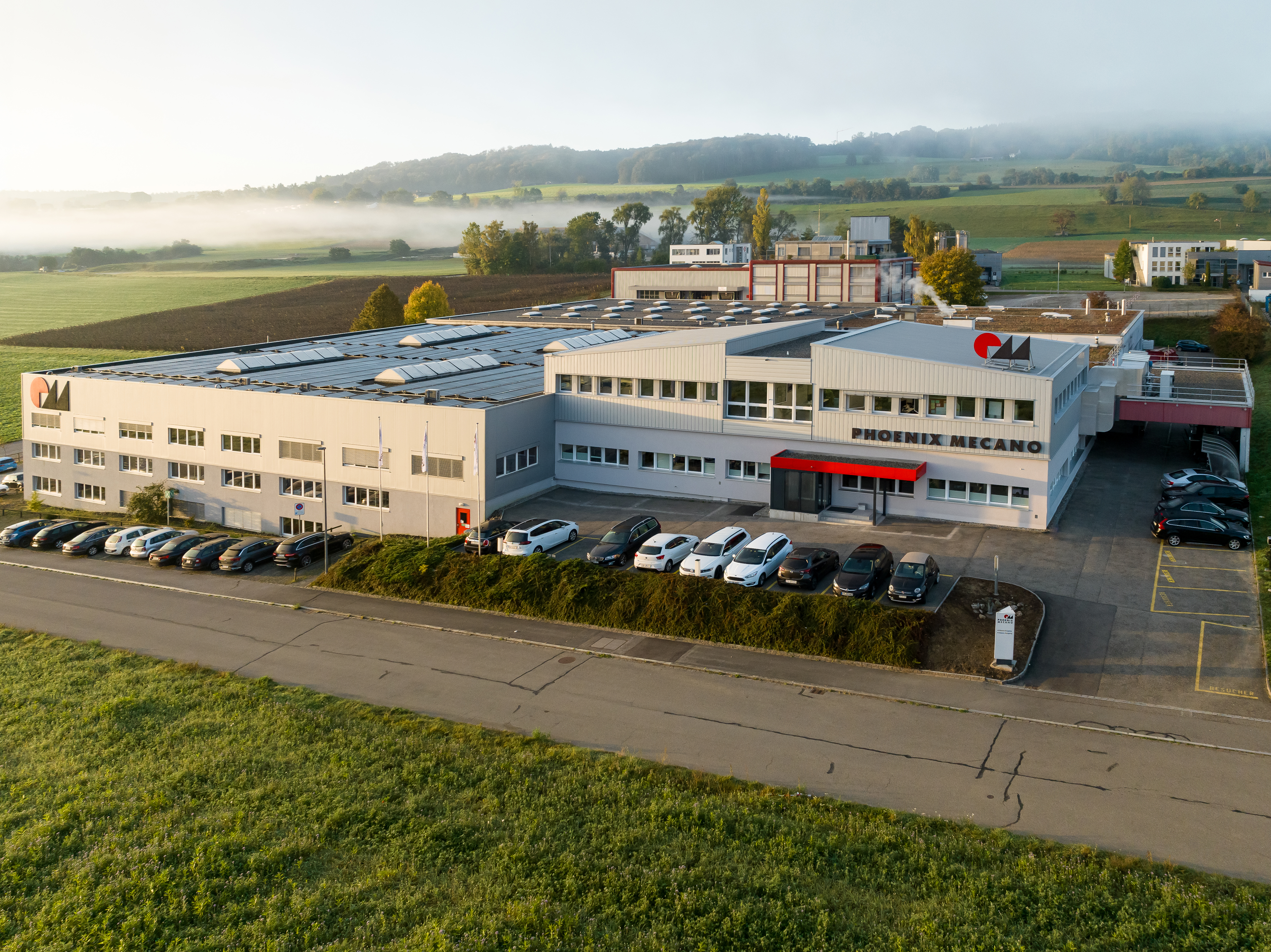
Phoenix Mecano headquarters

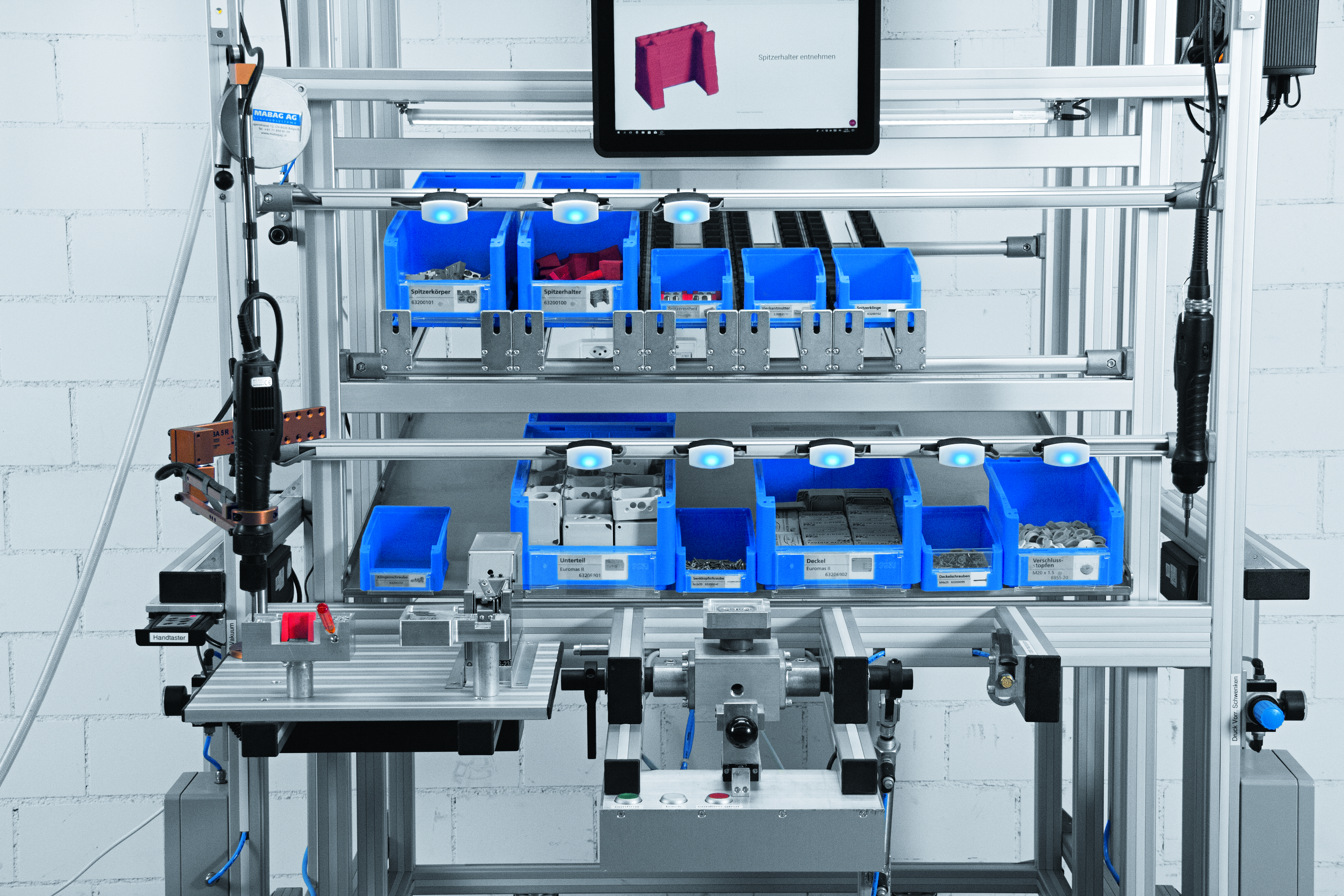
Pick-to-light workstation

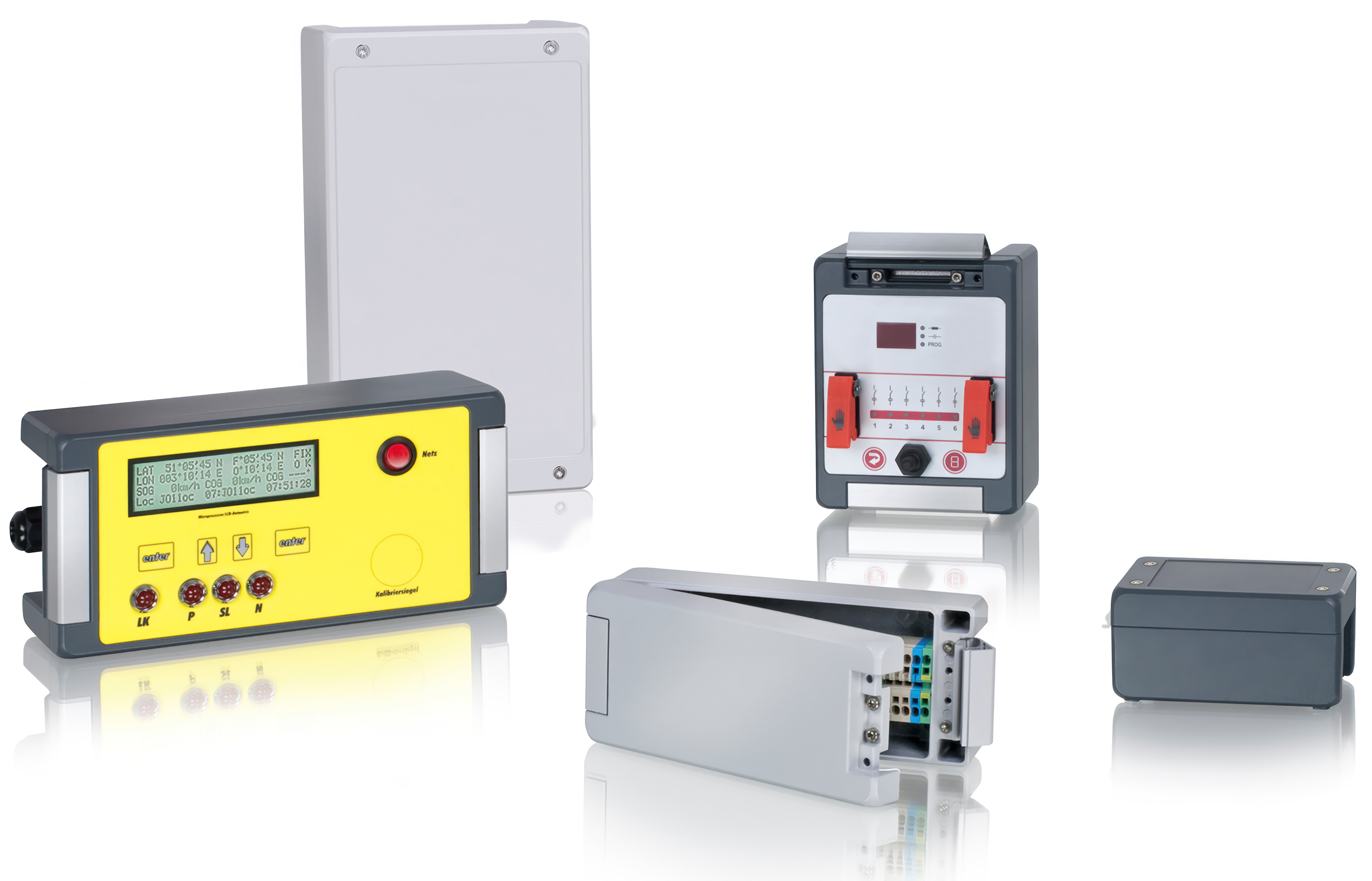
Aluminium enclosures

=== Foundation and IPO ===
The company was founded in 1975 under the name Phoenix Maschinentechnik AG and initially mainly produced and distributed technical gases for the welding industry. Through its work with gases, the company began to develop welding torches, which then became the main activity. In 1976, the company began developing enclosures for electronic devices. That same year, the company acquired its strongest competitor, Hartmann.

In 1986, the company name was changed to Phoenix Mecano AG.

The company went public in 1988. At that time, Phoenix Mecano was primarily active in the manufacture of enclosure technology, mechanical, and electromechanical components.

=== Expansion of business activities ===
In the years following its IPO, the company shifted focus to secondary products that were not considered strategic by developers, engineers, and mechanical designers. This positioned Phoenix Mecano as an outsourcing partner. The company also began serving markets outside mechanical engineering and industrial electronics. The business expanded into lifestyle and furniture, medical technology, oil and gas, and solar technology. In 1996, Phoenix Mecano entered the Chinese market and, in 1998, acquired a production facility in Tunisia.

During the 2000s, acquisitions were made in Italy and France, expanding the enclosure technology business segment. In 2014, the company acquired Redur to expand the operations into instrument transformers and current transformers.

=== Newer developments ===
On 1 January 2021, the DewertOkin Technology Group was established as a separate business division with a potential partial IPO in China considered. As a result, Phoenix Mecano restructured its business segments into three divisions in 2021: Enclosure Systems, Industrial Components, and DewertOkin Technology Group. In 2022, business activities were restructured with the sale of all shares in Phoenix Mecano Digital Elektronik GmbH and Phoenix Mecano Digital Tunisie to Swiss company Cicor.

In 2023, Phoenix Mecano divested its Rugged Computing business unit to the Kontron Group.

Also in 2023, after a five-year construction period, Phoenix Mecano opened a new industrial park in China on a 15-hectare site. This facility became the new headquarters for the DewertOkin Technology Group division, replacing five previous production sites. Phoenix Mecano invested nearly CHF100 million in the industrial park.

== Company structure ==
Phoenix Mecano AG, based in Stein am Rhein, is part of the Phoenix-Mecano Group. The Group generated sales of €757.3 million in the 2025 financial year. Phoenix Mecano has been listed on the Swiss stock exchange since 1988. The founding family Goldkamp holds a 34.6% stake.

The group operates internationally, with its primary production sites and development centres located in Germany, Hungary, Tunisia, India, and China.

== Products and field of activity ==
The Phoenix Mecano Group is divided into three divisions: Enclosure Systems, Industrial Components, and the DewertOkin Technology Group. The Enclosure Systems division includes industrial and electronic enclosures that are used across various industrial sectors, with explosion-proof enclosures deployed in areas with explosive atmospheres. The Industrial Components division offers components and systems for modular automation and industrial digitalisation, including software development for digitalisation of production processes. The DewertOkin Technology Group, headquartered in Jiaxing, Zhejiang, China, manufactures drive, system, and fitting technology for electrically adjustable comfort and care furniture. The company operates production facilities in Europe, North America, and Asia.

== Sustainability ==
Since 2022, Phoenix Mecano has published an annual sustainability report documenting the group’s initiatives. The group aims to fully eliminate CO_{2} emissions by 2050.
