= Zoltán Balog (bishop) =

Hungarian politician

Zoltán Balog MP
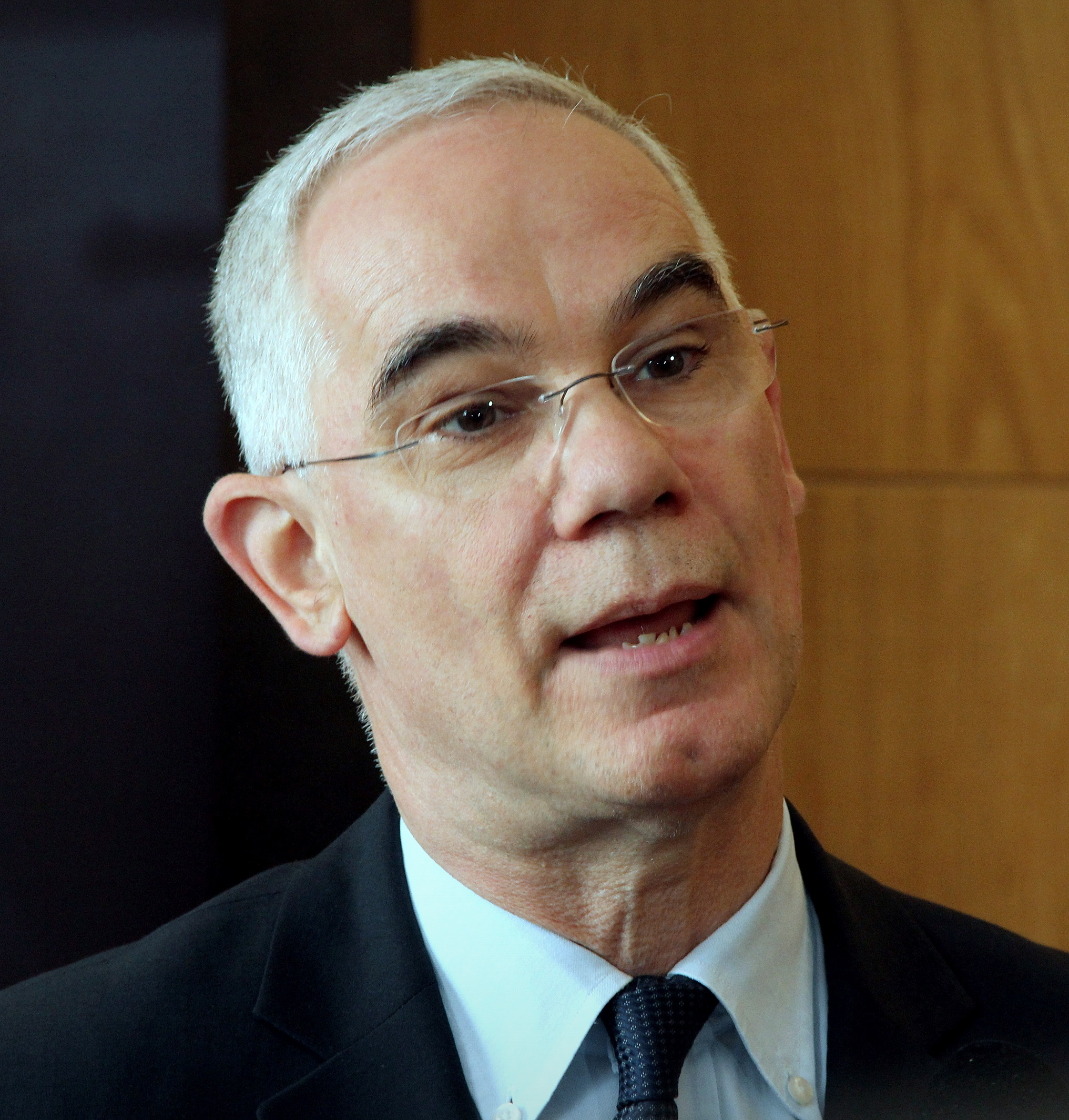

Minister of Human Resources
- In office 14 May 2012 – 18 May 2018
- Prime Minister: Viktor Orbán
- Preceded by: Miklós Réthelyi (National Resources)
- Succeeded by: Miklós Kásler

Member of the National Assembly
- In office 16 May 2006 – 17 October 2018

Personal details
- Born: 7 January 1958 (age 68) Ózd, Hungary
- Spouse: Judit Révész
- Children: Anna; Veronika; Eleonóra; Réka; Ádám
- Education: University of Berlin; University of Halle
- Profession: Calvinist bishop

Zoltán Balog (born 7 January 1958) is a Hungarian Reformed bishop and former politician who served as Hungary's Minister of Human Resources from 2012 to 2018. He is the bishop of the Dunamellék diocese of the Hungarian Reformed Church since 25 January 2021. He served as president of the synod of the Hungarian Reformed Church from 17 February 2021 until his resignation in the wake of a political scandal on 16 February 2024.

== Studies and pastoral activity ==
Zoltán Balog was born in Ózd on 7 January 1958. He was a volunteer in the post-WW2 renovation works of church buildings in Wittenberg, Goppeln and Dresden. He was an extramural student of Protestant theology at the Humboldt University in East Berlin in 1980. He finished his secondary studies at the Calvinist College of Debrecen in 1976. He worked as mechanical worker and turner for the Diósgyőr Machine Factory (DIGÉP) between 1976 and 1977. He was a caretaker at the Catholic Social Home of Hosszúhetény from 1979 to 1980. He started his theology studies at the Debrecen Reformed Theological University. He spent four semesters at the Martin Luther University of Halle-Wittenberg from 1981 to 1983. He graduated as a Calvinist pastor in the Budapest Reformed Theological Academy in 1983.

He served as a pastor in Maglód and five surrounding villages between 1983 and 1987. Thereafter, he spent two years as a postgraduate student in the University of Tübingen. He worked as a consultant for the Conference of European Churches (CEC). He was a pastor for East German refugees in Csillebérc pioneering camp in September 1989. He was a lecturer at the Budapest Reformed Theological University between 1989 and 1991. He taught divinity at the Deutsche Schule Budapest from 1991 to 1996 and the Baár–Madas Calvinist College from 1992 to 1993. He was a scientific associate for the Ecumenical Institute of the University of Bonn between 1993 and 1996. He was elected pastor of the German-speaking Protestant Congregation in Budapest in 1996, holding the position until 2006. He is a curator of the fund of the Bethesda Children Hospital since 2000.

== Political career ==
He was a member of the National Assembly (MP) from 2006 to 2018 for the national-conservative Fidesz party, serving as chair of the Parliamentary Committee on Human Rights, Minority, Civic and Religious Affairs between 2006 and 2010.

Between 2 June 2010 and 13 May 2012, he was State Secretary for Social Inclusion within the Ministry of National Resources. On 3 May 2012, the then-minister for National Resources, Miklós Réthelyi, resigned. Prime Minister Viktor Orbán appointed Balog to succeed Réthelyi and renamed the ministry to Ministry of Human Resources. The Balog ministry established the Klebelsberg Institution Maintenance Center (KLIK) on 1 September 2012. As a new central state agency for managing schools, KLIK’s creation further centralized Hungary's educational system.

Some months before the 2017 Hungarian presidential election, in December 2016, the opposition ATV channel claimed that Balog had been selected by Orbán and the Fidesz party leadership to succeed János Áder as president of Hungary, even though Áder was eligible for reelection. Balog refused to comment on press reports. In contrast to ATV, the Fidesz-backed Origo reported three days later that Áder would remain president despite "serious candidates" like Balog and Barnabás Lenkovics, a former president of the Constitutional Court. The news portal added that only Áder, who had asked for time to consider his candidacy, would come to a decision about his reelection. ATV questioned whether it was appropriate for Fidesz to support Balog in a Catholic-majority country given his Reformed background, as both Orbán and speaker of the National Assembly László Kövér are also Reformed. Fidesz's leadership was also reportedly aware of this concern. Though the party expected to benefit politically from a Balog presidency, it acknowledged Áder had not caused "big trouble" during his first term and "did not represent a significant political risk" to Orbán. On 5 January 2017, it was reported that several Fidesz leaders, primarily Kövér and Gergely Gulyás, had convinced Orbán at a meeting in Dobogókő to reelect Áder after all.

On 23 April 2018, Balog announced he would step down as minister of Human Resources, reportedly over disagreements with Orbán about the "superministry" system. Balog was appointed managing director of Fidesz's Foundation for a Civic Hungary. Balog also resigned from his parliamentary seat on 12 September 2018, which took effect on 17 October 2018. Retiring from politics, he continued his pastoral career in the Reformed Church. Gyula Budai took his seat in the National Assembly.

== Episcopacy ==
On November 5, 2020, Zoltán Balog was elected bishop of the Dunamellék diocese of the Hungarian Reformed Church. At his inauguration on January 25, 2021, he officially took over the episcopal office from his predecessor, István Szabó, who led the diocese for 18 years. He called the strengthening of communities his most urgent task after his swearing-in. He distinguished the difference between his former ministerial service and the forthcoming episcopal service as follows:

"In the Church, we don’t like to silence or repackage what we have recognized as truth in the name of some kind of political correctness. True to the Reformation and biblical heritage, the greatest possible sincerity is required."

The subsequent episcopal ordination took place on 24 May 2021 in Nagykőrös, Pest County.

He was elected pastoral president by the Synod of the Hungarian Reformed Church on 17 February 2021.

=== Pardon affair and resignation ===
In February 2024, Balog became implicated in the "pardon affair" (Hungarian: kegyelmi ügy) that led to his former mentee Katalin Novák's resignation as president of Hungary. Balog had allegedly pressured Novák to grant a presidential pardon to Endre Kónya, who hails from a prominent Reformed family and had been convicted of covering up child molestation at an orphanage in Bicske. Balog initially denied the allegations. On 13 February 2024, he admitted he had "supported" the pardon, but said he would not resign. An informal advisory council convoked to address the matter affirmed Balog's leadership of the Reformed Church by secret ballot on the same day, although it asked him "to weigh the extent to which his taking a role in public life is compatible with the synodal presidency." Facing growing political pressure from Fidesz and from within the church, however, he resigned from the synodal presidency on 16 February 2024. He remained bishop.

== Personal life ==
Balog is married, has five children and 8 grandchildren. He divorced his first wife in 1989. His wife is Judit Révész, an assistant professor with whom he has lived since 1990. Of her five children, four are girls: Anna, Veronika, Eleonóra and Réka, and he has a son, Ádám.

Political offices
Preceded by Miklós Réthelyi	Minister of Human Resources; 2012–2018	Succeeded by Miklós Kásler
