= Éva Fahidi =

Hungarian author (1925–2023)

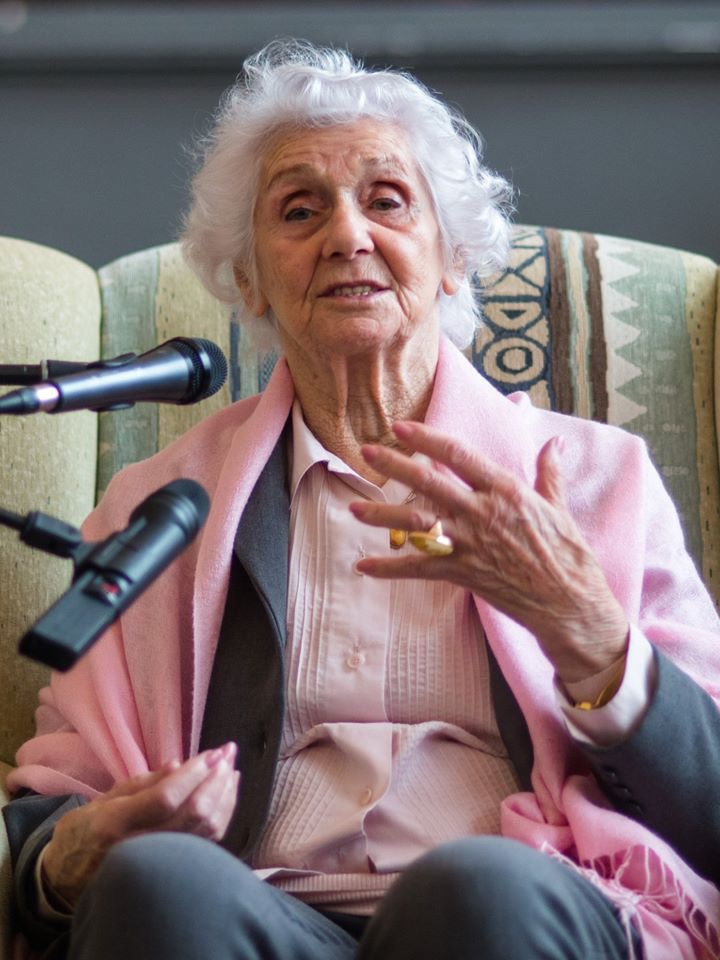
- Fahidi in 2019
- Born: 22 October 1925; Debrecen, Hungary
- Died: 11 September 2023 (aged 97); Budapest, Hungary
- Other name: Éva Pusztai-Fahidi
- Known for: Holocaust survivor

Éva Pusztai-Fahidi (22 October 1925 – 11 September 2023) was a Hungarian author and Holocaust survivor. She and her family were deported to the Auschwitz-Birkenau concentration camp in 1944.

== Early life ==
Éva Fahidi was born on 22 October 1925 in Debrecen and grew up in an upper-class Hungarian-Jewish family. In 1936, her family converted to Catholicism. On 29 April 1944, the Hungarian gendarmerie, who worked together with the Eichmann commando, arrested her, her parents Irma and Dezső Fahidi, and her eleven years old sister Gilike, and locked the family with other Jews in the city in a newly built ghetto that served as a prison.

On 14 May 1944, they were deported to the Auschwitz-Birkenau concentration camp where her mother and sister were selected to die in the gas chambers by SS doctor Josef Mengele. Her father died from inhuman prison conditions. After six weeks, she was transferred to the Münchmühle satellite camp belonging to the Buchenwald concentration camp, where she had to work for 12 hours a day for the Allendorf and Herrenwald explosives plants. At the end of the war, she was able to escape during a death march.

== After the Nazis ==
After months of wandering as a displaced person, Fahidi returned to Debrecen on 4 November 1945. Other people had taken over her parents' house and refused her entry. In the People's Republic of Hungary, Fahidi conformed to the expectations of the regime and did not speak publicly about her experiences during the Nazi era. She joined the Hungarian communists and hoped for a better society. She worked as an industrial employee and thanks to her knowledge of French, rose to become the external representative of the Hungarian steel combine. She avoided encounters with Germans and never wanted to speak the language of the perpetrators again, but continued to read works by German authors.

== Witness to the Shoah ==
The administration of Stadtallendorf, formerly Allendorf, published an advertisement in Hungarian newspapers, looking for former prisoners of the Münchmühle satellite camp in 1989. Fahidi was persuaded to go to Germany as a translator, and in October 1990 she took part in a week-long meeting in Stadtallendorf, where local representatives asked the former prisoners for forgiveness. Thereafter she visited the site regularly, giving lectures and interviews, questioning other contemporary witnesses, and guiding school classes through the memorial. Among other things, items of clothing she and her sister owned from their time in prison are exhibited there.

In July 2003, on the exact anniversary of her arrival in 1944, she also visited the memorials of the Auschwitz death camp. She later spoke regularly to groups in the youth meeting center in Oświęcim. According to her statement, telling the horrors she experienced there and which she had kept silent about until 2003 became a form of trauma processing: "It's really a release for me that I can now talk about it as much as I can want… Otherwise I would go insane." Thereafter she wrote down her memories. The book Anima rerum was first published in 2004 in a German translation and reprinted in 2011.

In 2011, Fahidi agreed to testify as a co-plaintiff in the criminal trials against the former concentration camp guards Hans Lipschis and Johann Breyer. In 1944, both, while in a Sturmbann (roughly "assault group"), had been involved in the murder of Hungarian Jews by the SS-Totenkopf units in Auschwitz-Birkenau, possibly also in the selection of the Fahidi family. According to her own statement, it was not about punishing the perpetrators, but about publicly witnessing their story.

Fahidi was a joint plaintiff in the trial against Oskar Gröning in 2015 and took part in the trial. That same year, she appeared in a dance theatre play about her life called "Sea Lavender".

The German Resistance Memorial Center dedicated an exhibition to Fahidi in 2019, the opening of which she performed at. As one of the last survivors of the Shoah, she expressed the hope that the memory of it would be effectively kept alive after her death through books, documents and places of remembrance: "It must not and cannot happen again." The Holocaust was a terrible shock to humanity. This may only become fully clear after the death of the last witness. The time after that could usher in a new kind of culture of remembrance. She hopes that everyone will then realize "that they have to get involved".

On 11 April 2020, the city of Weimar made Éva Fahidi-Pusztai an honorary citizen.

Éva Fahidi died in Budapest on 11 September 2023, at the age of 97.
