= List of historical capitals of Hungary =

Location of historical capitals of Hungary

Throughout its history, the European country of Hungary, changed the location of its capital city several times.

== Middle Ages ==
- Esztergom, from 1000 to 1256 (it was also one of the centers of the Principality of Hungary, probably from the reigns of Grand Prince Taksony or Géza)
- Székesfehérvár, it often changed the capital title with Esztergom (one of the centers of the Principality of Hungary until Stephen's crowning. Royal seats, crowning, burials, and Hungarian Diets took place from 1000 to 1543)
- Buda, from 1256 to 1315, from 1408 to 1485 and from 1490 to 1536 (1541) (Note: Pressburg became the capital of Habsburg Hungary (Royal Hungary) in 1536, however the Queen, the infant counter-king John II and George Martinuzzi secured Buda until the Ottoman annexation (1541))
- Temesvár (present-day Timișoara), 1315–1323
- Visegrád, from 1323 to 1408
- Bécs (Vienna), from 1485 to 1490, when Matthias Corvinus occupied Lower Austria and put his seat to Bécs (Vienna)

== Modern era ==
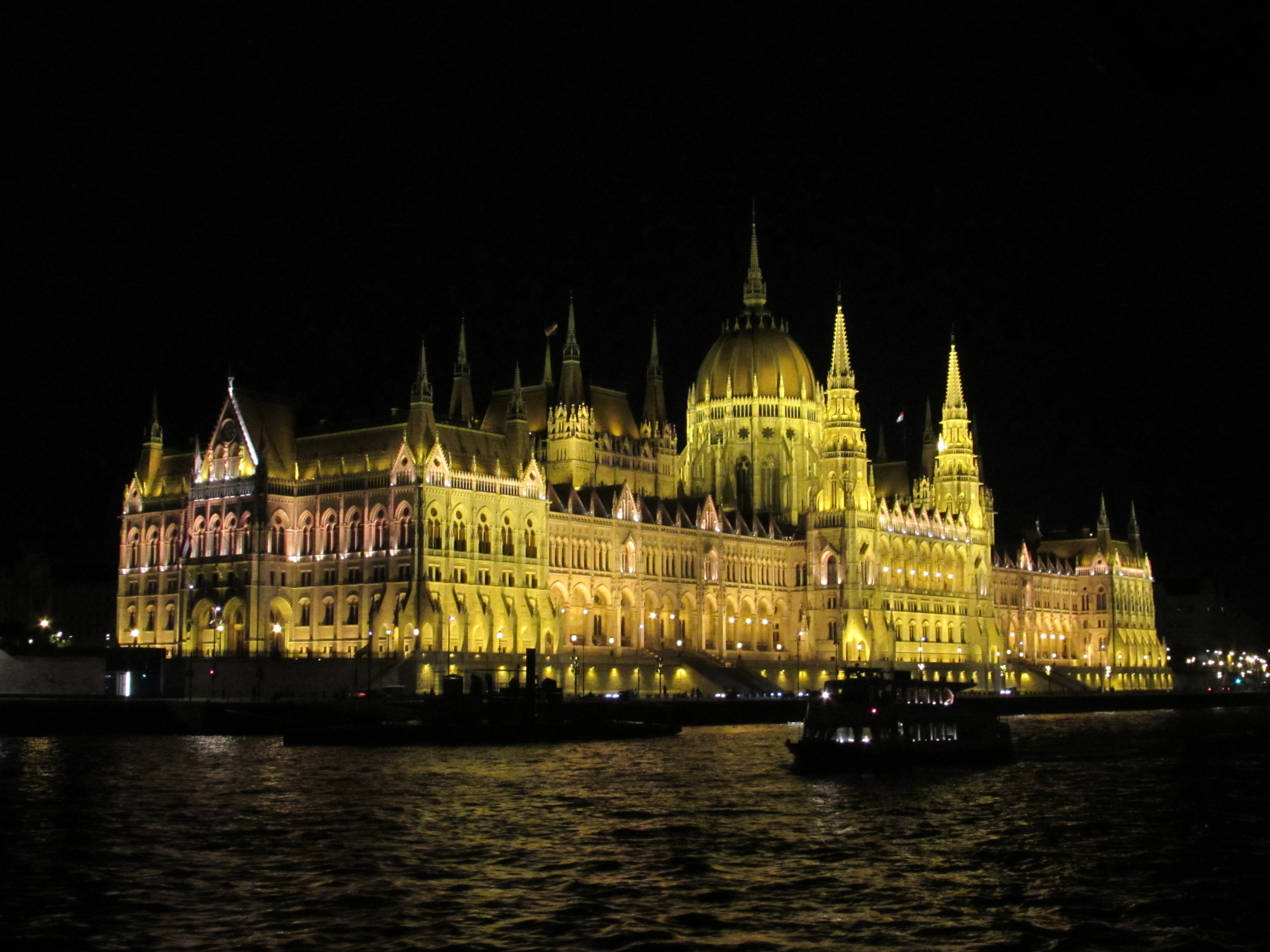
Hungarian Parliament Building, Budapest

- Pressburg/Pozsony (present-day Bratislava) from 1536 to 1783 (during Ottoman occupation)
- Lippa (present-day Lipova), from 1541 to 1542, capital of the Eastern Hungarian Kingdom for a short time
- Gyulafehérvár (present-day Alba Iulia), from 1542 to 1570, royal residence and the capital of the Eastern Hungarian Kingdom (it was also the centre of the latter Principality of Transylvania)
- Buda, from 1783 to 1873
- Debrecen, in 1849 and in 1944 (during the Hungarian Revolution of 1848 and at the end of World War II)
- Budapest (including Buda), 1873–present

== Capitals of Pannonia province ==
Note that the Roman provinces on the territory of today's Hungary, notably Pannonia, had other capitals. Capitals of Roman (Lower) Pannonia, located in the territory of present-day Hungary, were: Aquincum (today Óbuda), Savaria (today Szombathely) and Sopianae (today Pécs).
