= Debrecen =

Second-largest city of Hungary

- City with county rights
- Debrecen Megyei Jogú Város
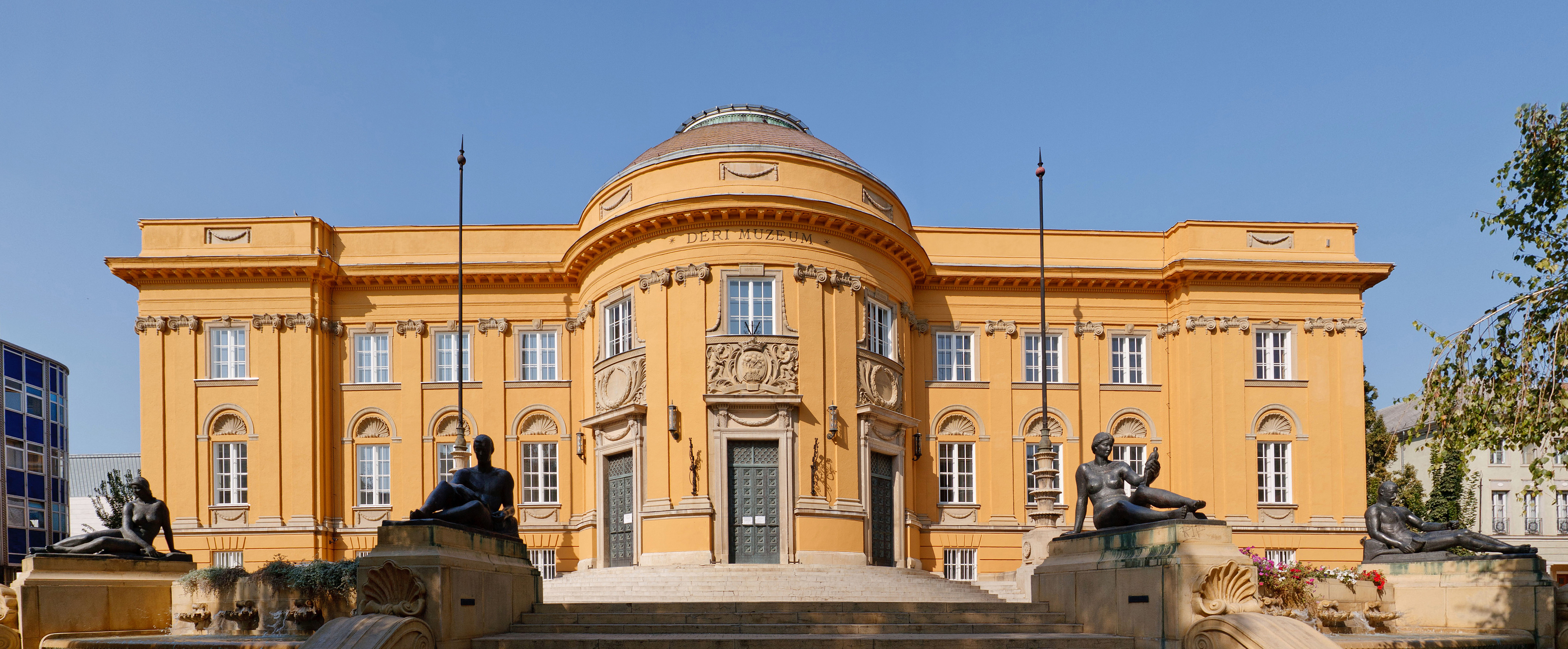
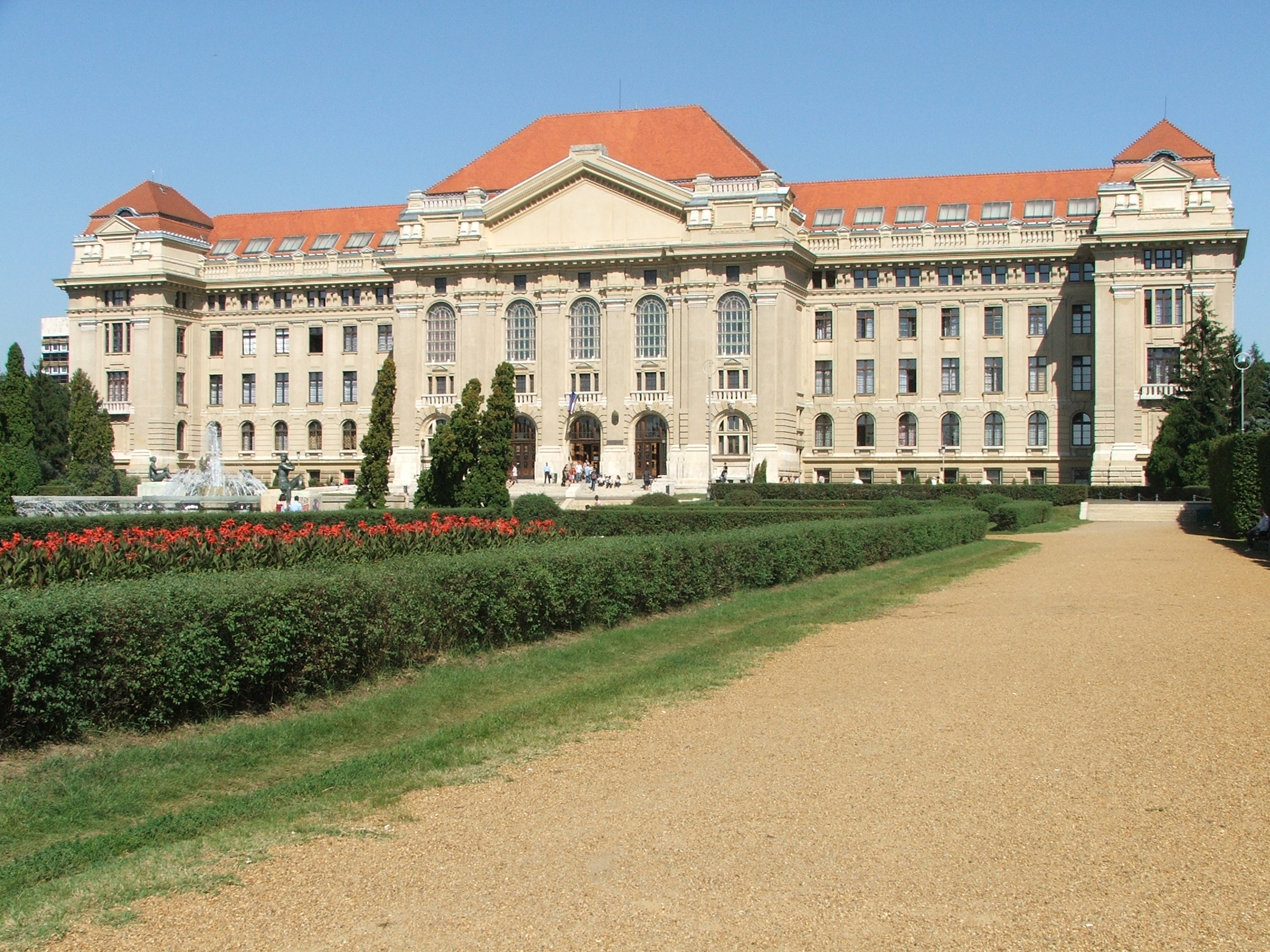
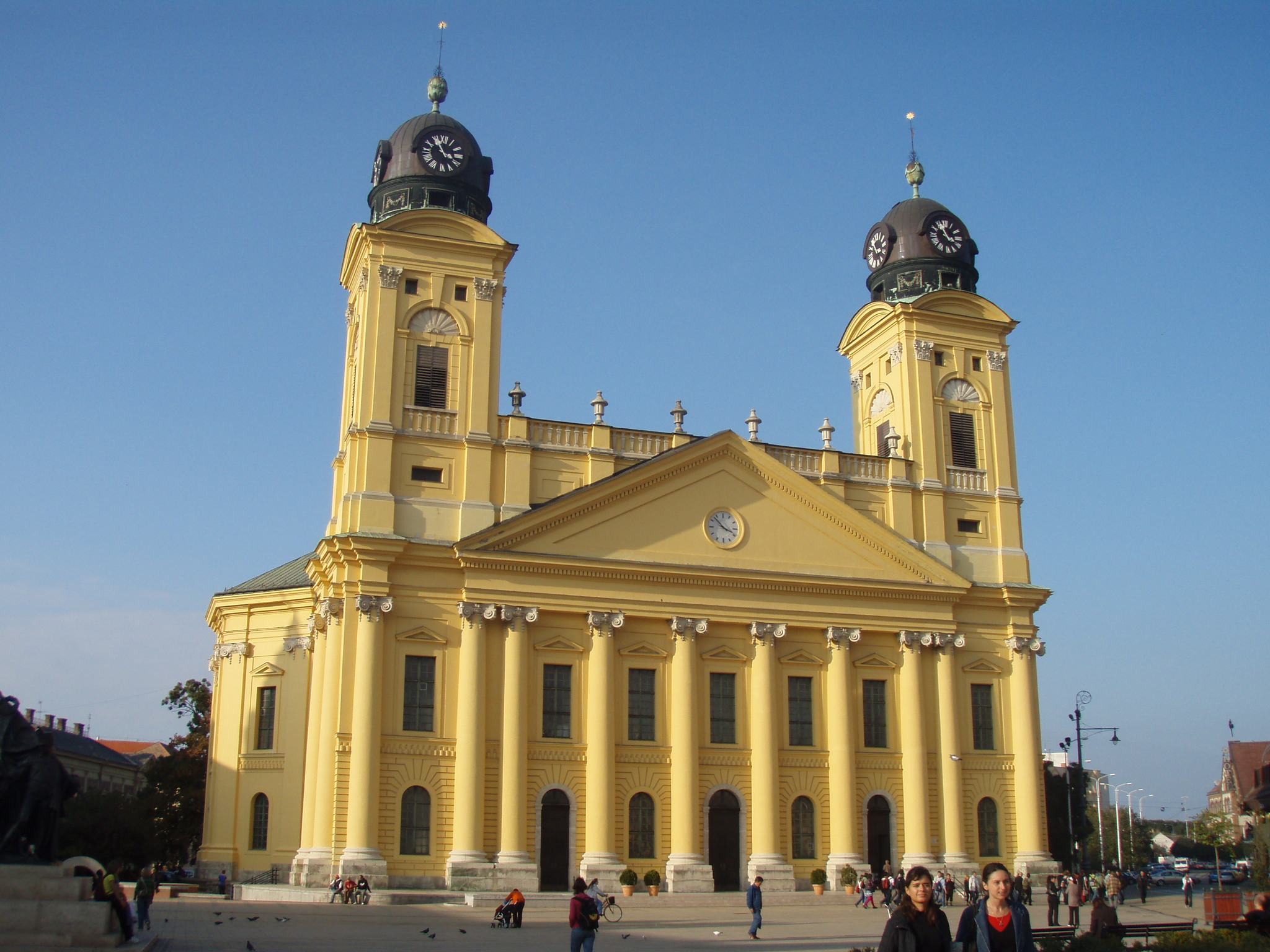
- Descending, from top: Déri Museum, University of Debrecen, and Protestant Great Church

- Flag Coat of arms
- Nicknames: The Calvinist Rome, Cívis City
- Location within Hajdú-Bihar County Location within Hungary
- Coordinates: 47°31′54″N 21°37′28″E
- Country: Hungary
- Region: Northern Great Plain
- County: Hajdú-Bihar
- District: Debrecen
- Established: 9th century AD
- City status: 1218

Government
  - Mayor: László Papp (Fidesz)
  - Town Notary: Dr Antal Szekeres

Area
  - City with county rights: 461.25 km^{2} (178.09 sq mi)
  - Rank: 3rd in Hungary
- Elevation: 121 m (397 ft)
- Highest elevation: 151 m (495 ft)

Population (2019)
  - City with county rights: 202,402 ▲
  - Rank: 2nd in Hungary
  - Density: 442.09/km^{2} (1,145.0/sq mi)
  - Urban: 328,642 (2nd)
- Demonym(s): debreceni, cívis

Population by ethnicity
  - Hungarians: 84.8%
  - Romani: 0.6%
  - Germans: 0.6%
  - Romanians: 0.3%
  - Other: 2.0%

Population by religion
  - Calvinist: 24.8%
  - Roman Catholic: 11.1%
  - Greek Catholic: 5.1%
  - Lutheran: 0.4%
  - Jews: 0.1%
  - Other: 2.3%
  - Non-religious: 27.8%
  - Unknown: 28.4%
- Time zone: UTC1 (CET)
  - Summer (DST): UTC+2 (CEST)
- Postal code: 4000 to 4032, 4063
- Area code: (+36) 52
- Motorways: M35 Motorway
- NUTS 3 code: HU321
- Distance from Budapest: 231 km (144 mi) West
- International airports: Debrecen (DEB)
- MPs: List: Lajos Kósa (Fidesz); László Pósán (Fidesz); László Tasó (Fidesz)
- Website: debrecen.hu/en

Debrecen (Note: Pronunciation: /ˈdɛbrətsɛn/ DEB-rət-sen; Hungarian: [ˈdɛbrɛt͡sɛn]; German: Debrezin [ˈdɛbʁɛt͡siːn]; Slovak: Debrecín [ˈɟɛbrɛt͡siːn]; Romanian: Debrețin) is Hungary's second-largest city, after Budapest, the regional centre of the Northern Great Plain region and the seat of Hajdú-Bihar County. A city with county rights, it was the largest Hungarian city in the 18th century and it is one of the Hungarian people's most important cultural centres. Debrecen was also the capital city of Hungary during the revolution in 1848–1849. During the revolution, the dethronement of the Habsburg dynasty was declared in the Reformed Great Church. The city also served as the capital of Hungary by the end of World War II in 1944–1945. It is home to the University of Debrecen.

== Etymology ==
There are at least three narratives of the origin of the city's name. The city is first documented in 1235 as Debrezun. One theory states that the name derives from the Turkic word debresin, which means 'live' or 'move'. Another theory says the name is of Slavic origin and means 'well-esteemed', from Slavic Dьbricinъ or from dobre zliem ("good land"). Thirdly and lastly, Professor Šimon Ondruš derived the toponym from the Proto-Slavic term *dьbrь (gorge).

The standard Romanian name for the city is Debrețin; however, Romanian communities in Hungary use the version Dobrițân.

== History ==
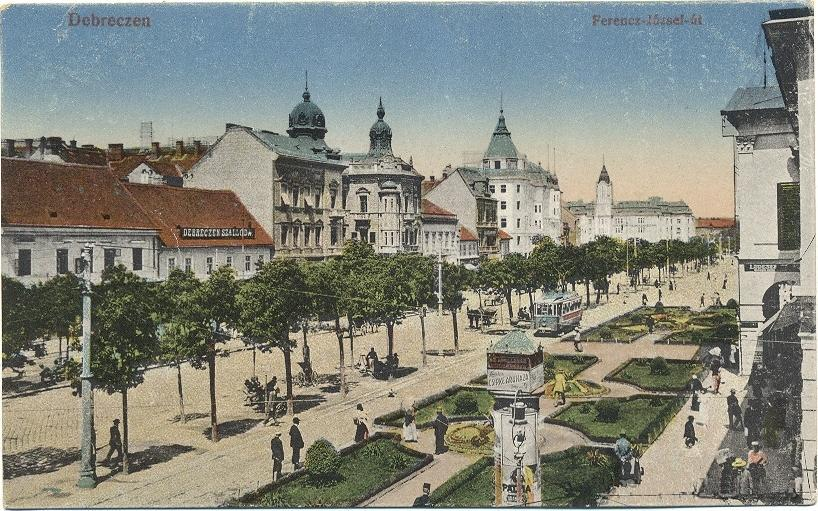
Piac Street in 1910s

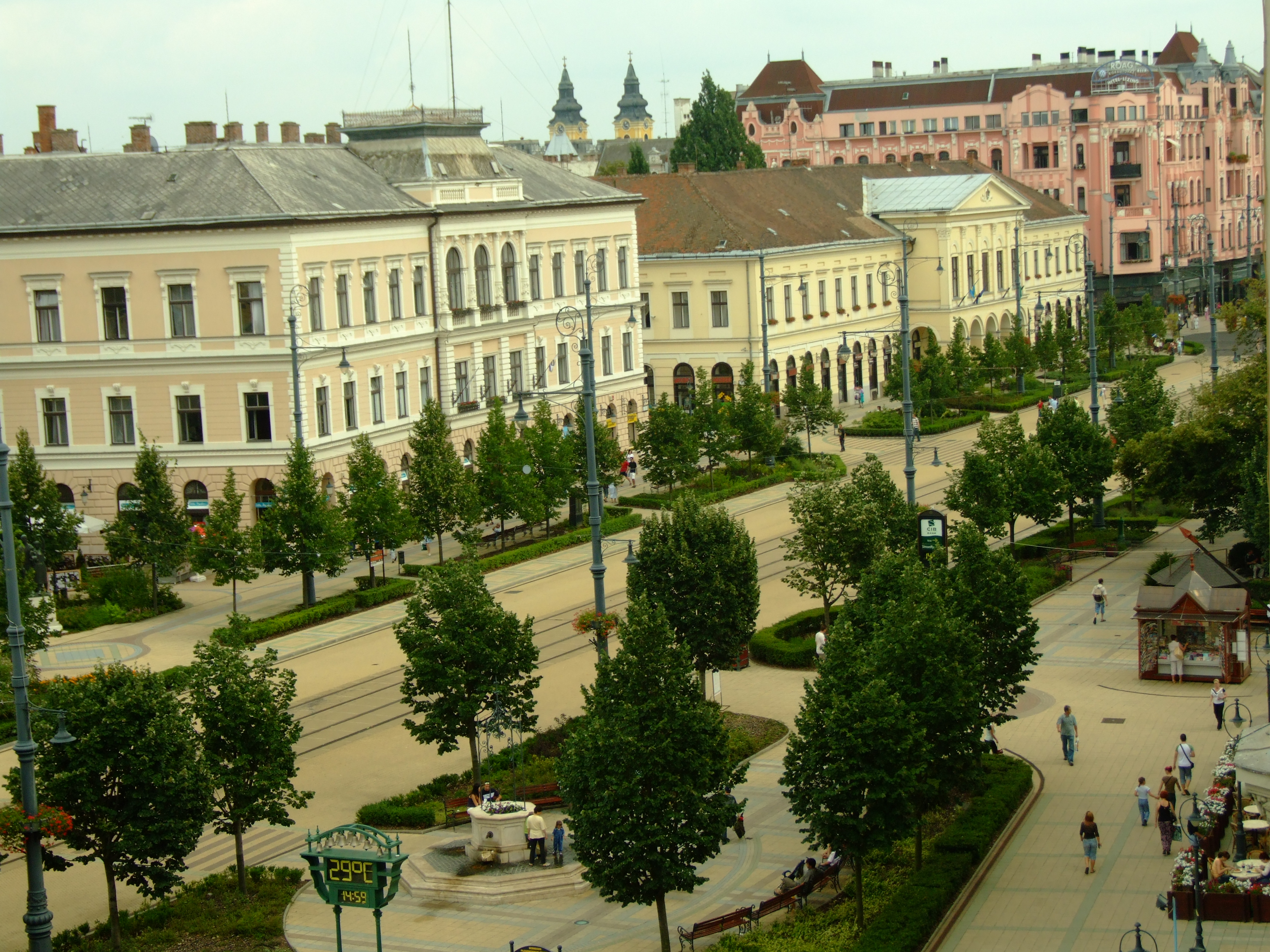
Downtown

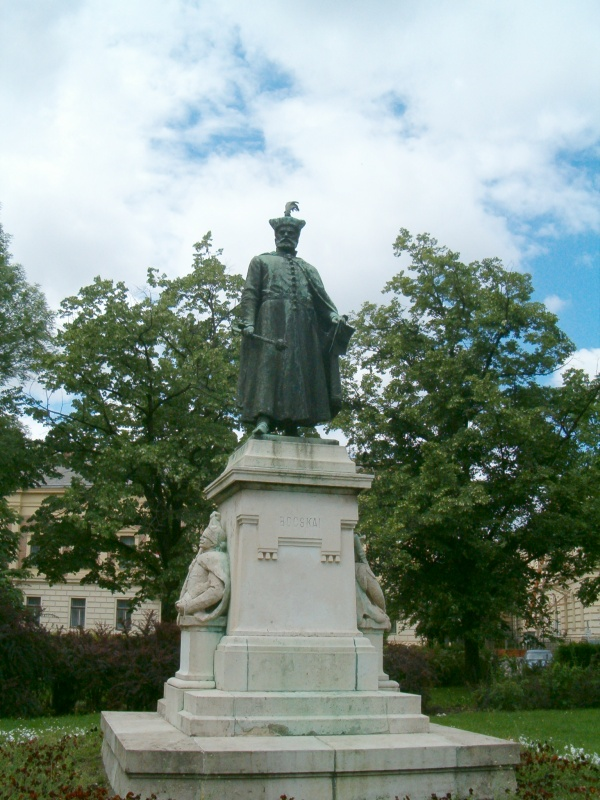
Stephen Bocskay was a Hungarian noble from Transylvania.

The settlement was established after the Hungarian conquest. Debrecen became more important after some of the small villages of the area (Boldogasszonyfalva, Szentlászlófalva) were deserted due to the Mongol invasion of Europe. It experienced rapid development after the middle of the 13th century.

In 1361, Louis I of Hungary granted the citizens of Debrecen the right to choose the town's judge and council. This provided some opportunities for self-government for the town. By the early 16th century, Debrecen was an important market town.

King Sigismund, Holy Roman Emperor, as part of a treaty with Serbian ruler Stefan Lazarević, gave him the opportunity to rule Debrecen in September 1411. A year after Lazarević's death in 1426, his role was taken over by his successor, Đurađ Branković. Between 1450 and 1507, it was a domain of the Hunyadi family.

During the Ottoman period, being close to the border and having no castle or city walls, Debrecen often found itself in difficult situations and the town was saved only by the diplomatic skills of its leaders. Sometimes the town was protected by the Ottoman Empire, sometimes by the Catholic European rulers or by Francis II Rákóczi, prince of Transylvania. Debrecen later embraced the Protestant Reformation quite early, earning the monikers of "the Calvinist Rome" and "the Geneva of Hungary". At this period the inhabitants of the town were mainly Hungarian Calvinists. Debrecen came under Ottoman control as a sanjak between 1558 and 1693 and orderly bounded to the eyalets of Budin (1541–1596), Eğri (1596–1660) and Varat (1660–1693) as "Debreçin".

In 1693, Leopold I, Holy Roman Emperor elevated Debrecen to free royal town status. In 1715, the Roman Catholic Church returned to Debrecen, and the town gave it a place to build a church, allowing the Piarist monks to build the St. Ann's Cathedral. By this time the town was an important cultural, commercial and agricultural centre, and many future scholars and poets attended its Protestant College (a predecessor of today's University of Debrecen and also of Debrecen Reformed Theological University).

In 1849, Debrecen was the capital of Hungary for a short time when the Hungarian revolutionary government fled there from Pest-Buda (modern-day Budapest). In April 1849, the dethronization of Habsburgs (neglected after the fall of the revolution) and the independence of Hungary was proclaimed here by Lajos Kossuth at the Great (Calvinist) Church (Nagytemplom in Hungarian.) The last battle of the war of independence was also close to Debrecen. The Russians, allied to Habsburgs, defeated the Hungarian army close to the western part of the town.

After the war, Debrecen slowly began to prosper again. In 1857, the railway line between Budapest and Debrecen was completed, and Debrecen soon became a railway junction. New schools, hospitals, churches, factories, and mills were built, banks and insurance companies settled in the city. The appearance of the city began to change too: with new, taller buildings, parks and villas, it no longer resembled a provincial town and began to look like a modern city. In 1884, Debrecen became the first Hungarian city to have a steam tramway.

After World War I, Hungary lost a considerable portion of its eastern territory to Romania, and Debrecen once again became situated close to the border of the country. It was occupied by the Romanian army for a short time in 1919. Tourism provided a way for the city to begin to prosper again. Many buildings (among them an indoor swimming pool and Hungary's first stadium) were built in the central park, the Nagyerdő ("Big Forest"), providing recreational facilities. The building of the university was completed. Hortobágy, a large pasture owned by the city, became a tourist attraction.

During World War II, Debrecen was almost completely destroyed. 70% of the buildings suffered damage and 50% of them were completely destroyed. A major battle involving combined arms, including several hundred tanks (Battle of Debrecen), occurred near the city in October 1944. Debrecen was captured by Soviet troops of the 2nd Ukrainian Front on 20 October. After 1944, the reconstruction began and Debrecen became the capital of Hungary for a short time once again. The citizens began to rebuild their city, trying to restore its pre-war status, but the new, Communist government of Hungary had other plans. The institutions and estates of the city were taken into public ownership, private property was taken away. This forced change of the old system brought new losses to Debrecen; half of its area was annexed to nearby towns, and the city also lost its rights over Hortobágy. In 1952, two new villages – Ebes and Nagyhegyes – were formed from former parts of Debrecen, while in 1981, the nearby village Józsa was annexed to the city.

== Demographics ==
Historical population
| Year | Pop. | ±% |
|---|---|---|
| 1870 | 45,132 | — |
| 1880 | 50,320 | +11.5% |
| 1890 | 56,246 | +11.8% |
| 1900 | 73,878 | +31.3% |
| 1910 | 90,764 | +22.9% |
| 1920 | 101,543 | +11.9% |
| 1930 | 116,013 | +14.3% |
| 1941 | 124,148 | +7.0% |
| 1949 | 115,399 | −7.0% |
| 1960 | 134,930 | +16.9% |
| 1970 | 167,860 | +24.4% |
| 1980 | 198,195 | +18.1% |
| 1990 | 212,235 | +7.1% |
| 2001 | 211,034 | −0.6% |
| 2011 | 211,320 | +0.1% |
| 2022 | 199,858 | −5.4% |
| 2026 | 202,331 | +1.2% |

=== Languages ===
According to the 2011 census, the total population of Debrecen were 211,320, of whom 209,782 people (99.3%) spoke Hungarian. 49,909 (23.6%) also knew English, 22,454 (10.6%) German, and 5,416 (2.6%) could speak Russian.

=== Ethnic groups ===
According to the 2011 census, there were 177,435 (84.0%) Hungarians, 1,305 (0.6%) Romani, 554 (0.3%) Germans and 504 (0.2%) Romanians in Debrecen. 31,931 people (15.1% of the total population) did not declare their ethnicity. Excluding these people Hungarians made up 98.9% of the total population. In Hungary people can declare more than one ethnicity, so the sum of ethnicities is higher than the total population.

Largest groups of foreign population
| Nationality | Population (2011) |
|---|---|
| Germany | 1,303 |
| Romania | 739 |
| Russia | 305 |
| Ukraine | 262 |
| Bulgaria | 166 |
| Slovakia | 126 |
| Armenia | 98 |
| China | 98 |

=== Religion ===
Religion in Debrecen (2022)
1. Calvinism (20.4%)
2. Roman Catholicism (9.00%)
3. Greek Catholicism (5.40%)
4. Evangelical Christianity (0.40%)
5. Other (2.80%)
6. Undeclared (39.0%)
7. Irreligion (23.0%)

According to the 2011 census, there were 52,459 (24.8%) Hungarian Reformed (Calvinist), 23,413 (11.1%) Roman Catholic, 10,762 (5.1%) Greek Catholic, 899 (0.4%) Baptist, 885 (0.4%) Jehovah's Witnesses, and 812 (0.4%) Lutheran in Debrecen. 54,909 people (26.0%) were irreligious, 3,877 (1.8%) atheist, while 59,955 people (28.4%) did not declare their religion.

==== Reformed Church in Debrecen ====
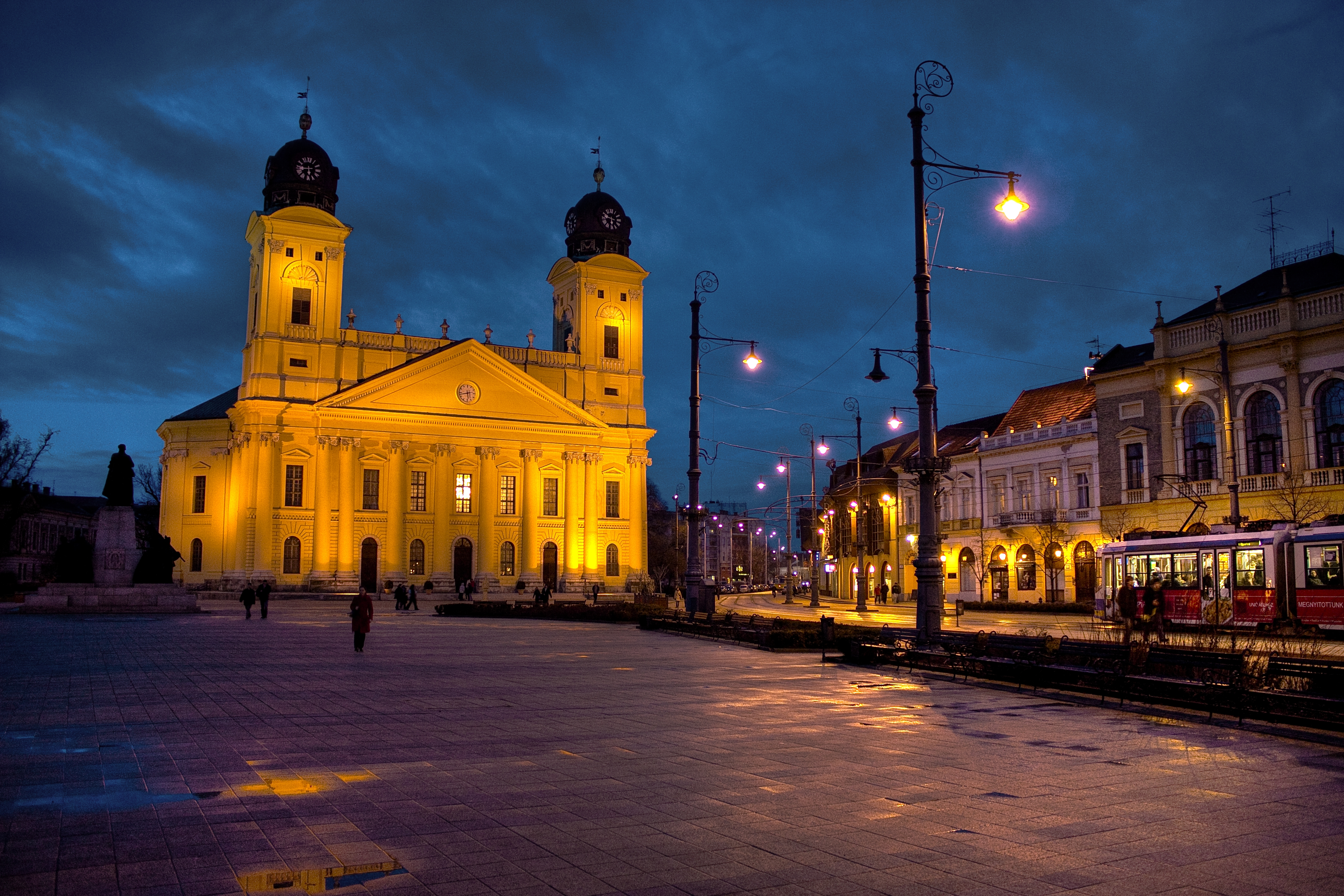
The Great Church

From the 16th century, the Reformation took roots in the city; first Lutheranism, then Calvin's teachings become predominant. From 1551, the Calvinist government of the city forbade Catholics from moving to Debrecen. Catholic churches were taken over by the Calvinist church. The Catholic faith vanished from the city until 1715 when it regained a church. Several Calvinist church leaders like Peter Melius Juhasz who translated the Genevan Psalms lived and worked here. In 1567, a synod was formed in the city when the Second Helvetic Confession was adopted. Famous Calvinist colleges and schools were formed. Nickname of Debrecen commonly used in Hungary is the Calvinist Rome or the Geneva of Hungary because of the great percentage of the Calvinist faith in the city as well as the Calvinist church has significant influence in the city and the region. Debrecen is also home to the Reformed Theological University of Debrecen (Debreceni Református Hittudományi Egyetem), founded in 1538 and was the only Calvinist theological institute in the country permitted to function during the communist rule.

The Hungarian Reformed Church has about 20 congregations in Debrecen, including the famous Reformed Great Church of Debrecen, which can easily accommodate about 5000 people (with 3000 seats).

==== Jewish community ====
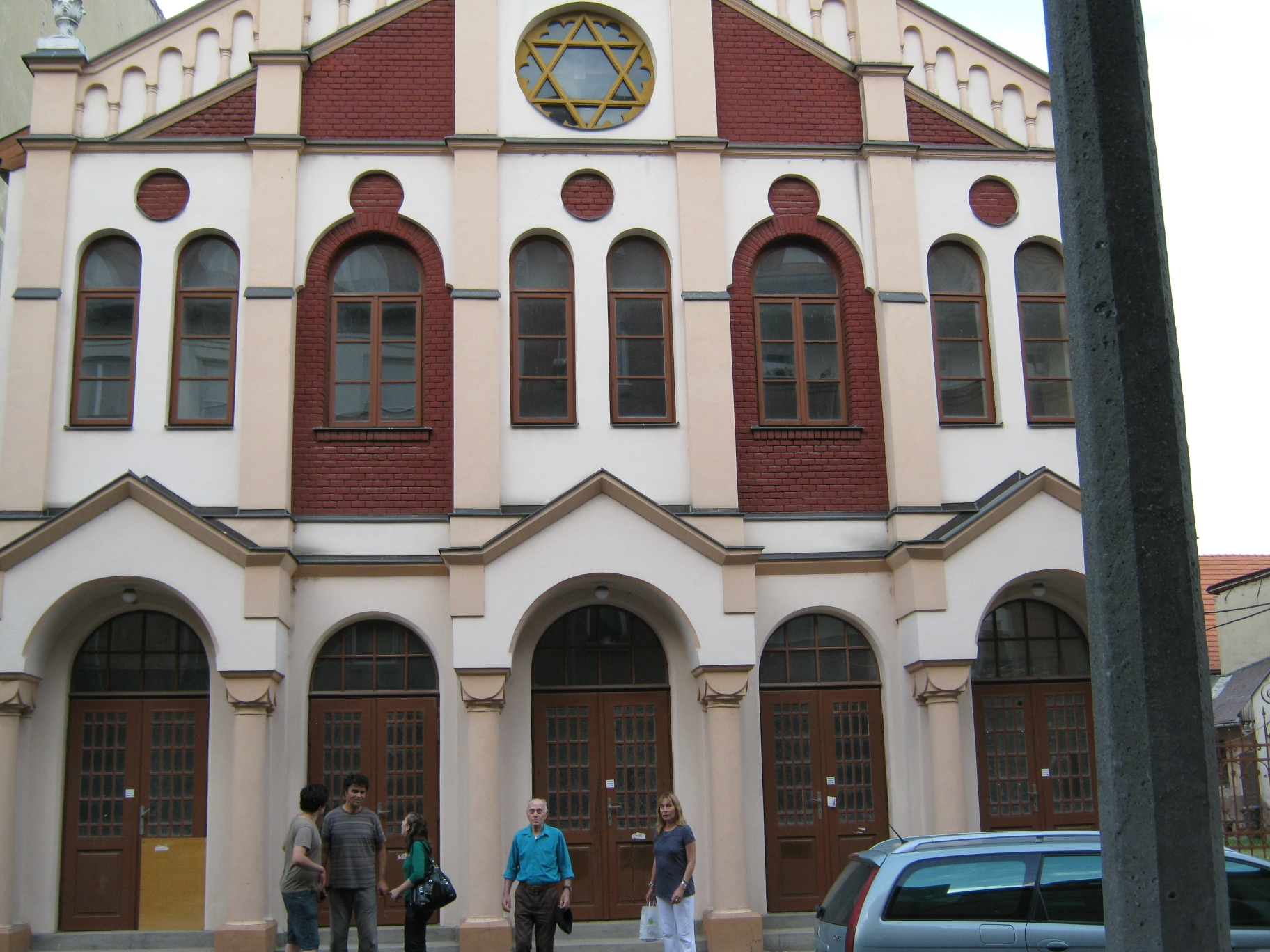
The main synagogue in the center of the city

Jews were first allowed to settle in Debrecen in 1814, with an initial population count of 118 men within 4 years. Twenty years later, they were allowed to purchase land and homes. By 1919, they comprised 10% of the population (with over 10,000 community members listed) and owned almost half of the large properties in and around the town.

The Hungarian antisemitic laws of 1938 caused many businesses to close, and in 1939 many Jews were enslaved and sent to Ukraine, where many died in minefields.

In 1940, the Germans estimated that 12,000 Jews were left in the town. In 1941, Jews of Galician and Polish origin were expelled, reducing the number of Jews to 9142. In 1942, more Jews were drafted into the Hungarian forced labor groups and sent to Ukraine.

German forces entered the city on 20 March 1944 (two and a half weeks before Passover), ordering a Judenrat (Jewish Council) headed by Rabbi Pal (Meir) Weisz, and a Jewish police squad was formed, headed by former army captain Bela Lusztbaum. On 30 March 1944 (a week before Passover), the Jews were ordered to wear the Yellow star of David. Jewish cars were confiscated and phone lines cut. During the Passover week, many Jewish dignitaries were taken to a nearby prison camp, eventually reaching the number of 300 prisoners. A week later all Jewish stores were closed, and a public book-burning of Jewish books was presided over by the antisemitic newspaper editor Mihaly Kalosvari Borska.

An order to erect a ghetto was issued on 28 April 1944, in the name of the town mayor Sandor Kolscey, who opposed the act, and was ousted by the Germans. Jews were forced to build the Ghetto walls, finishing it within less than a month on 15 May 1944.

On 7 June 1944, all movement in or out of the Ghetto was prohibited and a week later all Debrecen Jews were deported to the nearby Serly brickyards, and stripped of their belongings, joining Jews from other areas.

Ten families of prominent Jews, including those of Rabbi Weisz and orthodox chief Rabbi Strasser, along with the heads of the Zionist (non orthodox) movement joined the Kasztner train. (According to some sources, the Strasshoff camps were filled with Jews for negotiations in case the Germans could receive something for releasing these Jews, among them 6841 from Debrecen.) 298 of these Debrecen Jews were shot by the SS in Bavaria, after being told they would reach Theresienstadt. Some young Debrecen Jews escaped the town, led by the high school principal Adoniyahu Billitzer and reached Budapest, joining resistance movements and partisans.

Most of the remaining Debrecen Jews were deported to Auschwitz, reaching there on 3 July 1944. Debrecen was occupied by the Soviet Army on 20 October 1944. Some 4,000 Jews of Debrecen and its surroundings survived the war, creating a community of 4,640 in 1946 – the largest in the region. About 400 of those moved to Israel, and many others moved to the west by 1970, with 1,200 Jews left in the town, using two synagogues, one of them established before World War I.

== Climate ==
Debrecen, typically for its Central European location, has a humid continental climate (Köppen Dfb bordering on Dfa, Trewartha Dcbo bordering on Dcao). The annual average temperature is 11.0 °C (51.8 °F), the hottest month in July is 21.9 °C (71.4 °F), and the coldest month is −0.8 °C (30.6 °F) in January. The annual precipitation is 542.7 millimetres (21.37 in), of which July is the wettest with 67.7 millimetres (2.67 in), while January is the driest with only 24.3 millimetres (0.96 in).

Climate data for Debrecen, 1991−2020 normals, extremes 1901-present
| Month | Jan | Feb | Mar | Apr | May | Jun | Jul | Aug | Sep | Oct | Nov | Dec | Year |
|---|---|---|---|---|---|---|---|---|---|---|---|---|---|
| Record high °C (°F) | 17.1 (62.8) | 19.1 (66.4) | 26.4 (79.5) | 33.6 (92.5) | 33.4 (92.1) | 37.4 (99.3) | 38.7 (101.7) | 39.8 (103.6) | 36.4 (97.5) | 29.5 (85.1) | 25.5 (77.9) | 17.4 (63.3) | 39.8 (103.6) |
| Mean daily maximum °C (°F) | 2.3 (36.1) | 5.0 (41.0) | 10.9 (51.6) | 17.7 (63.9) | 22.5 (72.5) | 26.0 (78.8) | 27.8 (82.0) | 28.1 (82.6) | 22.6 (72.7) | 16.6 (61.9) | 9.8 (49.6) | 3.2 (37.8) | 16.0 (60.8) |
| Daily mean °C (°F) | −0.8 (30.6) | 0.9 (33.6) | 5.8 (42.4) | 11.9 (53.4) | 16.8 (62.2) | 20.3 (68.5) | 21.9 (71.4) | 21.8 (71.2) | 16.5 (61.7) | 11.0 (51.8) | 5.5 (41.9) | 0.4 (32.7) | 11.0 (51.8) |
| Mean daily minimum °C (°F) | −3.6 (25.5) | −2.7 (27.1) | 1.2 (34.2) | 6.1 (43.0) | 10.8 (51.4) | 14.6 (58.3) | 16.0 (60.8) | 15.7 (60.3) | 11.2 (52.2) | 6.2 (43.2) | 2.1 (35.8) | −2.2 (28.0) | 6.3 (43.3) |
| Record low °C (°F) | −30.2 (−22.4) | −26.0 (−14.8) | −17.8 (0.0) | −7.1 (19.2) | −3.0 (26.6) | −0.4 (31.3) | 5.2 (41.4) | 2.7 (36.9) | −2.9 (26.8) | −14.9 (5.2) | −19.0 (−2.2) | −28.0 (−18.4) | −30.2 (−22.4) |
| Average precipitation mm (inches) | 24.3 (0.96) | 32.2 (1.27) | 30.0 (1.18) | 45.1 (1.78) | 59.3 (2.33) | 66.8 (2.63) | 67.7 (2.67) | 46.4 (1.83) | 47.3 (1.86) | 41.1 (1.62) | 40.5 (1.59) | 42.0 (1.65) | 542.7 (21.37) |
| Average precipitation days (≥ 1.0 mm) | 6.1 | 6.6 | 6.1 | 6.8 | 8.4 | 8.2 | 7.6 | 6.0 | 6.6 | 6.2 | 6.9 | 7.1 | 82.6 |
| Average relative humidity (%) | 84.4 | 78.8 | 68.6 | 62.2 | 65.1 | 66.5 | 65.9 | 64.2 | 69.7 | 77.0 | 83.7 | 85.5 | 72.6 |
| Mean monthly sunshine hours | 57.6 | 85.0 | 146.8 | 190.3 | 251.4 | 266.4 | 295.3 | 274.3 | 201.7 | 155.1 | 72.2 | 47.0 | 2,043.1 |
Source 1: HMS
Source 2: Ogimet(June record high), NOAA

== Culture ==
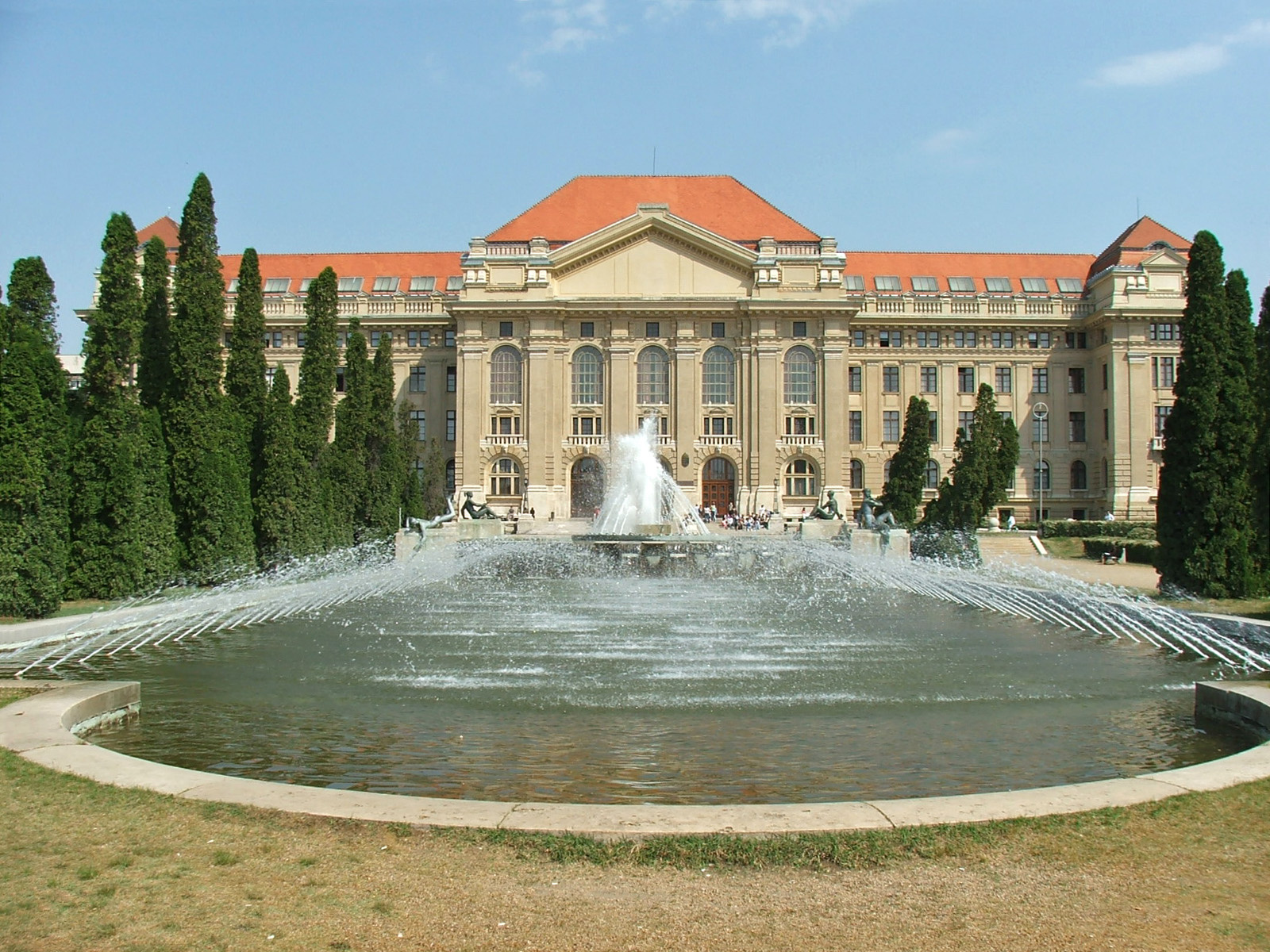
The main building of the University of Debrecen

Mainly thanks to the Reformation and the prestigious Reformed College of Debrecen, founded in 1538, Debrecen has been the intellectual and cultural centre of the surrounding area since the 16th century. The College formed into a full-scale university in 1912, and its intellectual life developed a sphere of influence between Eger and Nagyvárad (now Oradea in Romania). In 1949–1950, several departments of the university were shut down, due to Communist takeover, with many students and teachers being expelled. During the decades of the socialist regime, Debrecen had three separate universities: the Kossuth Lajos University of Sciences (KLTE) was the bearer of the College's traditions with its arts and natural science faculties; the Medical University of Debrecen (DOTE) was the main medical school of Eastern Hungary; and the Debrecen University of Agriculture (DATE) was one of the two major agricultural universities of the country besides Gödöllő. The three entities formed the current University of Debrecen in 2000, with several new faculties being formed since the 1990s from the Faculty of Law to the newest addition of the Faculty of Informatics. Its main building, which now almost unanimously belongs to the Faculty of Arts, is still widely recognized work of architecture (mostly thanks to its main building). The university is the largest university in Hungary, has more than 100 departments and is a major research facility in Europe. The university is well known for the cactus research laboratory in the botanic gardens behind the main building.

In the second half of the 19th century, the Debrecen press attracted several notable figures to the city. Endre Ady, Gyula Krúdy, and Árpád Tóth all began their journalistic careers in Debrecen. Prominent literary figures from the city have included Magda Szabó, and Gábor Oláh. One of Hungary's best known poets, Mihály Csokonai, was born and lived in the city. The city's theatre, built in 1865, was named in his honour in 1916, but can trace its roots back to the National Theatre Company founded in Debrecen in 1789, which at first gave performances in the carthouse of an inn. Celebrated actress Lujza Blaha is among those to have performed there.

Debrecen is home to Tankcsapda, one of Hungary's most successful rock bands. There is also a rock school in the city which offers training and mentoring to young musicians. Classic media in the city include the newspaper Napló, two TV channels, a range of local radio stations and several companies and associations producing media material.

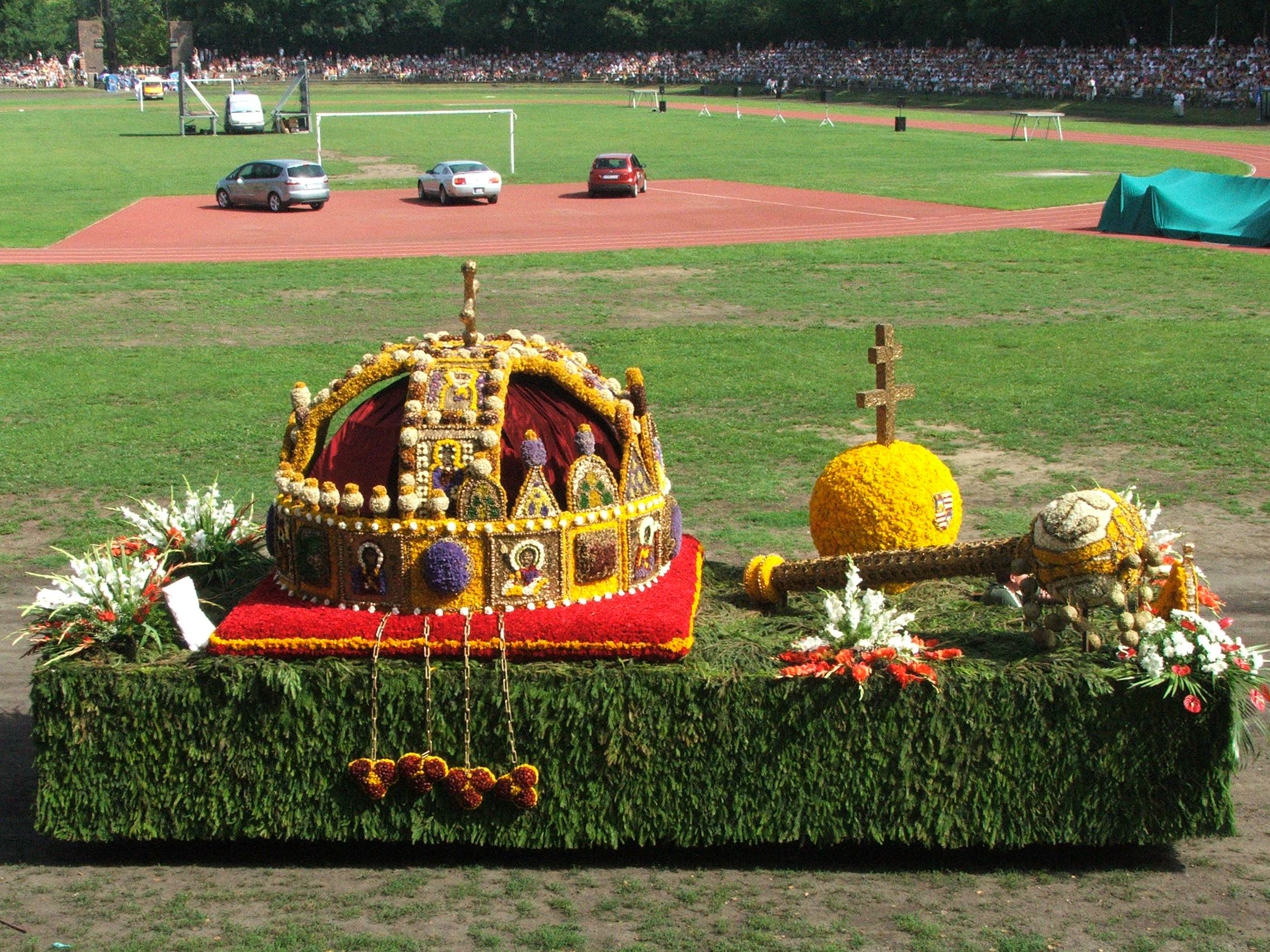
The Debrecen Flower Festival (2006)

Debrecen is the site of an important choral competition, the Béla Bartók International Choir Competition, and is a member city of the European Grand Prix for Choral Singing. Every August the city plays host to a flower festival.

== Economy ==
The development of Debrecen is mainly financed by agricultural, health and educational enterprises. The city is the main centre of shopping centres in Eastern Hungary. The Forum Debrecen is the largest shopping centre in the region. Debrecen is one of the most developed cities in Hungary, the regional centre of international companies such as National Instruments, IT Services Hungary, BT, Continental, BMW, CATL and Healthcare Manufacturers (Teva Pharmaceutical Industries Ltd. and Gedeon Richter Plc.).

== Location ==
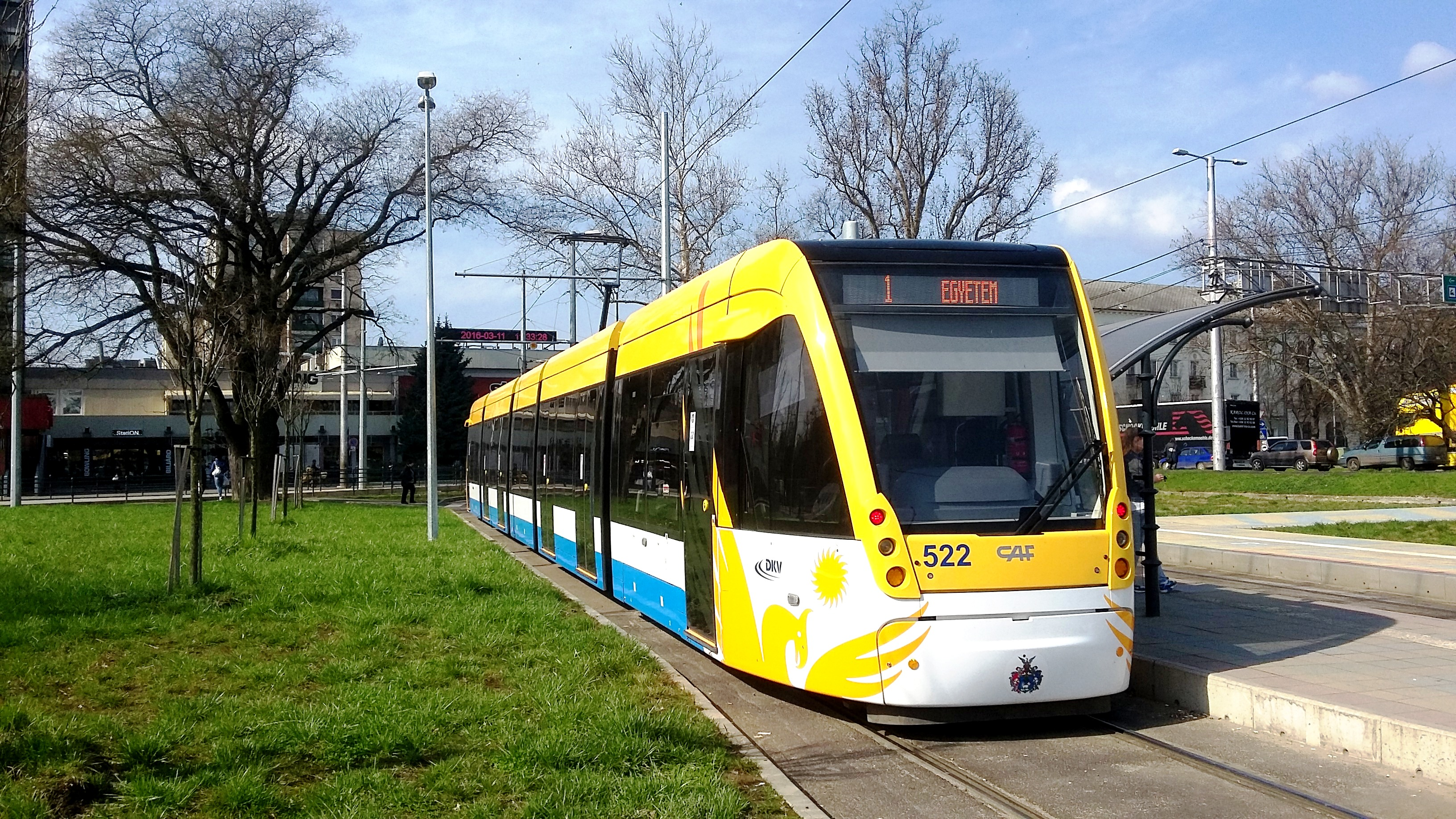
Tram Line 1 at Debrecen Central Station

Debrecen is located on the Great Hungarian Plain, 220 km (137 mi) east of Budapest. Situated nearby is the Hortobágy National Park.

== Transport ==
The city used to be somewhat isolated from Budapest, Hungary's main transport hub. However, the completion of the M35 motorway means Budapest can now be reached in under two hours. Debrecen Airport (the second largest in Hungary) has recently undergone modernisation in order to be able to handle more international flights, although almost all flights to and from Hungary still use Budapest's Ferihegy Airport (now called Budapest Ferenc Liszt International Airport). Cities that can be reached from the Debrecen Airport include Brussels, Eindhoven, London, Malmö, Milan, Tel Aviv, Moscow and Paris. There have also been improvements to some parts of the railway between the capital and Debrecen as part of Hungary's mainly EU-funded National Development Plan for 2004 to 2006.

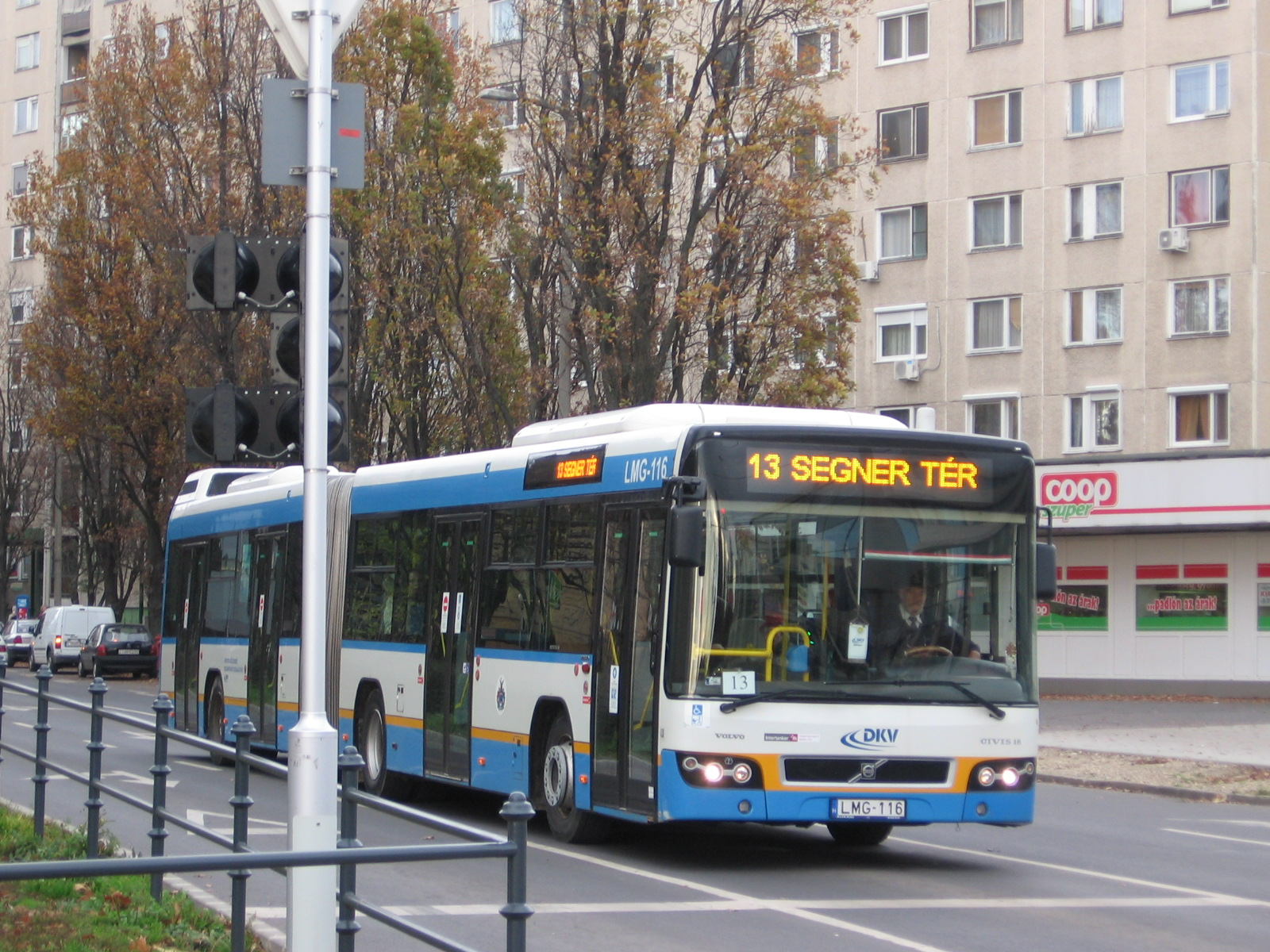
A DKV Volvo B9LA-Alfa Cívis 18 at Bethlen Street on Line 13

There are many railway stations in Debrecen, the most significant is the main station of Debrecen, in addition other smaller stations exist, these include Debrecen-Csapókert, Debrecen-Kondoros, Debrecen-Szabadságtelep and Tócóvölgy.

Debrecen's proximity to Ukraine, Slovakia and Romania enables it to develop as an important trade centre and transport hub for the wider international region.

Local transport in the city consists of buses, trolleybuses, and trams. There are two tram lines, five trolleybus lines, and 60 bus lines. It is provided by the DKV (Debreceni Közlekedési Vállalat, or Transport Company of Debrecen). Nearby towns and villages are linked to the city by Hajdú Volán bus services.

== Sport ==
The city's most famous association football club is Debreceni VSC which won the Nemzeti Bajnokság I seven times, the last one in 2014. Debreceni VSC also known at international level since they reached the 2009-10 UEFA Champions League group stage and the 2010-11 UEFA Europa League group stage. The club's newly built stadium was opened in 2014, where the club could celebrate their seventh title by winning the 2014-15 Nemzeti Bajnokság I. The stadium is also the occasional home of the Hungary national football team. The team hosted Denmark in 2014 and Lithuania in 2015.

The city had other association football clubs competing in the Nemzeti Bajnokság I. One of them was Bocskai FC who could also won the Magyar Kupa once in 1930. The other club from the city was Dózsa MaDISz TE who competed in the 1945-46 Nemzeti Bajnokság I.

The city has hosted several international sporting events in recent years, such as the second World Youth Championships in Athletics in July 2001 and the first IAAF World Road Running Championships in October 2006. The 2007 European SC Swimming Championships and World Artistic Gymnastics Championships of 2002 also took place in Debrecen. Most recently, the city hosted the 19th FAI World Hot Air Balloon Championship in October 2010. In 2012, Debrecen hosted the 31st LEN European Swimming Championships.

The Debrecen Speedway team race at the Perényi Pál Salakmotor Stadion in the south of the city. The stadium also regularly hosts international events including qualifying rounds of the Speedway World Cup and the Speedway European Championship.

=== Association football ===
- Debreceni VSC (seven time Nemzeti Bajnokság I winners)
- Bocskai FC (defunct)
- Dózsa MaDISz TE (defunct)
- Debreceni EAC
- Debreceni MTE (defunct, Nemzeti Bajnokság III winners)
- Debreceni Kinizsi SE (defunct, Nemzeti Bajnokság III winners)

== Main sights ==
- City Downtown
- Reformed Great Church (Nagytemplom)
- City Park (Nagyerdő) and spa
- Déri Museum (art collection including paintings of Mihály Munkácsy; also has a collection of Ancient Egyptian artifacts, and weapons from Europe, the Middle East and Far East)
- Flower Carnival of Debrecen held on 20 August every year
- "Hortobágy" mill
- Nagyerdei Stadion (the home football stadium of the association football club Debreceni VSC)
- Ravatalozó (cemetery)
- Csokonai theatre
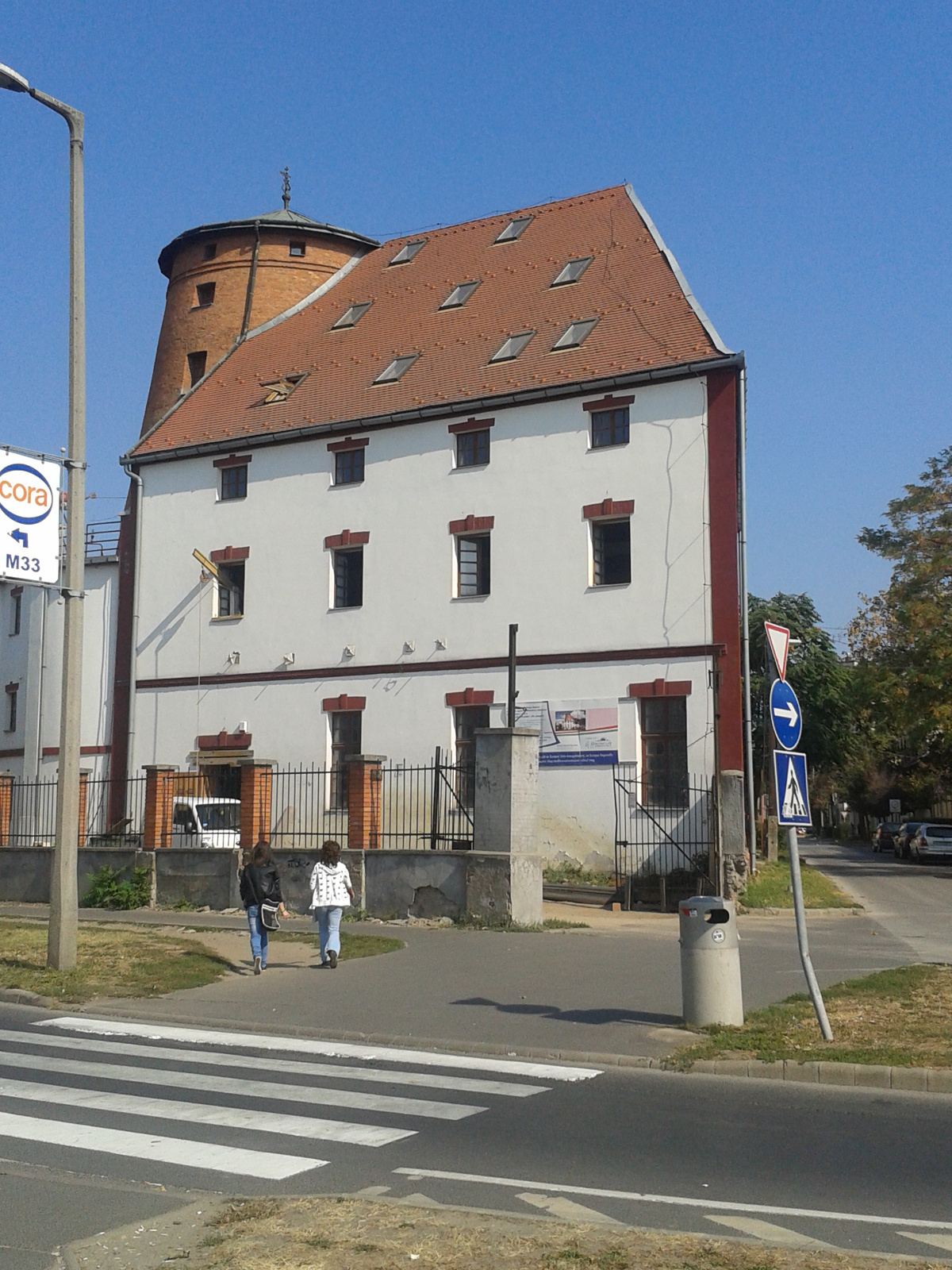
Malom Hotel (former „Hortobágy” mill)

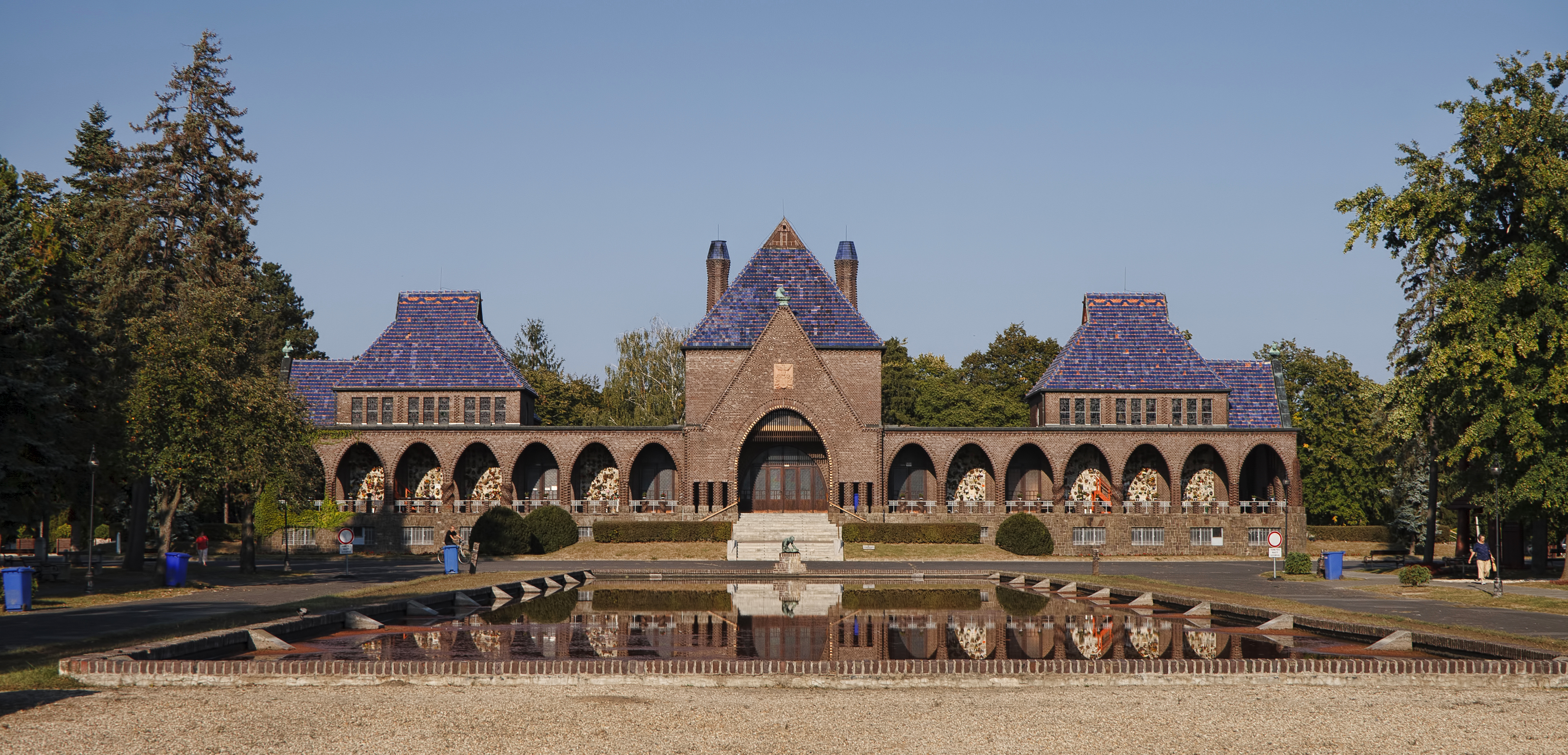
Ravatalozó in Art Nouveau architectural style

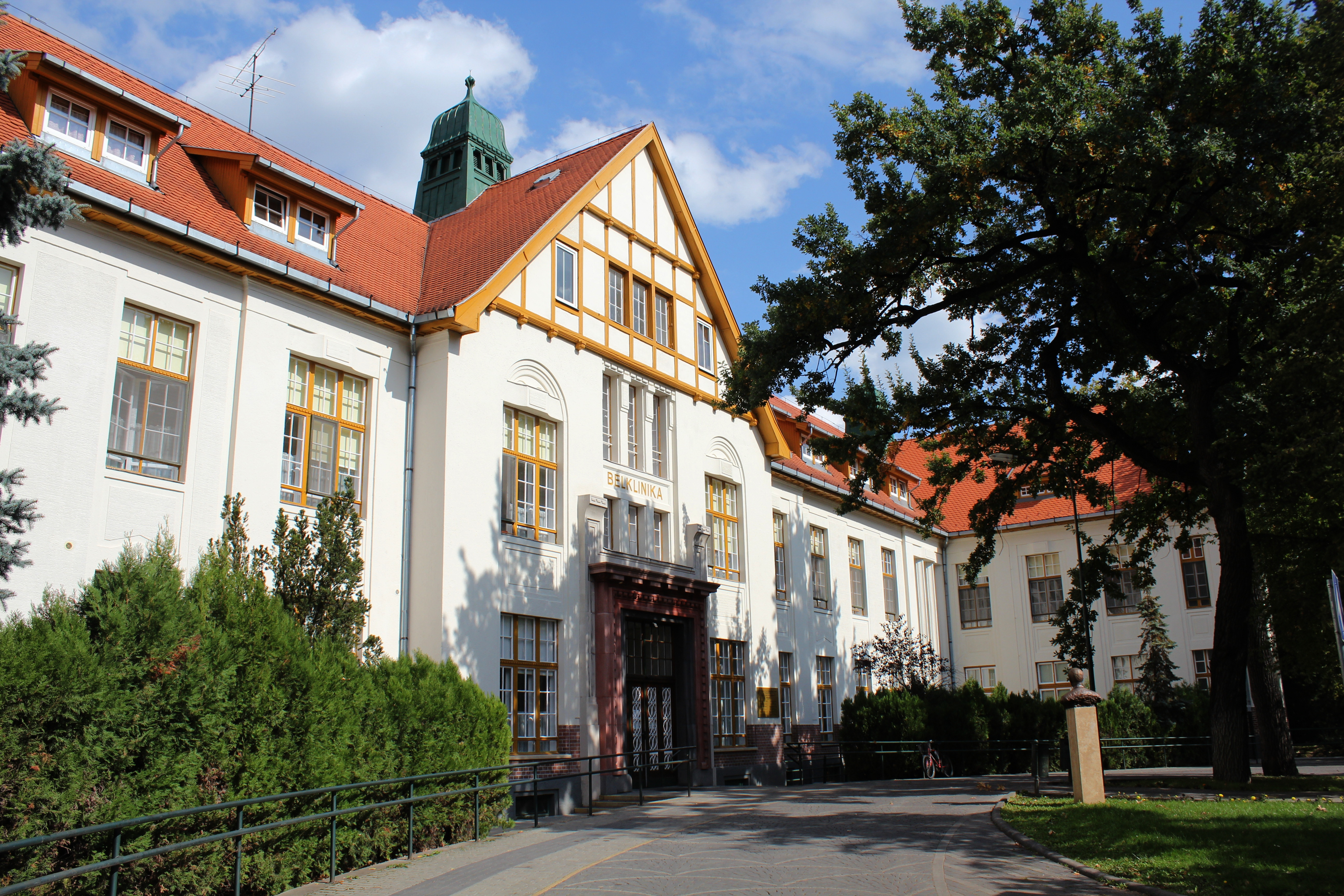
Heritage building in (Nagyerdő)

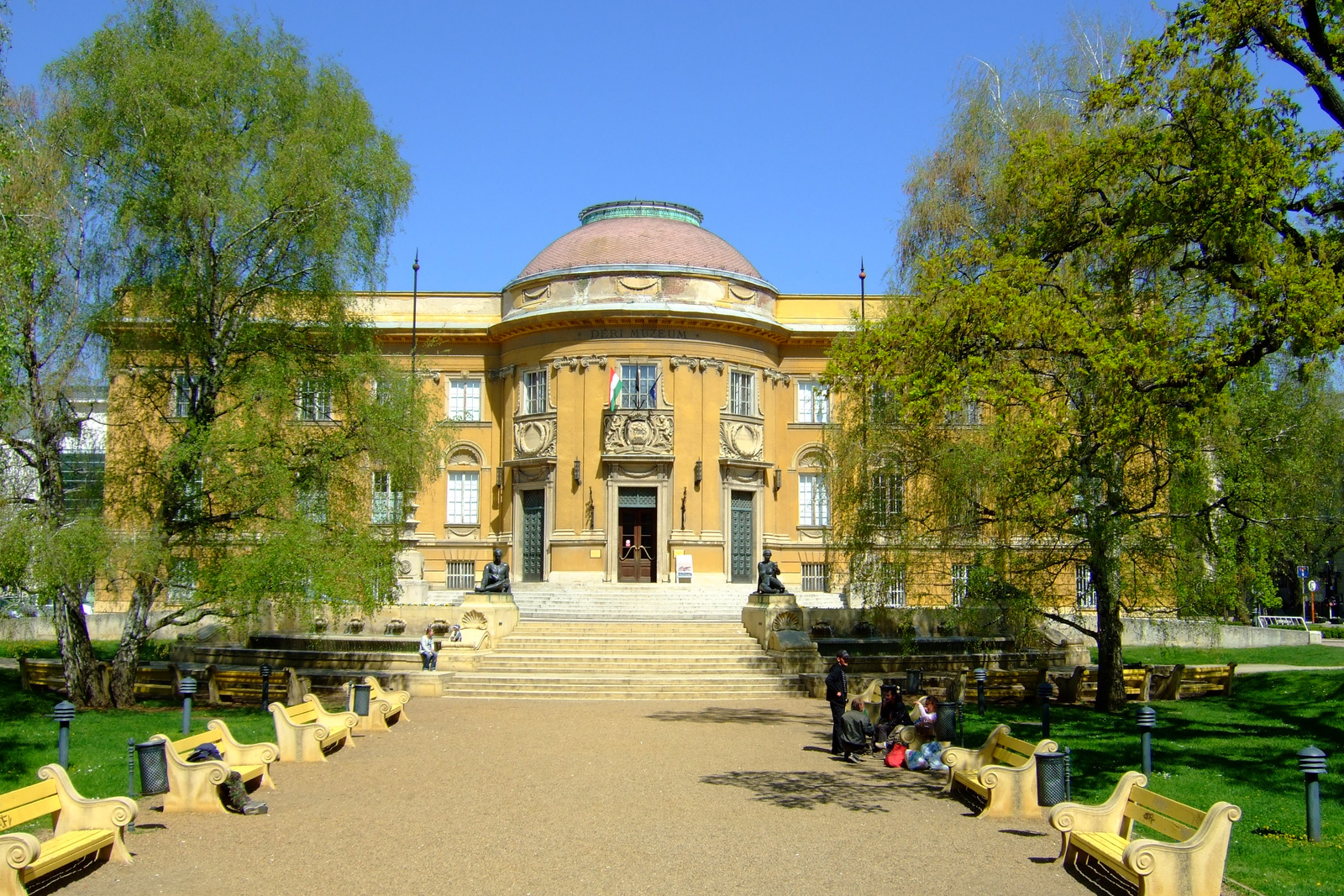
Déri Museum

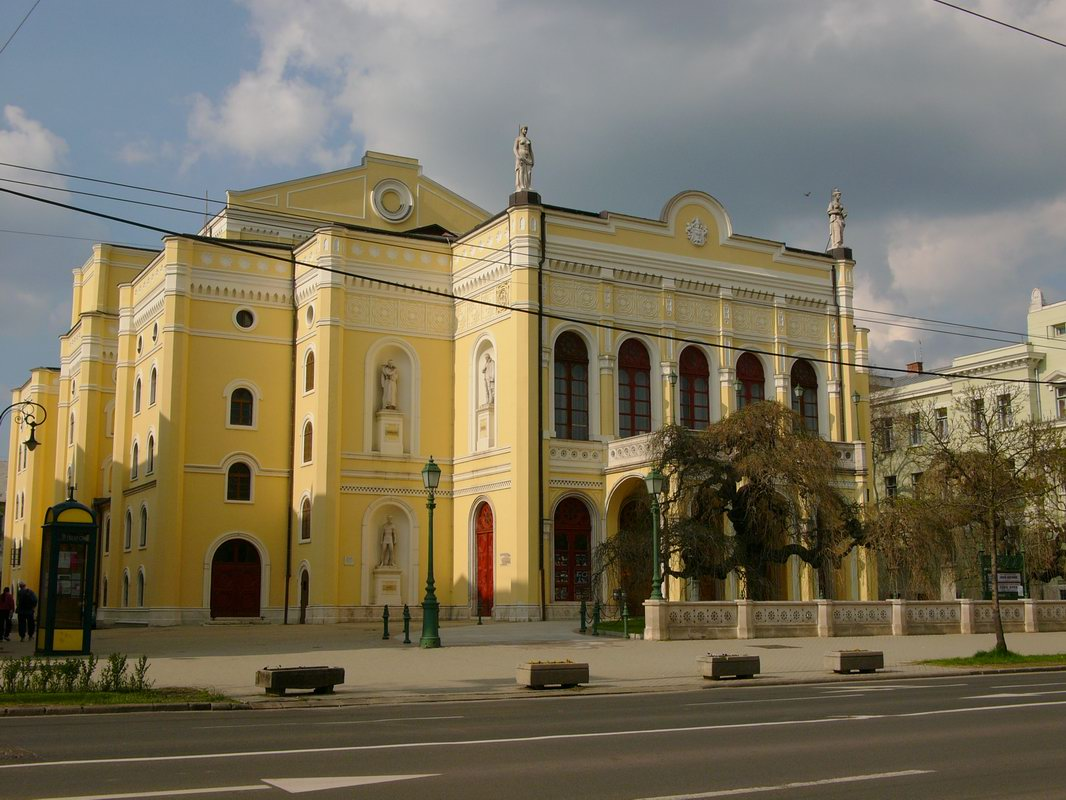
Csokonai theatre

== Politics ==
The current mayor of Debrecen is Dr. László Papp (Fidesz-KDNP).

The local municipal assembly, elected in the 2024 local government elections, is made up of 33 members – 1 mayor, 23 individual constituencies MEPs, and 9 compensation list MEPs. The composition of political parties and alliances is as follows:

| Party | Seats | Current Municipal Assembly |
|---|---|---|
| Fidesz-KDNP | 24 | M |
| Civil Forum Debrecen | 4 | |
| Összefogás a Cívisvárosért | 3 | |
| Mi Hazánk | 2 | |

=== List of mayors ===
List of city mayors from 1990:

| Member | Party | Term of office |
|---|---|---|
| József Hevessy | SZDSZ | 1990–1998 |
| Lajos Kósa | Fidesz (-KDNP) | 1998–2014 |
| László Papp | Fidesz-KDNP | 2014– |

== Notable people ==
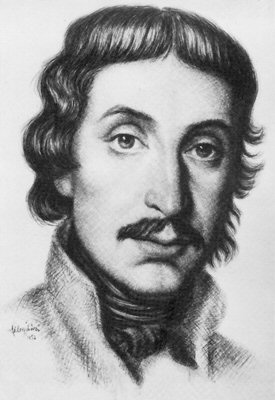
Mihály Csokonai

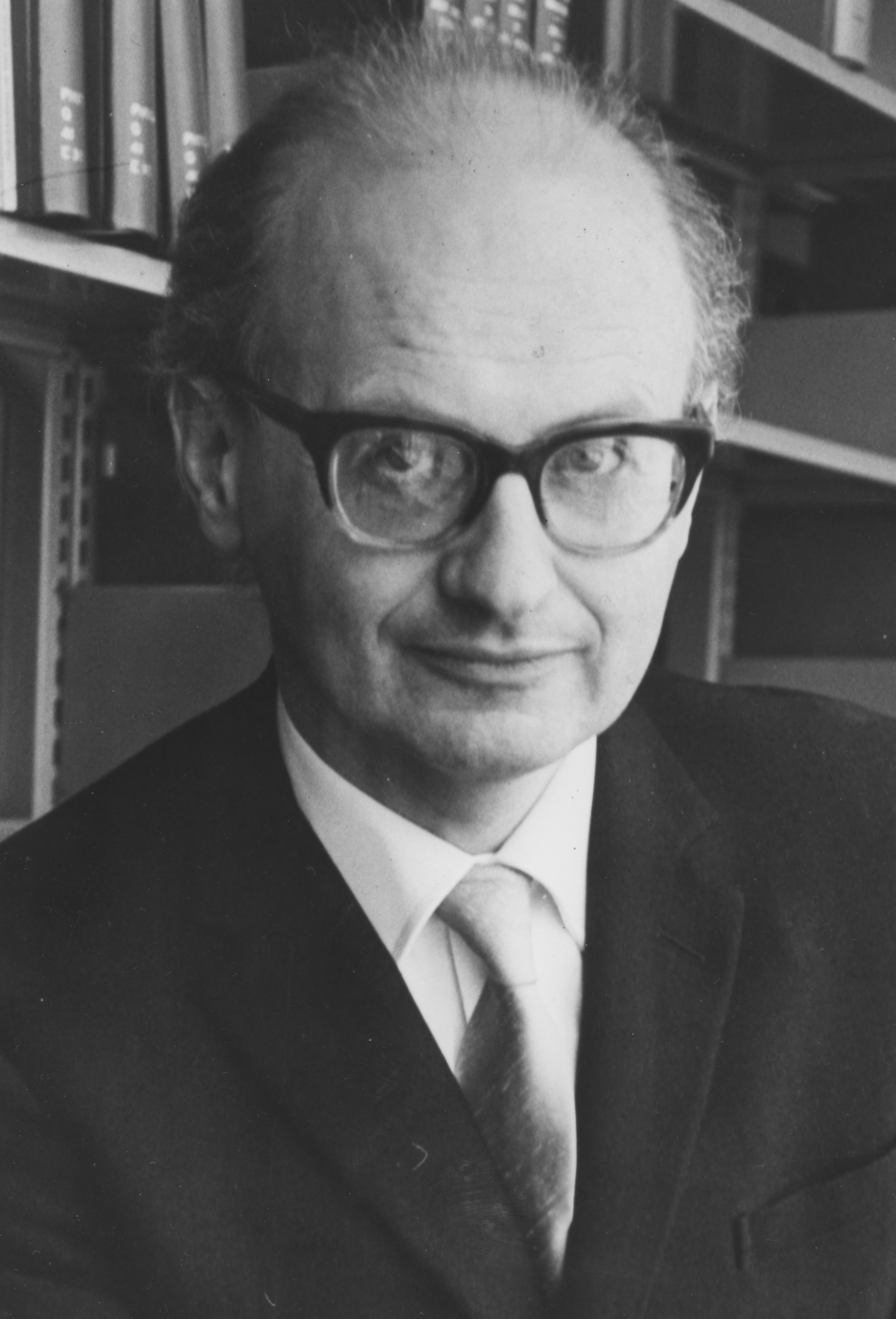
Imre Lakatos

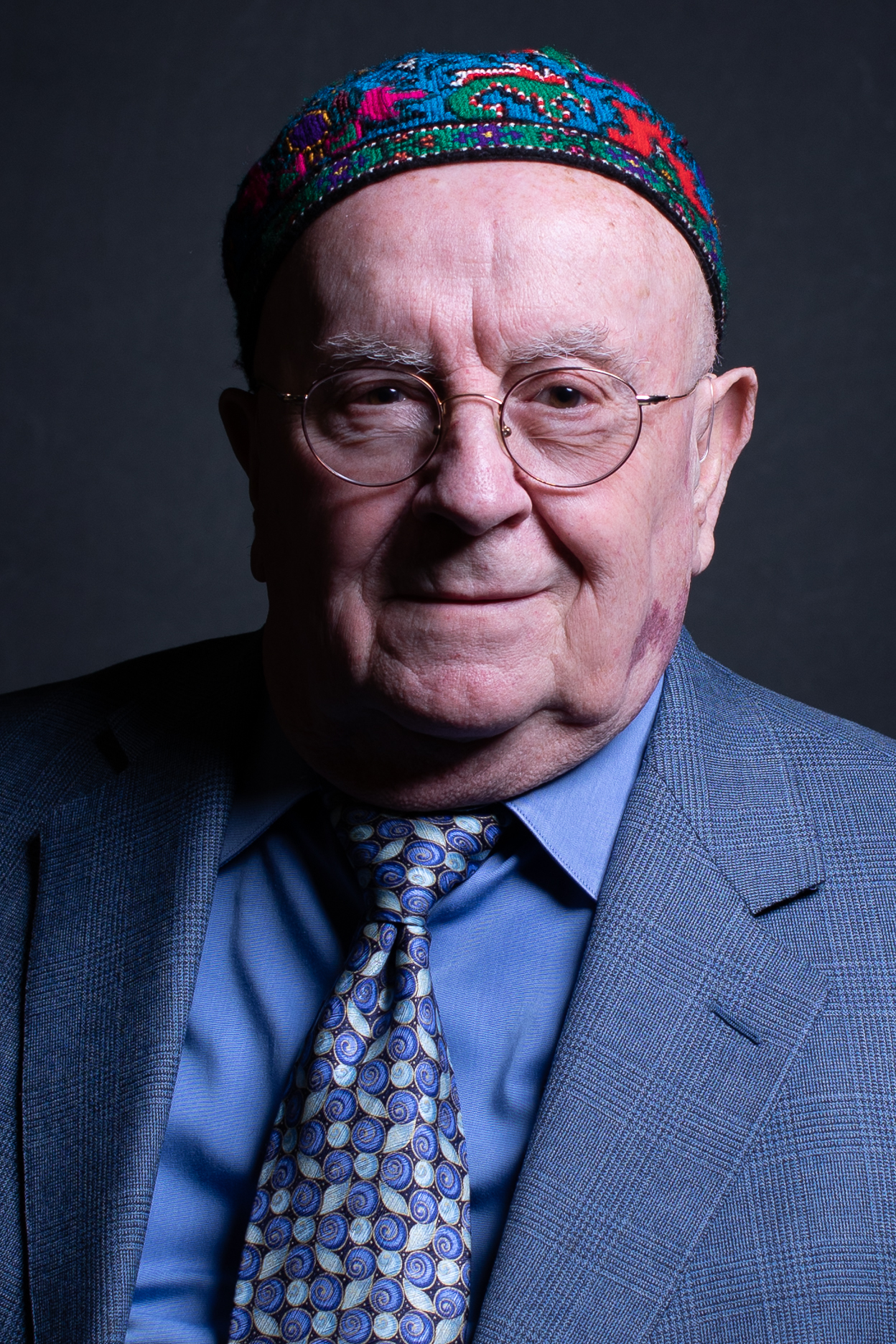
Judah Samet

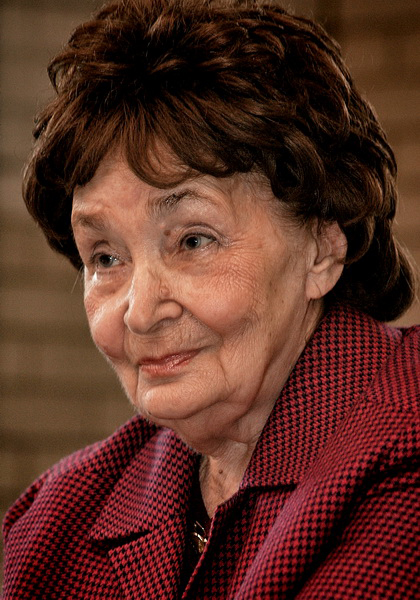
Magda Szabó

=== Born in Debrecen ===
- Emma Adler (1858–1935), writer
- Lorenzo Alvary (1909–1996), operatic bass
- Ferenc Barnás (born 1959), novelist
- Zsolt Baumgartner (born 1981), first Hungarian Formula One driver
- Borbala Biro (born 1957), biologist and agricultural scientist
- Mihály Csokonai (1773–1805), poet
- Sari Dienes (1898–1992), artist
- Éva Fahidi (1925–2023), Auschwitz survivor
- Mihály Fazekas (1766–1828), writer
- Mihály Flaskay (born 1982), breaststroke swimmer
- Nóra Görbe (born 1956), actress, singer and pop icon
- Meshulam Gross (1863–1947), Hungarian-American entrepreneur
- Boglárka Kapás (born 1993), swimmer, 2019 World Champion - 200 m butterfly, 2016 Olympic bronze medalist - 800 m freestyle
- George Karpati (1934–2009), physician, neurologist, surgeon, teacher, author
- Rivka Keren (born 1946), Israeli writer
- Vivien Keszthelyi (born 2000), racing driver
- Miklós Kocsár (1933-2019), composer
- Imre Lakatos (1922–1974), philosopher of mathematics and science
- Paul László (1900–1993), architect
- Gábor Máthé (born 1985), tennis Deaflympics champion
- Mihály Nagy (born 1937), high school teacher, research teacher, university doctor, mineralogist, meteorite researcher
- Judah Samet (1938-2022), Hungarian-American businessman, speaker, and Holocaust survivor
- Magda Szabó (1917–2007), writer
- József Váradi (born 1965), CEO of Wizz Air
- Chaim Michael Dov Weissmandl (1903–1957), rabbi at the Slovak Nitra yeshiva and post-WWII rebuilt the yeshiva in Mount Kisco NY, discovered the Torah Codes - coded messages in the Torah, during the Holocaust established one of the most import rescue groups: the Bratislava Working Group together with Gisi Fleischmann, initiated high-level negotiations with the Nazis to save the Jews of Slovakia and later much of Europe by the Europa Plan

=== Lived in Debrecen ===
- Endre Ady (1877–1919), poet
- Julia Bathory (1901–2000), glass artist
- Rudolf Charousek (1873–1812? 1873 until grade 4), World Champion chess master
- Géza Hofi (1936–2002), stand-up comedian
- Andrew Karpati Kennedy, author and literary critic
- Sándor Petőfi (1823–1849), poet
- Alfréd Rényi (1921–1970), mathematician
- Éva Risztov (born 1985), Olympic champion swimmer
- Moshe Stern (1914–1997), rabbi and authority on Jewish law
- Sándor Szalay (1909–1987), physicist, founder of ATOMKI
- Árpád Tóth (1886–1928), poet

=== Died in Debrecen ===
- Pierre-Octave Ferroud (1900-1936), French composer

== Twin towns – sister cities ==
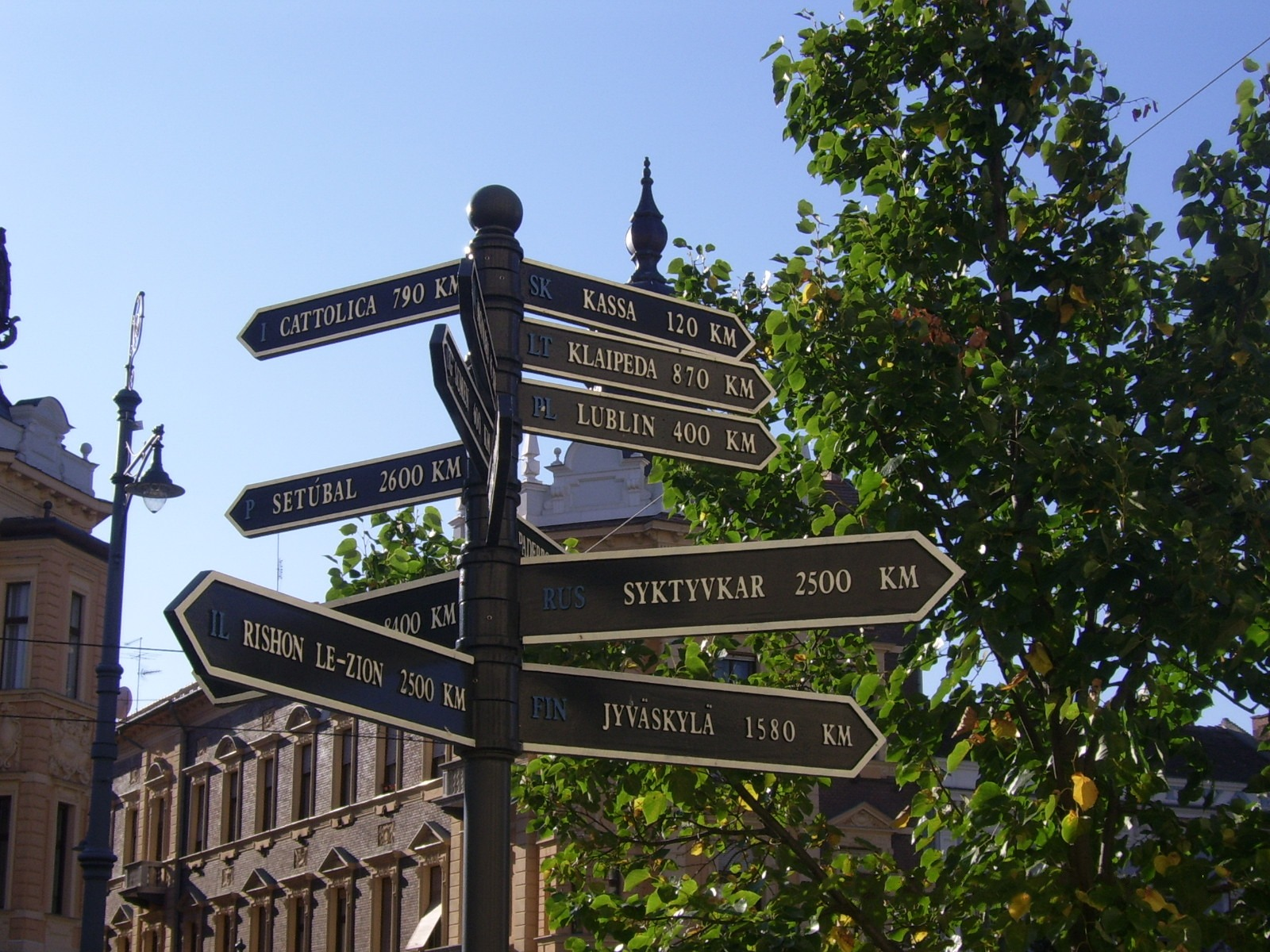
A signpost with distances to Debrecen's twin towns

Debrecen is twinned with:

- Brno, Czech Republic
- Cattolica, Italy
- Jyväskylä, Finland
- Klaipėda, Lithuania
- (Slovakia) Košice, Slovak Republic
- (Republic of Ireland) Limerick County, Ireland
- Lublin, Poland
- New Brunswick, United States
- Oradea, Romania
- Paderborn, Germany
- Patras, Greece
- Rishon LeZion, Israel
- Saint Petersburg, Russia
- Setúbal, Portugal
- Shumen, Bulgaria
- Syktyvkar, Russia
- Taitung City, Taiwan
- Toluca, Mexico
- Tongliao, China

== See also ==
=== Debrecen cuisine ===
- Debrecener – a pork sausage
