= Public transport in Debrecen =

Public transport systems in Debrecen, Hungary

Public transport in Debrecen, Hungary, is provided by DKV Zrt. (Hungarian: Debreceni Közlekedési Vállalat, lit. 'Public Transport Company of Debrecen').

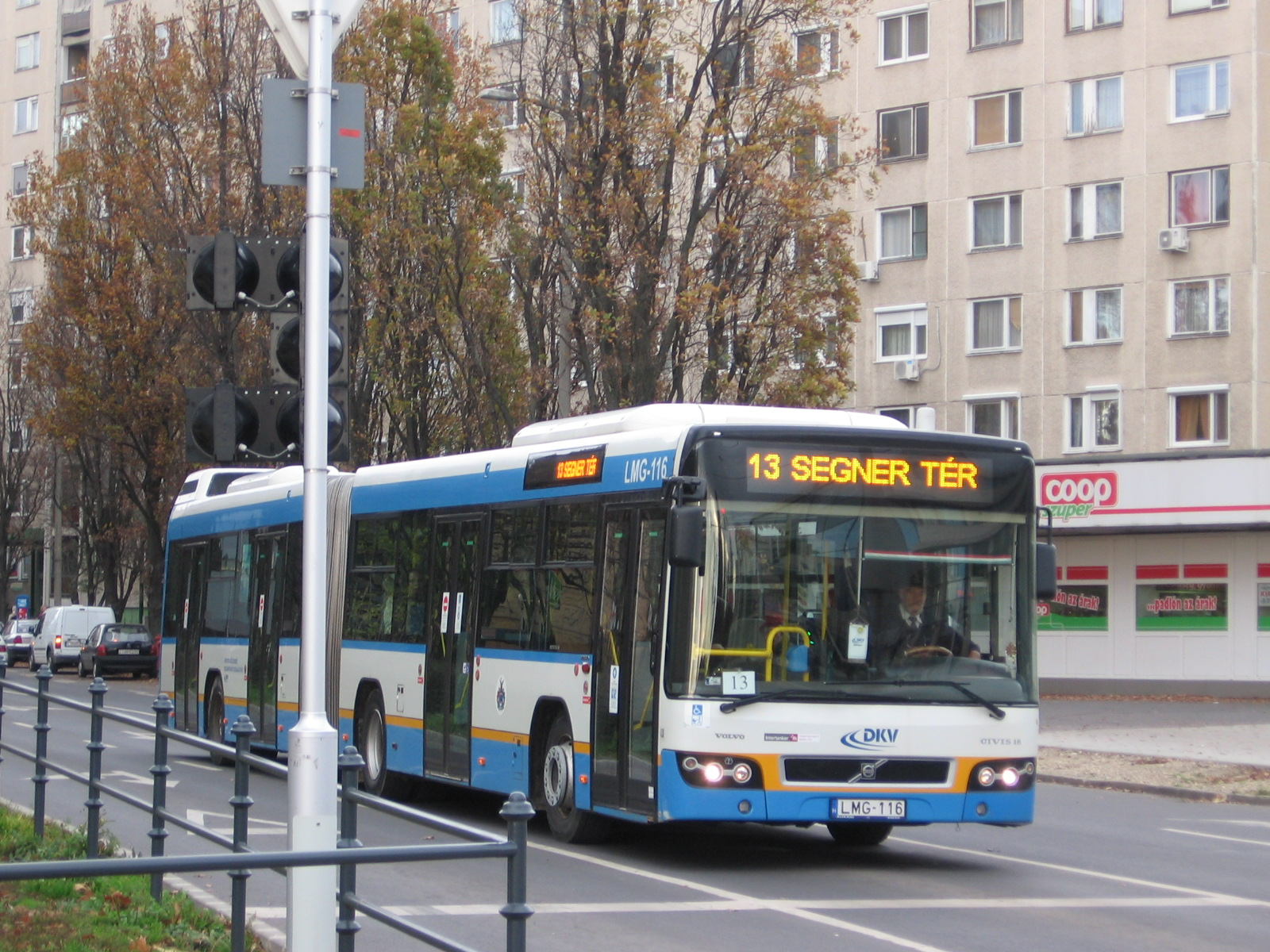
Volvo-Alfa Civis 18 DKV bus in Debrecen

Before mid-2009, two companies provided public transport in the city: trams and trolleybuses were operated by DKV while buses were operated by Hajdú Volán, which provides transport in the rest of Hajdú-Bihar county. DKV took over bus transport on 1 July after winning a tender. DKV has 140 buses, 40 of which are articulated. All buses are low-floor and air-conditioned.

== DKV ==
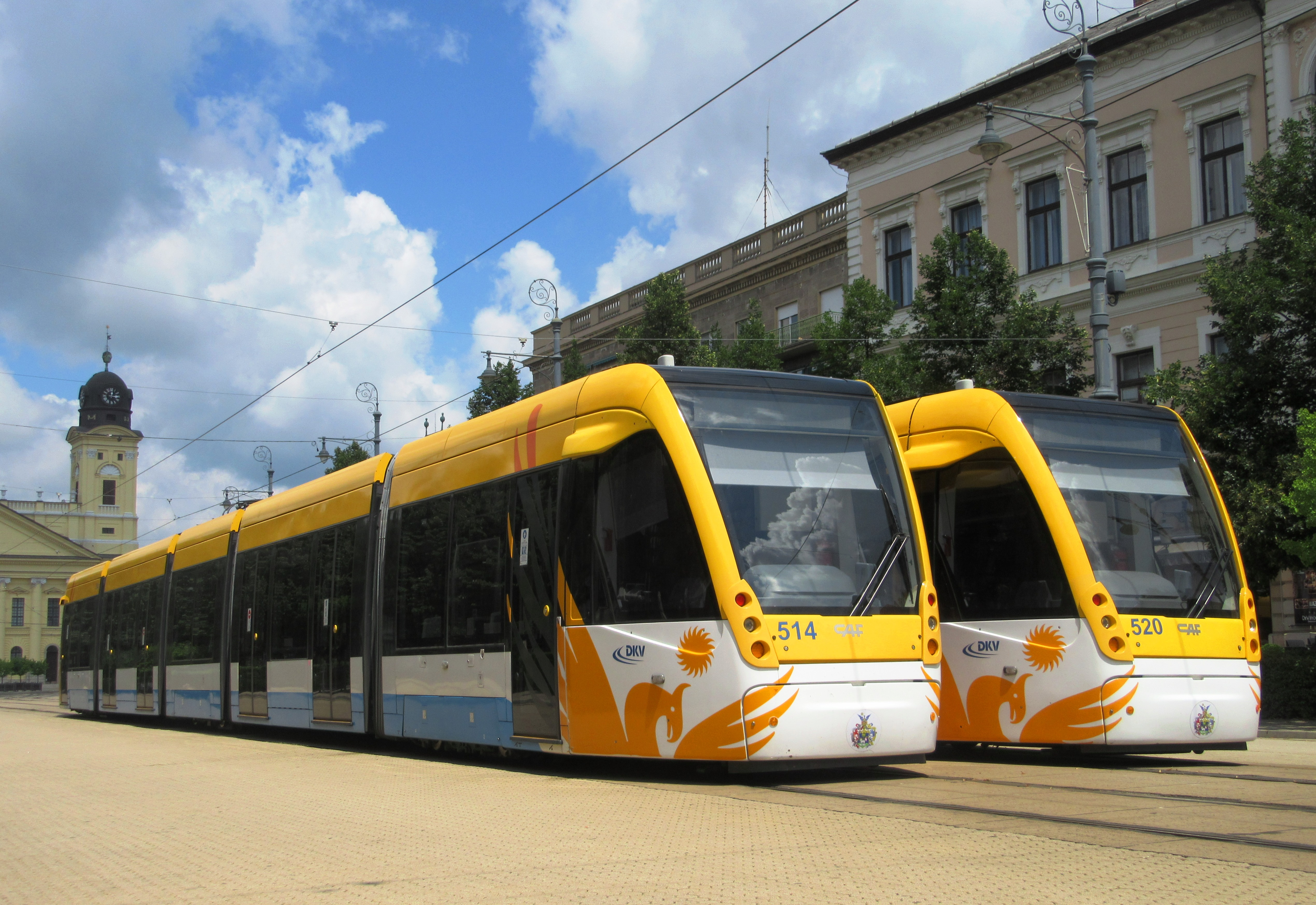
Two CAF Urbos 3 trams in Debrecen operated by DKV

The company was founded in 1883 as Debrecen Local Tramway Company. It started providing public transport on 2 October 1884 with horse-drawn and steam-powered trams. The first electric tram started operating in 1911. From 1906 the towns of Hajdúsámson and, later, Nyírbátor were connected to Debrecen by a railway, also operated by the same company.

By the 1940s there were already ten tram lines. On 2 June 1944 the city was bombed, and the tramway system was seriously damaged. It was repaired by 1947, and seven tram lines served the city until the 1970s, which brought a decrease in the popularity of trams. Tramways were demolished all over the country, the role of trams was taken over by buses. Today Debrecen is one of only four Hungarian cities to have trams, although only one line survived. The importance of DKV decreased, and the company lost its leading role in the public transport of Debrecen.

Trolleybuses started operating in 1985, taking over several lines which, until the 1970s, had been tram-operated.

The company became state property on 15 July 1950, and is now owned by the city.

=== Trams and trolleybuses ===
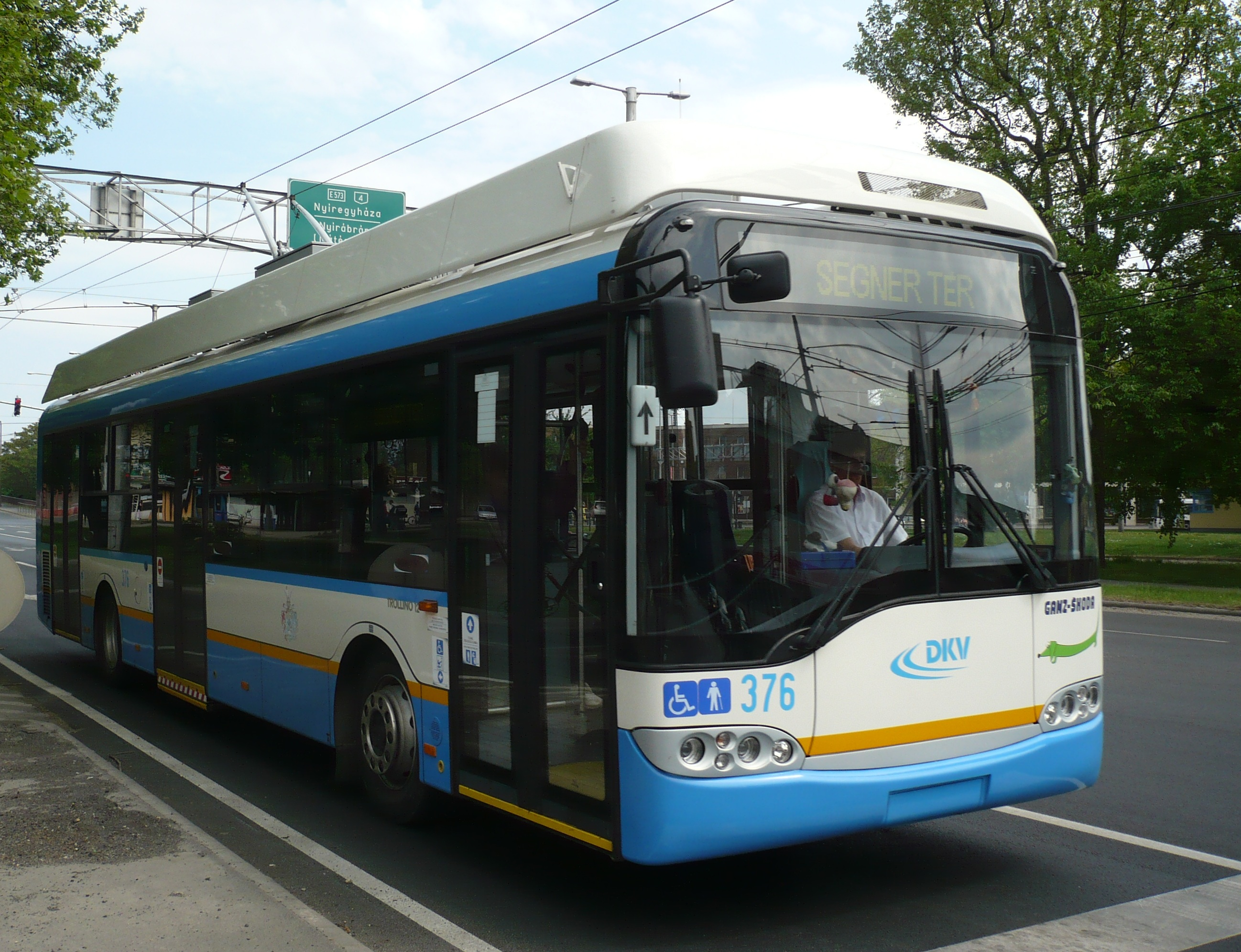
Ganz-Solaris type low-floor trolleybus

Between 1970 and 1984 twenty-one FVV trams entered service. The same tram type was used in Budapest, Miskolc and Szeged; the trams for the latter two cities were built by DKV. The company still owns eight of them, but they can rarely be seen on the streets.

The typical blue trams (KCSV-6) of Debrecen were built between 1993 and 1997. There are only eleven of them in existence, all in Debrecen.

The company also owns an old nostalgia tram.

The ZiU-9 trolleybuses were manufactured in the Soviet Union; twenty-six entered service from 1985 onwards. Four articulated trolleybuses have been in use since 1991. New Solaris Trollino buses have been purchased since April 2005, in place of old Soviet buses. In October 2011 the Spanish firm CAF was contracted to supply eighteen 32 m (105 ft) Urbos low-floor trams. They became operational in 2014, on the second tram line which opened in late February 2014.

=== Buses ===
Since 2009, bus services have also been operated by DKV (except the three "CORA" bus lines, which are still operated by Hajdú Volán). Currently, there are over fifty routes and three bus types: Volvo Alfa Civis 12,18, Mercedes-Benz Conecto G, and a single ITK Reform 500LE.
