= Ferenc Barnás =

Hungarian novelist

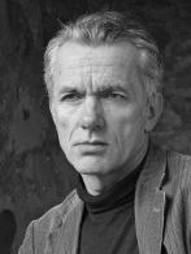
- Born: 1959 (age 66–67)
- Education: Eötvös Loránd University
- Writing career
- Language: Hungarian
- Notable awards: Sándor Márai Prize (2001), Tibor Déry Prize (2006), AEGON Prize (2013)
- Website: ferencbarnas.hu

Ferenc Barnás is a Hungarian novelist.

== Biography ==
Ferenc Barnás was born in 1959 in Debrecen, Hungary. From 1982 until 1988 he attended universities in Debrecen, Budapest, and Munich, graduated from Eötvös Loránd University (ELTE) in 1988 with MA degrees in Hungarian language and literature and Aesthetics. In 1991 he earned his doctoral degree at ELTE with a dissertation titled Hermann Hesse világképe (The World View of Hermann Hesse). From 1988 until 1994, he taught literature, philosophy and aesthetics in secondary schools for the arts in Budapest. From 1990 until 1992 he worked as an instructor of music aesthetics at the Department of Cultural History, ELTE. From 2000 until 2015 he worked as a museum attendant. He made a living as freelance writer from 1994 until 2000, and from 2015 until now.

== Works ==
=== Novels ===
- Az élősködő (The Parasite)
- Bagatell (Bagatelle)
- A kilencedik (The Ninth)
- Másik halál (Another Death)
- Életünk végéig

His works have been translated into English, French, German, Czech, Croatian, Serb, Indonesian.

== Awards ==
- 2019: Milán Füst Prize
- 2013: AEGON Prize
- 2006: Tibor Déry Prize
- 2001: Sándor Márai Prize
