= Urban areas in Hungary =

This is a list of the most populous urban areas in Hungary, based on official data of the Hungarian Central Statistical Office (KSH) and the Organisation for Economic Co-operation and Development (OECD).

== Methodology ==
The functional urban areas identified with the methodology described in the book Redefining “urban”: A new way to measure metropolitan areas (OECD Publishing, 2012) are here listed by size, according to four different classes:

- Small urban areas (population between 50,000 and 200,000)
- Medium-sized urban areas (population between 200,000 and 500,000)
- Metropolitan areas (population between 500,000 and 1.5 million)
- Large metropolitan areas (population above 1.5 million)

== List of most populous urban areas ==
Rank	Functional urban area	Class-type (according to OECD)	Population (2000, OECD)	Population (2011, OECD)	Population (2018, Eurostat)	Major subdivisions
1	Budapest	Large metropolitan area	2,786,150	2,909,375	2,978,067	Budapest, Érd, Dunakeszi, Szigetszentmiklós, Vác, Gödöllő, Budaörs, Szentendre
2	Debrecen	Medium-sized urban area	312,464	336,639	326,626	Debrecen
3	Miskolc	Medium-sized urban area	329,618	305,463	287,287	Miskolc
4	Székesfehérvár	Medium-sized urban area	267,540	276,541	270,835	Székesfehérvár
5	Győr	Medium-sized urban area	244,098	243,874	251,317	Győr
6	Pécs	Medium-sized urban area	274,112	263,804	247,720	Pécs, Komló
7	Szeged	Medium-sized urban area	236,262	249,790	242,013	Szeged
8	Nyíregyháza	Medium-sized urban area	237,770	240,690	235,449	Nyíregyháza
9	Kecskemét	Small urban area	147,504	187,608	186,782	Kecskemét
10	Szombathely	Small urban area	134,602	149,639	147,933	Szombathely
TOTAL						

== See also ==
- List of cities and towns of Hungary
- Regions of Hungary
- Counties of Hungary
