= Reformed Great Church of Debrecen =

Church in Debrecen, Hungary

Coordinates: 47°31′55″N 21°37′26″E

- Debreceni református nagytemplom (Hungarian)
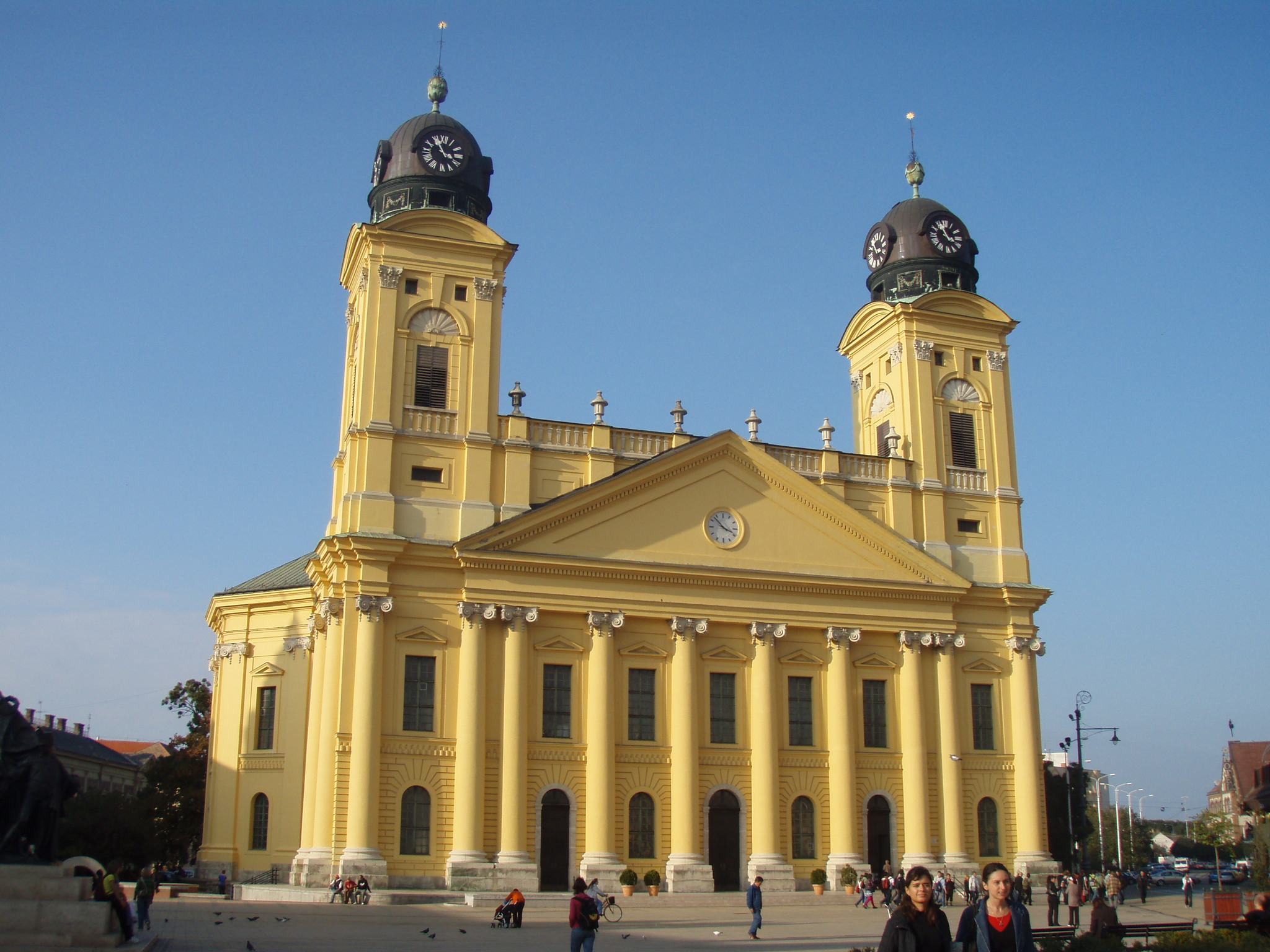

- Location within Hungary
- Country: Hungary
- Denomination: Reformed Christianity
- Website: www.nagytemplom.hu

Architecture
- Functional status: Active
- Architect: Mihály Péchy
- Style: Classicism
- Years built: 1805–1824

Specifications
- Length: 61 meters
- Width: 14 meters

Administration
- District: Transtibiscan Church District

The Reformed Great Church of Debrecen (Hungarian: Debreceni református nagytemplom) or Protestant Great Church of Debrecen is a Protestant church located in the city of Debrecen, Hungary, built between 1805 and 1824 in the neoclassical style.

It is an icon of the Reformed Church in Hungary, the church has earned the city the nickname "the Calvinist Rome". With a floor area of 1,500 m^{2} it is the largest Protestant church building in Hungary, and also has the largest bell of all Hungarian Protestant churches.

== History ==
A church already stood here in the Middle Ages, but it burnt down. Andrew Church (András-templom), a Gothic hall church was built in its place between 1297 and 1311. Its area was about 16×46 meters. This church burnt down in 1564.

In 1626 the already Protestant citizens of Debrecen started to rebuild the St. Andrew Church. With the support of George I Rákóczi reconstruction was finished in 1628. In 1640–1642 a tower was constructed and a large bell, made of Austrian cannonballs was placed in it. Its unplastered brick tower was built in 1642, and because of its red-brick exterior, the townspeople soon began calling it the Red Church (Verestemplom). In 1707, during the freedom fight led by Francis II Rákóczi the church suffered heavy damages from the imperial troops. The church burnt down on June 11, 1802, during a great fire which destroyed most of Debrecen.

The construction of the Great Church began on April 8, 1805. It was designed by Mihály Péchy, but the plans were altered several times during the construction, causing much frustration to the builders. The original plan featured a church with a cross-shaped ground plan and a large dome, but the plan was discarded, mainly due to financial reasons.

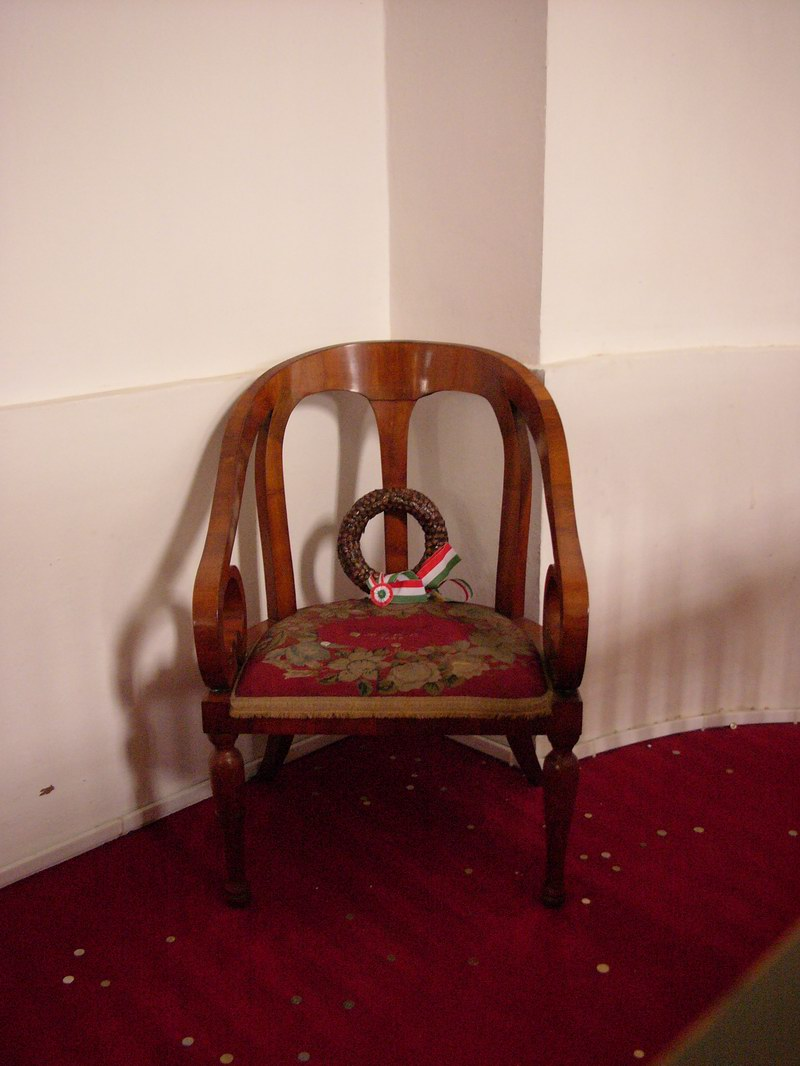
The chair of Kossuth in the Reformed Great Church of Debrecen (1848)

The western tower was finished by 1818, the eastern tower on August 6, 1821. The towers are 61 meters high. Originally a dome was planned to crown the building, this was not built, but when the construction was finished, the facade seemed unattractive with the large empty space between the towers, so in 1823–1824 the facade was slightly modified, using the plans of Károly Rábl. The tower roofs feature Baroque elements. A nice panorama can be seen from the left (western) tower. The old Rákóczi bell, restored after the fire, is in this tower too.

During the Hungarian Revolution of 1848 Lajos Kossuth made the Hungarian Declaration of Independence in the Great Church, declared the dethronement of the House of Habsburg on April 14, 1849 and was elected governor of the country there as well. The armchair in which he sat can be viewed in the church.

== Architecture ==
The main nave of the church is 55 meters long and nearly 15 m wide, the transept is 38 meters long and more than 14 meters wide. The interior height of the church is 21 meters, and the towers are 61 meters tall. Similar to other Protestant churches, the inside walls are painted white. The interior is 21 meters high. The church accommodates about 5000 people (with 3000 seats).

The classical organ and the pulpit

== Organs ==
The church has two organs, one of them is in the southern part, above the main entrance. This is a new, electronic organ with resonance pipes, three manuals and 52 registers, built by Péter Albert in 1981. The older, Classical organ is behind the pulpit. It was built in 1838 by Jakob Deutschmann. It is a cabinet organ with 3 manuals and 43 registers.

The organs can be heard not only during church services, as the Great Church regularly serves as a venue for organ recitals and classical music concerts.

== Bells ==
There is one bell in each of the church's two towers;

=== Rákóczi Bell ===
Hungary's largest Protestant and the country's eighth-largest bell hangs in the western tower. It weighs 3,800 kg and has a bottom diameter of 198 cm.

Rákóczi Bell

The original bell was cast in 1636 in Gyulafehérvár (now Alba Iulia) by Prince György Rákóczi I of Transylvania, with the assistance of János Régner, a master bell-maker from Németpróna (now Nitrianske Pravno). It did not melt in the fire of 1802, but fell to the ground when the wooden stand burned; locals tried to water it down, causing it to crack due to sudden thermal expansion. The bell was recast in 1873 by Ignácz Hiltzer, an Austrian foundryman from Wiener Neustadt and József Pozdech, a locksmith from Pest.

=== Little Bell ===
It was cast in 1865 at the same location as the Rákóczi Bell. One side features Debrecen’s 17th-century coat of arms, flanked by an angel on either side.

== See also ==
- Debrecen
- Reformed Church in Hungary
- Religion in Hungary

== Gallery ==
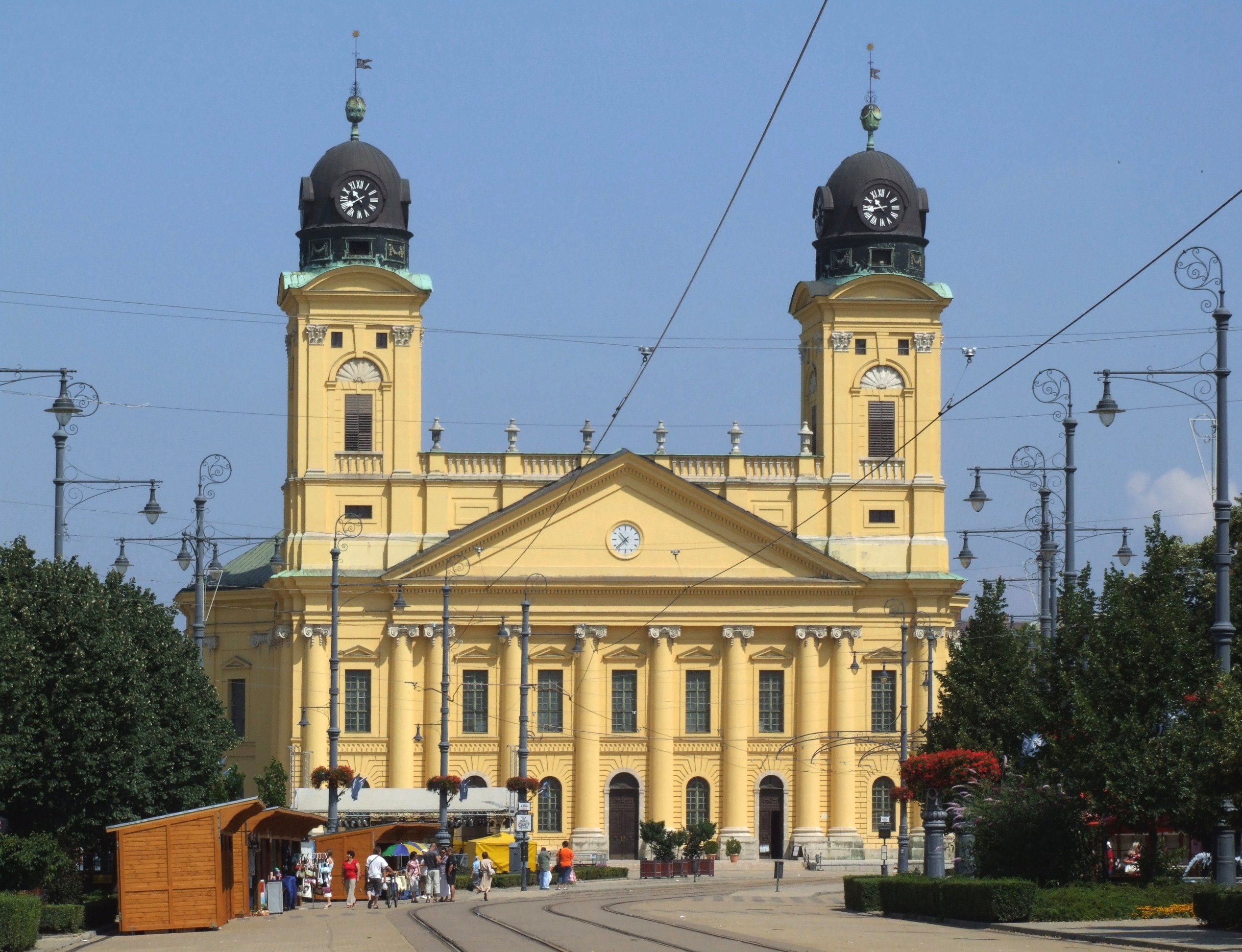
Main façade

Back of the church

Statue of Lajos Kossuth

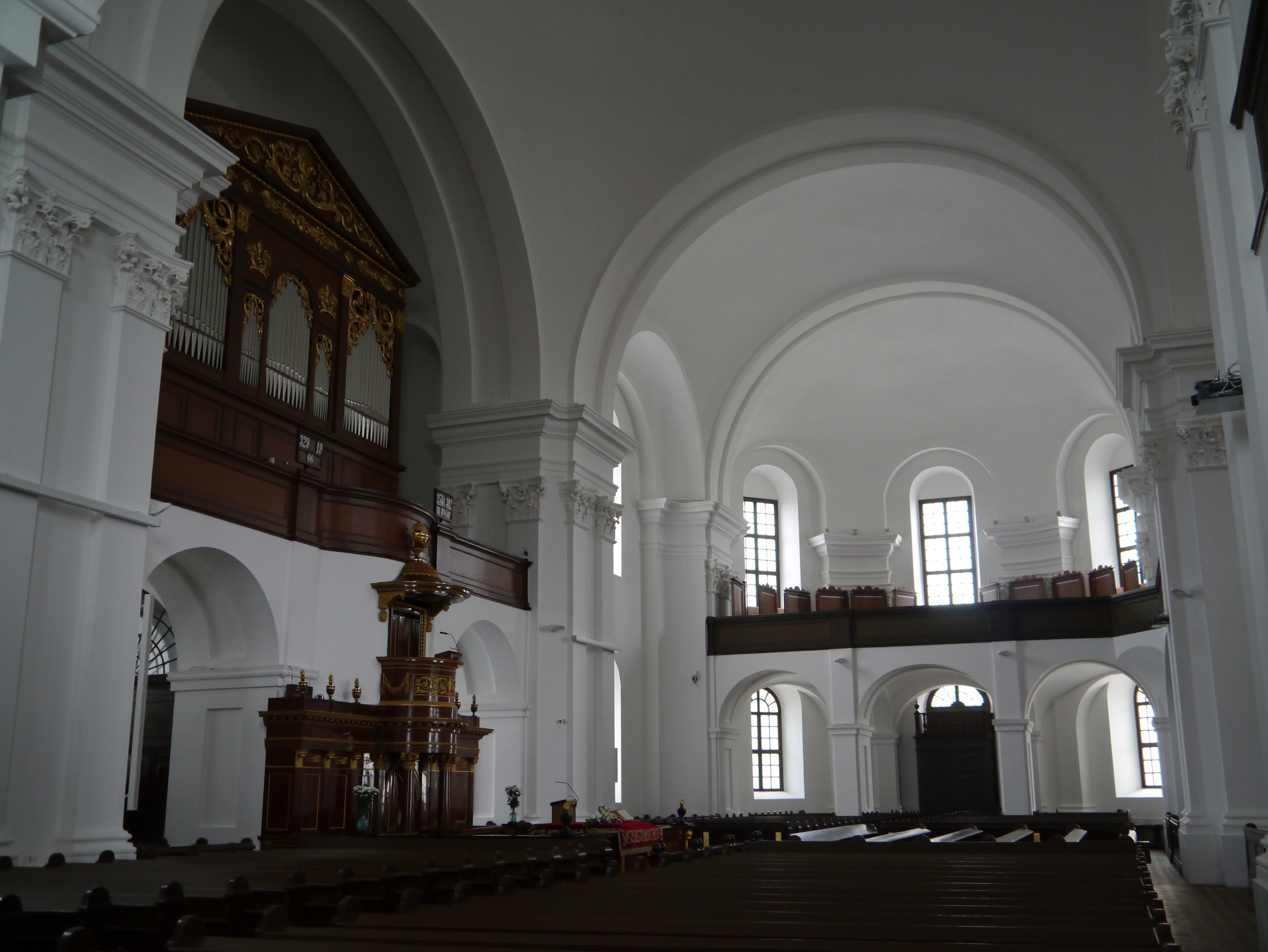
Interior

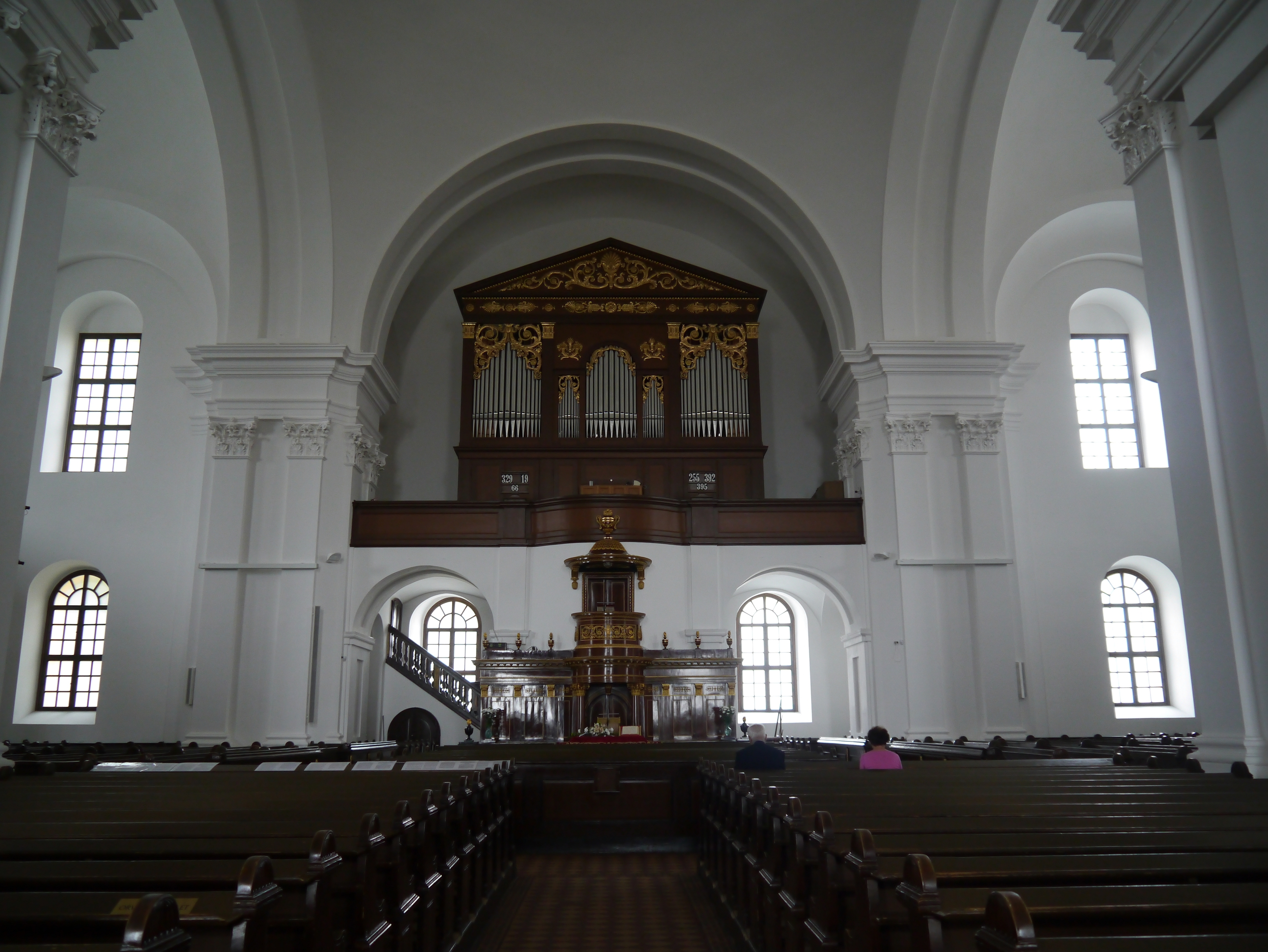

Pulpit

The church in 1975
