= Pernarava–Šaravai Forest =

Forest in Kėdainiai District Municipality, central Lithuania

Pernarava-Šaravai Forest Lithuanian: Pernaravos–Šaravų miškai
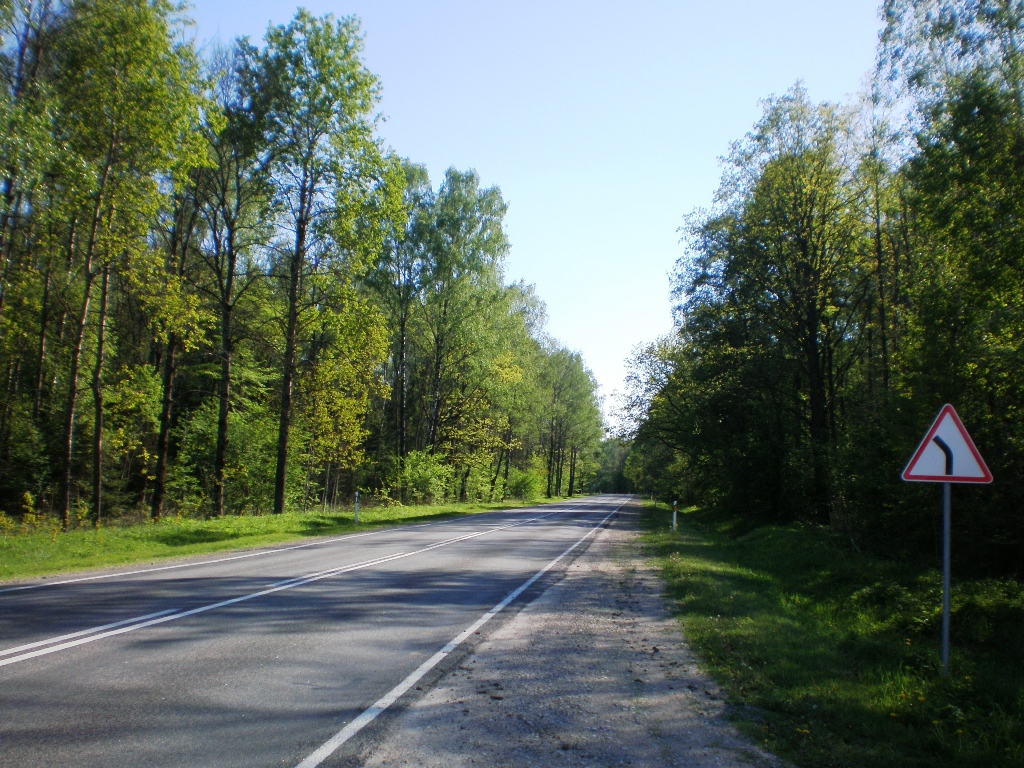
- The Kėdainiai-Cinkiškiai road running through the Pernarava-Šaravai Forest

- Location within Lithuania
- Interactive map of Pernarava-Šaravai Forest

Geography
- Location: Kėdainiai District Municipality, Lithuania
- Coordinates: 55.233°N 23.766°E
- Area: 35.7 km^{2} (13.8 sq mi)

Ecology
- Forest cover: birch, spruce, aspen
- Fauna: wild boar, roe deer, red fox, moose, hare

The Pernarava–Šaravai Forest (Lithuanian: Pernaravos–Šaravų miškai) is a forest in Kėdainiai District Municipality, central Lithuania, located 2 kilometres (1.2 mi) west off Josvainiai. Covering an area of 3,570 hectares (8,800 acres), it consists of smaller forests: the Šaravai Forest, the Sviliai Forest, the Pernarava Forest, the Juodgiris. Most of the forest is drained by the Šušvė tributaries (the Liedas, the Vikšrupis, the Putnupys) while the western part is drained by the Aluona and its tributary the Sakuona.

As of 2005, 50% of the area was covered by birch, 20% by spruce, 8% by aspen, 8% by ash, 4% by oak, 9% by black alder, 1% by grey alder tree groups. The fauna of the forest consists of wild boar, roe deer, moose, red fox, raccoon dog, pine marten, badger, hare, squirrel, beaver, muskrat, as well as hazel grouse, black storks, Eurasian woodcocks, lesser spotted eagles and northern goshawks. Part of the forest belongs to the Pavikšrupys Botanical Zoological Sanctuary. There is a nature monument the Šaravai Oak Tree in the Šaravai Forest.

There are Pavikšrupys, Sviliai, Sviliukai, Degimai, Rugėnai, Būdai, Graužiai, Skaistgiriai, Šaravai, Paaluonys, Vincentava, Kantrimas. villages inside the forest or on its edges.

== Images ==
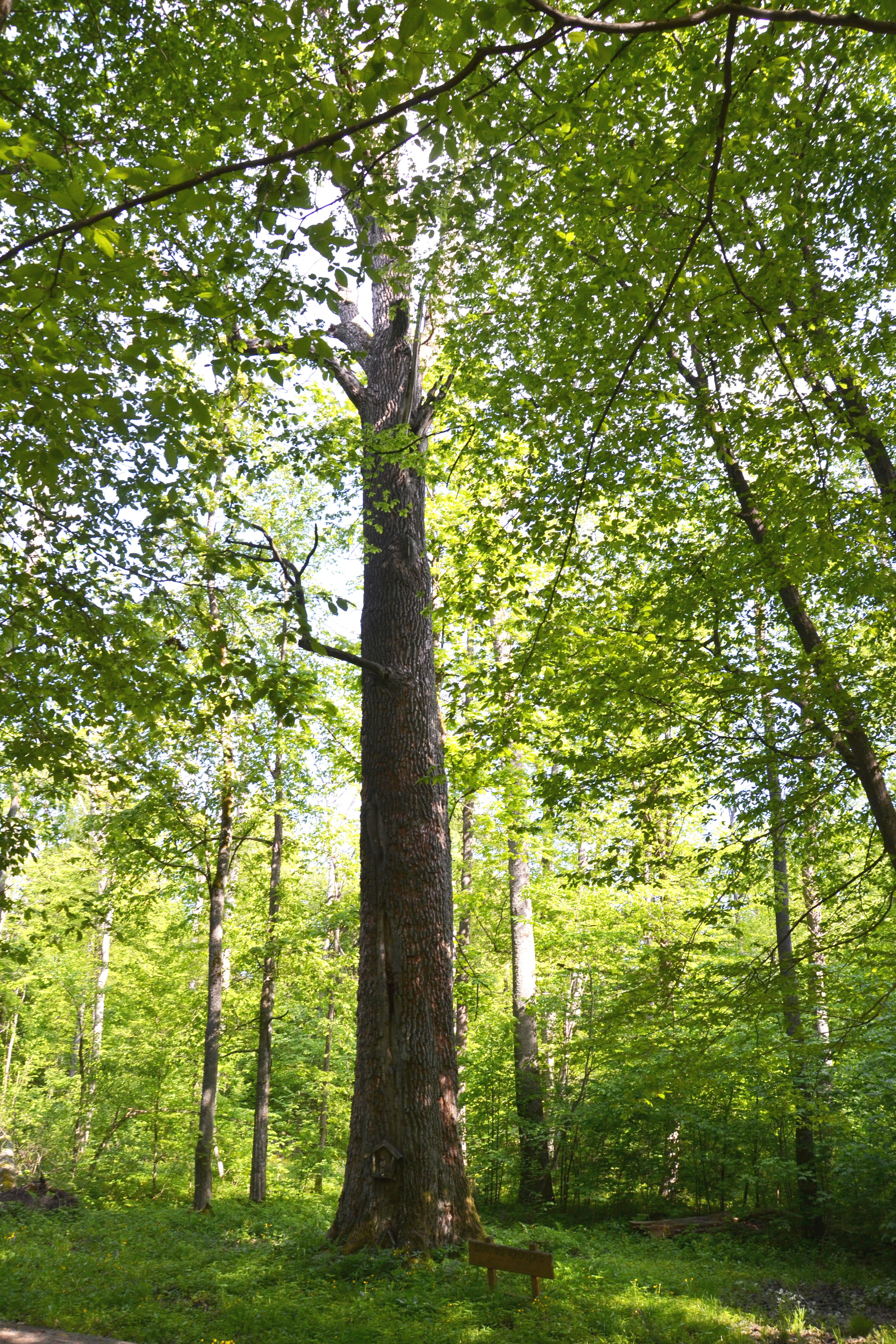
The Šaravai Oak Tree

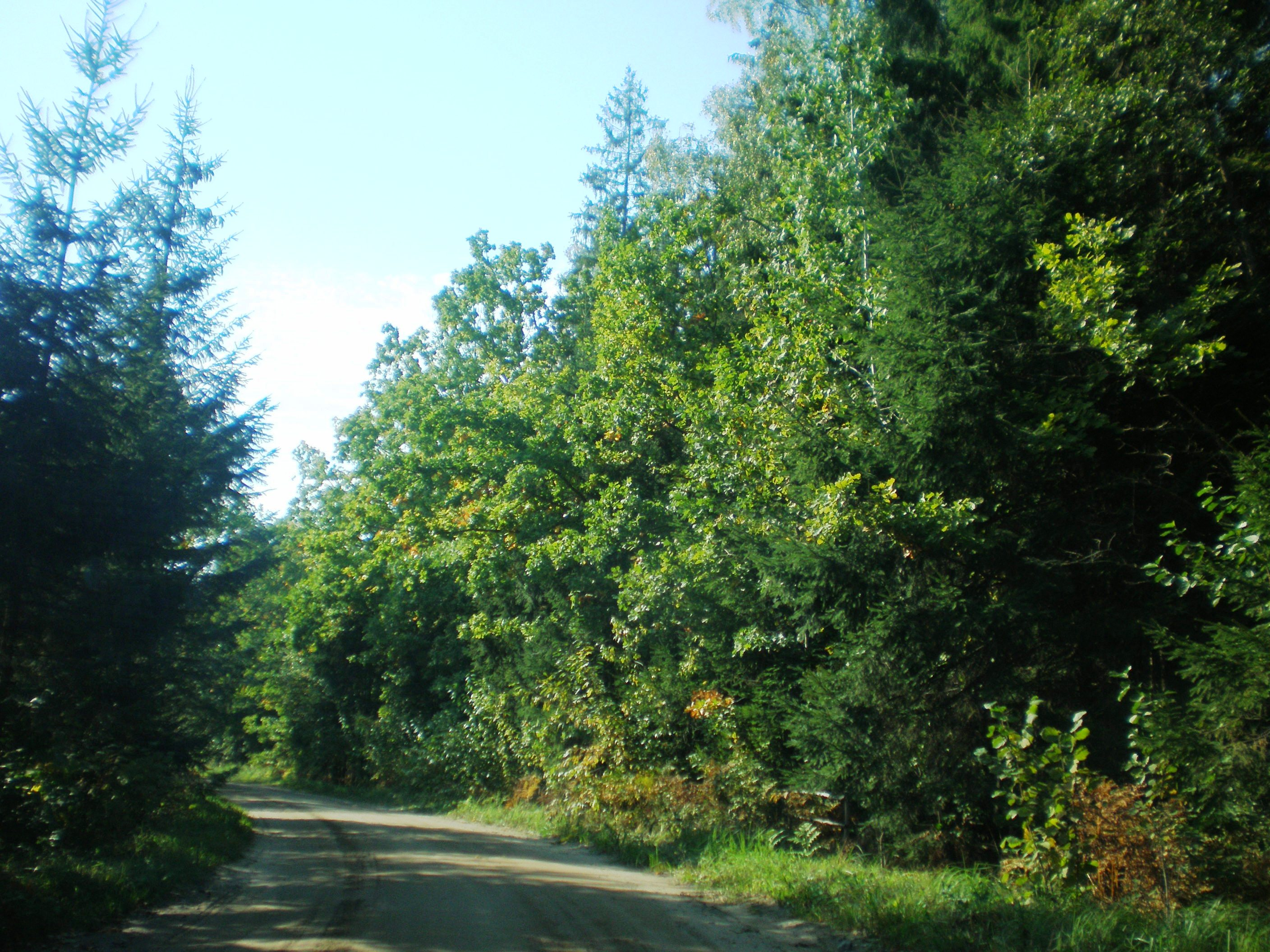
The Sviliai Forest

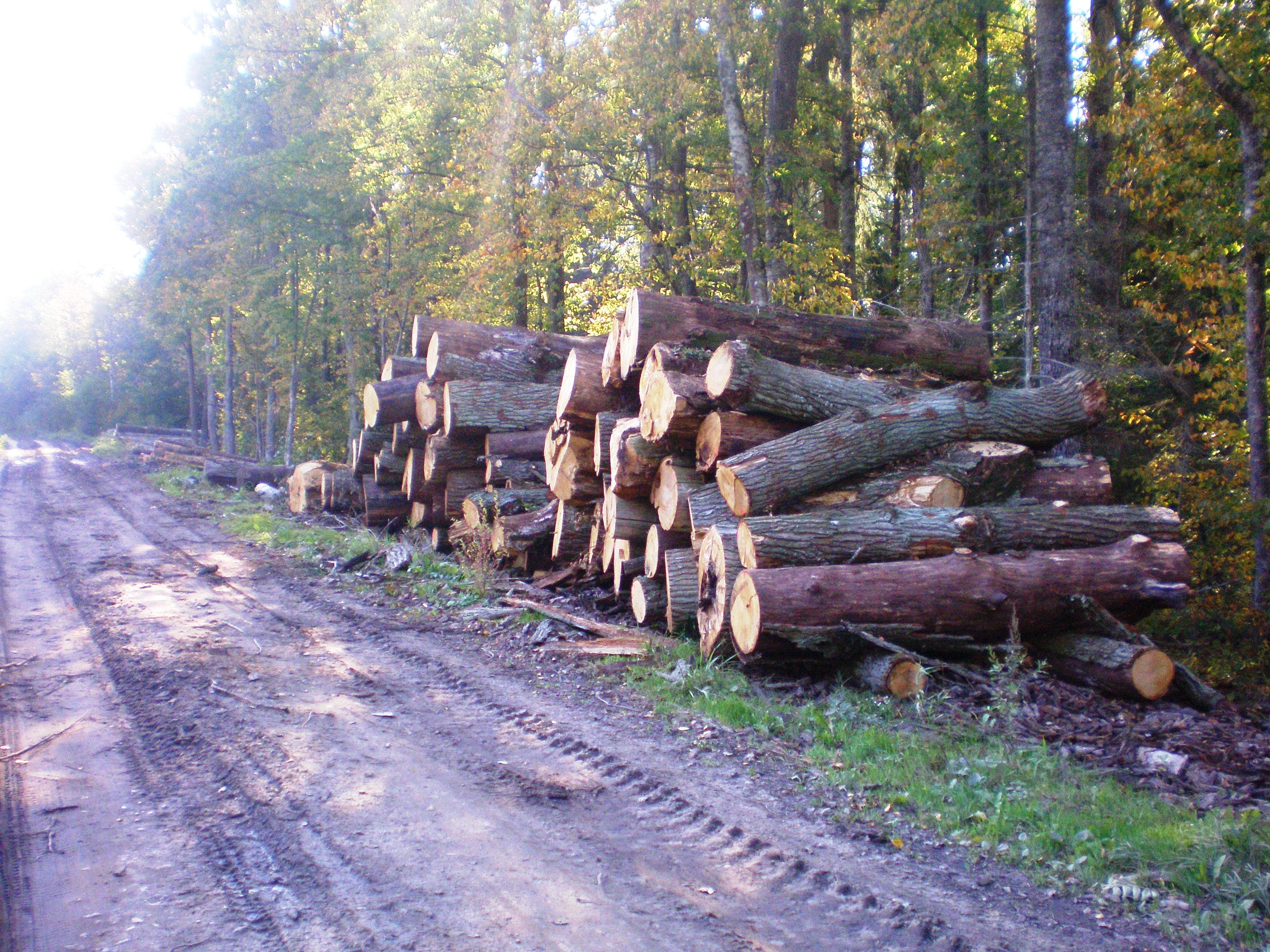
Wood in the Sviliai Forest

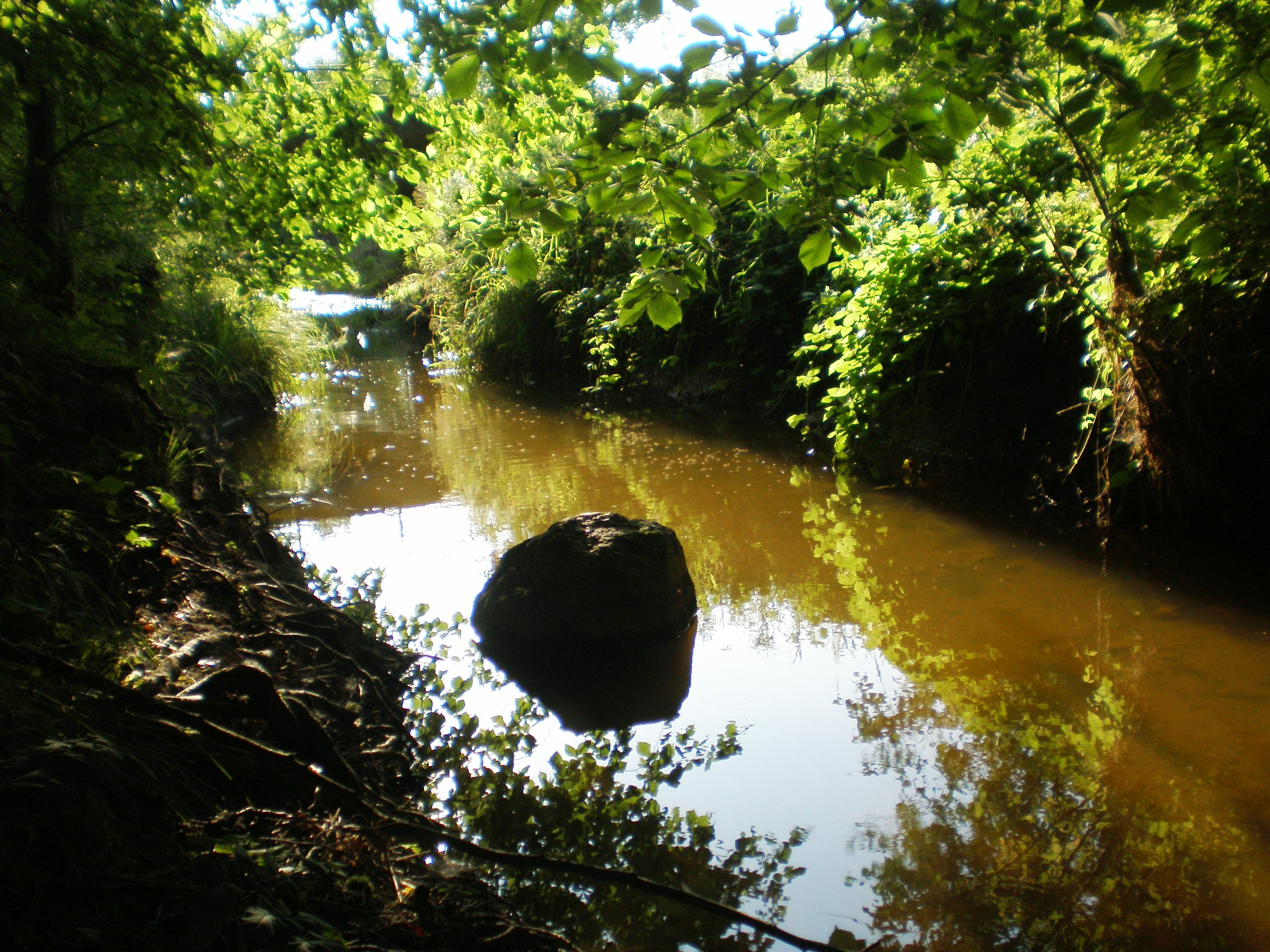
The Aluona river in the Šaravai Forest
