= Kantrimas =

- Village
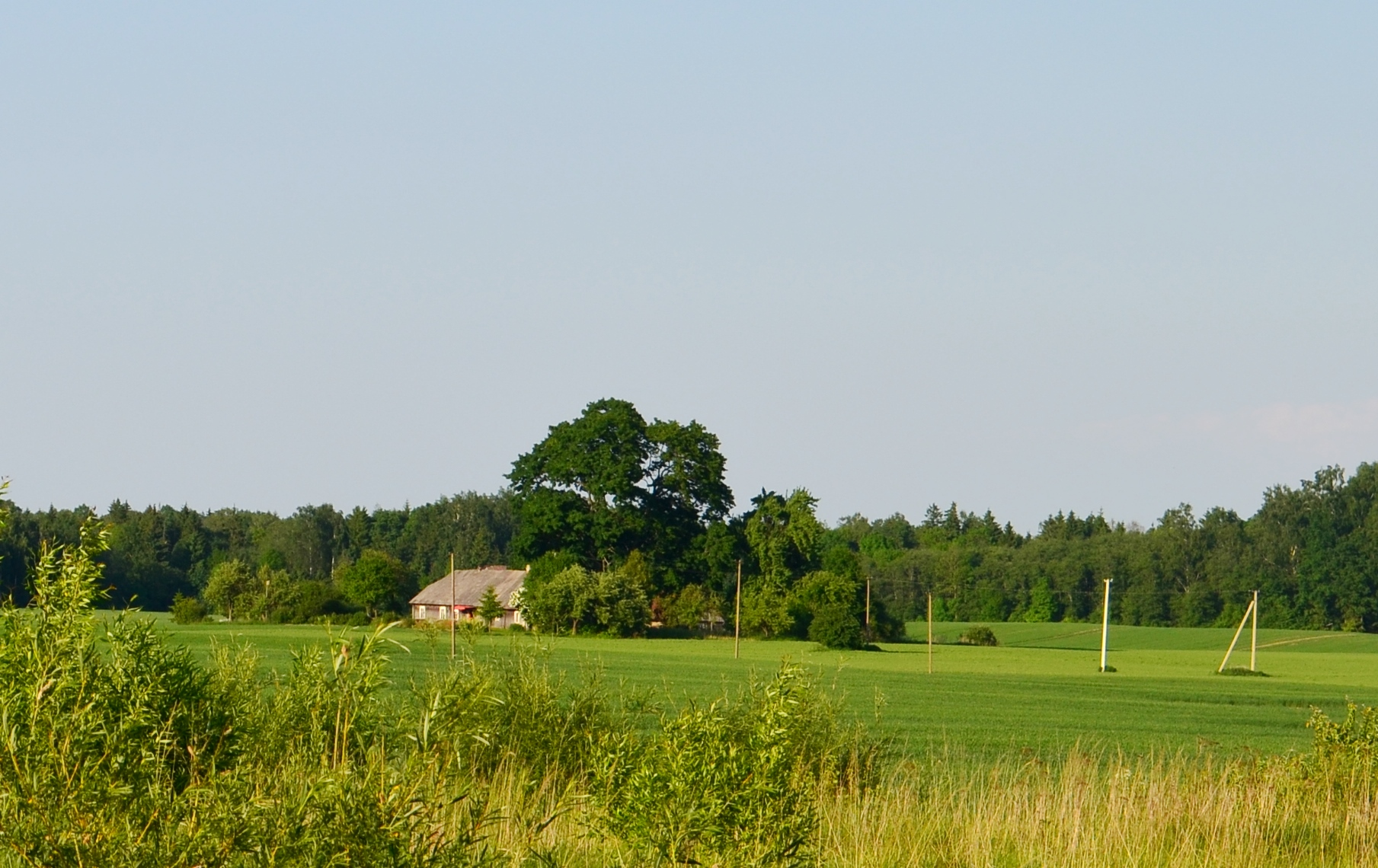

- Location in Lithuania Kantrimas (Lithuania)
- Coordinates: 55°12′00″N 23°38′20″E
- Country: Lithuania
- County: Kaunas County
- Municipality: Kėdainiai district municipality
- Eldership: Pernarava Eldership

Population (2011)
  - Total: 3
- Time zone: UTC+2 (EET)
  - Summer (DST): UTC+3 (EEST)

Kantrimas (Kontrimai, formerly Russian: Контриме, Polish: Kontrymy) is a village in Kėdainiai district municipality, in Kaunas County, in central Lithuania. According to the 2011 census, the village had a population of 3 people. It is located 2 kilometres (1.2 mi) from Paaluonys, by the Leštupys rivulet, alongside the A1 highway, nearby the Pernarava-Šaravai Forest.

There was Kontrimai estate at the beginning of the 20th century.

== Demography ==
Historical population

Year	Pop.	±% p.a.
1902	9	—
1923	17	+3.07%
1959	25	+1.08%
1970	12	−6.45%

Year	Pop.	±% p.a.
1979	9	−3.15%
1989	4	−7.79%
2001	2	−5.61%
2011	3	+4.14%

Source: 1902, 1923, 1959 & 1970, 1979, 1989, 2001, 2011
