= Vincentava =

- Village
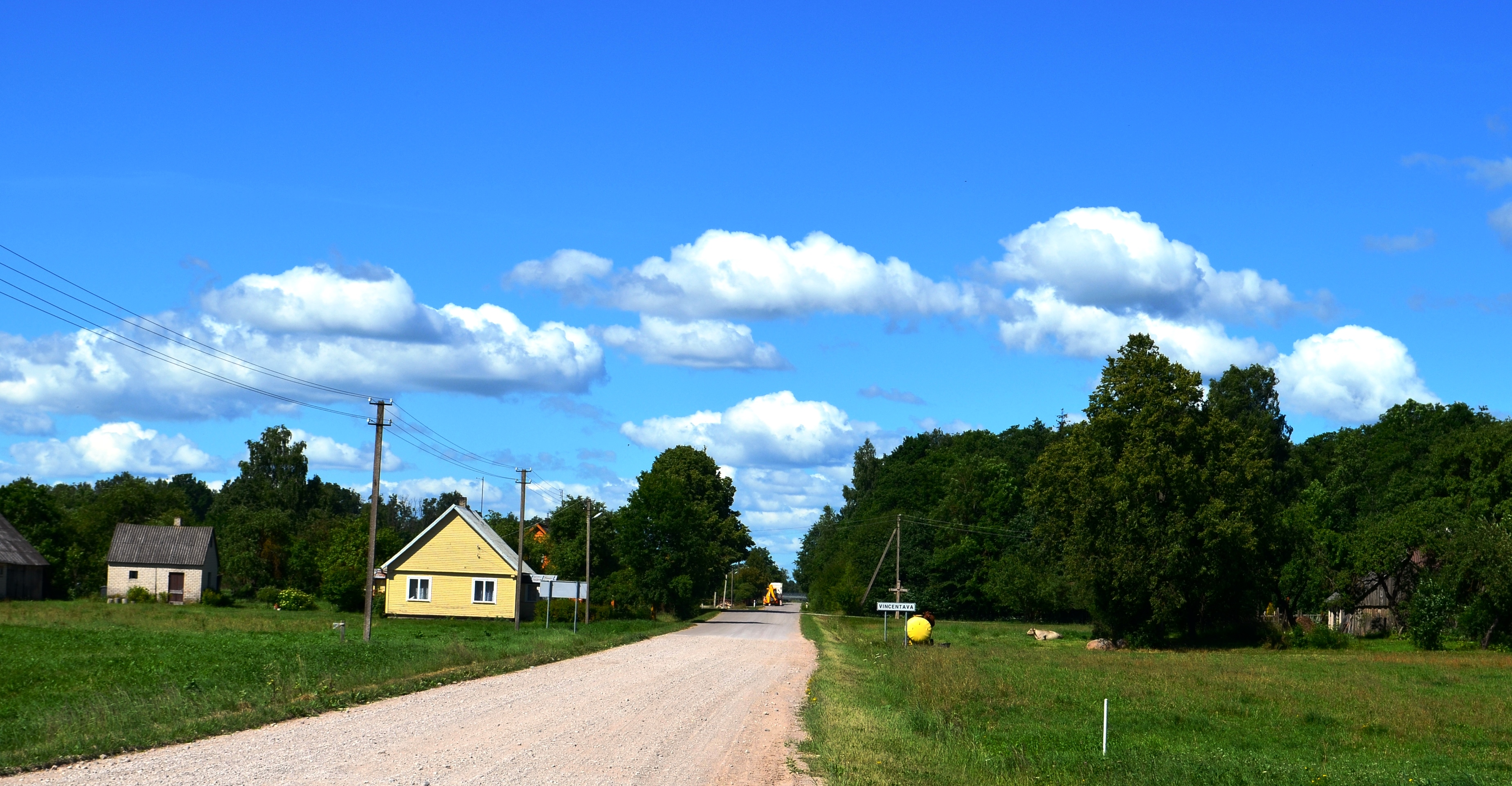

- Location in Lithuania Vincentava (Lithuania)
- Coordinates: 55°11′10″N 23°39′11″E
- Country: Lithuania
- County: Kaunas County
- Municipality: Kėdainiai district municipality
- Eldership: Josvainiai Eldership

Population (2011)
  - Total: 45
- Time zone: UTC+2 (EET)
  - Summer (DST): UTC+3 (EEST)

Vincentava (formerly Russian: Винцентово, Polish: Wincentowo) is a village in Kėdainiai district municipality, in Kaunas County, in central Lithuania. According to the 2011 census, the village had a population of 45 people. It is located 4 kilometres (2.5 mi) from Skaistgiriai, by the Žvaranta river. The Pernarava-Šaravai Forest is located nearby. The A1 highway goes next to Vincentava village.

== History ==
At the end of the 19th century there were three Vincentavas: Vicentava and Būda Vincentava in Ariogala volost and one Vincentava in Vilkija volost. Later Vincentava manor and Vincentava okolica were mentioned. In 1925 Vincentava estate and folwarks were parcelated.

== Demography ==
Historical population

Year	Pop.	±% p.a.
1923	124	—
1959	151	+0.55%
1970	134	−1.08%
1979	80	−5.57%

Year	Pop.	±% p.a.
1989	52	−4.22%
2001	53	+0.16%
2011	45	−1.62%

Source: 1902, 1923, 1959 & 1970, 1979, 1989, 2001, 2011

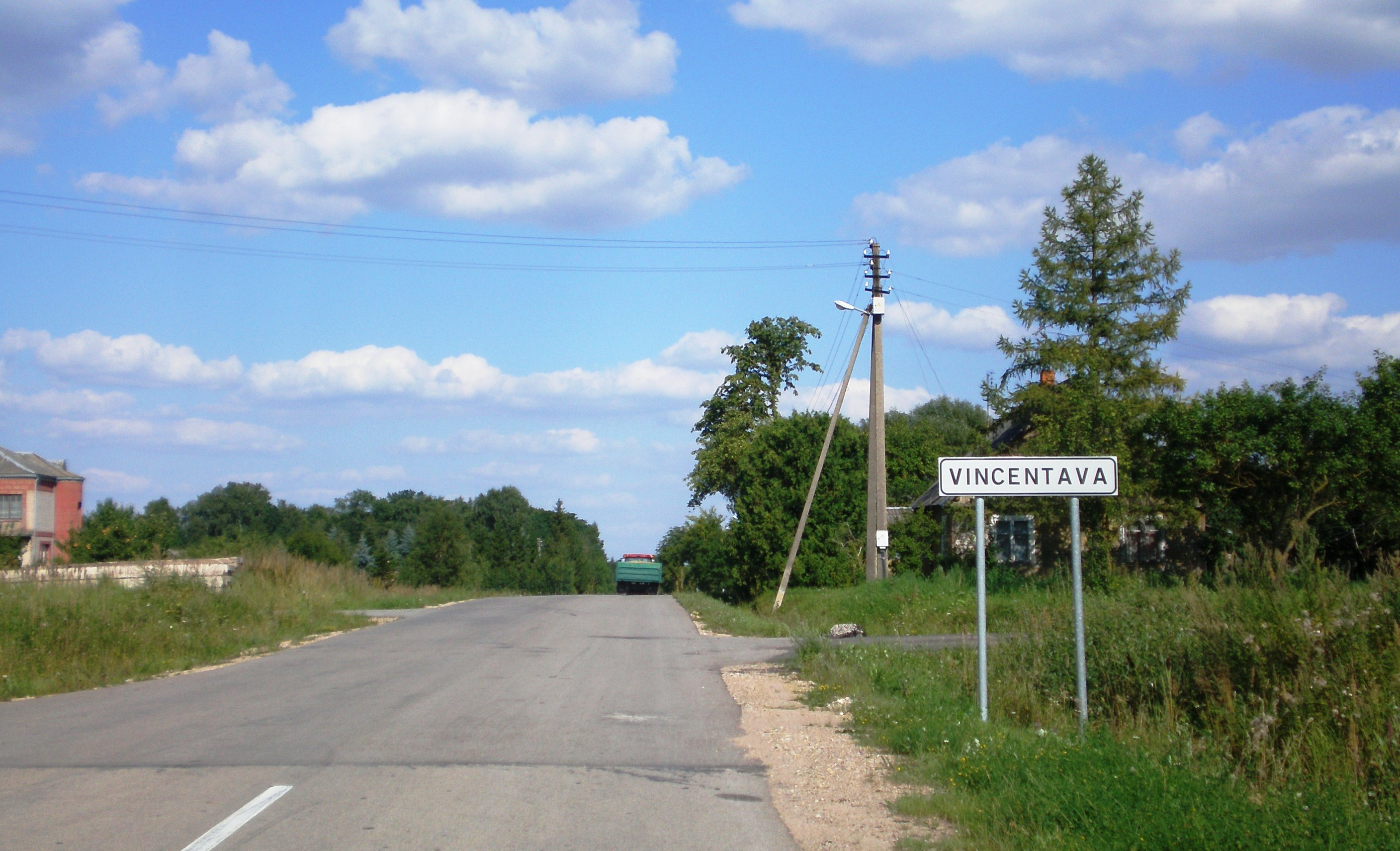
Vincentava roadsign
