= Aluona =

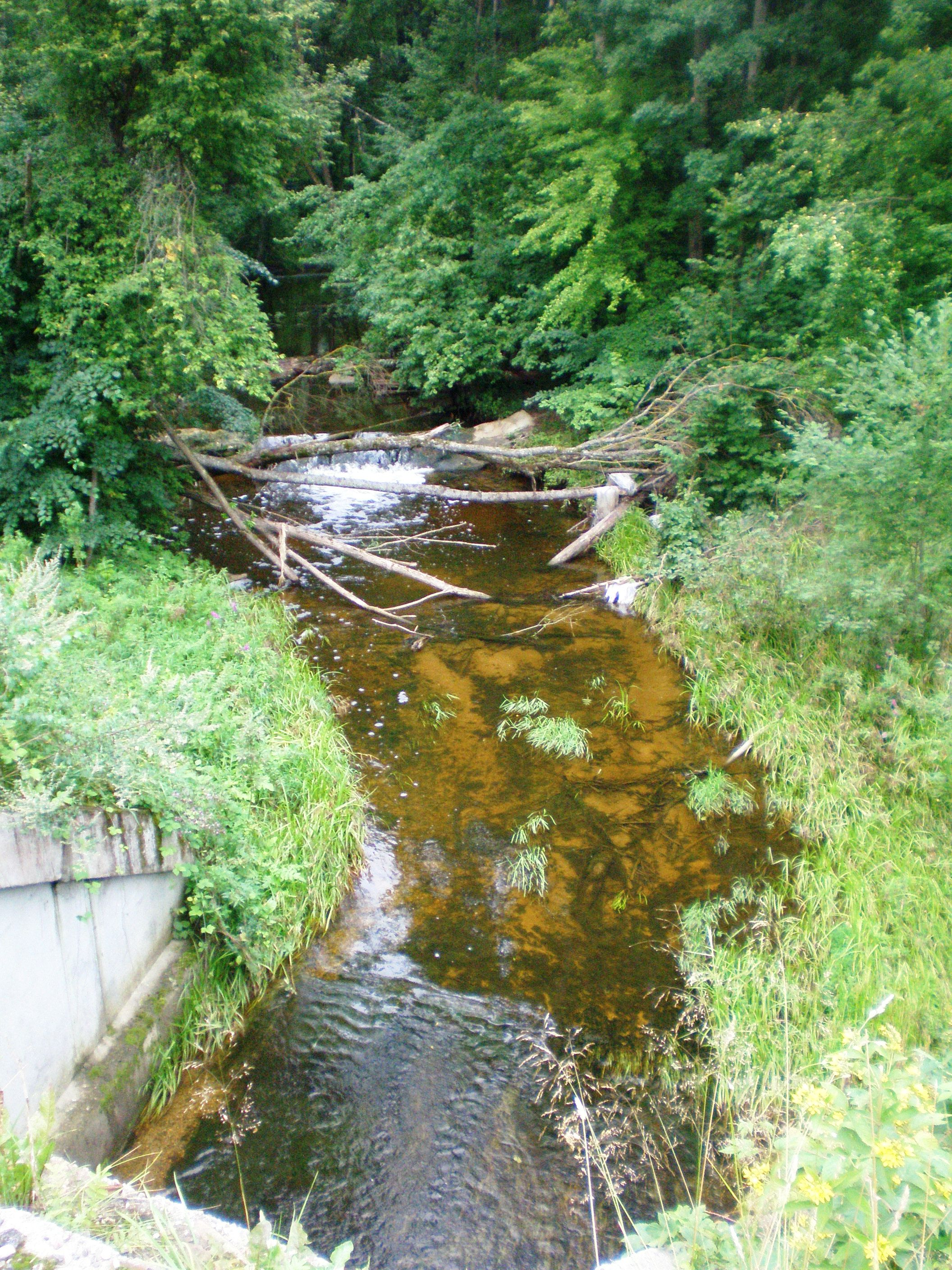
- The lower course of the Aluona

Location
- Country: Lithuania
- Location: Kėdainiai district municipality and Kaunas district municipality, Kaunas County

Physical characteristics
- Source
  - location: Nearby Dratkalnis
- Mouth: Nevėžis in Vitkūnai
  - coordinates: 55°9′12″N 23°48′39″E
- Length: 29.7 km (18.5 mi)
- Basin size: 123.3 km^{2} (47.6 sq mi)
- Discharge
  - average: 0.57 m^{3}/s

Basin features
- Progression: Nevėžis→ Neman→ Baltic Sea
- Tributaries
  - left: Mėlupis, Sakuona I, Sakuona, Kriausupys
  - right: Žąsinas

The Aluona is a river of Kėdainiai district municipality and Kaunas district municipality, Kaunas County, central Lithuania. It flows for 29.7 kilometres and has a basin area of 123.3 km^{2}. It is a right-bank tributary of the Nevėžis river.

It begins near Dratkalnis village, at the border of Kėdainiai district municipality and Raseiniai district municipality. The Aluona flows mostly in a southeastern direction, crossing the Pernarava-Šaravai Forest. The valley of the lower course is deep, the river forms scarps. This section is declared as the Aluona Hydrographical Sanctuary.

The Aluona passes through Paaluonys, Šaravai, Skaistgiriai, Bajėnai I villages.

The hydronym Aluona is derived from the Lithuanian root al- as in the verb alėti ('to flow, to trickle').

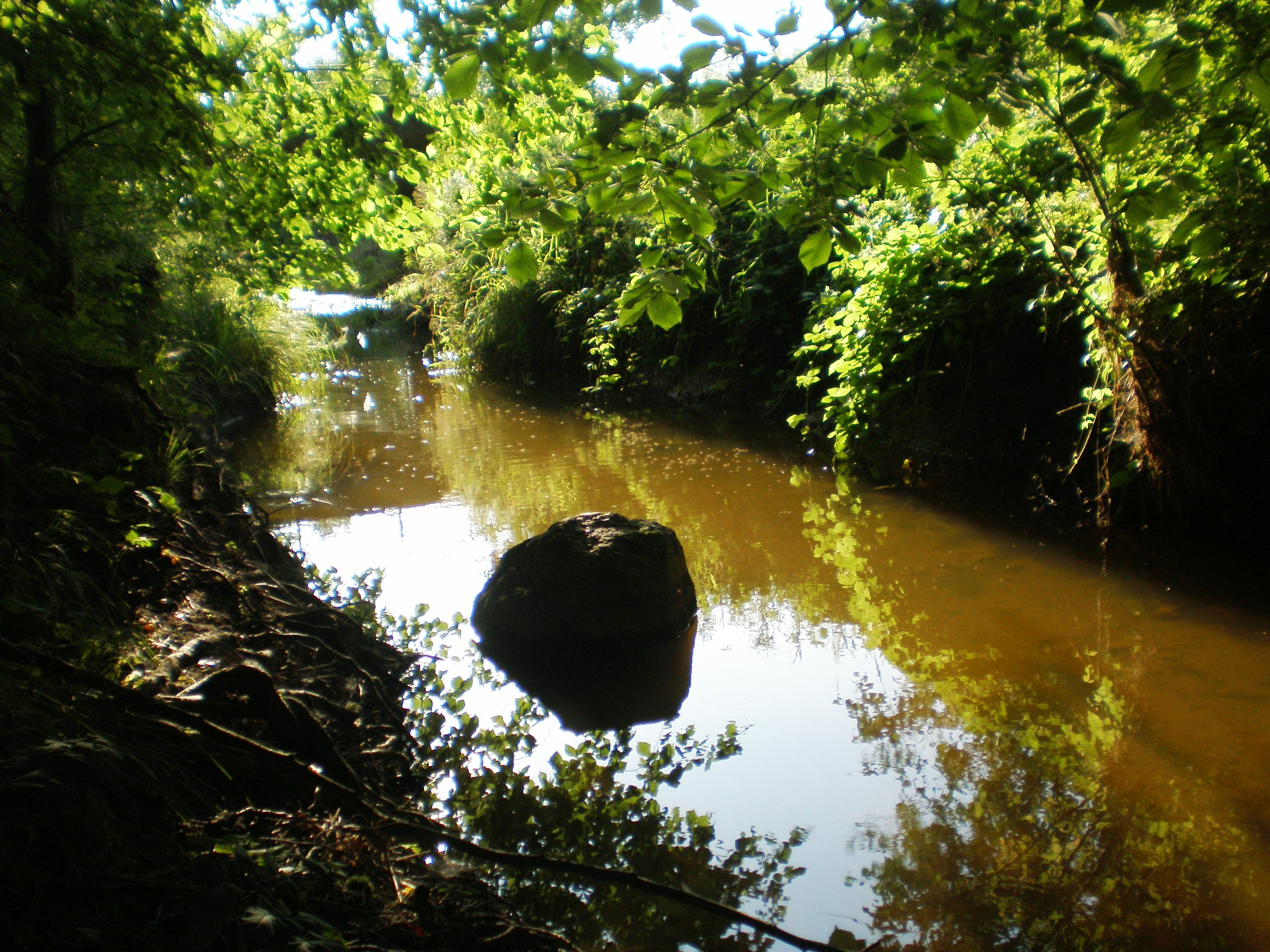
Aluona in the Pernarava-Šaravai Forest
