= Būdai, Josvainiai =

Būdai
- Village
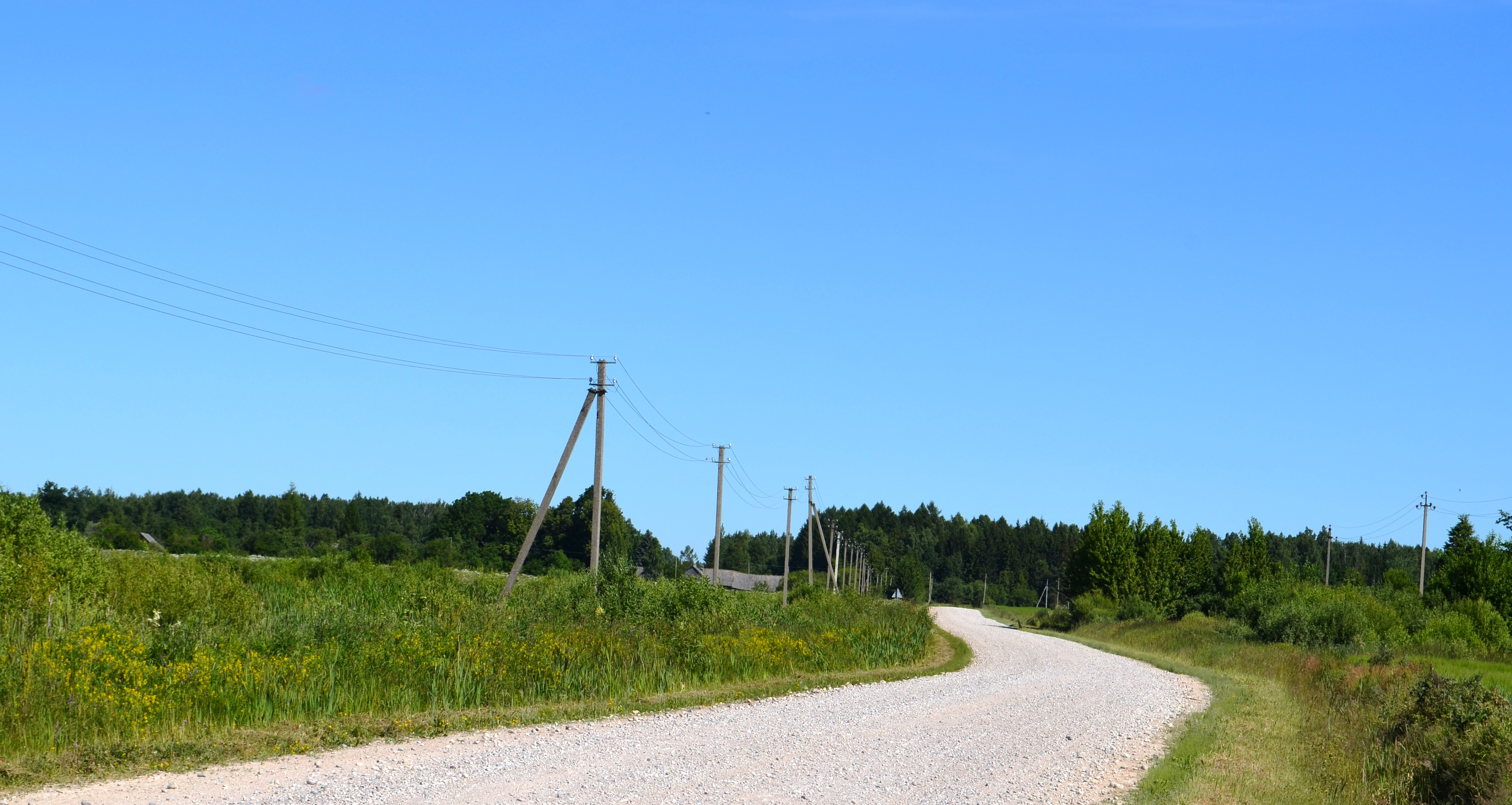

- Location in Lithuania Būdai (Lithuania)
- Coordinates: 55°12′19″N 23°43′52″E
- Country: Lithuania
- County: Kaunas County
- Municipality: Kėdainiai district municipality
- Eldership: Josvainiai Eldership

Population (2011)
  - Total: 7
- Time zone: UTC+2 (EET)
  - Summer (DST): UTC+3 (EEST)

Būdai ('huts, sawmills', formerly Russian: Буда Квятяны, Polish: Budy) is a village in Kėdainiai district municipality, in Kaunas County, in central Lithuania. According to the 2011 census, the village had a population of 7 people. It is located 1 kilometre (0.62 mi) from Skaistgiriai, by the Putnupys river, surrounded by the Pernarava-Šaravai Forest.

== Demography ==
Historical population

Year	Pop.	±% p.a.
1923	12	—
1959	20	+1.43%
1970	19	−0.47%
1979	23	+2.15%

Year	Pop.	±% p.a.
1989	10	−7.99%
2001	6	−4.17%
2011	7	+1.55%

Source: 1902, 1923, 1959 & 1970, 1979, 1989, 2001, 2011

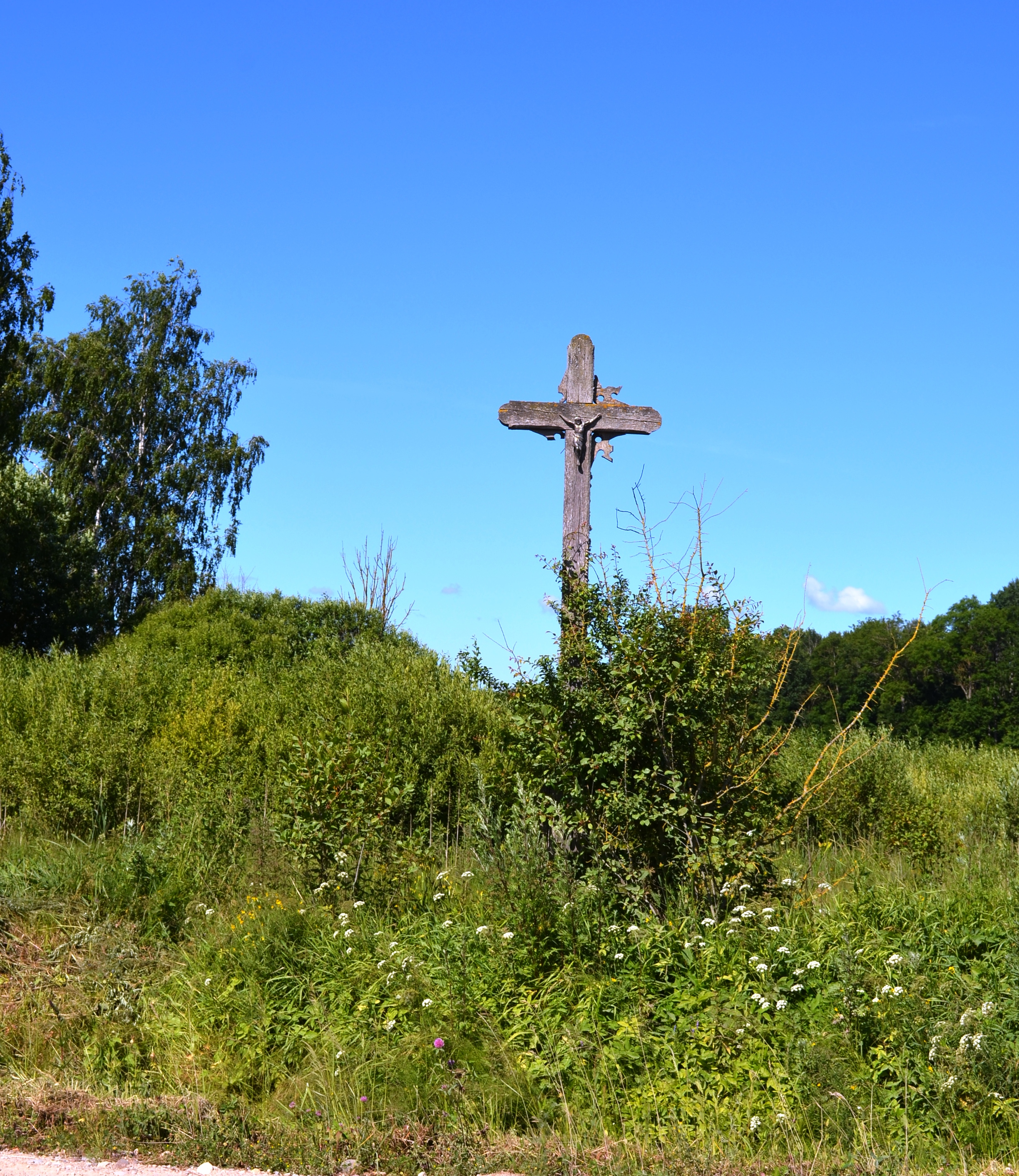
A wooden cross by the crossroad in Būdai
