= Sviliukai =

- Village
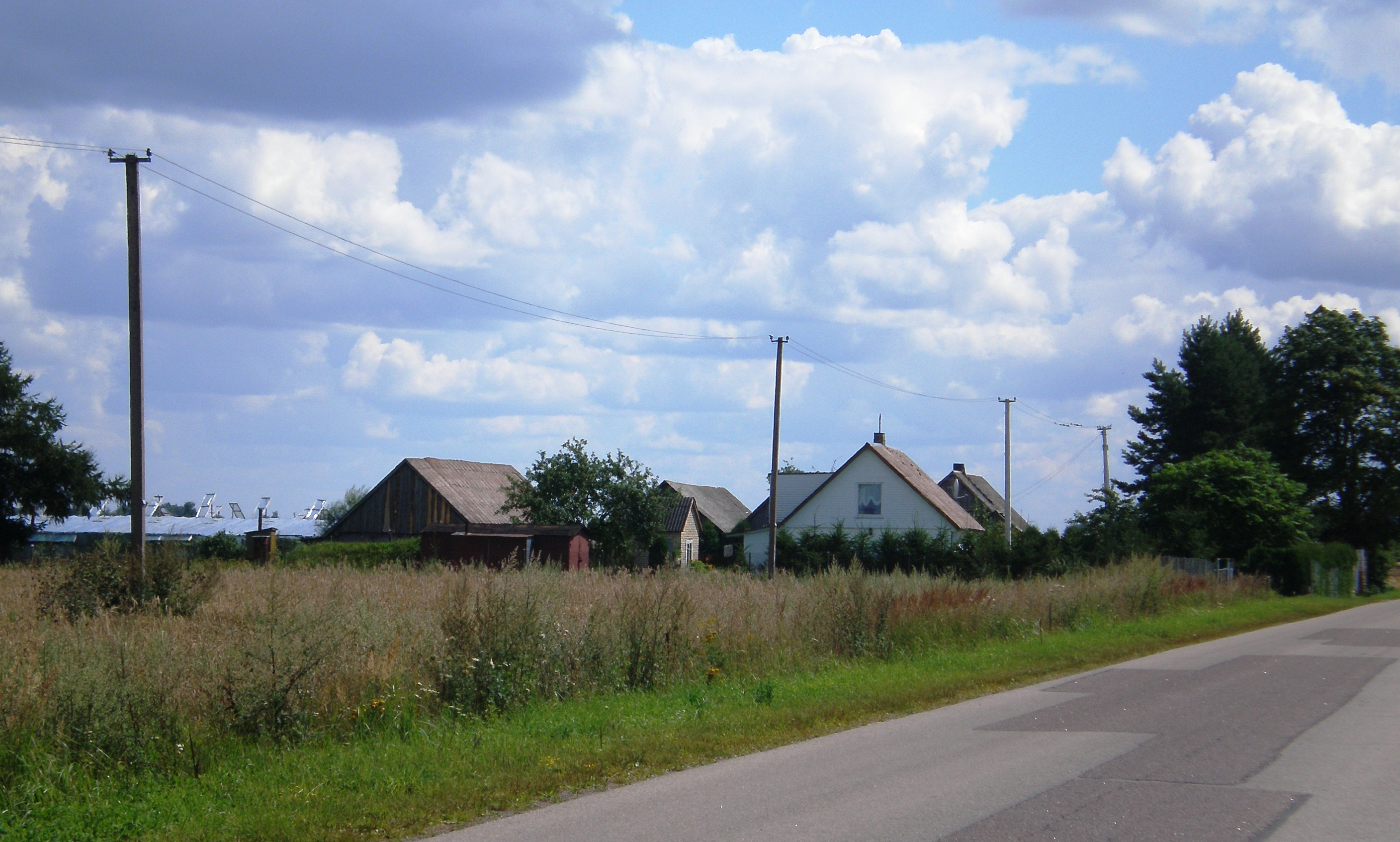

- Location in Lithuania Sviliukai (Lithuania)
- Coordinates: 55°16′08″N 23°46′19″E
- Country: Lithuania
- County: Kaunas County
- Municipality: Kėdainiai district municipality
- Eldership: Josvainiai Eldership

Population (2011)
  - Total: 10
- Time zone: UTC+2 (EET)
  - Summer (DST): UTC+3 (EEST)

Sviliukai (formerly Russian: Свилюки, Polish: Świluki) is a village in Kėdainiai district municipality, in Kaunas County, in central Lithuania. According to the 2011 census, the village had a population of 10 people. It is located 2.5 kilometres (1.6 mi) from Angiriai, by the Josvainiai-Ariogala road, on the right bank of the Šušvė river. The Pernarava-Šaravai Forest is next to Sviliai.

A former manor site is located in Sviliukai, by the Žagrupis rivulet (a cultural heritage object).

== Demography ==
Historical population

Year	Pop.	±% p.a.
1902	54	—
1923	125	+4.08%
1959	127	+0.04%
1970	107	−1.55%

Year	Pop.	±% p.a.
1979	24	−15.30%
1989	16	−3.97%
2001	19	+1.44%
2011	10	−6.22%

Source: 1902, 1923, 1959 & 1970, 1979, 1989, 2001, 2011

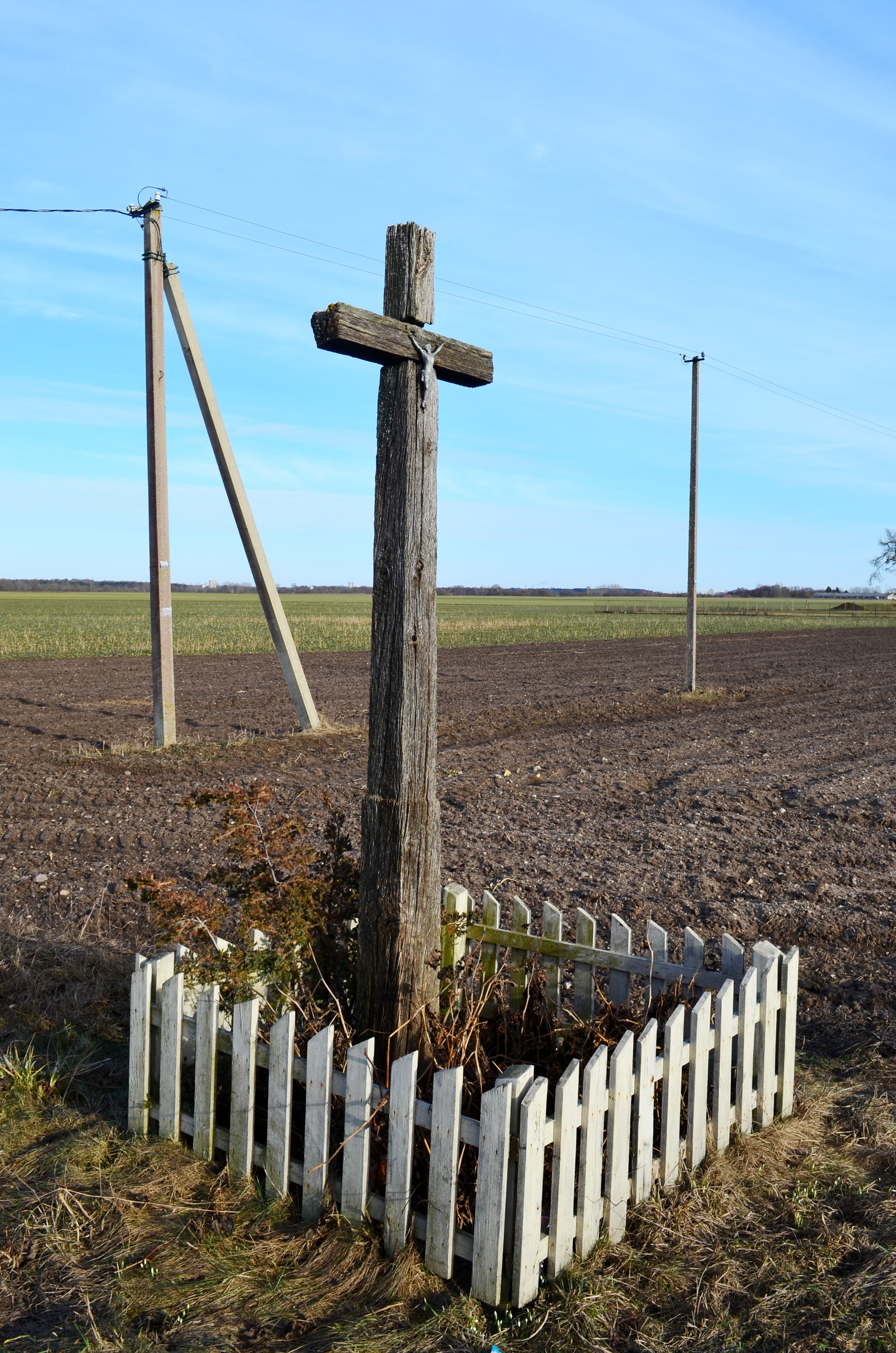
Wooden wayside cross in Sviliukai
