= Sviliai =

- Village
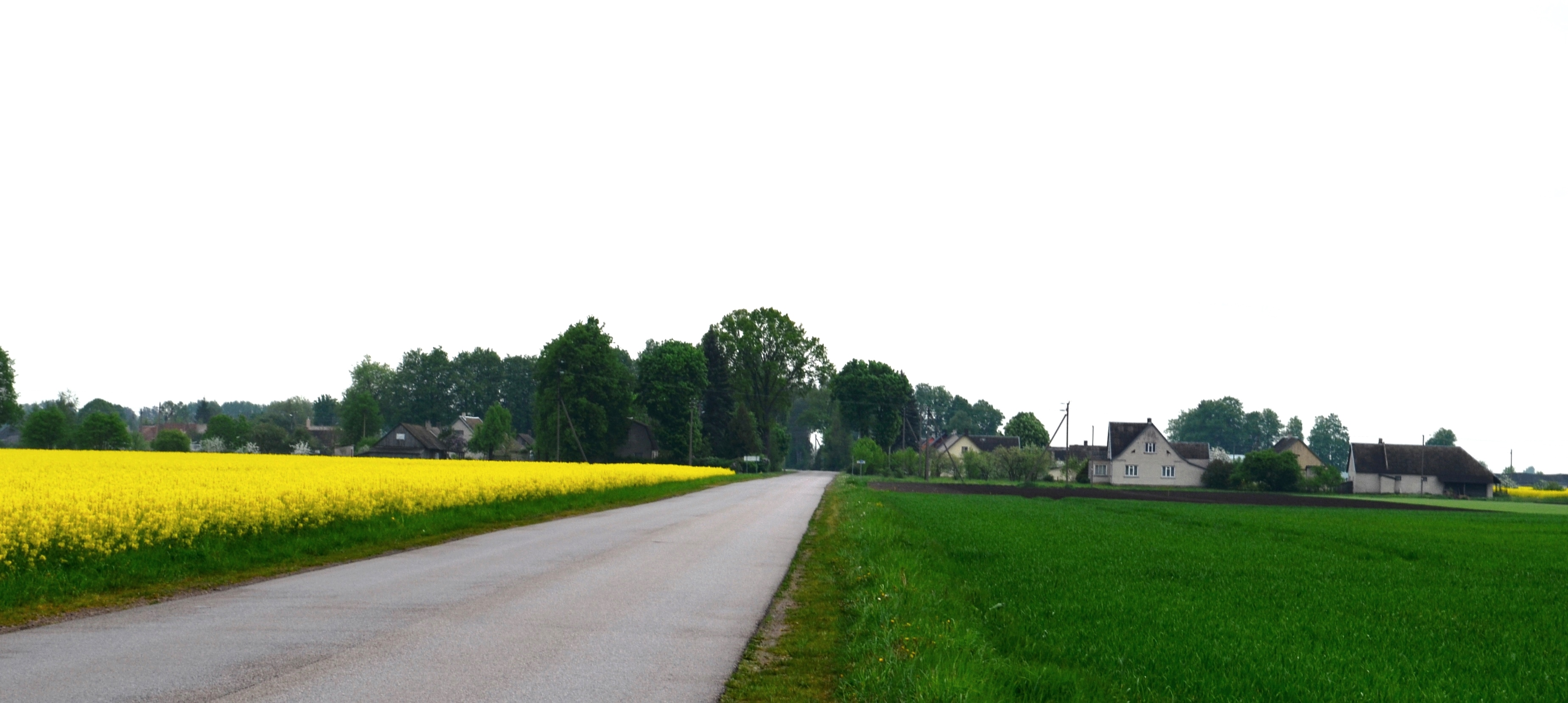

- Location in Lithuania Sviliai (Lithuania)
- Coordinates: 55°15′40″N 23°47′49″E
- Country: Lithuania
- County: Kaunas County
- Municipality: Kėdainiai district municipality
- Eldership: Josvainiai Eldership

Population (2011)
  - Total: 134
- Time zone: UTC+2 (EET)
  - Summer (DST): UTC+3 (EEST)

Sviliai (formerly Russian: Свиле, Polish: Świle) is a village in Kėdainiai district municipality, in Kaunas County, in central Lithuania. According to the 2011 census, the village had a population of 134 people. It is located 4 kilometres (2.5 mi) from Josvainiai, by the Josvainiai-Ariogala road, on the right bank of the Šušvė river. The Pernarava-Šaravai Forest is next to Sviliai.

An ancient burial place and prehistoric settlement site are located in Sviliai area.

== History ==
The village has been known since 1575. There were 13 homesteads in 1820. There was a watermill at the beginning of the 20th century. Sviliai was a property of the Liudkevičiai at that time. During the Soviet era it was a kolkhoz subsidiary settlement.

== Demography ==
Historical population

Year	Pop.	±% p.a.
1902	227	—
1923	161	−1.62%
1959	164	+0.05%
1970	162	−0.11%
1979	255	+5.17%

Year	Pop.	±% p.a.
1987	225	−1.55%
1989	237	+2.63%
2001	175	−2.50%
2011	134	−2.63%

Source: 1902, 1923, 1959 & 1970, 1979, 1989, 2001, 2011

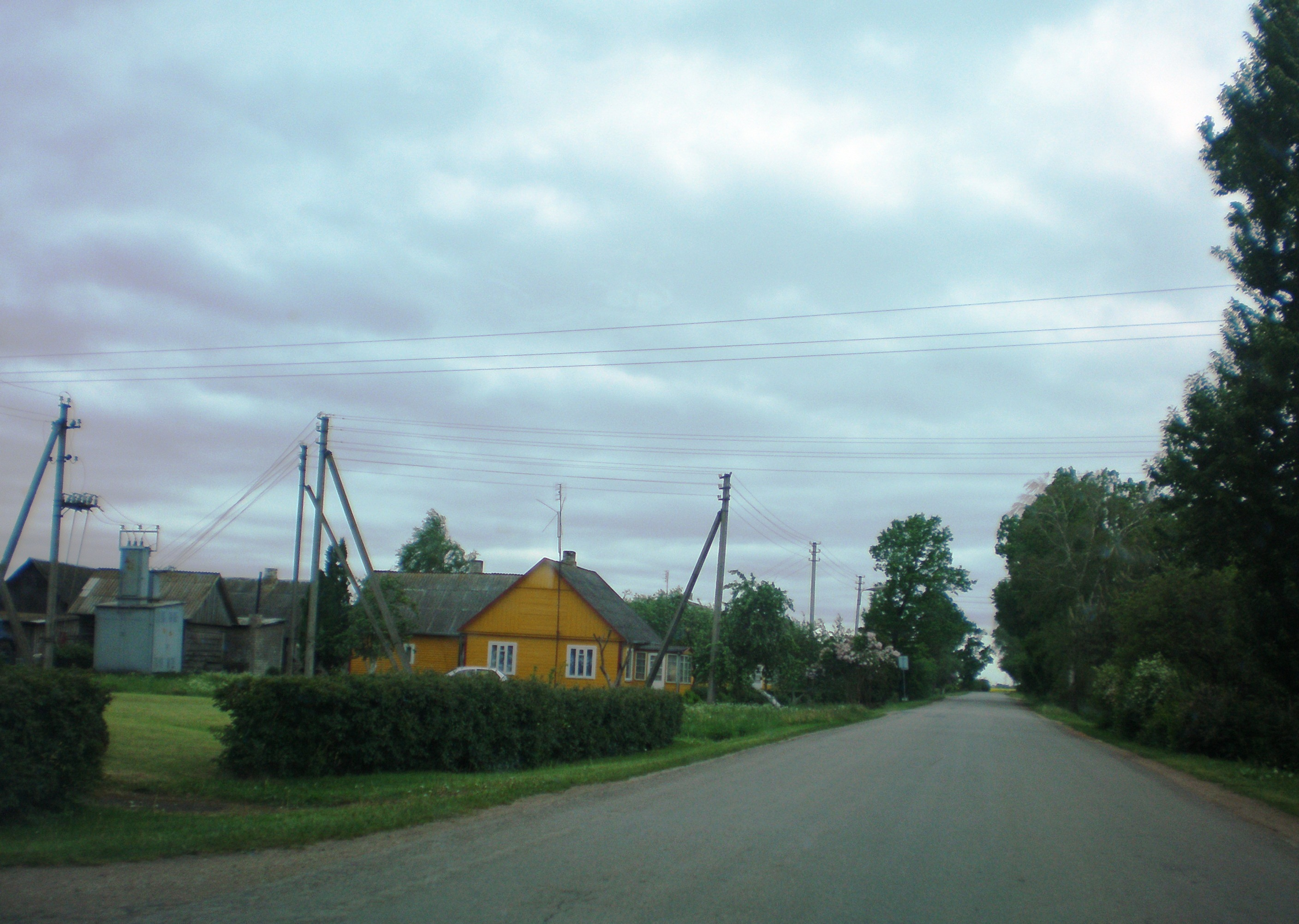
Main street
