= Rugėnai =

- Village
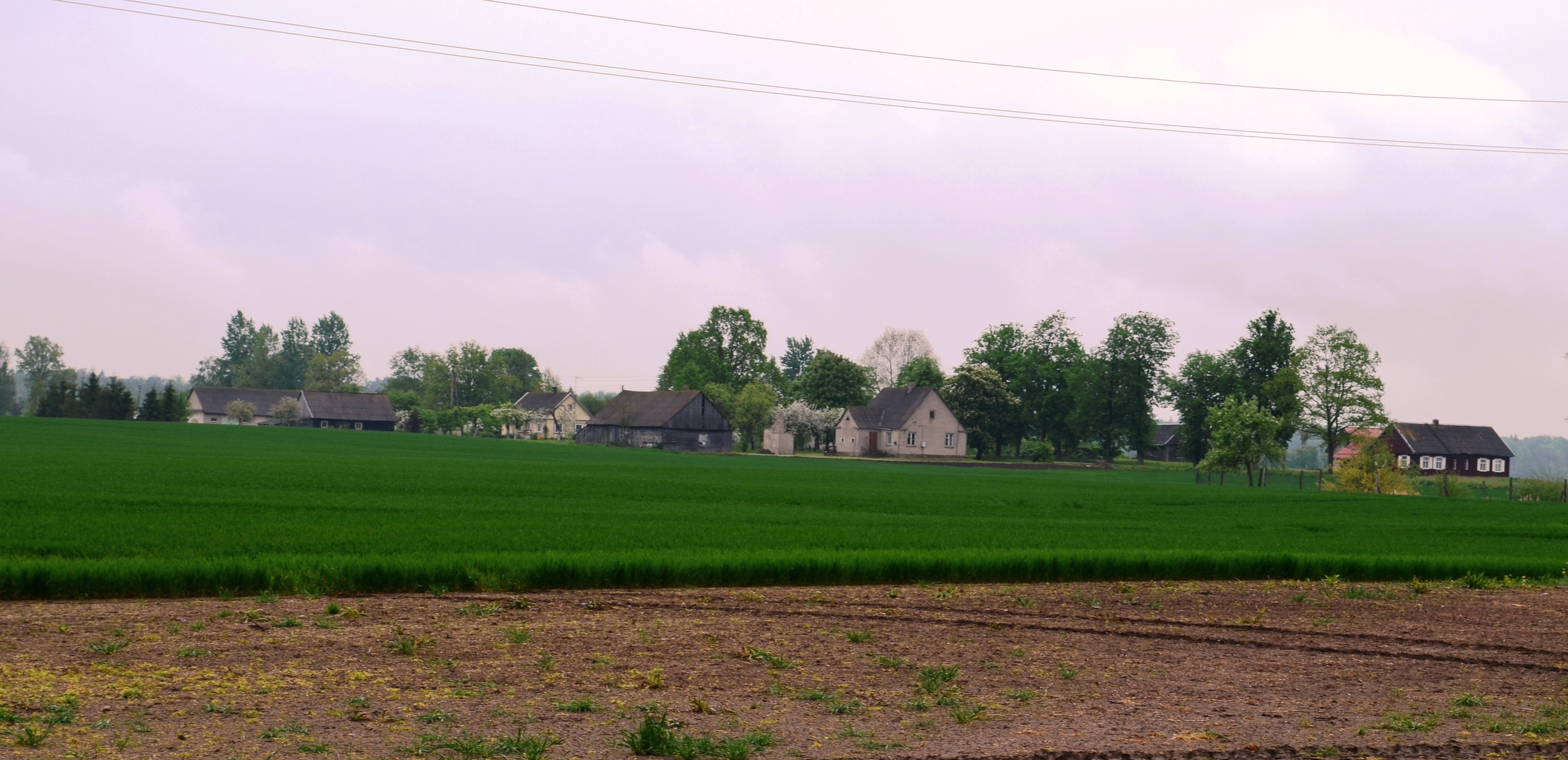

- Location in Lithuania Rugėnai (Lithuania)
- Coordinates: 55°13′52″N 23°42′29″E
- Country: Lithuania
- County: Kaunas County
- Municipality: Kėdainiai district municipality
- Eldership: Pernarava Eldership

Population (2011)
  - Total: 19
- Time zone: UTC+2 (EET)
  - Summer (DST): UTC+3 (EEST)

Rugėnai (formerly Russian: Ругяны, Polish: Rugiany) is a village in Kėdainiai district municipality, in Kaunas County, in central Lithuania. According to the 2011 census, the village had a population of 19 people. It is located 6 kilometres (3.7 mi) from Pernarava, surrounded by the Pernarava-Šaravai Forest. There is a fire brigade.

== History ==
Rugėnai has been known since 1597. It was a selsovet center during 1950–1954. There was a primary school in 1920–1980.

== Demography ==
Historical population

Year	Pop.	±% p.a.
1866	250	—
1902	189	−0.77%
1923	207	+0.43%
1959	178	−0.42%
1970	131	−2.75%

Year	Pop.	±% p.a.
1979	82	−5.07%
1986	48	−7.36%
1989	31	−13.56%
2001	26	−1.46%
2011	19	−3.09%

Source: 1902, 1923, 1959 & 1970, 1979, 1989, 2001, 2011

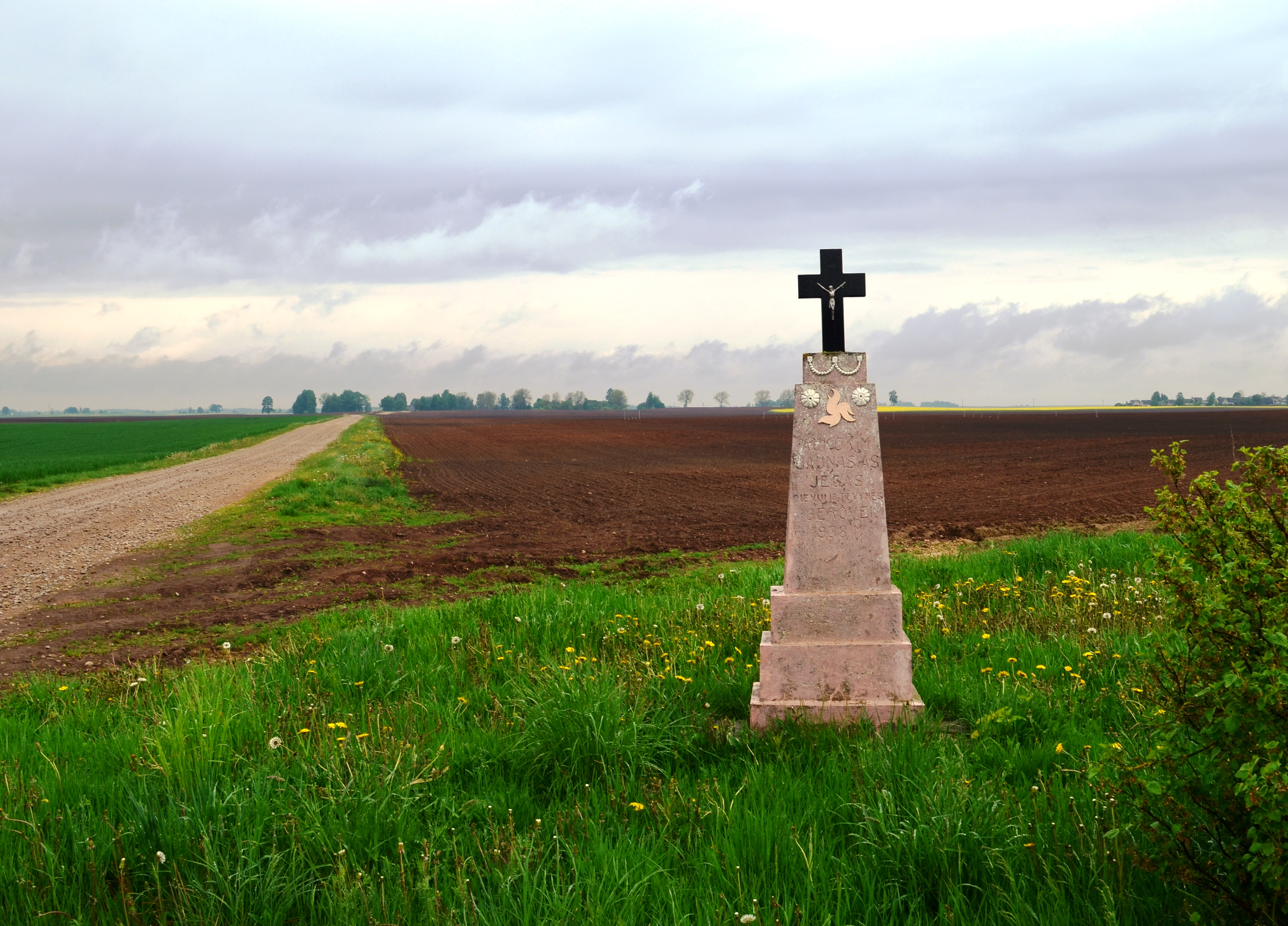
Interwar period cross in Rugėnai
