= Pavikšrupys =

- Village
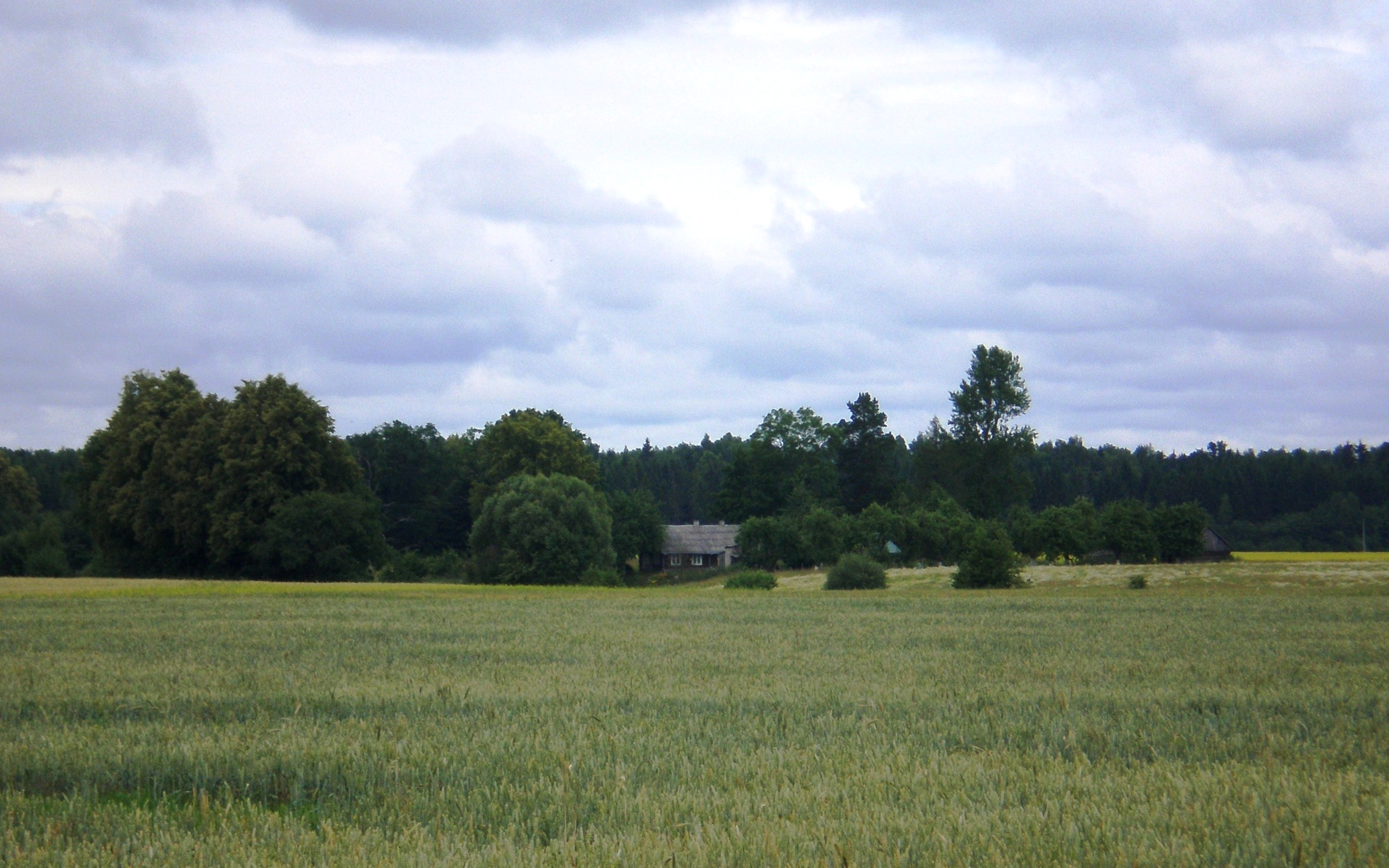

- Location in Lithuania Pavikšrupys (Lithuania)
- Coordinates: 55°13′30″N 23°48′11″E
- Country: Lithuania
- County: Kaunas County
- Municipality: Kėdainiai district municipality
- Eldership: Josvainiai Eldership

Population (2011)
  - Total: 0
- Time zone: UTC+2 (EET)
  - Summer (DST): UTC+3 (EEST)

Pavikšrupys (formerly Russian: Повинкшруписъ, Polish: Powirkszupie) is a village in Kėdainiai district municipality, in Kaunas County, in central Lithuania. According to the 2011 census, the village was uninhabited. It is located 3 kilometres (1.9 mi) from Josvainiai, by the Vikšrupis river, nearby the Pernarava-Šaravai Forest. The Pavikšrupys Botanical Zoological Sanctuary is located next to the village.

== Demography ==
Historical population

Year	Pop.	±% p.a.
1902	14	—
1923	81	+8.72%
1959	46	−1.56%
1970	22	−6.49%

Year	Pop.	±% p.a.
1979	12	−6.51%
1989	4	−10.40%
2001	0	−100.00%
2011	0	0.00%

Source: 1902, 1923, 1959 & 1970, 1979, 1989, 2001, 2011
