= Dratkalnis =

- Village
- Location in Lithuania Dratkalnis (Lithuania)
- Coordinates: 55°12′50″N 23°34′19″E
- Country: Lithuania
- County: Kaunas County
- Municipality: Kėdainiai district municipality
- Eldership: Pernarava Eldership

Population (2011)
  - Total: 0
- Time zone: UTC+2 (EET)
  - Summer (DST): UTC+3 (EEST)

Dratkalnis (formerly Russian: Драткольне, Polish: Dratkolnie) is a village in Kėdainiai district municipality, in Kaunas County, in central Lithuania. According to the 2011 census, the village was uninhabited. It is located 2 kilometres (1.2 mi) from Paaluonys, nearby the A1 highway on the border of Raseiniai district municipality.

It was an estate of the Römer family at the beginning of the 20th century.

== Demography ==
Historical population

Year	Pop.	±% p.a.
1902	30	—
1923	21	−1.68%
1959	46	+2.20%
1970	27	−4.73%

Year	Pop.	±% p.a.
1979	18	−4.41%
1989	0	−100.00%
2001	0	0.00%
2011	0	0.00%

Source: 1902, 1923, 1959 & 1970, 1979, 1989, 2001, 2011
