= Šaravai =

- Village
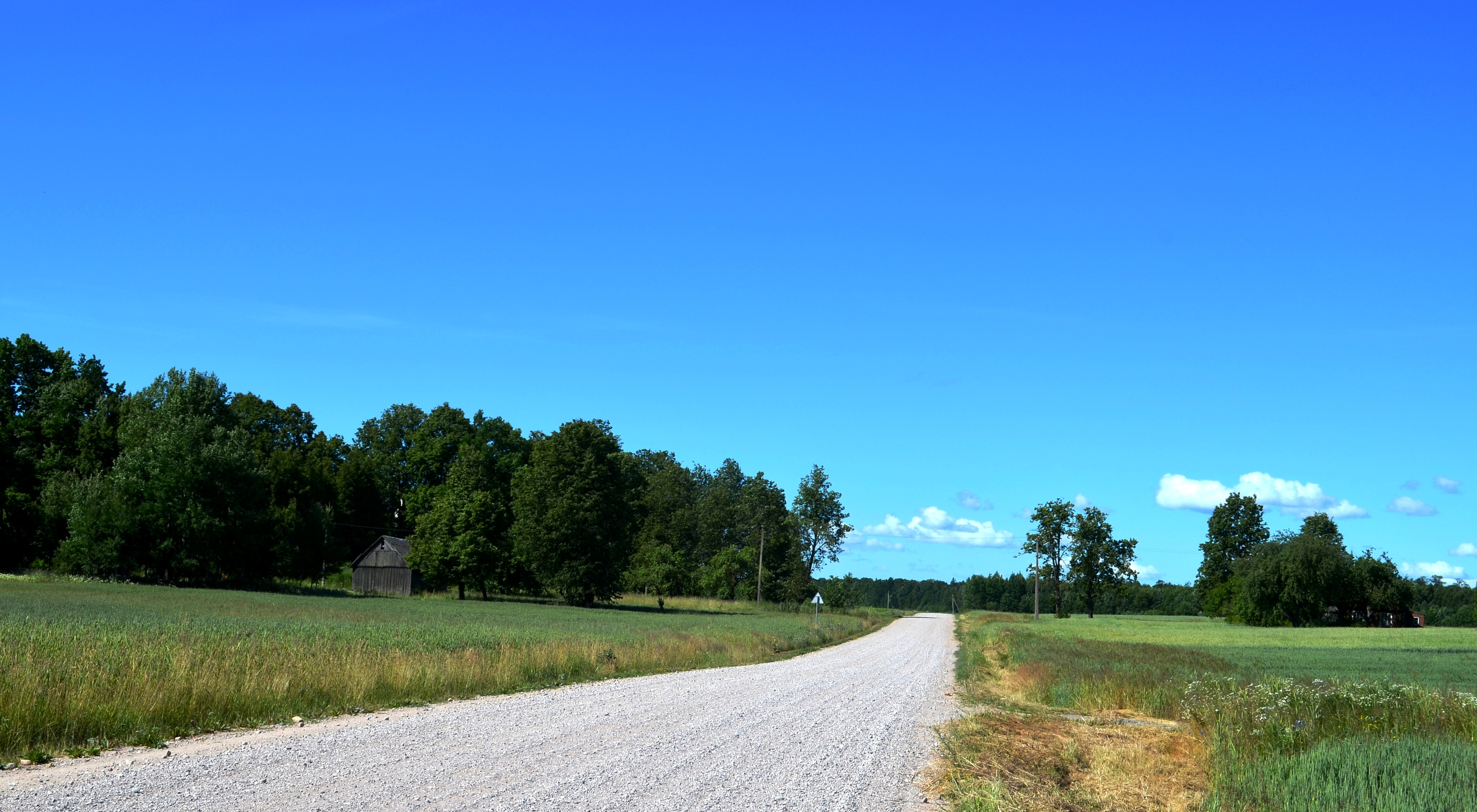

- Location in Lithuania Šaravai (Lithuania)
- Coordinates: 55°11′31″N 23°42′00″E
- Country: Lithuania
- County: Kaunas County
- Municipality: Kėdainiai district municipality
- Eldership: Josvainiai Eldership

Population (2011)
  - Total: 25
- Time zone: UTC+2 (EET)
  - Summer (DST): UTC+3 (EEST)

Šaravai (formerly Russian: Шаравы, Polish: Szarawy) is a village in Kėdainiai district municipality, in Kaunas County, in central Lithuania. According to the 2011 census, the village had a population of 25 people. It is located 2 kilometres (1.2 mi) from Skaistgiriai, by the Aluona river, surrounded by the Pernarava-Šaravai Forest. There are wooden Catholic church of Jesus Heart (built in 1933), burial place of the January Uprising victims. The Šaravai Oak Tree (a nature monument) is located nearby Šaravai village.

== History ==
There was the Šaravai manor once. During the January Uprising insurgents used to gather under the Šaravai Oak Tree where they attended to the Mass. Once they there surrounded by Tsarist soldiers and many of them were killed. Conversely to most of Kaunas-Kėdainiai region (known as the Liauda) Šaravai was not polonized at the end of the 19th century.

== Demography ==
Historical population

Year	Pop.	±% p.a.
1902	255	—
1923	163	−2.11%
1959	175	+0.20%
1970	111	−4.05%

Year	Pop.	±% p.a.
1979	60	−6.61%
1989	28	−7.34%
2001	22	−1.99%
2011	25	+1.29%

Source: 1902, 1923, 1959 & 1970, 1979, 1989, 2001, 2011

== Images ==
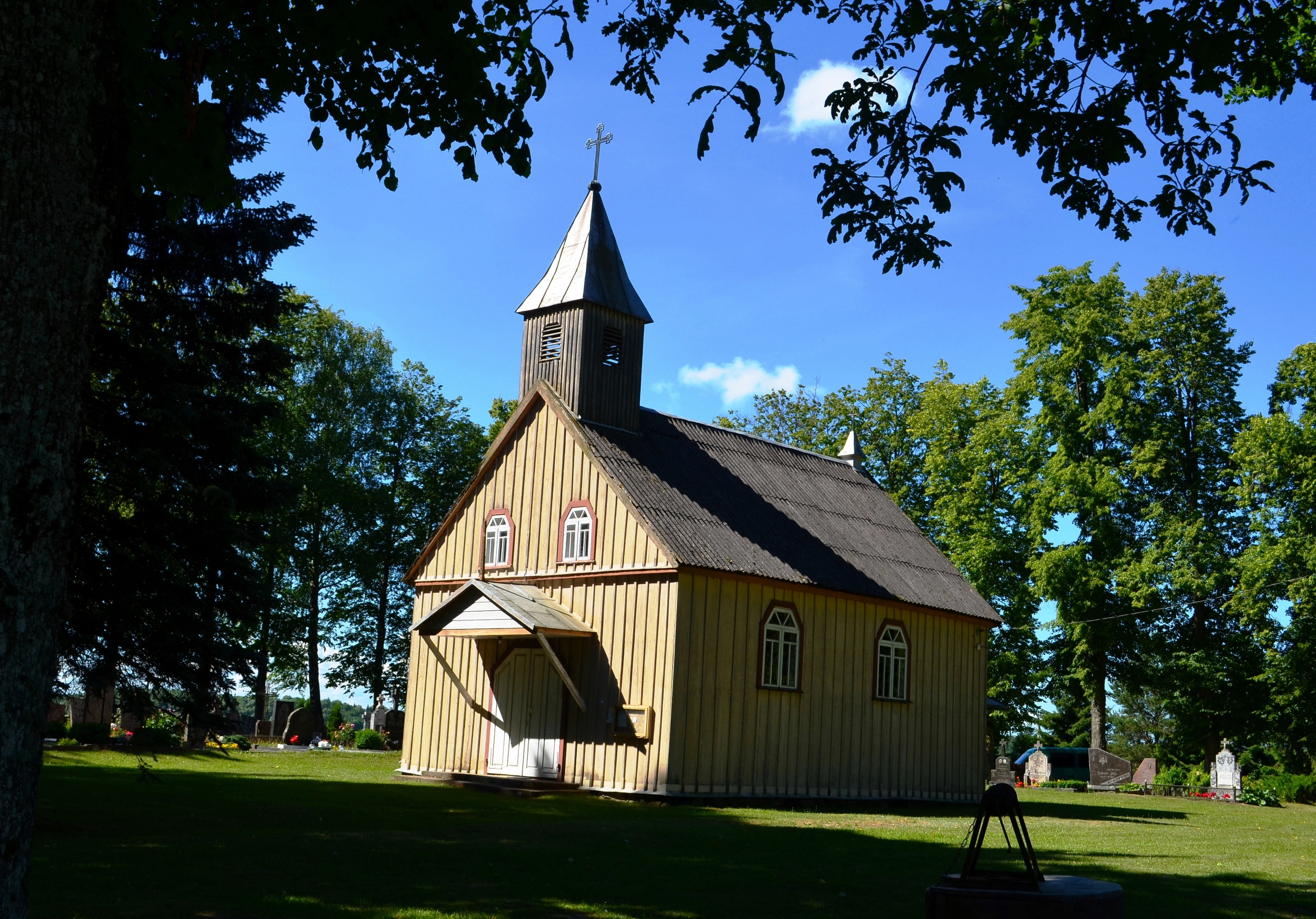
Šaravai church

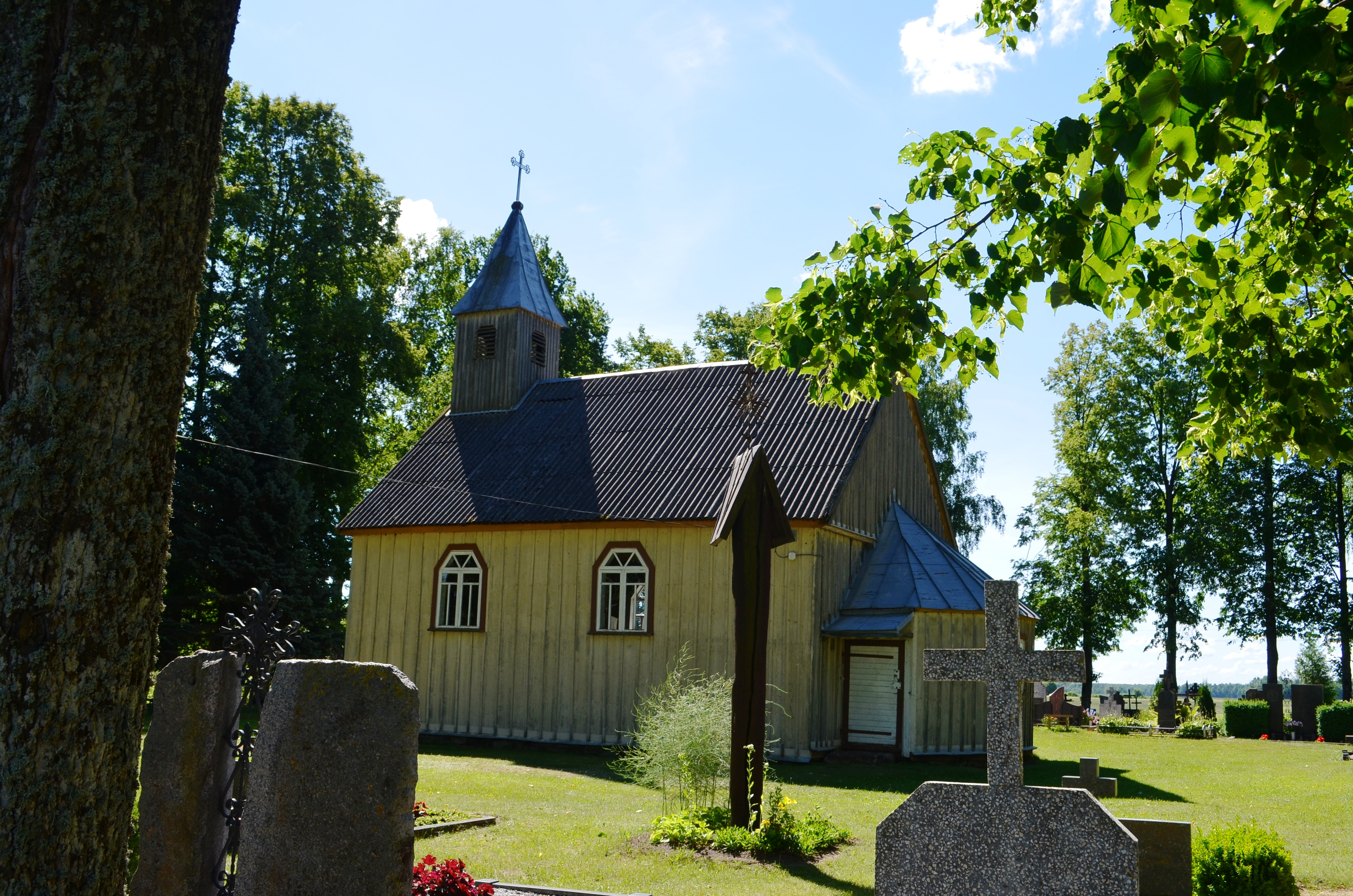
Šaravai church and graveyard

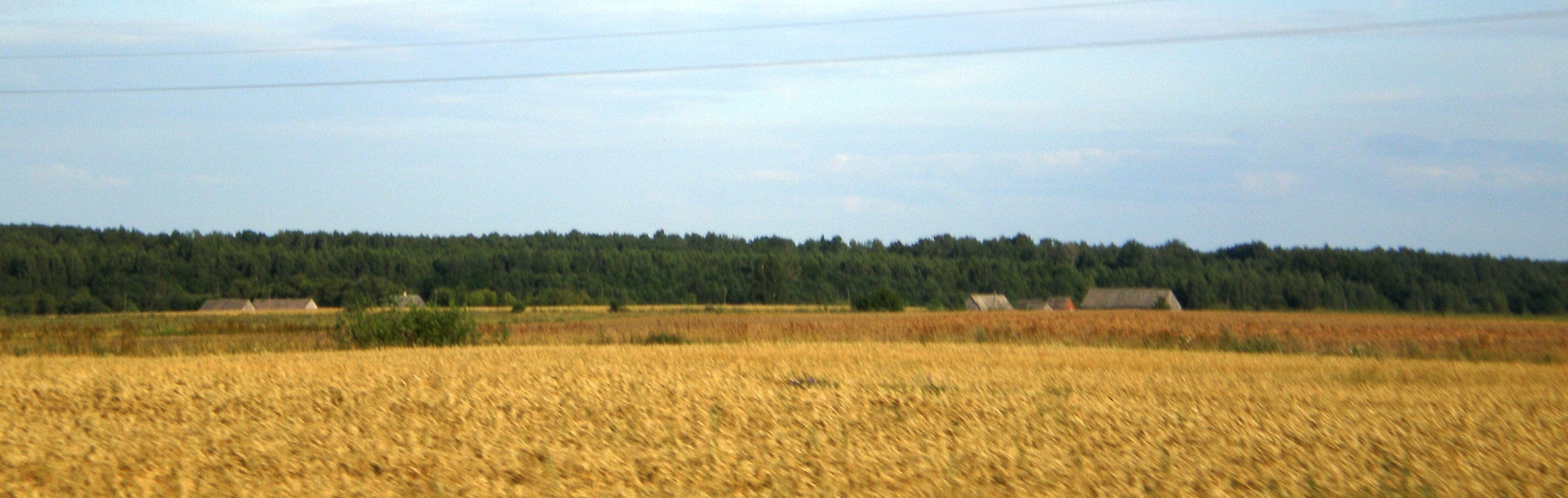
Pernarava-Šaravai Forest around
