= Skaistgiriai, Kėdainiai =

Skaistgiriai
- Village
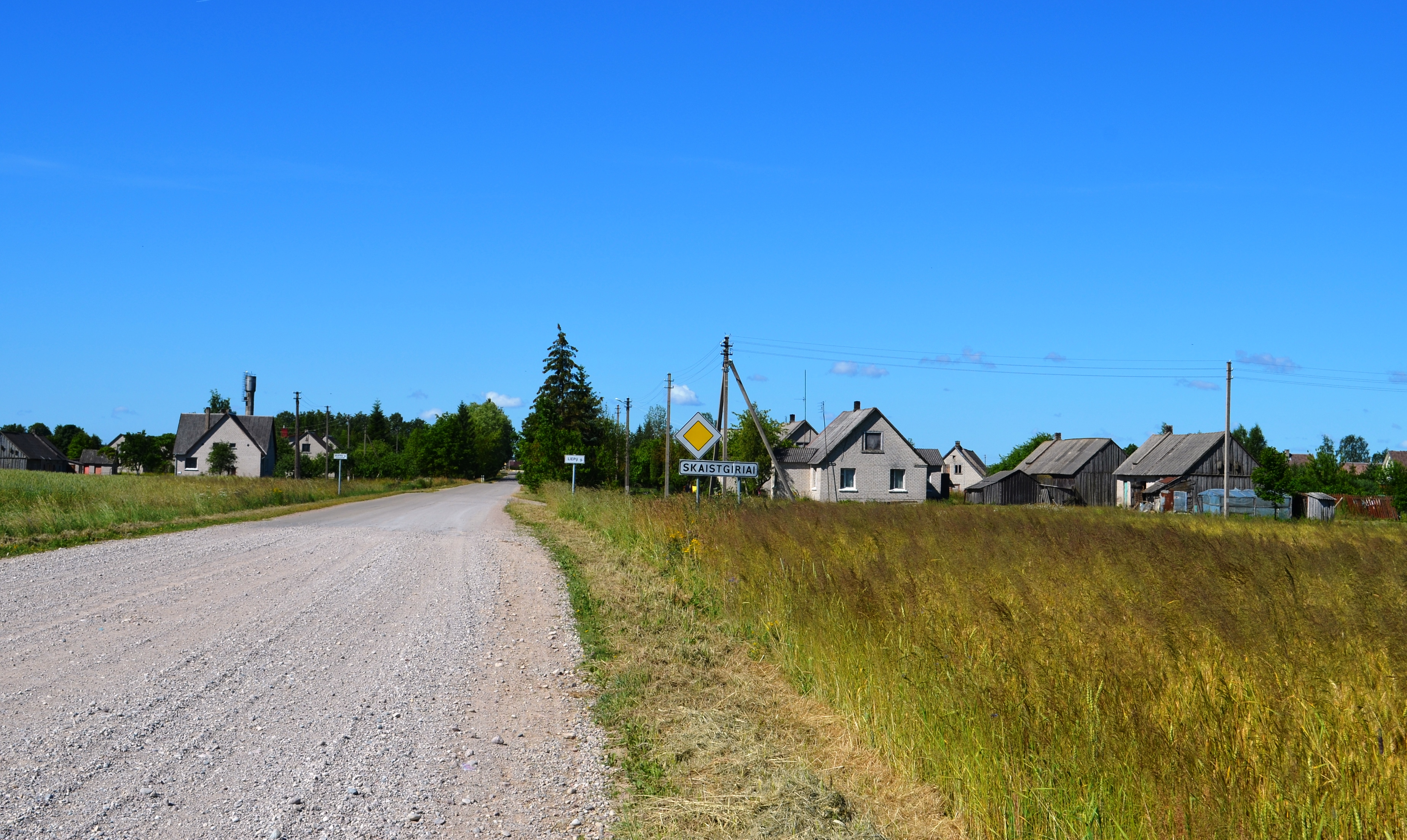

- Location in Lithuania Skaistgiriai (Lithuania)
- Coordinates: 55°11′49″N 23°43′01″E
- Country: Lithuania
- County: Kaunas County
- Municipality: Kėdainiai district municipality
- Eldership: Josvainiai Eldership

Population (2011)
  - Total: 239
- Time zone: UTC+2 (EET)
  - Summer (DST): UTC+3 (EEST)

Skaistgiriai ('bright woods') is a village in Kėdainiai district municipality, in Kaunas County, in central Lithuania. According to the 2011 census, the village had a population of 239 people. It is located 9 kilometres (5.6 mi) from Josvainiai, by the Aluona river and its tributary the Sakuona, surrounded by the Pernarava-Šaravai Forest. There are library, forestry and former school in Skaistgiriai.

== History ==
During the Lithuanian Land Reform of the 1920s, the former Šaravai estate (previously belonging to Benediktas Tiškevičius) was partitioned, starting in 1923. In January 1926, the Land Reform Board issued Resolution No. 2989, which officially renamed the settlement from Šaravai manor to Skaisgiriai village (later spelled Skaistgiriai), following a proposal from the local municipality.

During the Soviet era it was a center of the "New Life" kolkhoz.

== Demography ==
Historical population

Year	Pop.	±% p.a.
1959	62	—
1970	93	+3.75%
1979	187	+8.07%
1987	262	+4.31%

Year	Pop.	±% p.a.
1989	260	−0.38%
2001	294	+1.03%
2011	239	−2.05%

Source: 1902, 1923, 1959 & 1970, 1979, 1989, 2001, 2011

== Images ==
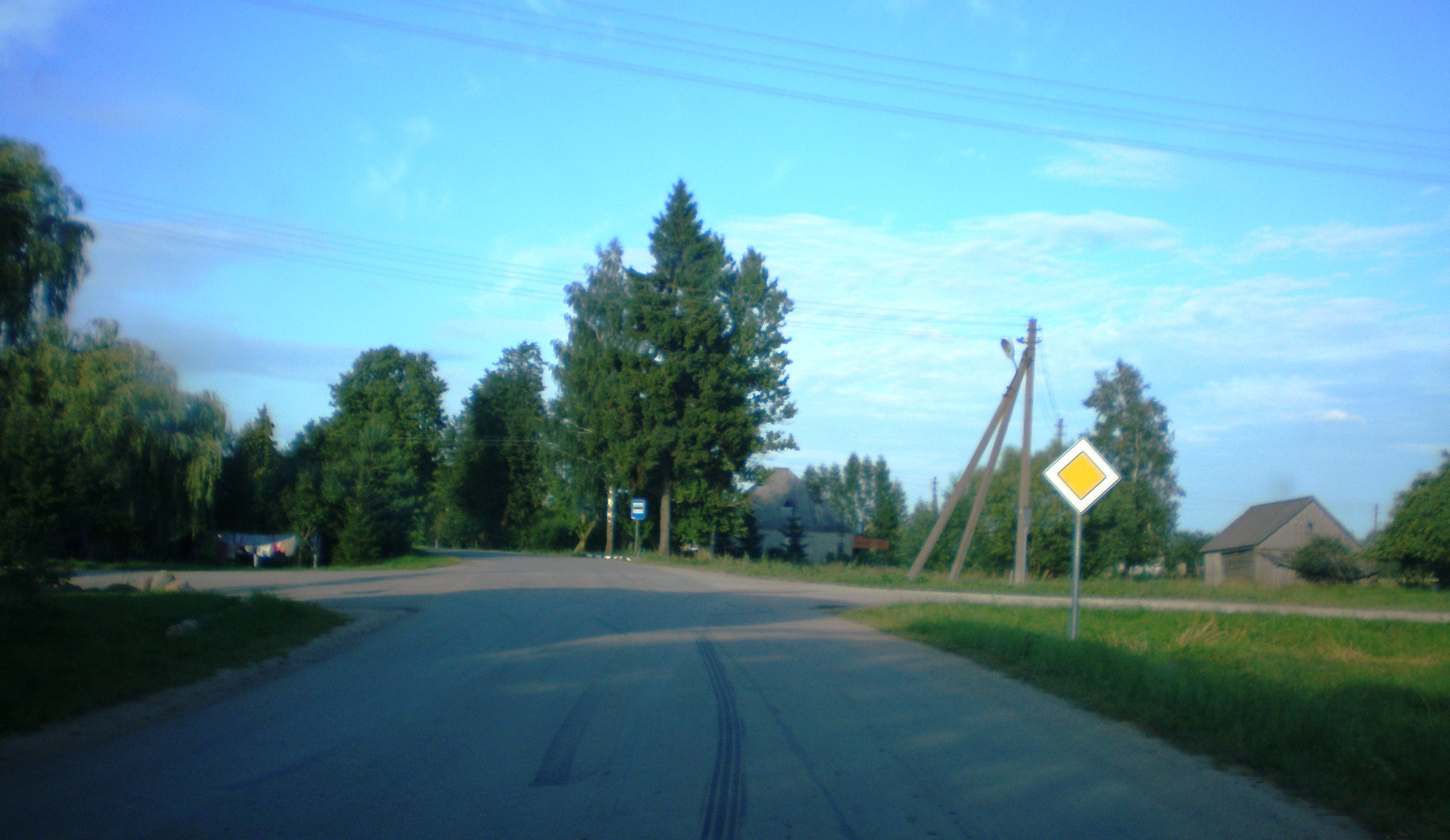
Main street

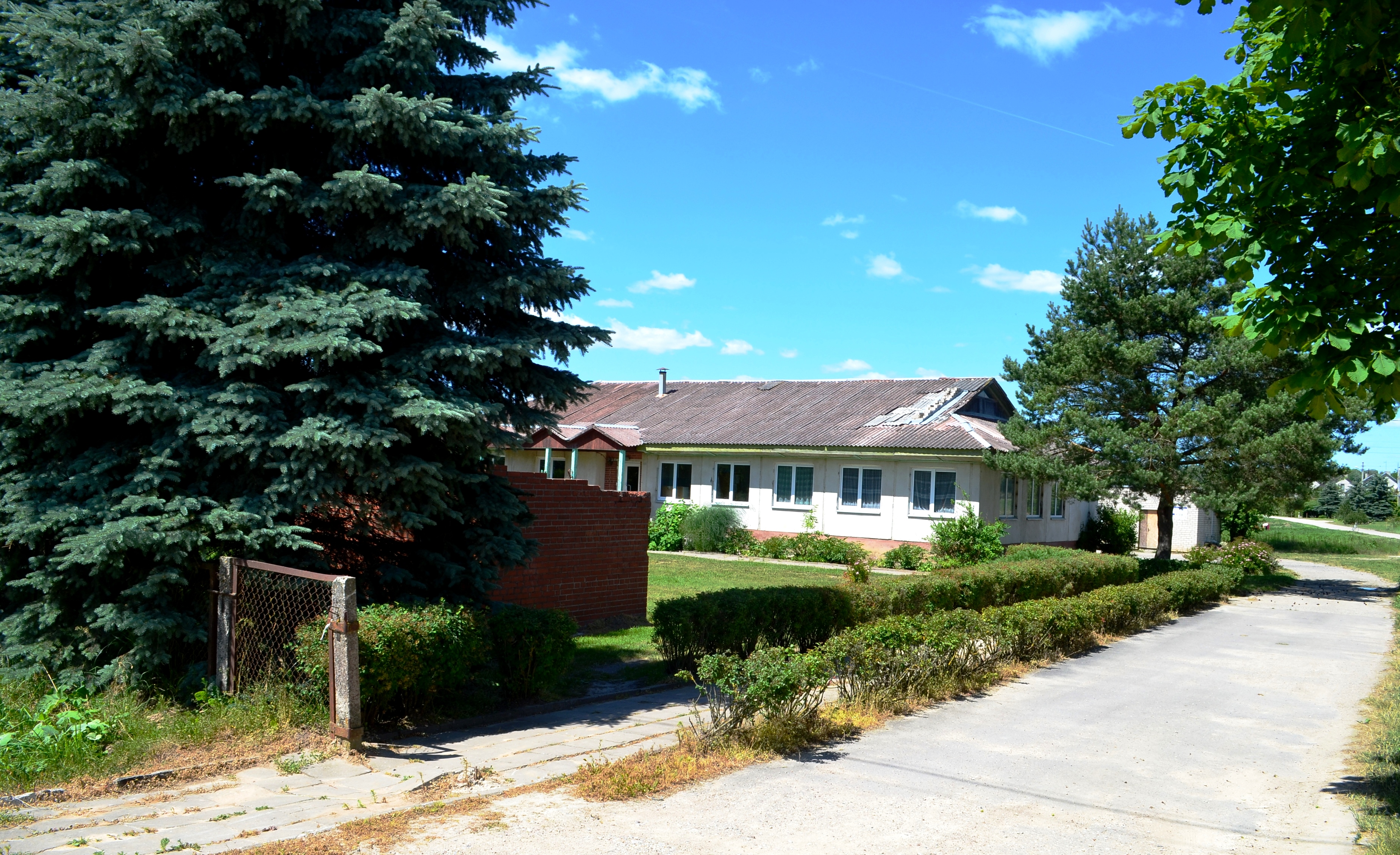
Former school

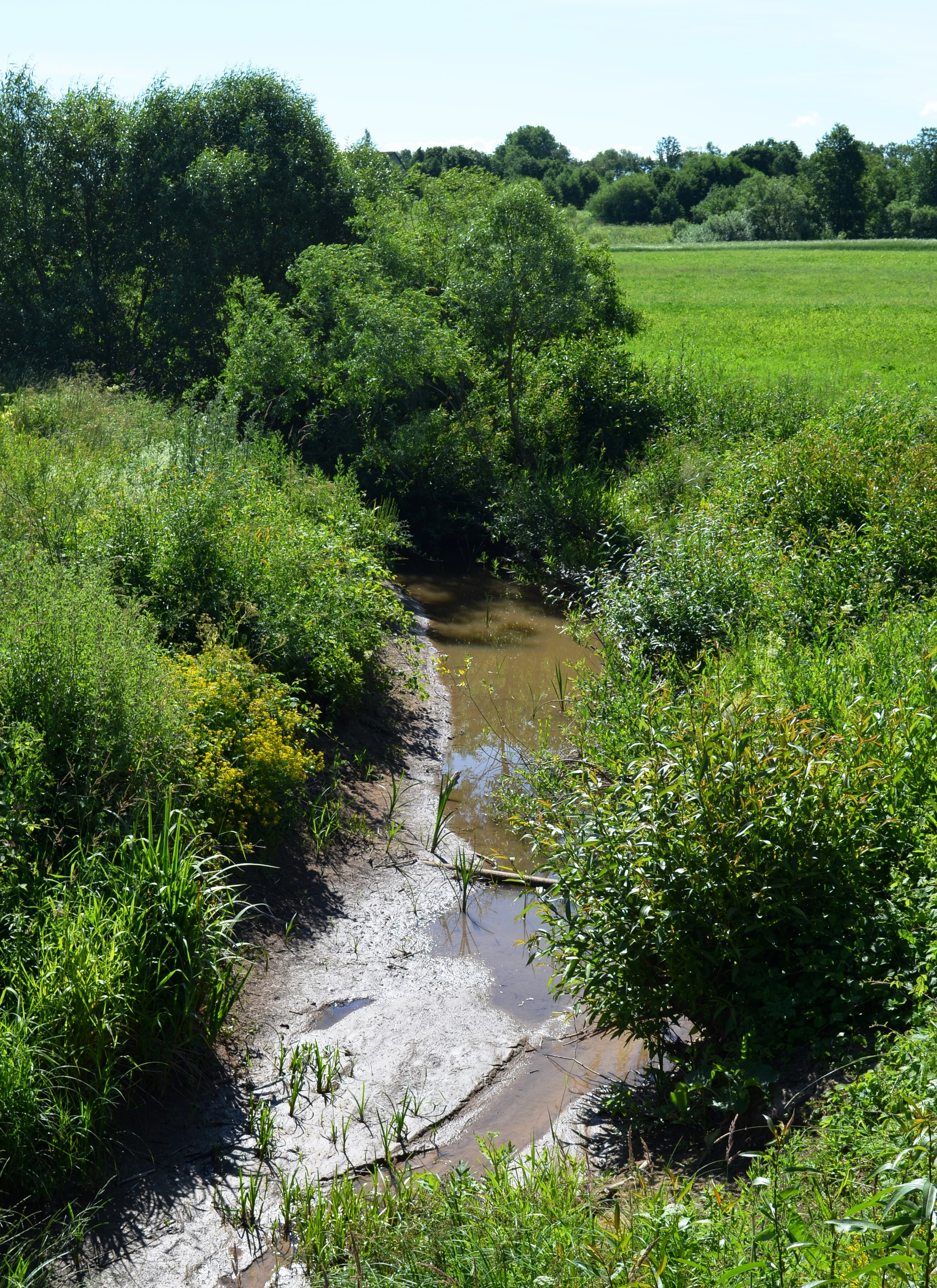
Aluona in Skaistgiriai

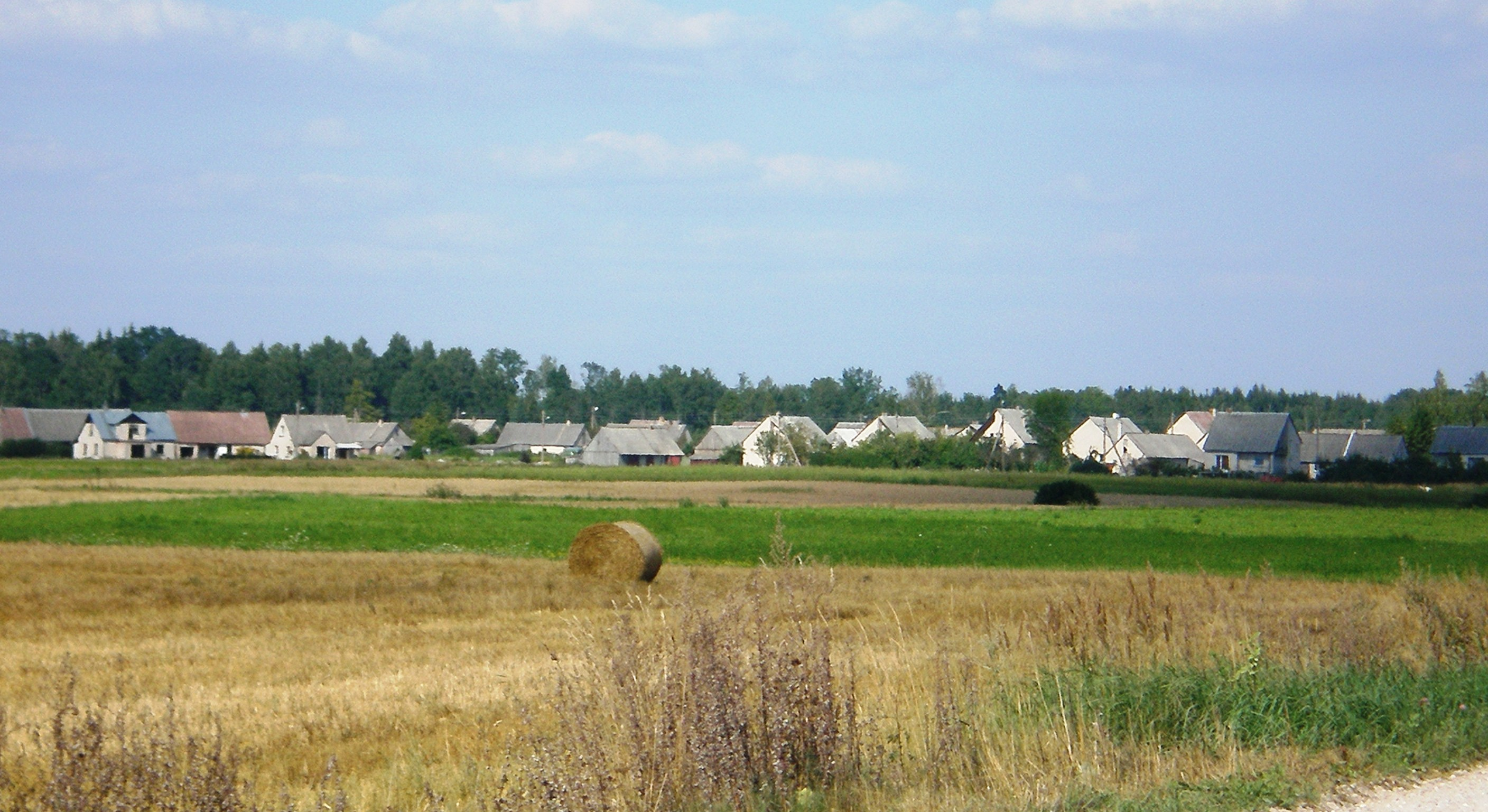
Skaistgiriai from the south
