= Paaluonys =

- Village
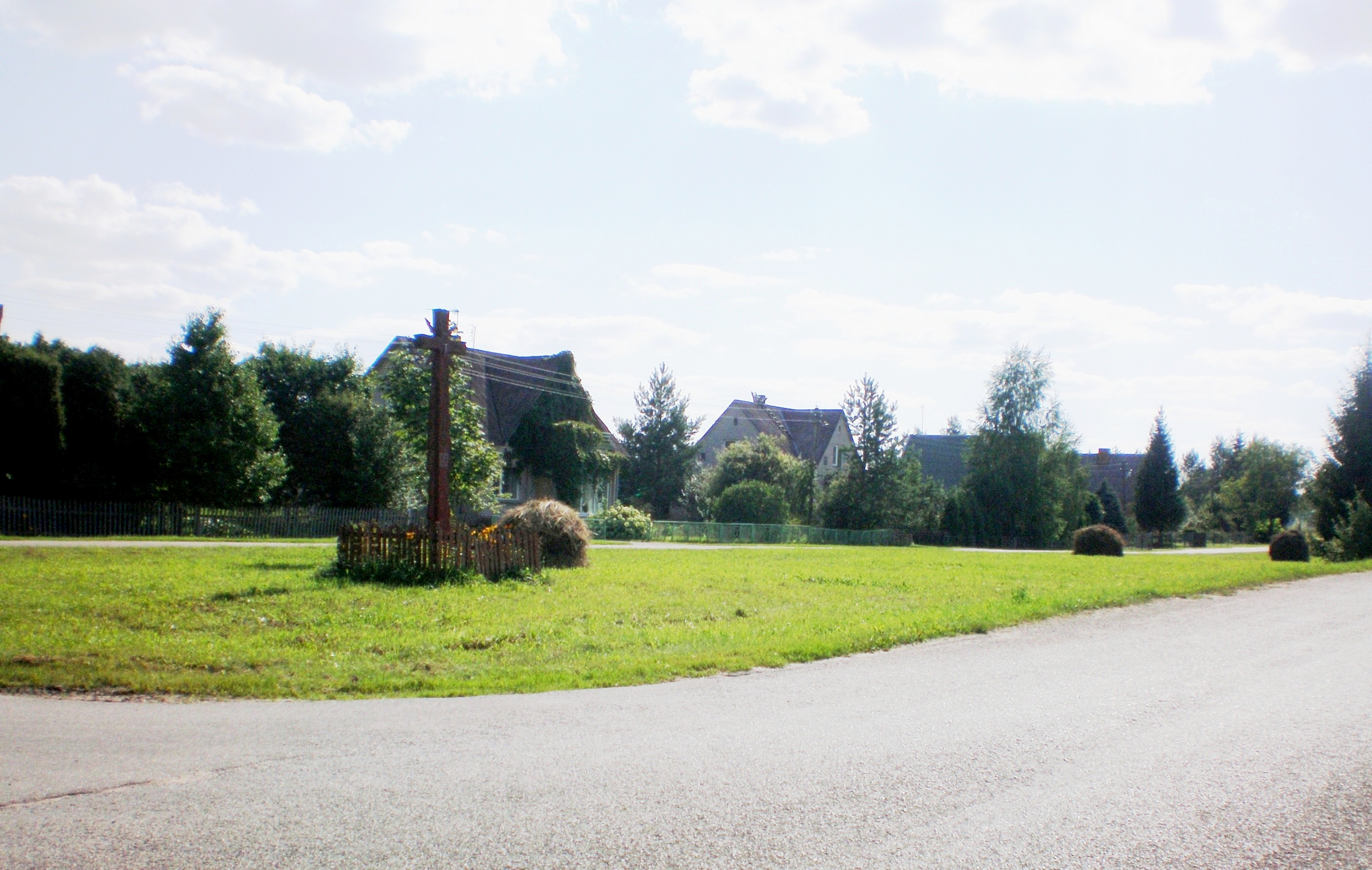

- Location in Lithuania Paaluonys (Lithuania)
- Coordinates: 55°13′08″N 23°37′08″E
- Country: Lithuania
- County: Kaunas County
- Municipality: Kėdainiai district municipality
- Eldership: Pernarava Eldership

Population (2011)
  - Total: 169
- Time zone: UTC+2 (EET)
  - Summer (DST): UTC+3 (EEST)

Paaluonys (formerly Daukšiškė, Russian: Даукшишки, Polish: Daukszyszki) is a village in Kėdainiai district municipality, in Kaunas County, in central Lithuania. According to the 2011 census, the village had a population of 169 people. It is located 5 kilometres (3.1 mi) from Pernarava, by the Aluona river. There is a library and a gristmill.

== History ==
Till the beginning of the 20th century the village was known as Daukšiškė. During the Soviet era Paaluonys was the "Bright Road" kolkhoz center.

== Demography ==
Historical population

Year	Pop.	±% p.a.
1820	10	—
1902	17	+0.65%
1923	76	+7.39%
1959	54	−0.94%
1970	49	−0.88%

Year	Pop.	±% p.a.
1979	99	+8.13%
1986	179	+8.83%
1989	200	+3.77%
2001	215	+0.60%
2011	169	−2.38%

Source: 1902, 1923, 1959 & 1970, 1979, 1989, 2001, 2011

== Images ==
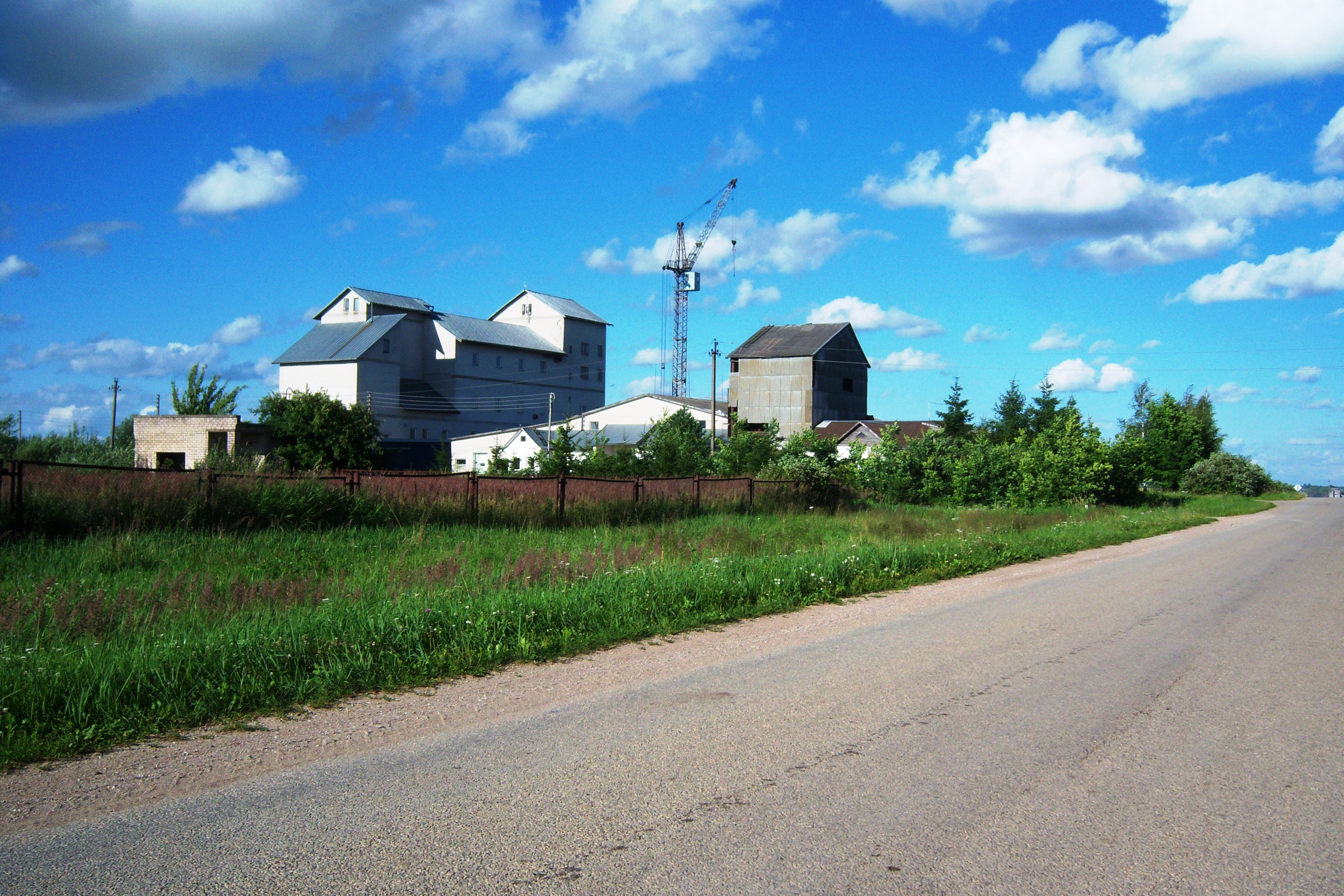
Paaluonys gristmill

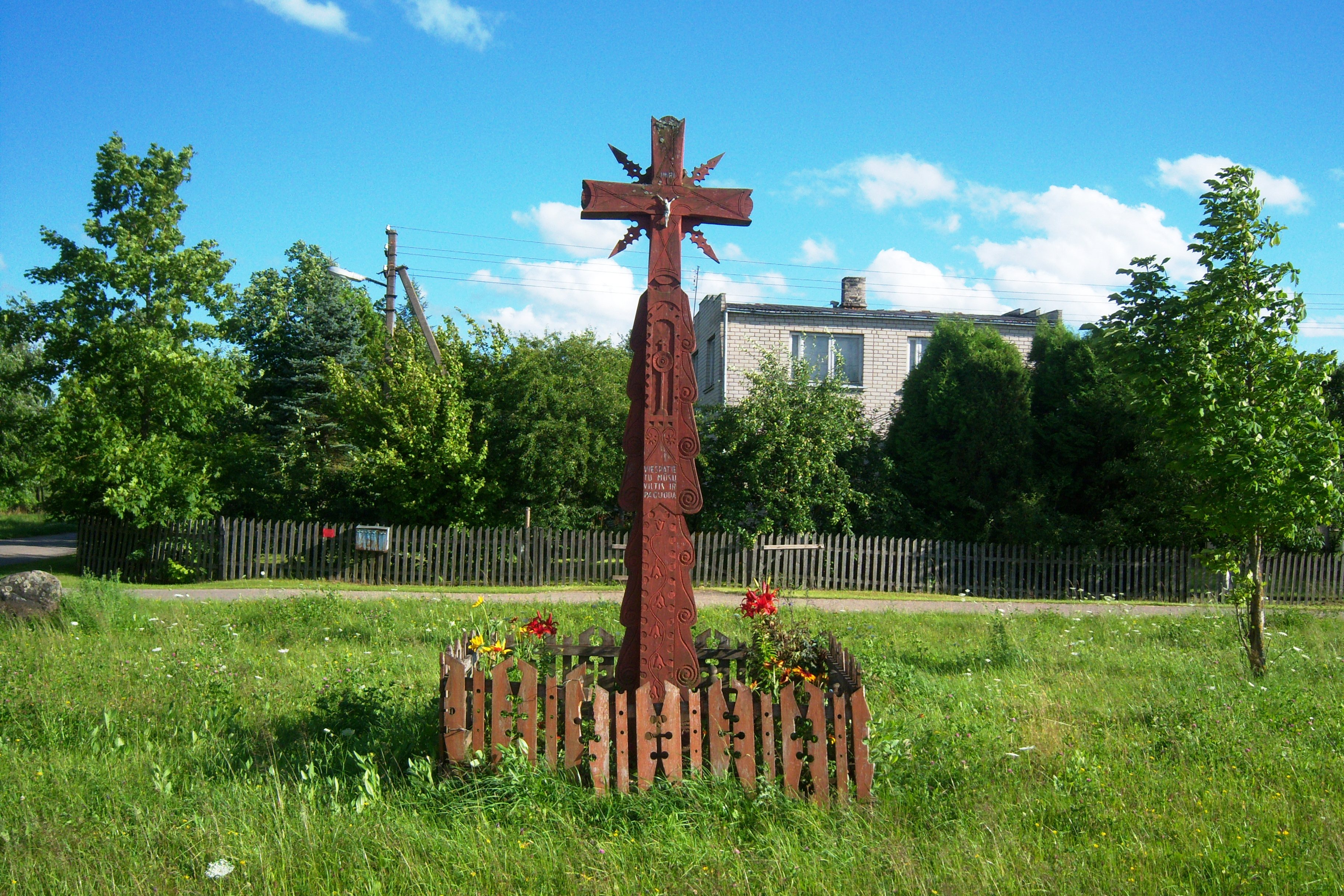
Village cross

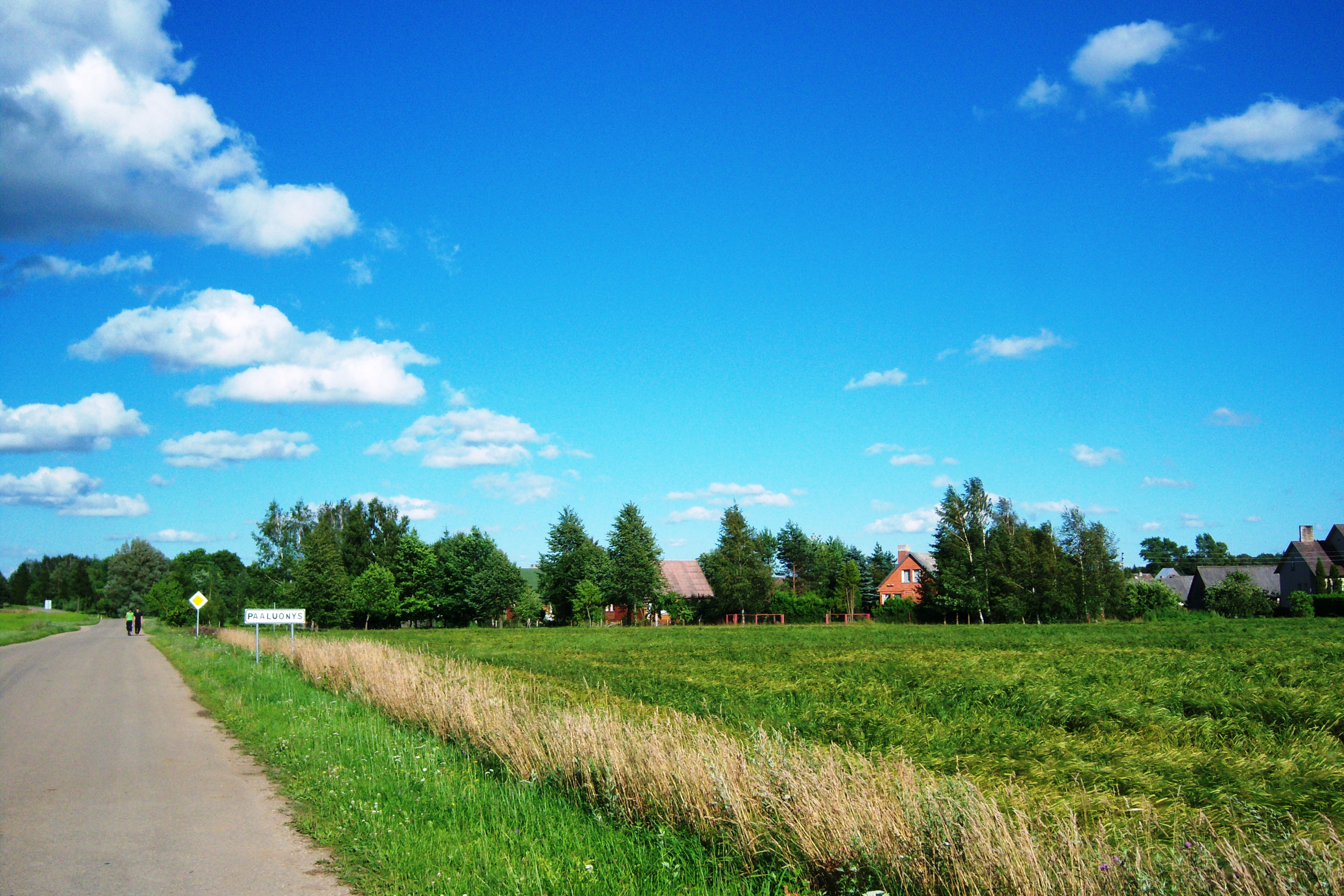
Village entrance
