= Budai (disambiguation) =

Budai, also known as the Laughing Buddha, is a semi-historical Chinese monk who is venerated as a deity in Chinese Buddhism.

Budai may also refer to:

== Places ==
- Budai, Chiayi, Taiwanese township
- Budăi (disambiguation), several places in Romania and Moldova
- Būdai, Josvainiai, village in Kaunas County, Lithuania
- Būdai, Vilainiai, village in Kaunas County, Lithuania

== People ==
- Budai (surname)
- Marius-Constantin Budăi, Romanian politician

== Other uses ==
- Buday, Japanese parrotfish, Calotomus japonicus

== See also ==
- Buday, variant spelling Budai
- Hotei (disambiguation), Japanese term for Budai
- Smiling Buddha, India's first successful nuclear weapons test in 1974
