= Antal Both =

Hungarian teacher, pedagogue and Roman Catholic theologian

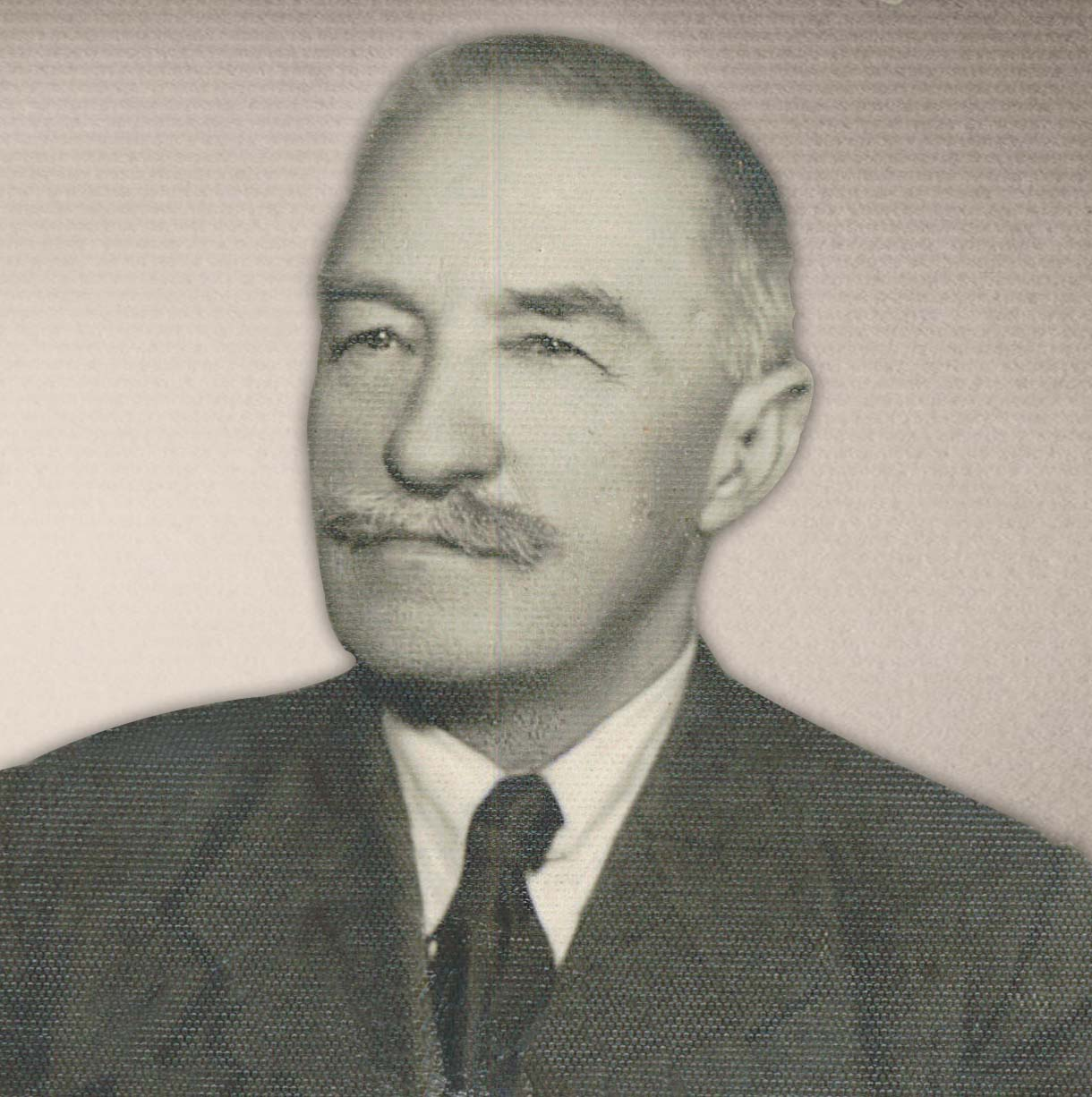
- Born: September 2, 1875; Nagyberezna, Ung County, Hungary (now Ukraine)
- Died: July 30, 1963 (aged 87); Balassagyarmat, Hungary
- Title: Theologian, Pedagogue
- Spouse: Margit Hegedűs
- Children: 7

Antal Both (September 2, 1875 – July 30, 1963) was a Hungarian teacher, pedagogue and Roman Catholic theologian.

== Life ==
Antal Both was a descendant of the Botfalvi Both family of noble origins, having its ancestral residence in Ung County. He was born on September 2, 1875, in Nagyberezna (today Velikij Bereznij, Ukraine), as the son of the Roman Catholic Ferdinand Both. At that time, the settlement had mixed national and religious population, with a majority of Rusine and German inhabitants. Ferdinand, the father of Antal Both, set up a pharmacy in this town. In 1885, when Antal was 10 years old, his parents enrolled him in the Piarist grammar school in Nagykároly (today Carei, Romania). Since this school did not have the right to run 7th and 8th-grade classes, he went to study to the Roman Catholic grammar school in Szatmárnémeti (Satu Mare, Romania). He graduated from there in 1893.

After his matura examinations, he stayed in Szatmárnémeti and had schooling in the diocesan seminary of Szatmár. Not long before the beginning of his studies there, bishop Lőrinc Schlauch introduced general pedagogical subjects such as Pedagogy, Didactics, Hygienics and First aid into the curriculum.

One of his most prominent teachers was Alajos Wolkenberg (1871–1935), a charismatic preacher, clergyman scholar and later professor in Budapest, who was only a few years Antal's senior. Wolkenberg's mysticism, spiritualism, his views on the worldwide mission of Catholicism and on world peace influenced Antal Both deeply, who, combining these ideas and inspirations with theosophical reflection rejected by Wolkenberg, later developed them into a unique and extreme form of thought.

In 1897, supposedly under Wolkenberg's influence, Antal Both did not choose priesthood as his profession after completing his theological studies, but matriculated at the Greek-Latin Pedagogical Department of Pázmány Péter University in Budapest, Hungary. He earned his degree in April 1903, and he moved to Balassagyarmat (Hungary) in the same year and became an assistant teacher in the grammar school there. In 1906 his position was officially confirmed, and from that time on his life and career bound him to this town. Around the time he received his pedagogic diploma, he married telekesi Margit Hegedűs, Ferenc Kazinczy's great-granddaughter. From this marriage nine children were born between 1901 and 1919. Margit, Sarolta,

The Hungarian Royal and State Grammar School was established in 1900, shortly before the arrival of Antal Both, and as a Gimnazium (high school) was named after Bálint Balassi in 1922. The number of students was around 300 on average, nearly 50% of those enrolled were from Balassagyarmat. Israelite and Roman Catholic students made up 80% of the student body in equal proportion. All students spoke Hungarian as their native tongue. At the beginnings, the influential headmaster of the grammar school was Ferenc Jankovics, who organized catering for poor students (“Student’s Table”), a music circle and the Madách Literary and Debating Society, which played a substantial role in the cultural life of the town.

In 1909 a vocational school was also established on his initiative. It was headed by Antal Both. Similarly to some 60 other schools of this type nationwide, it served the education of graduated apprentices and journeymen who stood before their military training. Antal Both was in military service during World War I. In 1918, he was honorably discharged as a territorial lieutenant, and he was honored with the Signum Laudis award for his service. He was an active participant and organizer of the uprising in Balassagyarmat (“the chasing away of the Bohemians”), which happened at the end of January 1919. He was on furlough at the time of the Hungarian Soviet Republic, and, according to some sources, he spent the time on studying vocational schools. Afterwards, “in the whole year of 1920 he was granted leave by the Board of Education and Religion with a full stipend.”

After 1920, he spent 15 highly active years in Balassagyarmat until his retirement. In addition to lecturing on his favorite subjects, Latin and Greek, he founded the Clerical Society and the local body of the Turan Assembly. He regularly organized series of educational lectures, which he himself attended and occasionally commented, presenting his special religious and Christian social views. He organized and edited a local journal under title of Magyar Társadalom (Hungarian Society), which provided him with publication opportunities. The first edition of the periodical appeared in 1914, and after a longer pause was restarted in 1926, but despite his efforts, it remained a local paper. He actively participated in the work of the Hungarian Society for Social Sciences, the Catholic Young Men's Club and the Madách Society. He was also an elected official of the latter.

As a teacher, he was committed to modern pedagogical methods, and he emphasized the moral education of youth. His responsibility for his students urged him as inventor to patent his school-backpack and the “aerating shoes”, a forerunner of modern sports shoes, the self-wring floor mop (forerunner of the twist wonder mop), and the fade away ink (forerunner of the invisible ink). Despite his rigor, he was a popular teacher. His students looked up to him and remembered him with affection even after decades.

He retired in 1936, at the age of 61. His colleague, Károly Blazsik wrote his valedictory for the school's bulletin. He emphasized Both's admiration for classical languages, his work for public instruction, his labor as an adult educator, and also that “he was for is students a teacher not in a bureaucratic sense but like a nurturer and loving father. He instructed them with the pedagogical force of example by accompanying the students to church every Sunday and feast day. He also attended the weekday services, where he kneeled, prayed and took holy communion with exemplary devotion. This is how he cultivated a disposition of a good person, a good teacher and a good father.” His former pupil József Kamarás wrote in his memoirs that they respected their teacher and also his family, noting at the same time that “his writings and letters bear witness that, as a teacher striving for the fine, the good and the noble, he even accepted frequent ridicule and failure in the belief that he was the possessor of a godly talent.”

Although at the beginning of his career a few course-books were published under his name, his career as a writer truly flourished after his retirement from work and public life. This is true even though his manuscripts did not appear in print, apart from his self-published pamphlet entitled “A Both nemzetség családrendi értesítője” and another booklet also published in Balassagyarmat under the title of “A családok világrendje: Hittani ismertetés” (1942). His manuscripts, stored in three archival boxes in the Archives of the Tiszántúl Reformed Diocese, were composed mainly in the period between the 1940s and 1950s. From the last 15 years of his life, no manuscripts exist. Until his death he was working to create a comprehensive dictionary of the six languages he spoke. He also had an extensive contact network via letter discussions with the Vatican (Latin), the Russian Orthodox Pope (Russian), the Greek Orthodox Archdiocese (Greek), and in Hebrew with the various Rabbis of the Hungarian Rabbinical Schools. Some of the manuscripts were taken from Hungary in 1945. Probably Antal Both himself handed them over to his daughter and her husband when they were leaving for the United States, to cover their living expenses by publishing them in case of financial need. Although the translation of one of his works into English was completed, it has never been published. Antal Both's other documents and his miscellaneous, mainly personal literary remains continue to be kept in Balassagyarmat.

Antal Both's thinking is characterized by mysticism, historical-theological reflection, prophetic self-definition, a naïve and peculiar mingling of distinct ideologies and at the same time by a desire for insight, a strong sense of social responsibility, and a deep commitment to nation and humanity. Jeopardizing his and his family's life, he hid three Jewish boys in his press house and saved them from certain death. Although he held the Jews responsible for the coming apocalyptic end-time, he hoped for their collective conversion that would usher in the age of Salvation. He was also convinced that God endowed the Hungarian nation with a distinctive role in this process. Szabadi sees in this mentality the reason for Antal Both's openness to other religious denominations and for his insistence on promoting the mission among Russians and Jews. For him, the church hierarchy was fallen and priests could not achieve the unity between denominations and nations. This task could only be accomplished by the “secular order”, the common priesthood of lay believers. His thoughts significantly diverged from biblical teachings and the tenets of Christian churches in other areas, too. According to József Takács, “his spirituality was noticeably influenced, besides Catholicism, by symbolism, the social movements between the two World Wars, and by the writings of a Rabbi from Rimaszombat (today Rimavska Sobotá, Slovakia) as well as by contemporary political events such as World War 2, which broke out in 1939, the Prime Ministerial order forcing the Jews to wear discriminating marks in 1944, the beginnings of the communist regime in 1948, and the Cold War. […] Antal Both had original concepts, views and ideas, but these do not elevate him to the level of the middlebrow theologians and philosophers of the first half of the 20th century.” Éva Elekes summarizes her opinion about Antal Both as follows: “Even if the Teacher was a bit ‘eccentric’ and ‘dreaming’, his life was effective, busy and extraordinary. His openness and ability for renewal, and his social personality command respect and provide an example for us today.”

The Antal Both Theological and Cultural Foundation, with a mission to foster dialogue and practical cooperation between denominations, was established by the initiative of his daughter, Marianne Bodnar in 2016. The Foundation has its seat in Debrecen, at the Reformed College of Debrecen. Antal Both’s life was honored with a commemorative tablet placed on the wall of his former workplace, the grammar school in Balassagyarmat, in 2017.

== Printed works ==
- Antal Both: A görög himnusokról. Balassagyarmat, Kókai Lajos bizom. Bpesten, 1904.
- Antal Both: Latin nyelvtan. I. rész. Balassagyarmat, Wertheimer Zsigmond, 1905.
- Antal Both: Példagyűjtő a latin nyelvtan mondattani részéhez II. rész. Balassagyarmat, Wertheimer Zsigmond, 1907.
- Antal Both: Művelődési állapotok a középkorban (é.n.)
- Antal Both: Krónika. A Both-nemzetség családrendi értesítője. 3. füzet, Balassagyarmat, 1939.
- Antal Both: A családok világrendje. Hittani ismertetés (Igecselekvők könyvtára), Grünberger Adolf könyvnyomdája, Balassagyarmat, 1942. [magánkiadás]

== Antal Both Theological and Cultural Foundation ==
Antal Both’s daughter, who emigrated to the United States in 1945 with her husband, István Bodnár, established a foundation named “Marianne Bodnar 2000 Living Trust” in order to commemorate and to cultivate the memory of her father. Following her death, the appointed trustees of the Foundation, who had formerly come into contact with the Reformed College of Debrecen in connection with another trust, found that Marianne Bodnár's original intentions can be best achieved through the Debrecen Reformed College and its member institution, the Reformed Theological University of Debrecen. Consequently, they initiated the establishment of a new, Hungarian foundation as a legal successor of the “Living Trust” at the Tiszántúl Reformed Diocese. The Board of Directors of the Diocese and of the college decided in favor of the request, and registered the trust as “Antal Both Theological and Cultural Foundation” in 2016.

The main objective of the foundation is to cultivate the memory and the intellectual and cultural heritage of Antal Both as well as to support other scholarly and cultural activities that serve ecumenical dialogue, especially between the Roman Catholic and the Protestant Churches, in order to deepen and reinforce their mutual understanding, and to create opportunities for joint ministry and witness. In accordance with these objectives, the Board of Trustees offers grants that assist research projects related to Denominational Studies, support cultural events with ecumenical aspects as well as school programs and the publication of books. The Foundation grants the “Por Unitate in Christo” Award, established by the Foundation, to those who preeminently foster ecumenical dialogue. It also sponsors publication and research projects in the field of Denominational Studies. Many documents from Antal Both's literary remains, together with material related to the foundation's operation and grants as well as news and announcements can be found on the Foundation’s website (www.bothantal.hu).

=== Recipients of the "Pro Unitate in Christo" Award ===
- 2019 — Mihály Kránitz, Roman Catholic theologian

== Literature ==
- István Szabadi: Both Antal (1875–1963) élete és munkássága, in: Studia. Debreceni Teológiai Tanulmányok 10/1–2 (2018), pp. 114–124.
- Zoltán Kustár: A Debreceni Református Kollégium legújabb alapítványa: Bemutatkozik a Both Antal Teológiai és Kulturális Alapítvány, in: Studia. Debreceni Teológiai Tanulmányok 10/1–2 (2018), pp. 112–113.
- Tamás Zonda: Both Antal, in: idem: Balassagyarmat jeles polgárai, Balassagyarmat, 2011, p. 47.
- Éva Elekes: Both Antal, in: Honismereti Híradó. 2. szám, Balassagyarmat, 1987, pp. 99–104.
- Zsuzsanna Barthó– Árpád Tyekvicska: Civitas fortissima. A balassagyarmati „csehkiverés” korának forrásai és irodalma (Nagy Iván Könyvek 10), Balassagyarmat, 2000.
- Béla Meliórisz: A Bothfalvi Both család czímere. Turul 19 (1901), pp. 38–41.
- Margit Busa: Dokumentumok Kazinczy Thália családjáról, in: Széphalom: a Kazinczy Ferenc Társaság évkönyve. 9. kötet, 1997, pp. 53–66.
- A Balassagyarmati Magyar Királyi Állami Gimnázium Értesítője az 1935–1936-os tanévről, Balassagyarmati Magyar Királyi Állami Gimnázium, Balassagyarmat, 1936, pp. 4–5.
- József Mayer: Munkásgimnáziumok, lásd http://ofi.hu/publikacio/munkasgimnaziumok [downloaded: Nov 6, 2018].
