= Budai (surname) =

Budai is a surname. Notable people with the surname include:

- Bernadett Budai, Hungarian politician
- Ézsaiás Budai, Hungarian Protestant theologian
- Gyula Budai, Hungarian politician
- László Budai, former Hungarian football player
- Pál Budai, Hungarian Jewish composer
- Pál Budai (boxer) (born 1925), Hungarian boxer

== See also ==
- Buday, surname
