= László Filep =

Hungarian mathematician

- Born: 6 December 1941; Császló, Hungary
- Died: 19 November 2004 (aged 62); Budapest, Hungary
- Education: University of Debrecen
- Scientific career
- Fields: Mathematics
- Workplaces: College of Nyíregyháza
- Doctoral advisor: Barna Szénássy; Lajos Tamássy

László Filep (6 December 1941 Császló – 19 November 2004 Budapest) was a Hungarian mathematician who specialized in history of mathematics. His Ph.D. advisors at the University of Debrecen were Barna Szénássy and Lajos Tamássy.

== Selected publications ==
- Filep, László (1999). "Pythagorean side and diagonal numbers" (PDF). Acta Mathematica Academiae Paedagogicae Nyíregyháziensis. 15: 1–7.

== Books ==
- Queen of the sciences (Development of mathematics)
- Game theory
- The history of number writing
