= Budăi =

Budăi may refer to the following places:

== Romania ==
- Budăi, a village administered by Podu Iloaiei town, Iaşi County
- Budăi, hill in the proximity of Călugăreni in Botoşani County

== Moldova ==
- Budăi, Taraclia, a commune in Taraclia district
- Budăi, Teleneşti, a commune in Teleneşti district
- Budăi, a village in Ţipala Commune, Ialoveni district
- Budăi, a village in Step-Soci Commune, Orhei district
