= Kalman Varga =

Hungarian-American physicist

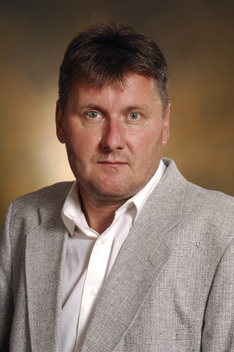
- Born: Varga Kálmán; Gyula, Hungary
- Education: PhD, University of Debrecen, 1996
- Occupation(s): University professor, Author

Kalman Varga is a Hungarian-American physicist, currently at Vanderbilt University. He researches computational nanoscience, focusing on developing novel computational methods for electronic structure calculations. He is an Elected Fellow of the American Physical Society. He was accredited to co-writing Computational Nanoscience: Applications for Molecules, Clusters, and Solids in 2011, as well as Structure and Reactions of Light Exotic Nuclei (2003), and Stochastic Variational Approach to Quantum-Mechanical Few-Body Problems (1998).
