= István Hatvani =

Hungarian mathematician (1718–1786)

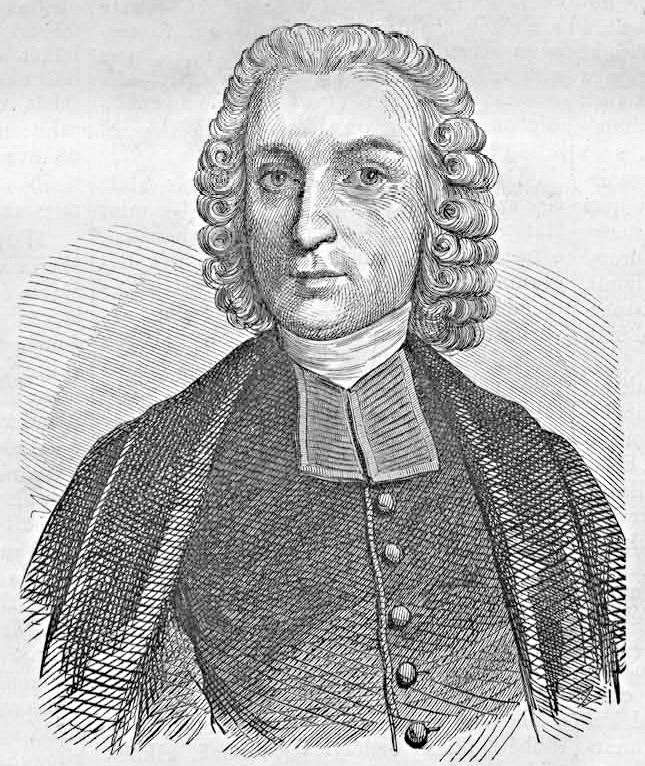
István Hatvani.

István Hatvani (21 November 1718 – 16 November 1786) was a Hungarian polyhistor, mathematician, natural philosopher and theologian. Born in Rimavská Sobota (then Rimaszombat), he studied at the Debrecen Reformed Theological University before setting off on his scholarly travels to Basel, Utrecht and Leiden, where he acquired doctorates in theology and medicine and studied under luminaries such as Johann Bernoulli and Daniel Bernoulli. Returning to Debrecen in 1749, he was appointed professor of mathematics, philosophy and experimental physics, introducing a rigorous Newtonian, experiment-based approach in place of the predominant Wolffian logic‑deductive method. His expansive teaching repertoire ranged from theology and ontology to mechanics, astronomy and early probability theory, making him the first Hungarian to apply the law of large numbers in mortality statistics and laying foundations for political arithmetic and proto‑economics in Hungary.

== Early life and education ==
Hatvani began his studies at the partikuláris of the Debreceni Kollégium, attending from age 6 at the Helvetic Latin school in Rimaszombat, a preparatory division of the Sárospatak College. He advanced to its higher classes by age 23 after overcoming initial entry barriers and surviving the plague outbreak that struck Debrecen in 1739, which claimed nearly 9 000 lives and delayed college admissions by three years. In 1746 he travelled to Basel on scholarship, enrolling simultaneously in theology and medicine. By 1747 he had earned his licentiate and Doctor of Divinity, and in March 1748 he successfully defended a doctoral thesis in medicine, De aestimatione morborum cum facie, on diagnosing disease from facial features. During this period he also studied mathematics under Johann and Daniel Bernoulli, and subsequently deepened his knowledge of physics and mathematics at Utrecht and Leiden before declining academic posts abroad to serve the Reformed Church and nation.

== Academic career ==
Returning to Debrecen in December 1748, Hatvani took up his professorship on 17 January 1749 with a celebrated inauguration lecture, Latin: De matheseos utilitate in theologia ac in physica necessitate, outlining the indispensability of mathematics to theology and physics. He championed the empirical, experimental method of Newton over Christian Wolff's purely deductive framework—an innovation unique in contemporary Europe, where even Euler refrained from contesting Wolff's philosophical authority. His major work, Introductio ad principia philosophiae solidioris (1757), emphasized the necessity of quantitative analysis across all sciences, dedicating a substantial chapter, "De probabilitate", to probability theory. In physics, he taught chemistry, botany, physiology, hydrostatics, mechanics, astronomy and the nascent science of electricity, integrating these disciplines within a unifying geometric and experimental philosophy.

== Personal life and legacy ==
A devout Christian, Hatvani prefixed all his works—and even his medical prescriptions—to students with the Greek letters alpha and omega, symbolising the unity of his faith and scholarship. He married Csatári Mária in 1749, fathering ten children, of whom four survived to adulthood. Beyond lecturing and research, he organised a student hospital and oversaw pharmaceutical care in Debrecen and Bihar county.

In November 2018, to mark his tercentenary (three-hundredth anniversary), the Debrecen Reformed Theological University held a conference, exhibition and live demonstrations of physical and chemical experiments in his honour, reflecting his enduring reputation as a pioneering experimentalist. Hatvani's encyclopaedic breadth earned him lasting respect: his methodologies influenced generations of Hungarian scholars, and his memory was celebrated in verse by Arany János and Jókai Mór. He died in Debrecen in 1786, his Latin‑inscribed tombstone—beginning with Alpha and Omega—still displayed in the Oratorium of the Reformed College.
