= Hotei =

Hotei may refer to:

- Hotei Station, a Japanese train station
- Tomoyasu Hotei, a Japanese musician
- Budai, known as "Hotei" in Japanese, a semi-historical monk and deity
- Coralliophila hotei, a species of sea snail
- School Judgement: Gakkyu Hotei, a Japanese manga series

== See also ==
- Budai (disambiguation)
