= Ferenc Kölcsey Teacher Training College of the Reformed Church =

Church college in Debrecen, Hungary

Coordinates: 47°32′3″N 21°37′35″E

- Kölcsey Ferenc Református Tanítóképző Főiskola
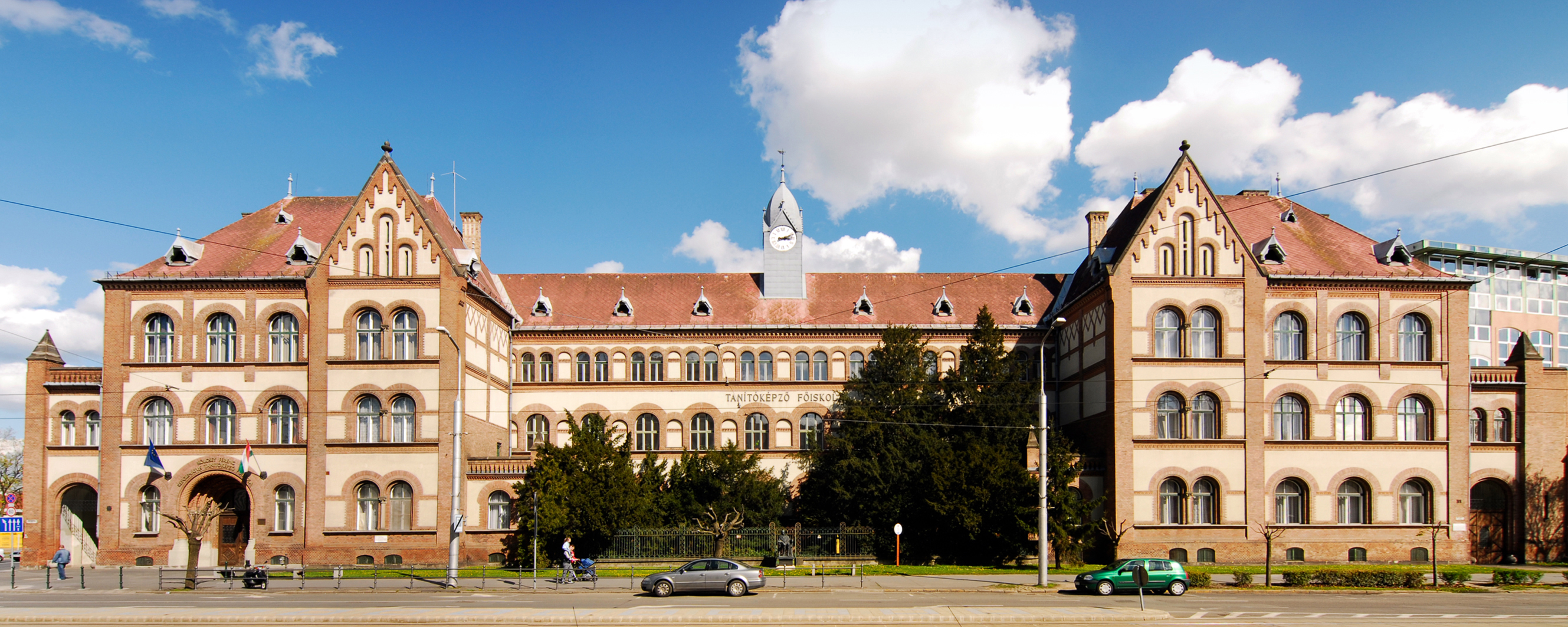
- Type: Church college
- Established: 1855
- Students: approximately 900
- Location: Debrecen, Hungary
- Website: http://www.kolcseyfoiskola.hu

The Ferenc Kölcsey Teacher Training College of the Reformed Church of Hungary had its roots in the Debrecen College of the Reformed Church. In 2011, the college integrated into Debrecen Reformed Theological University.

== History of teacher training in Hungary ==
Teachers were co-educated with pastors at the earliest period. This developed to a one-year course teacher training in 1855, and further developed after 1867. Between 1959 and 1976 the institution hosted state run tertiary teacher training that followed grammar-school studies. In 1976, the institute got status of a higher education college. In 1990 the College took the name of its one-time student, the poet of the national anthem, Ferenc Kölcsey. In 1992 a government decree returned the control of the College to the Eastern Hungarian Diocese of the Reformed Church of Hungary.

Due to its past and present the College has always played a significant role in the history of Hungarian teacher training.

From the building behind the Csokonai Theatre the College moved to the building of the former Calvinist Grammar School in 1980. The building was provided by the state, and was returned together with its entire faculty, students and staff to the Reformed Church by government decree.

"Built by the Eastern Hungarian Diocese of the Reformed Church of Hungary with the help of the state and the city of Debrecen to serve national public education", is proclaimed on a bronze plaque by the entrance door. Lower primary teacher training has become a four-year training since 1995/96. Besides general teacher training the College offers training in Communications and Media Sciences, Library and Computer Science. Students can also take part in the recently introduced higher professional trainings in Youth Assistance, Institutional and Sports Communication, and can become Press Technicians as well. The College has introduced the Hungarian national core curriculum in its teaching program. The 90.000 volume college library is housed in Maróthi Student Hostel (15 Blaháné Street). Students coming from the region have their accommodation in Maróthi Student Hostel and Kossuth Lajos Student Hostel of the University of Debrecen.

== History of the College ==
It is one of the oldest teacher training institutions in Hungary. The College is nowadays the last independent teacher training institution in Hungary that also has its own practice school.

== Origins ==
The building of the College, originally designed to be a grammar school, was built by the plans of Samu Pecz, professor of engineering at the Budapest University of Technology. The groundwork began in September 1911 and the building was inaugurated in November 1913.

Today the College is one of the higher educational institutions in the Eastern part of the country. It offers a wide range of academic programs, which are broadened each year.

== Educational Programs ==
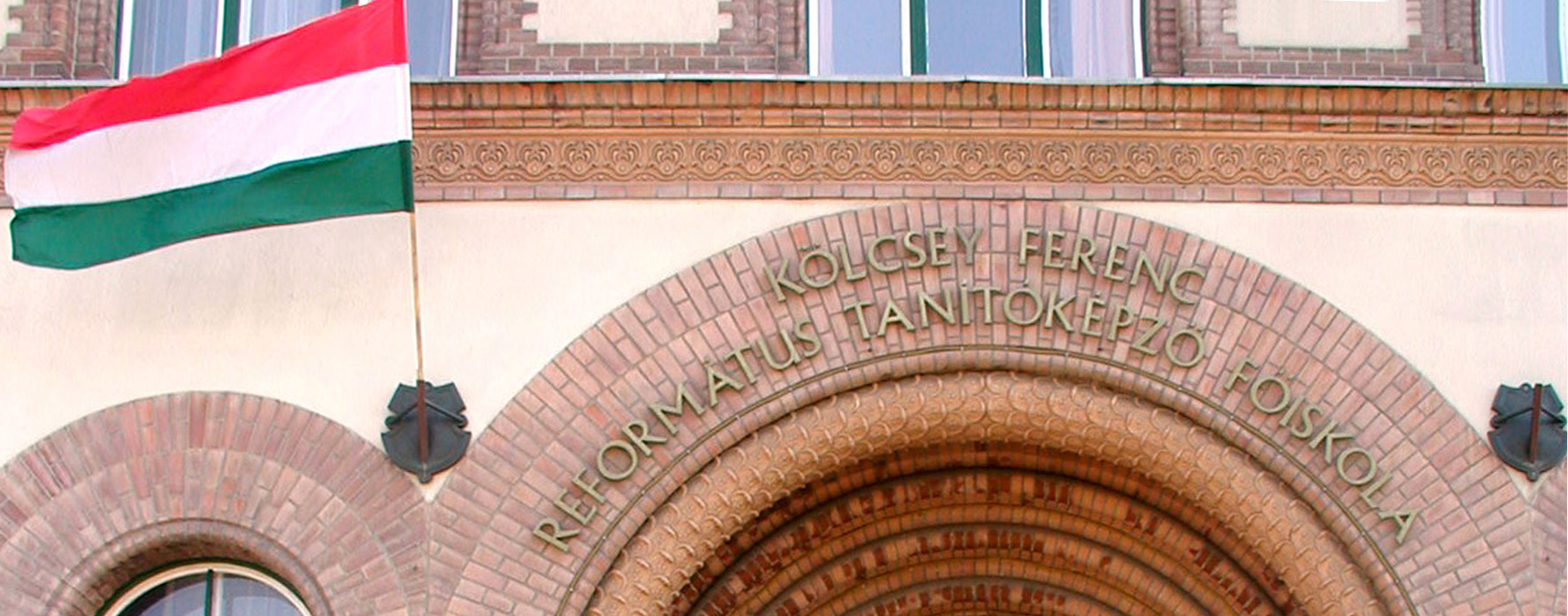

The Ferenc Kölcsey Teacher Training College of the Reformed Church offers the following educational programs in the 2010/2011 term: - BA in Education (8 semesters) - BA in Communications and Media Sciences (6 semesters) - BA in Library and Computer Science (6 semesters) - Higher professional training in Youth Assistance (4 semesters) - Higher professional training in Institutional Communication (4 semesters) - Higher professional training in Sports Communication (4 semesters) - Higher professional training of Press Technicians (4 semesters)
