= Ézsaiás Budai =

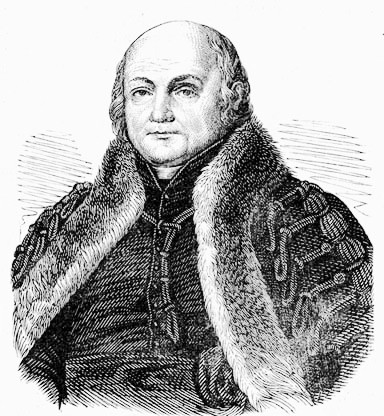
Ézsaiás Budai

Ézsaiás Budai (Pér, 7 May 1766 - Debrecen, 14 July 1841) was a Hungarian Protestant theologian and philologue.

== Life ==
His family was noble and his uncle, Budai Ferenc (1760-1802), was also a Protestant priest and the author of a scientific-historic lexicon published by his nephew after his death. Ézsaiás Budai studied at the Reformed University, which became later the University of Debrecen. From 1792 to 1794, he followed classes with Christian Gottlob Heyne, Christoph Meiners, August Ludwig von Schlözer und Ludwig Timotheus Spittler. After a journey to the Netherlands and England and a short period as a philosophy professor at the University of Göttingen, he devoted himself to religious studies.

== Works ==
- Commentatio de causis culturae tardius ad aquilonares quam ad australes Europae regiones propagatae (Göttingen, 1794)
- God. Hasse Liber de causis stili latini (Debrecen 1799)
- Közönséges historia (Debrecen 1800)
- Régi tudós világ historiája (Debrecen 1802)
- Deák nyelv kezdete példákban (Debrecen 1804)
- Ratio institutiones (Debrecen 1807)
- Magyaroszág historiájav (Debrecen 1807)
- Régi római v. deák irók élete (Debrecen 1814)
- Propaedeumata Theologiae Christ (Debrecen 1817)
- Christ. Cellarii latinitatis probatae et exercitae liber memorialis. Cum interpretatione hung. etc (Debrecen 1831)

== Sources ==
- Eintrag in Constantin von Wurzbach: Biographisches Lexikon des Kaiserthums Oesterreich, Band 2, S. 192f., Wien 1857
