= Step-Soci =

- Commune
- Interactive map of Step-Soci
- Country: Moldova
- District: Orhei District

Population (2014)
  - Total: 2,095
- Time zone: UTC+2 (EET)
  - Summer (DST): UTC+3 (EEST)

Step-Soci is a commune in Orhei District, Moldova. It is composed of two villages, Budăi and Step-Soci.
