= University of Debrecen =

University in Hungary

Coordinates: 47°33′14″N 21°37′17″E

- Debreceni Egyetem
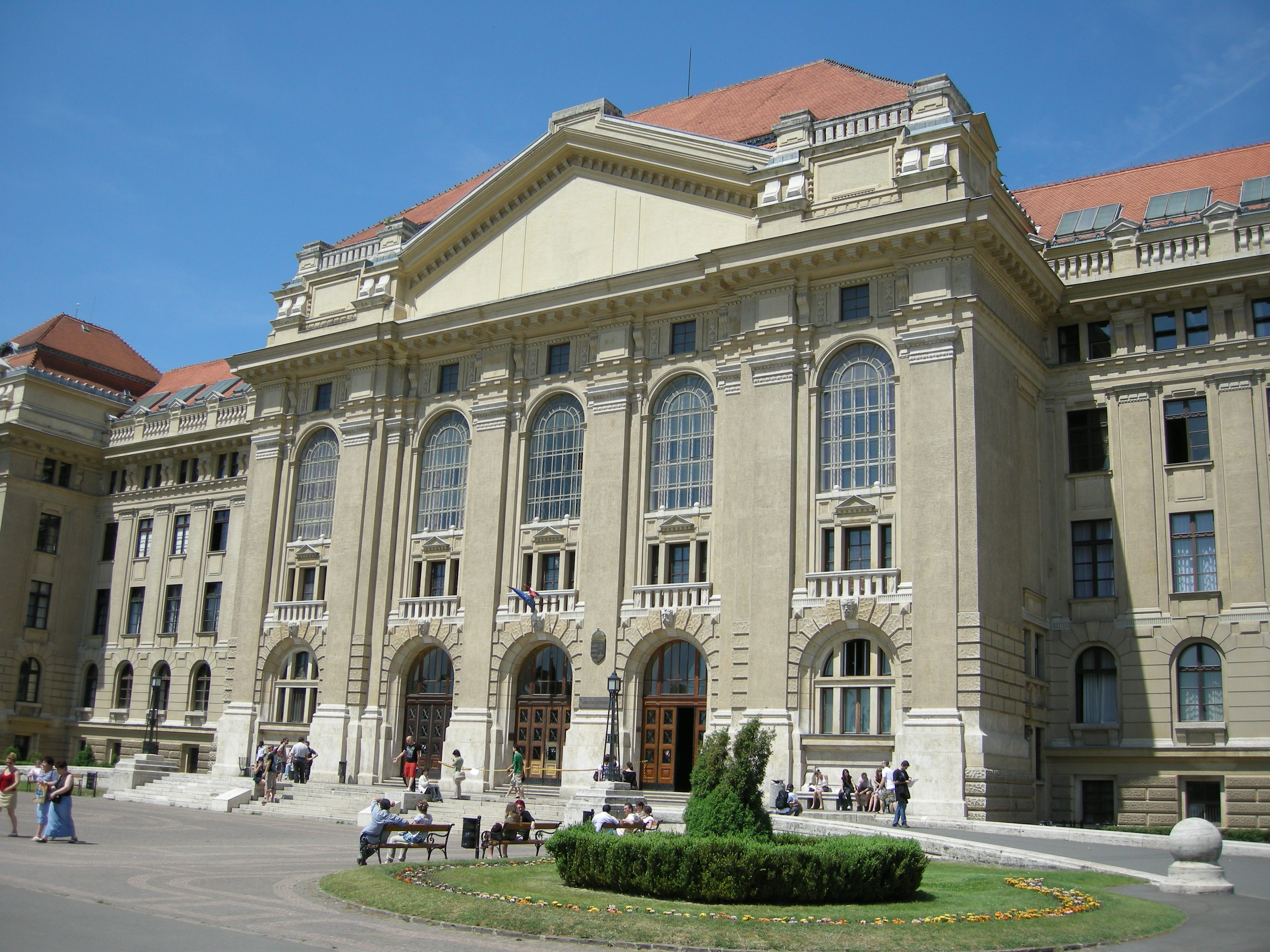
- Latin: Universitas Debreceniensis
- Type: Public
- Established: 1538, 1912
- Rector: Zoltán Szilvássy
- Academic staff: 2,000
- Students: 30,000 (2020)
- Address: Egyetem tér 1, 4032, Debrecen, Hungary
- Affiliations: EUA
- Website: unideb.hu/en
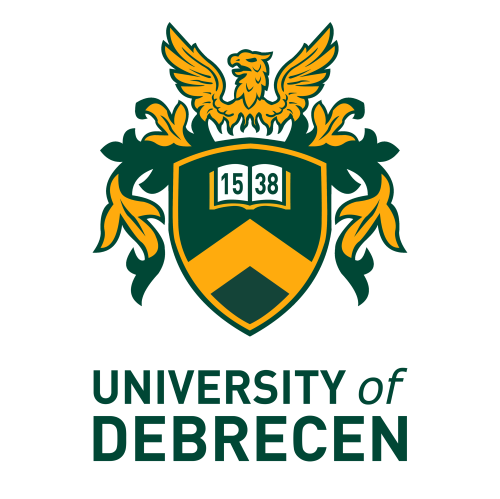

University rankings

Regional – Overall
- QS Emerging Europe and Central Asia: 40 (2022)

The University of Debrecen (Hungarian: Debreceni Egyetem [ˈdɛbrɛt͡sɛni ˈɛɟɛtɛm]) is a university located in Debrecen, Hungary. It is the oldest continuously operating institution of higher education in Hungary ever since its establishment in 1538. The university has a well established programme in the English language for international students, particularly in the Medical and Engineering field, which first established education in English in 1886. There are nearly 6000 international students studying at the university.

Until 2014 technical Academy Awards (Oscars) have been awarded to five former students.

The university also operates an associated Basic Medicine campus in Geochang County, South Korea.

== History ==
=== The early formation ===
Higher education began in Debrecen with the Calvinist College of Debrecen, which was founded in 1538. Over centuries of its existence it was one of the key institutions of higher education in Hungary. In the beginning of the 20th century the college was transformed into a university, and has a strong link and cooperation with the present Calvinist College's Debrecen Reformed Theological University.

=== Before, and during World War I ===
In 1908, the Calvinist Academy of Humanities was created, and in 1912, the Hungarian Royal University was founded. The university incorporated the theology, law, and arts faculties of the college and added a medical school. Teaching began in 1914 in the old Calvinist College buildings. In 1918, the first new medical school building was opened, and the original medical school campus was completed in 1927.

=== Between the two World Wars ===
In 1921, the university took the name of István Tisza, former prime minister of Hungary. In 1932 the university's main building was completed. It is the largest building in the city, and was designed in eclectic and neo-baroque style.

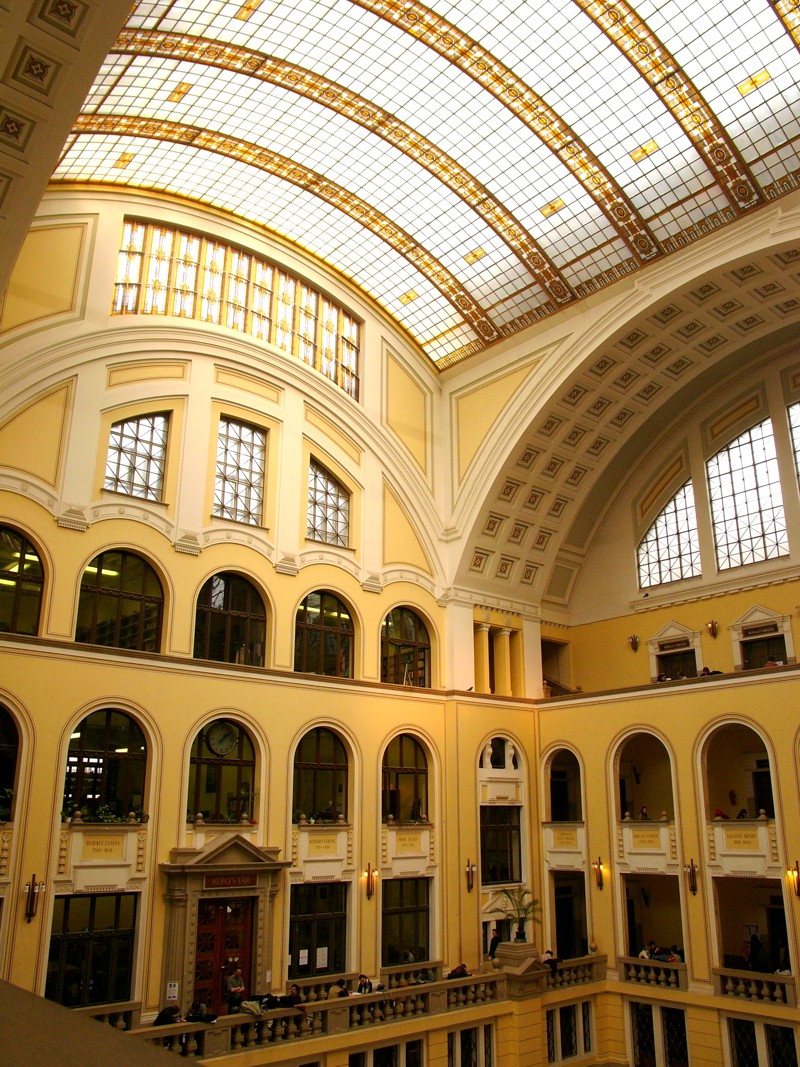
Inner yard of the main university building (Díszudvar)

=== Between 1945 and 1990 ===
In 1949/1950, the university was restructured under communist control. The primary goal of the "reorganization" was to split the university into smaller, less integrated institutions, and also to weaken or even dissolve units which did not fit to the Soviet agenda of the day. The Faculty of Theology was returned to the Calvinist College, the Faculty of Medicine became an independent university (until 2000), the Faculty of Law was discontinued, and members of the teaching staff were expelled from the university. The departments of English, French, Italian, German, and Classical Philology were closed down, while the Department of Russian expanded dramatically. The teaching of western languages resumed only after 1956, with the exception of Italian which was not offered again until the 1990s.

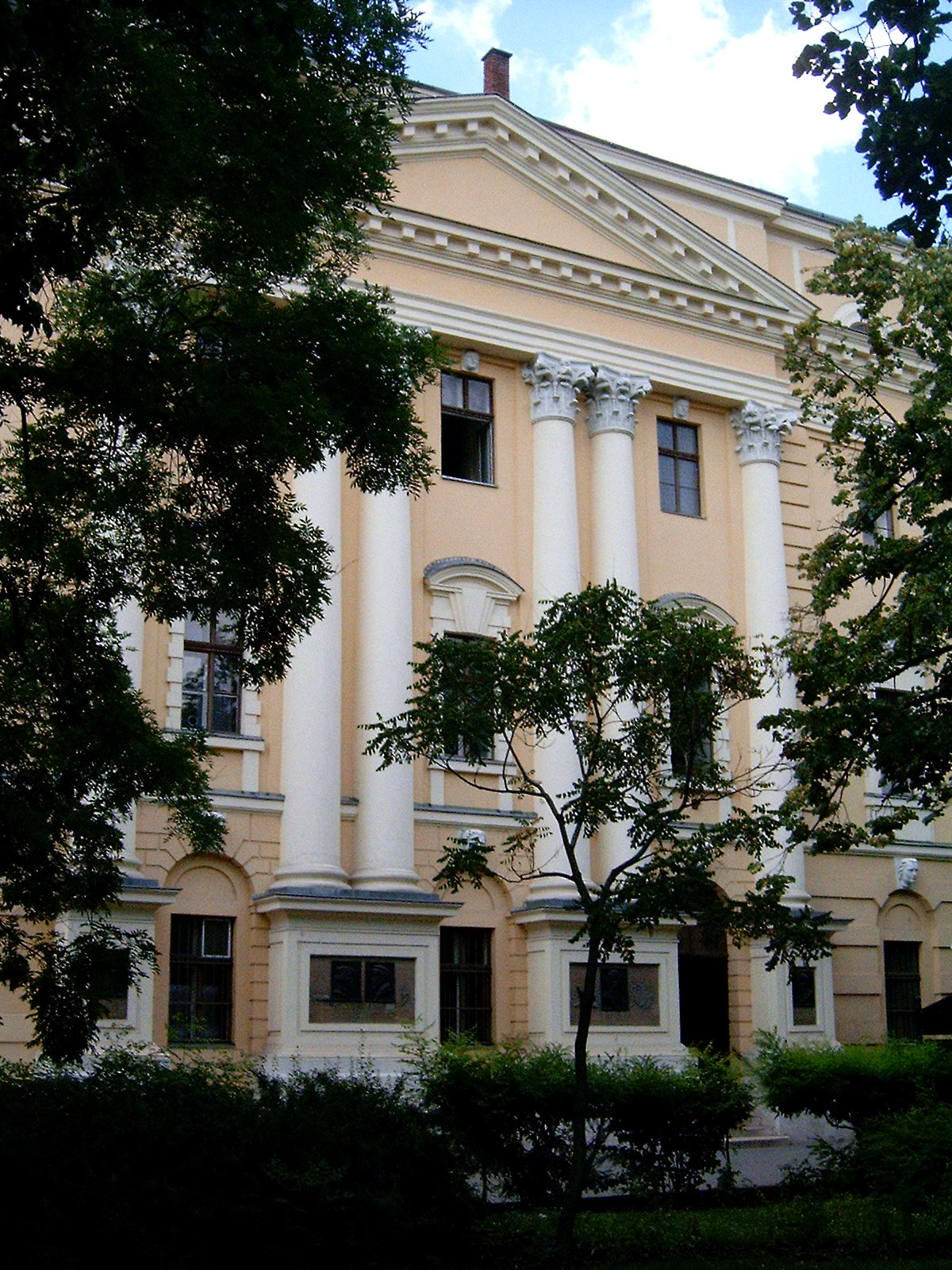
Calvinist College

The Faculty of Natural Sciences became an independent faculty in 1949, and moved into the new Chemistry Building in 1970.

In 1952 the Faculty of Arts and the Faculty of Natural Sciences changed their name to Lajos Kossuth University, which they retained until 2000.

=== 21st century ===
On January 1, 2000, the colleges and universities of Hajdú-Bihar county, the University of Agriculture, Lajos Kossuth University, and the Medical University, were combined. The resulting University of Debrecen had five universities and three college-level faculties, and 20,000 students. The Conservatory of Debrecen and schools of the university in Hajdúböszörmény and Nyíregyháza joined later.

The Debrecen Summer School, founded in 1927, is also located on campus, although it is technically independent of the university. The School teaches Hungarian culture and Hungarian as a foreign language to foreigners, year-round.

The most popular journal of the university is Egyetemi Élet ('University Life') and the leading online media of students is www.egyetemportal.hu. The university also publishes the Hungarian Journal of English and American Studies

== Structure ==
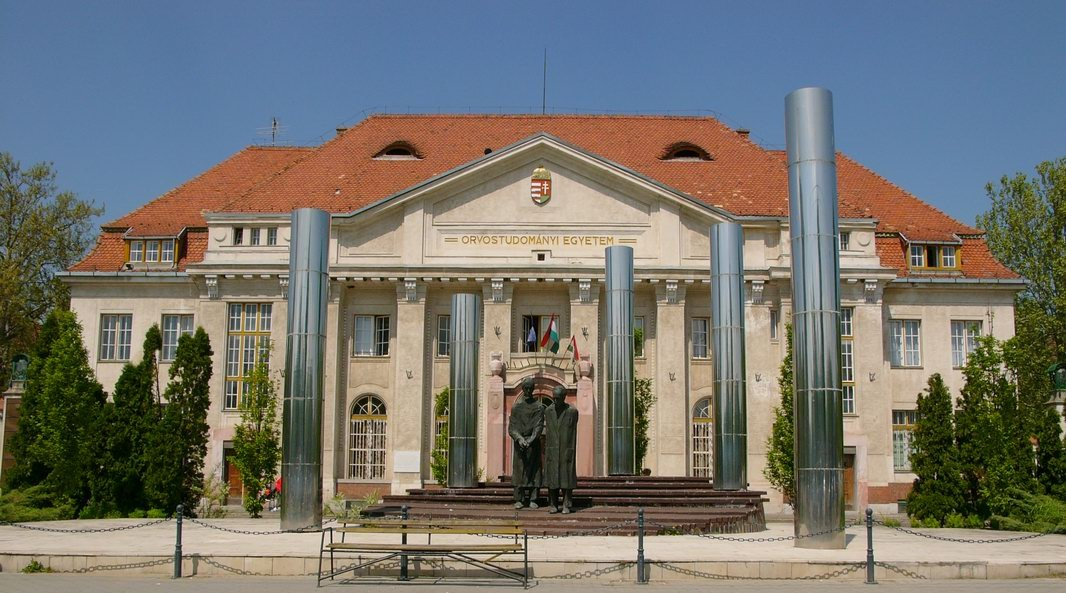
Faculty of medicine

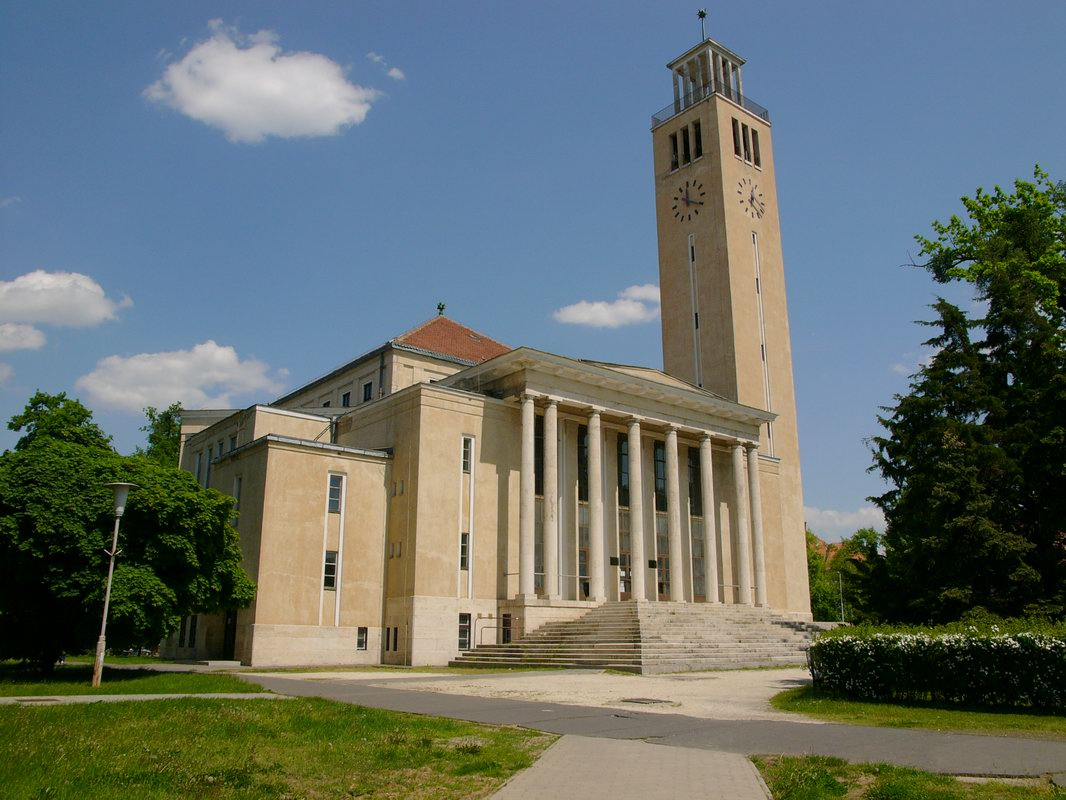
University Church

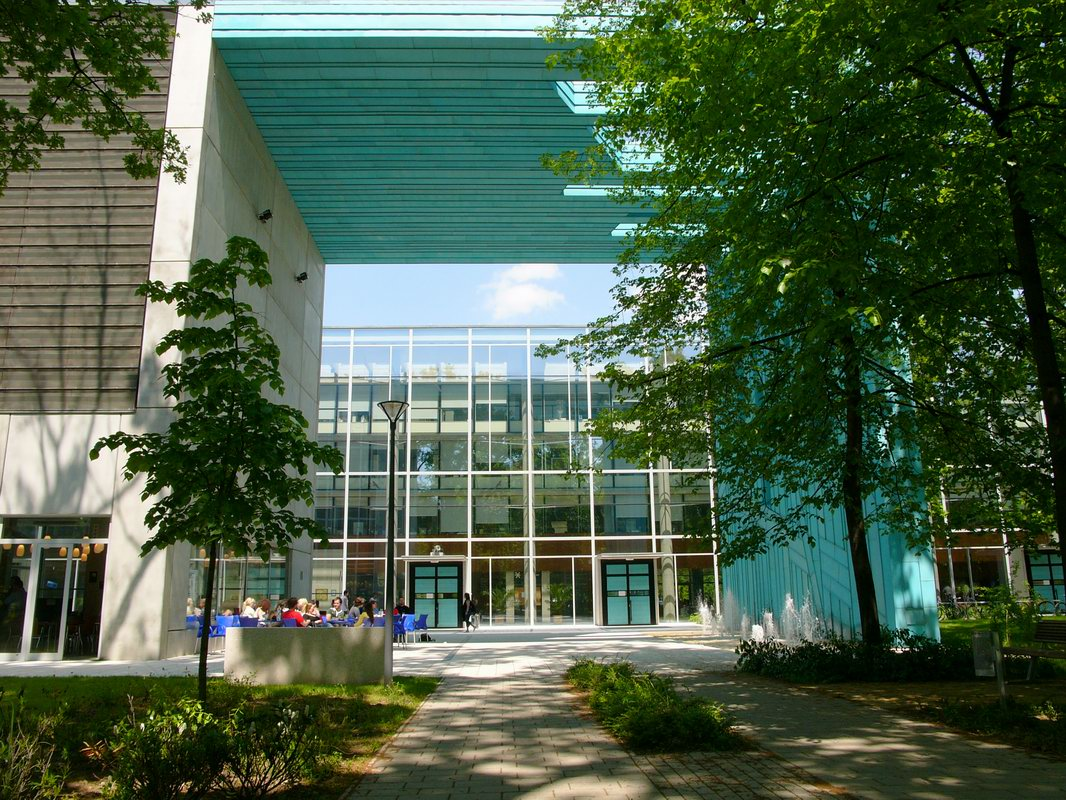
Life Sciences building

=== Faculties and colleges ===
Faculty of Agriculture and Food Sciences and Environmental Management
Faculty of Humanities
Faculty of Dentistry
Faculty of Economics and Business
Faculty of Medicine
Faculty of Informatics
Faculty of Law
Faculty of Music
Faculty of Pharmacy
Faculty of Science and Technology
Faculty of Public Health
Faculty of Engineering
Faculty of Child and Special Needs Education

=== Campus ===
The university has three major campuses in Debrecen: the older main campus, which hosts the majority of the departments of the faculties of humanities, science, medicine, music and also the botanical garden; the younger "Kassai-road campus" where most of the buildings of the faculties of law economy, and informatics are located, and the Böszörményi campus which hosts the Faculty of Agricultural and Food Sciences and Environmental Management. However, besides these, numerous smaller units are spread across the city, for example the departments of physics and the Institute of Nuclear Research of the HAS forming a compact "mini-campus", or the Faculty of Agronomy. The Faculty of Engineering also enjoys its own campus on Ótemető street.

=== Library ===
The library of the University of Debrecen is the largest university library in Hungary, and one of the two national libraries of the country (the other being the National Széchényi Library in Budapest). The number of records in the library is above 6 million.

=== Computing ===
The university hosts the largest computing cluster in Hungary (203 TFlop/s) called "Leo" (after Leo Szilard), which, as of 2015 is the 370th in the world's Top500 supercomputers. A new supercluster will be installed at 2022.

In January 2023, the Hungarian government inaugurated a new supercomputer known as Komondor located at the centre of the Government IT Development Agency (KIFU) on the campus of the University of Debrecen. This system has been ranked 300th in the world's Top500 supercomputer.

== Notable alumni and professors ==
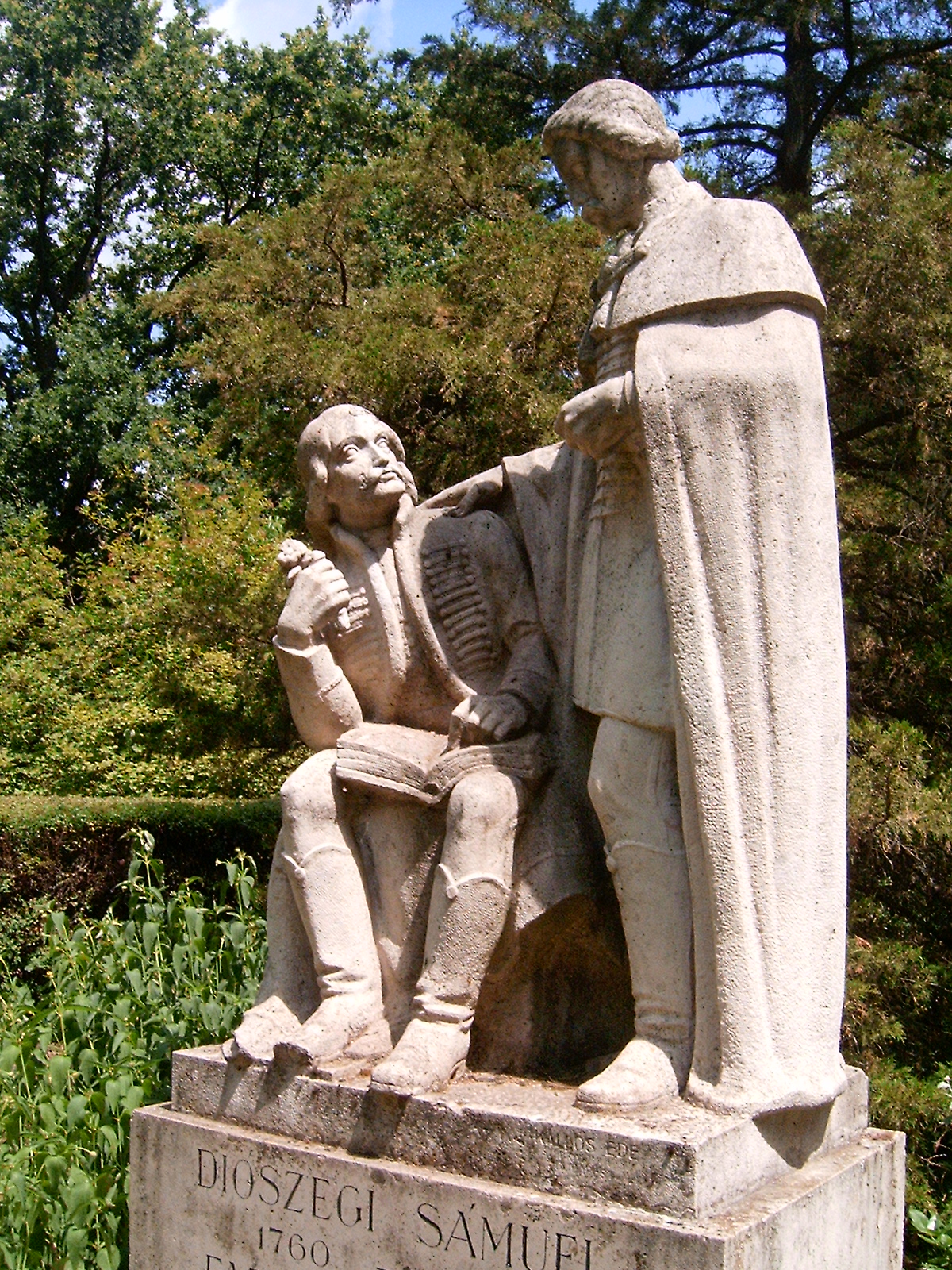
Statue of Samuel Diószegi and Mihály Fazekas

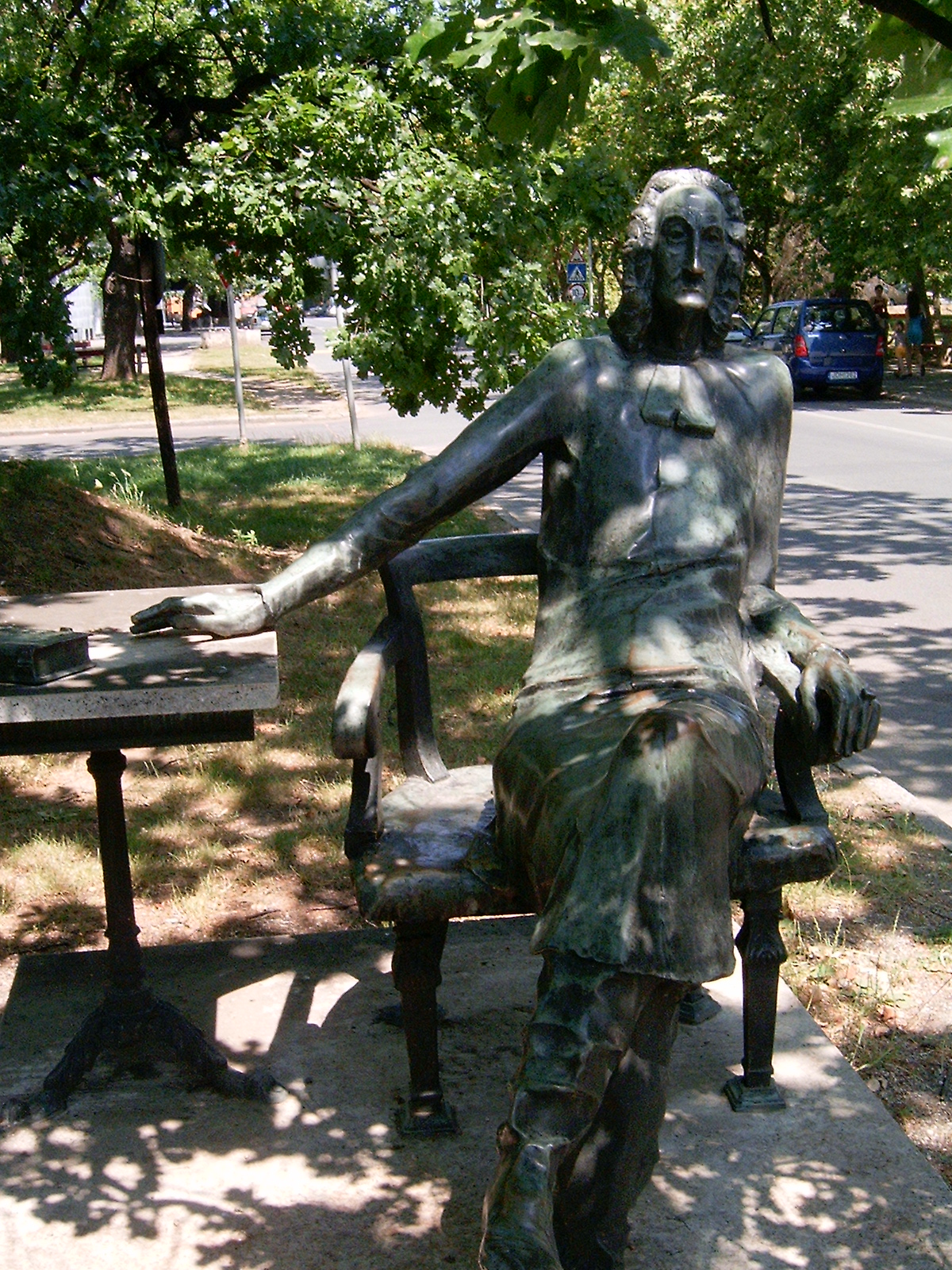
Statue of Professor István Hatvani

- Endre Ady, poet (1877–1919)
- János Arany, writer and poet (1817–1882)
- Ézsaiás Budai, professor of humanities and theology (1766–1841)
- Mihály Csokonai Vitéz, poet (1773–1805)
- Mihály Fazekas, writer, botanist (1766–1828)
- István Hatvani, mathematician (1718–1786)
- Endre Hőgyes, physician (1847–1906)
- Loránd Kesztyűs, physician, immunologist, and pathophysiologist (1915−1979)
- Ferenc Kölcsey, poet and politician (1790–1838)
- Imre Lakatos, mathematician and philosopher (1922–1974)
- Ferenc Medgyessy, sculptor (1881–1958)
- Zsigmond Móricz, writer (1879–1942)
- Alfréd Rényi, mathematician (1921–1970)
- Magda Szabó, writer (1917–2007)
- Sandor Szalay, physicist (1909–1987)
- Andor Szentiványi, physician (1926–2005)
- Tamás Vicsek, professor of physics
- Kálmán Varga, physicist
- Zsuzsanna Jakab, WHO Regional Director for Europe (2010–2014; 2015–2019)

== Gallery ==
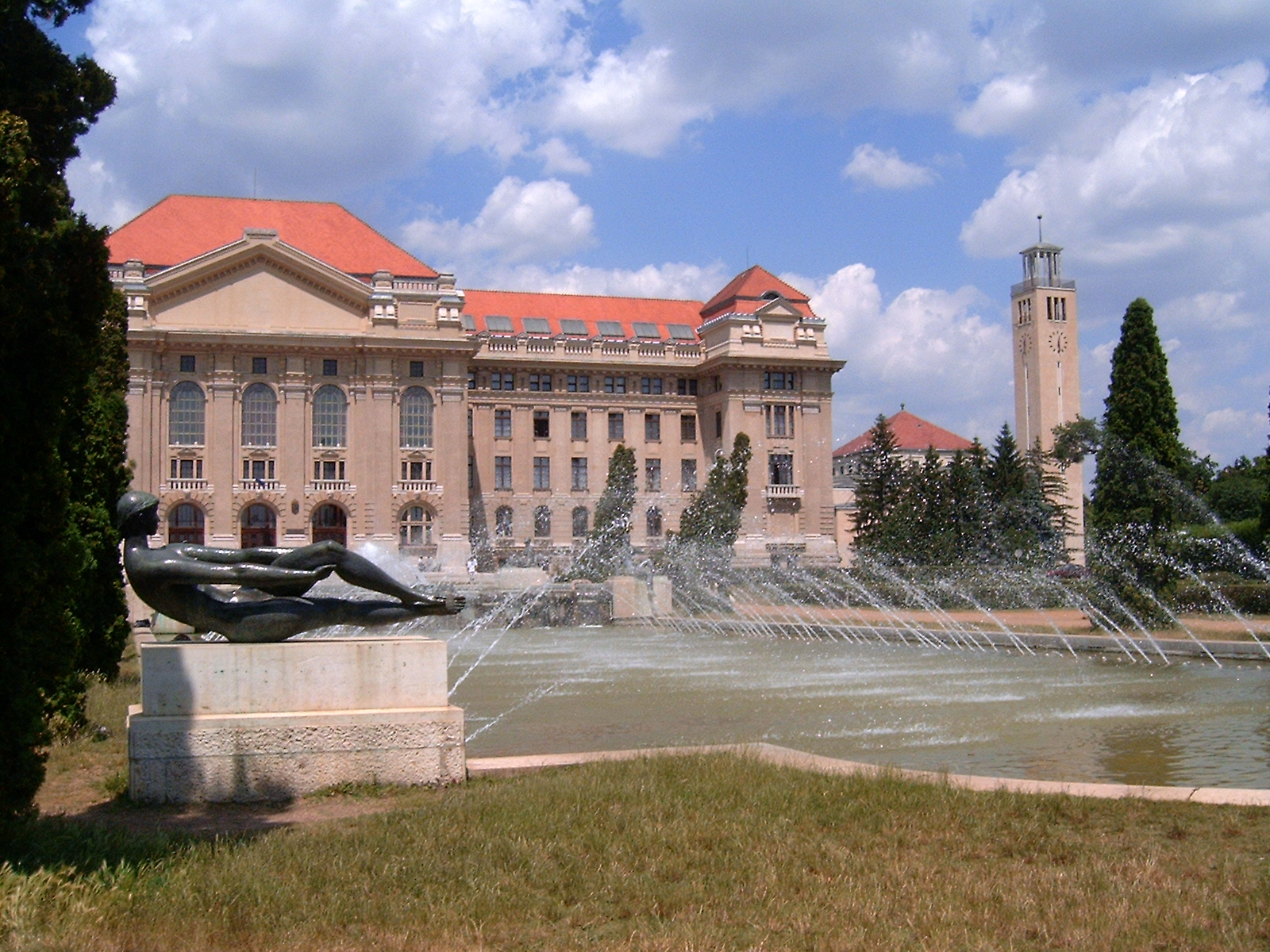
Main building

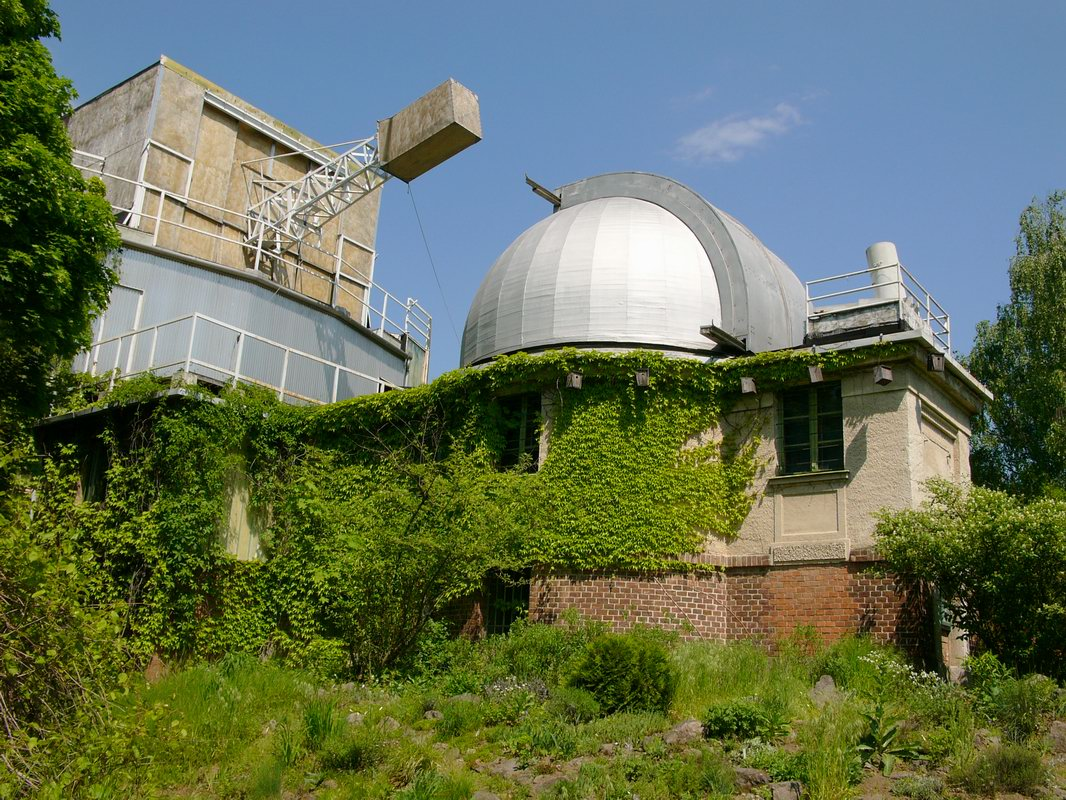
Solar Physics Observatory

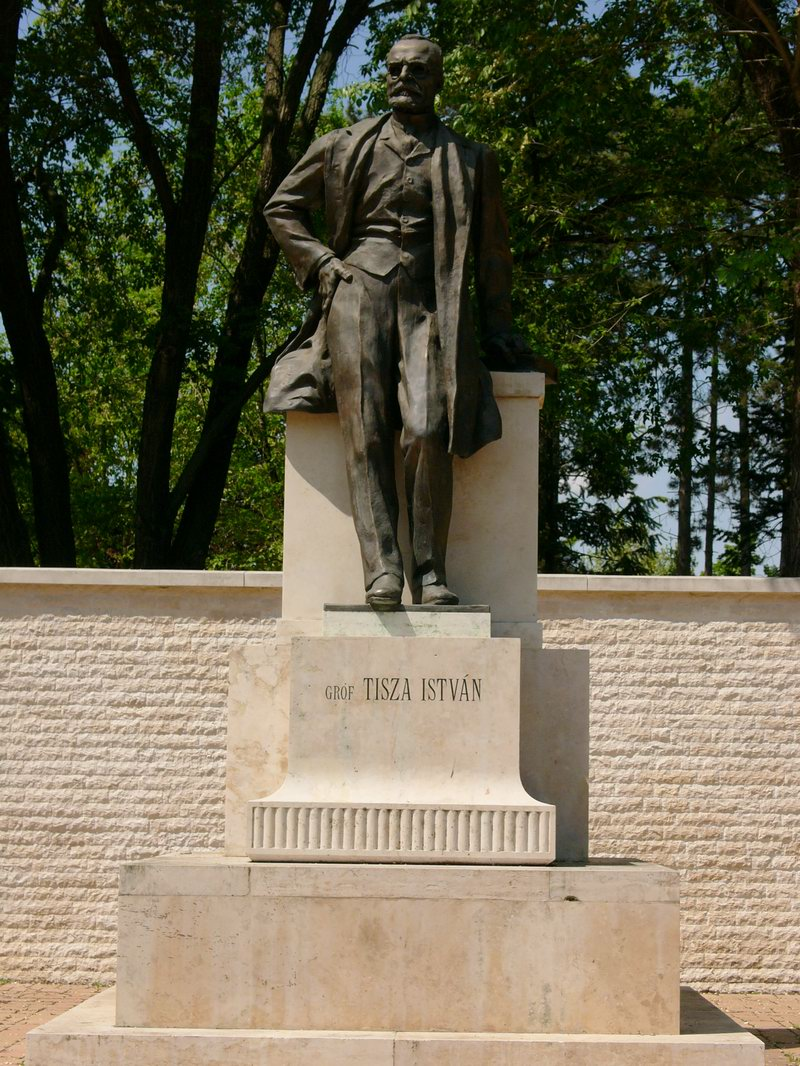
Statue of István Tisza

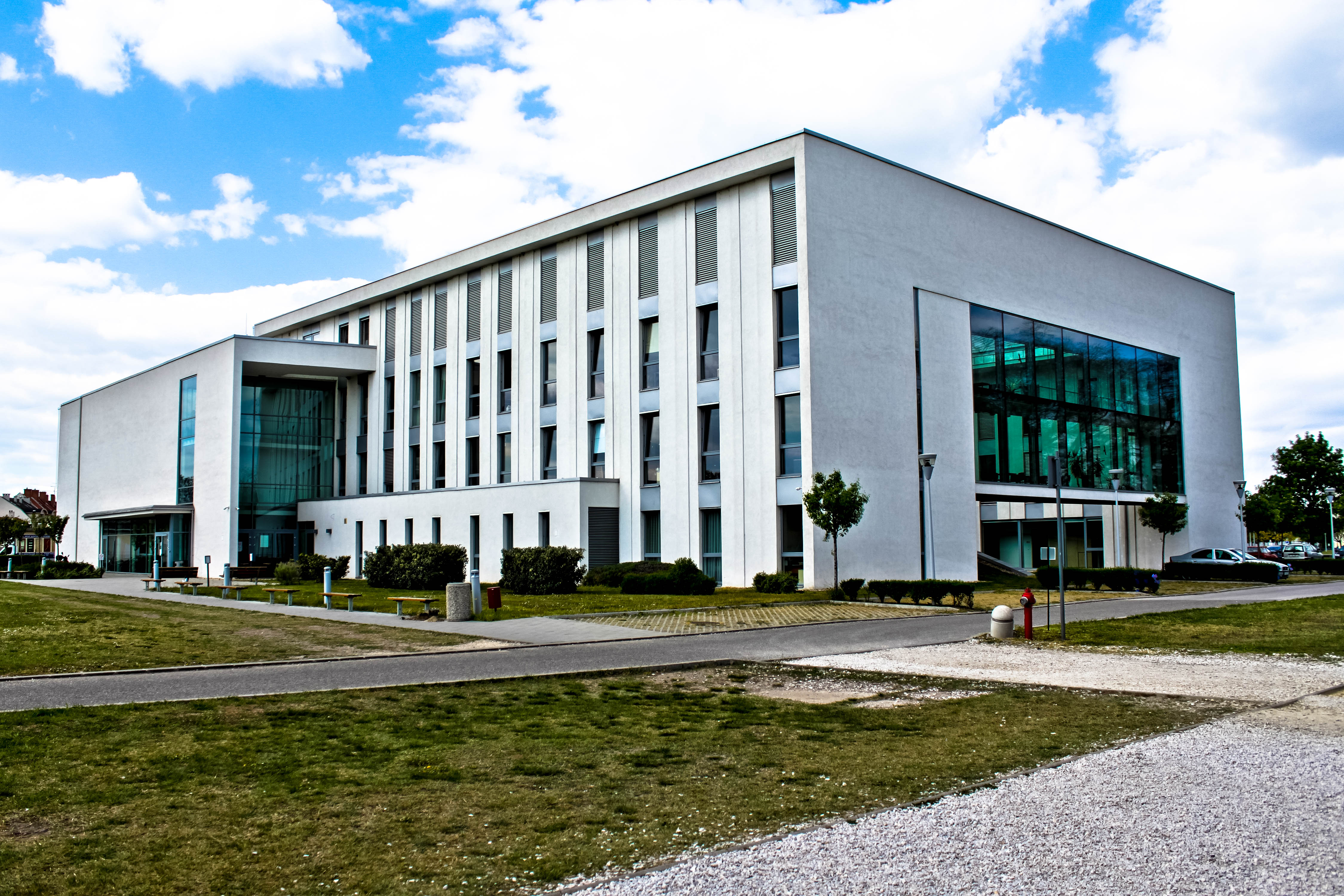
University of Debrecen - Faculty of Informatics

== See also ==
- List of modern universities in Europe (1801–1945)
