= Buday =

Buday (IPA: [of buda], literally "of Buda"), is the Magyar surname of several people:

- Dénes von Buday (1890–1963), Hungarian composer
- Attila Buday (born 1974), Canadian flatwater canoeist
- Ferenc Buday (born 1951), Hungarian handball player
- Helen Buday (born 1962), Australian actress
- Tamas Buday Jr. (born 1976), Canadian flatwater canoeist
- Zoltán Buday (born 1952), Hungarian-Canadian actor

== See also ==
- Buda
