= Debrecen Reformed Theological University =

Coordinates: 47°32′3″N 21°37′35″E

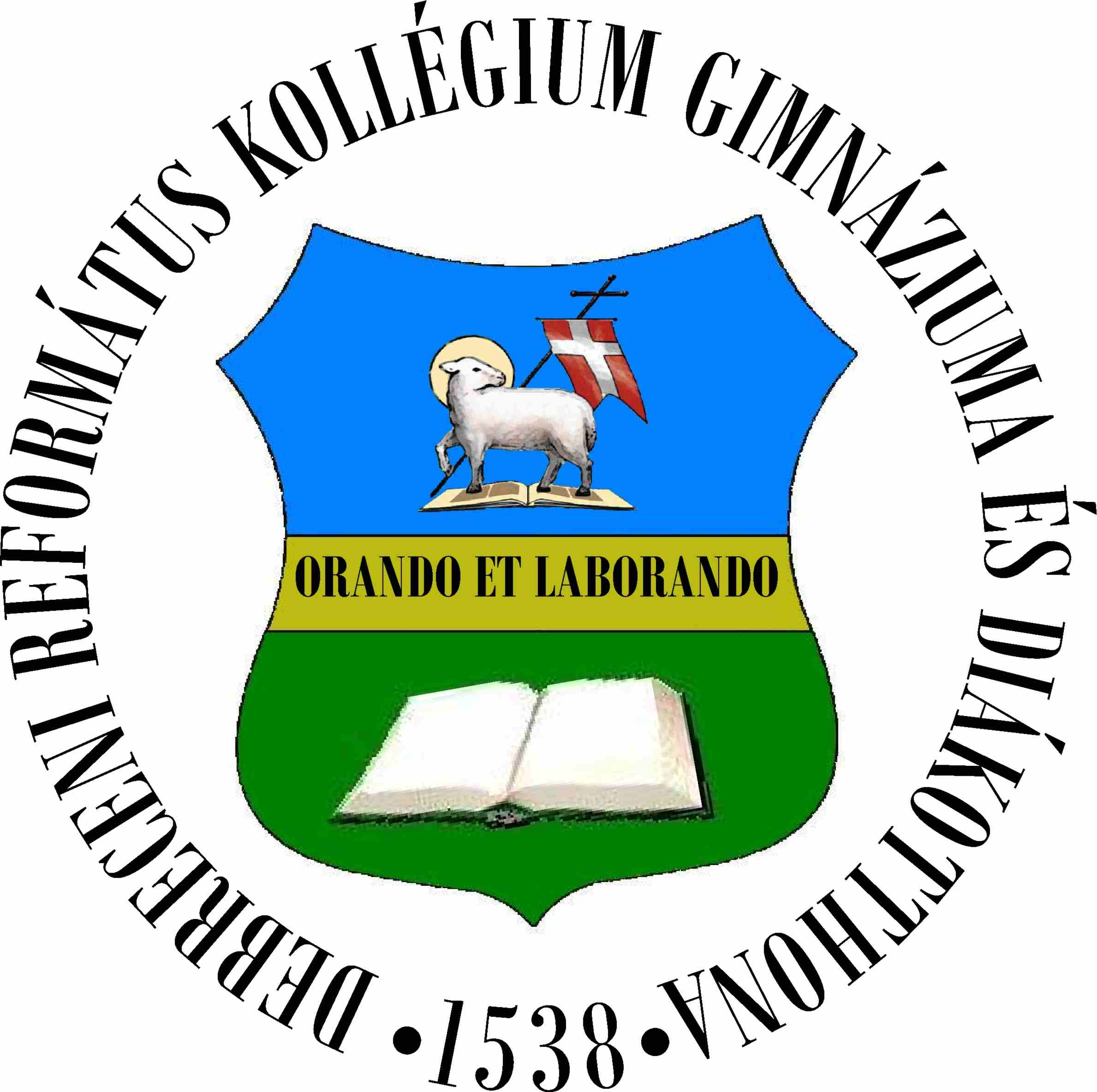
- Motto: Orando et Laborando
- Motto in English: Praying and Working
- Type: Church university
- Established: 1538; 488 years ago
- Affiliations: 'Universitas Association' of Debrecen
- Rector: Károly Fekete
- Students: 1,200
- Location: Debrecen, Hungary
- Campus: Urban
- Website: drhe.hu

The Debrecen Reformed Theological University (Hungarian: Debreceni Református Hittudományi Egyetem), in English translation also known as Debrecen University of Reformed Theology (but the first form is the official English name) is the successor of the Debrecen Reformed College (founded in 1538). The University is one of the Hungarian centers for Protestant theological training, with a major interest in training ministers for the Reformed Church in Hungary. In September 2011, the Ferenc Kölcsey Teacher Training College of the Reformed Church was integrated into the University.

== History ==
=== Debrecen Reformed College ===
Theology was taught in the Debrecen Reformed College (Debreceni Református Kollégium in Hungarian) right from its foundation in 1538. In a document from the general synod of the Reformed Church is talking about the high expectations to theological training in the institute:

"As the schools are gardens of the church (seminarium ecclesiae)... the languages, Latin and Greek grammar (as well as Hebrew, if possible), dialectics, rhetorics, and the free arts should be taught, these are necessary for theological studies. Then theology and the Scriptures are also to be presented to the students..."

The college educated generations of ministers to the Calvinist parishes in Hungary and Transylvania in the past almost five centuries.

=== Faculty of Reformed Theology ===
The Hungarian Parliament – based on the existing higher education of the Reformed College – founded the Hungarian Royal University of Debrecen in 1912 (now University of Debrecen), which was settled in the building of the College. One of the three sections of this new institute was the Faculty of Reformed Theology. In the following decades the University had various names (according to the dominating political directions) but the theological training remained within the university until the rule of the Communist Party.

=== Academy of Theology ===
In 1949, in the first year of the Communist Regime in Hungary, the theological faculty separated from the University of Debrecen, and continued as Debrecen Reformed Theological Academy, funded by the Reformed Church in Hungary.

=== Theological University ===
The Academy changed its name after the Change in Hungary (1989) and became the Debrecen Reformed Theological University, founder member of the 'Universitas Association' of Debrecen (which contained all universities of the city) in 1991 , and is still in association with the University of Debrecen.

On 1 September 2011 the Ferenc Kölcsey Teacher Training College of the Reformed Church integrated into the University. The decision by the Reformed Church was made in 2010 and the process of integration has started in the same year.

Therefore, currently the university has two campuses, four institutes, eighteen departments and 1,200 students studying in its Bachelor, Master and Doctorate programs.

== Campuses ==
=== Main Building on Calvin Square ===
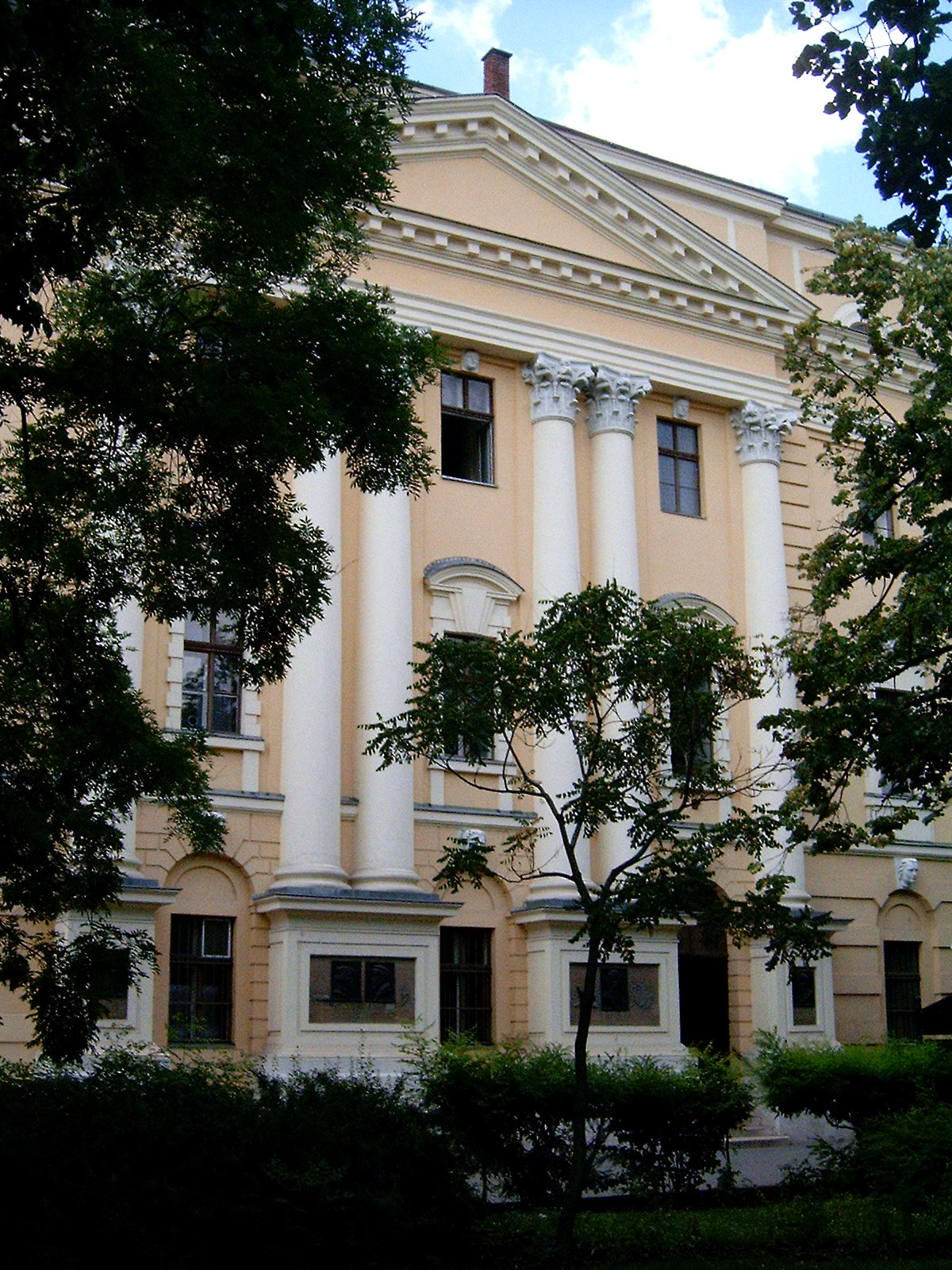
Main Building of the University

The Main Building is built at the same location as the very original Reformed College's building from the 16th century. It is located on Calvin Square, in the very heart of the city of Debrecen, right behind the Great Church on Kossuth Square.

This building is the home of two institutes: the Institute of Theology & the Institute of Applied Theology.

Institute of Theology: The institute was found in 2011, as a result of the integration. It is responsible for these courses: MA in Reformed Theology, Master of Divinity (Theology-Ministry) and the Theology Minor.

Institute of Applied Theology: The institute was also found in 2011, as a result of the integration. It is responsible for these courses: BA in Christian Education, MA in Christian Education, MA in Pastoral Care and Management of Organisations.

Departments belonging to these two Institutes:

- Department of Old Testament Studies
- Department of New Testament Studies
- Department of Biblical Theology and History of Religion
- Department of Christian Doctrine
- Department of Social Ethics and Sociology of Church
- Department of Ecclesiastical History
- Department of Practical Theology
- Department of Missiology and Ecumenical Studies

=== Péterfia Campus ===
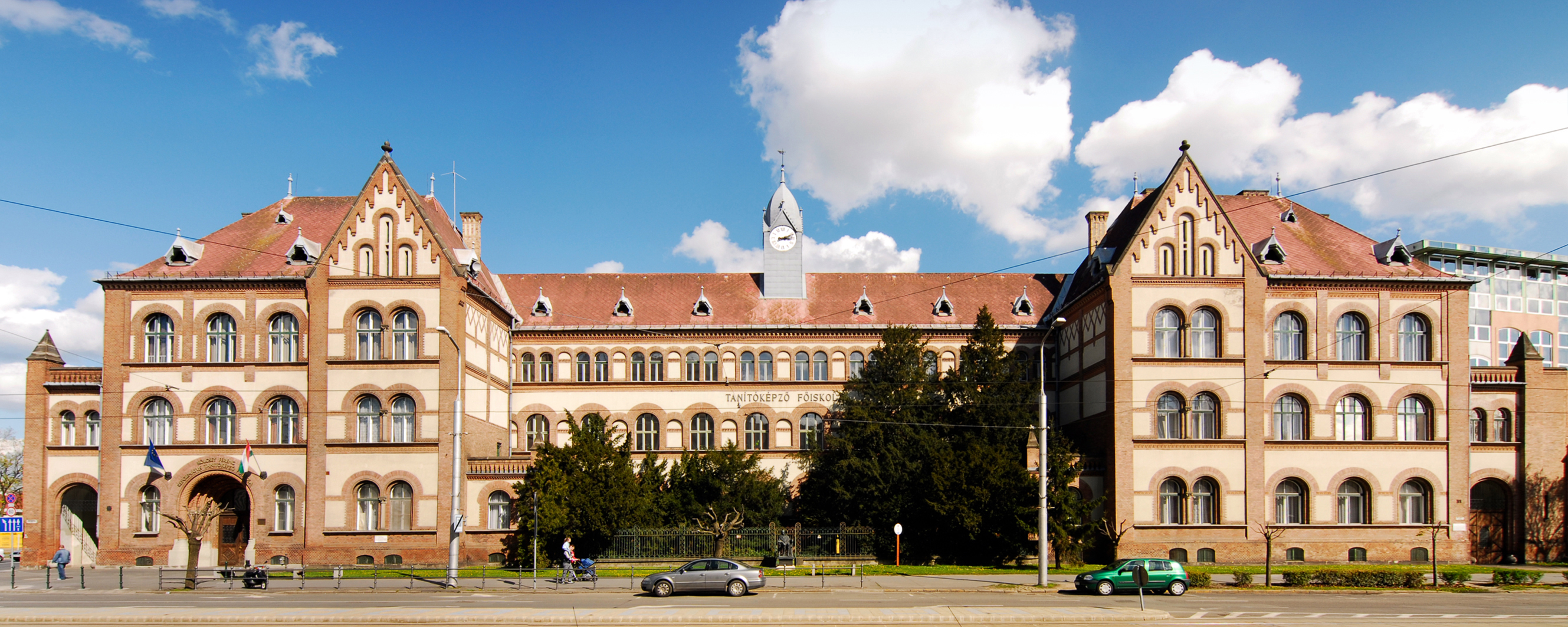
Péterfia Campus

The building of Péterfia Campus was originally the building of the Reformed Grand Grammar School, and from 1980 that of the Kölcsey Ferenc Teacher Training College of the Reformed Church. After its integration into the University, the building got the new name: Péterfia Campus. It is located very close to the Main Building, only a few yards away from Calvin Square, named after the street it faces: Péterfia. The campus is home of two institutes: Kölcsey Ferenc Institute of Teacher's Training and Institute of Communication and Social Sciences.

Kölcsey Ferenc Institute of Teacher's Training: The institute was found in 2011, as a result of the integration. Its name holds the name of the former teaching college (from before 2011), creating a continuity from its historical tradition to the presence. The institute is responsible for the BA in Primary Education course.

Departments belonging to the institute:

- Department of Pedagogy and Psychology
- Department of Hungarian Language and Literature
- Department of Foreign Languages
- Department of Art
- Department of Natural Sciences
- Department of Physical Education

Institute of Communication and Social Sciences: The institute was also found in 2011, as a result of the integration. It is responsible for these courses: BA in Communication and Media Sciences and BA in Library and Computer Science.

Departments belonging to the institute:

- Department of Communication and Media Sciences
- Department of Social Sciences
- Department of Computer Science
- Department of Library

== Academic programs at the University ==
=== Bachelor programs ===
- BA in Christian Education, 6 semesters
- BA in Primary Education, 8 semesters
- BA in Communication and Media Sciences, 6 semesters
- BA in Library and Computer Science, 6 semesters

=== Master programs ===
- MA in Reformed Theology, 10 semesters
- Master of Divinity (Theology-Ministry), 12 semesters
- MA in Christian Education, 4 semesters
- MA in Pastoral Care and Management of Organisations, 4 semesters

=== PhD programs ===
The Debrecen Reformed Theological University has PhD programs in the fields of Biblical, Systematic and Practical Theology.
