= Mąstautai =

- Village
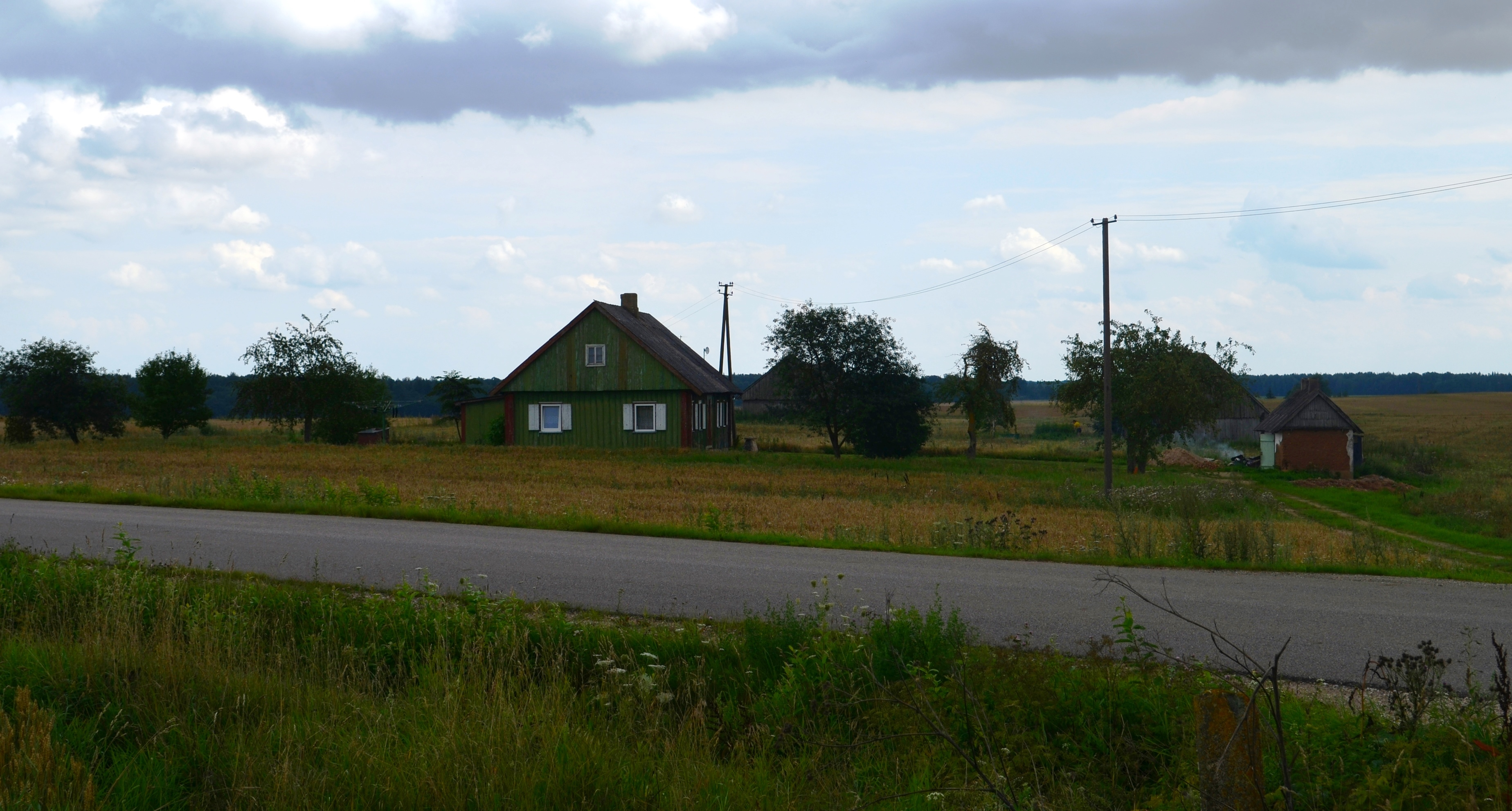

- Location in Lithuania Mąstautai (Lithuania)
- Coordinates: 55°21′40″N 23°41′31″E
- Country: Lithuania
- County: Kaunas County
- Municipality: Kėdainiai district municipality
- Eldership: Krakės Eldership

Population (2011)
  - Total: 9
- Time zone: UTC+2 (EET)
  - Summer (DST): UTC+3 (EEST)

Mąstautai (formerly Russian: Мостовты, Polish: Mostowty) is a village in Kėdainiai district municipality, in Kaunas County, in central Lithuania. According to the 2011 census, the village had a population of 9 people. It is located 2 kilometres (1.2 mi) from Pajieslys village, in the Pajieslys Geomorphological Sanctuary.

== History ==
At the beginning of the 20th century Mąstautai was an okolica, a property of the Kučiauskai, Mackevičiai and Šimkevičiai families.

== Demography ==
Historical population

Year	Pop.	±% p.a.
1902	49	—
1923	23	−3.54%
1959	25	+0.23%
1970	24	−0.37%

Year	Pop.	±% p.a.
1979	11	−8.30%
1989	8	−3.13%
2001	15	+5.38%
2011	9	−4.98%

Source: 1902, 1923, 1959 & 1970, 1979, 1989, 2001, 2011

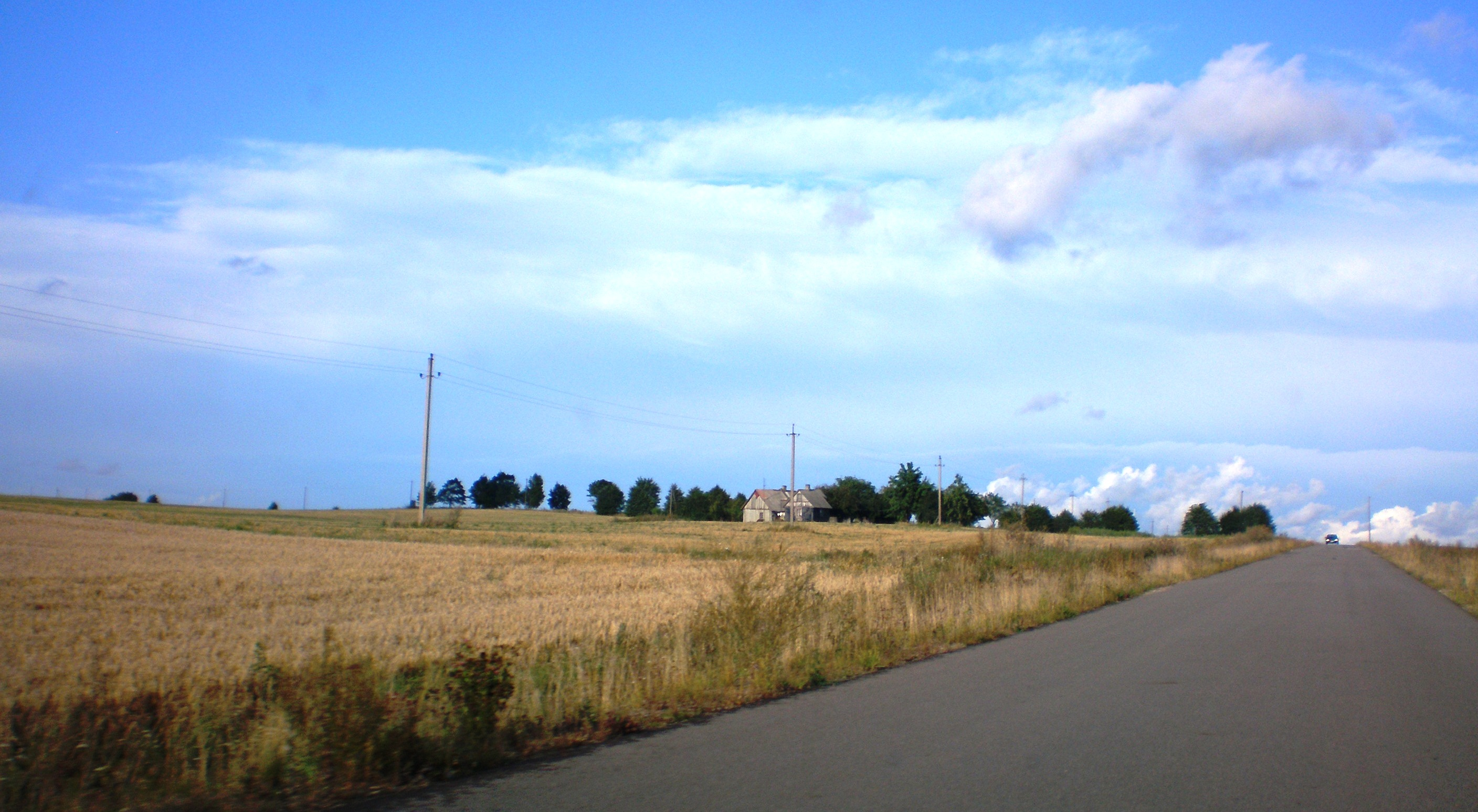
Mąstautai by the Pajieslys-Medininkai road.
