= Skinderiškis =

- Village
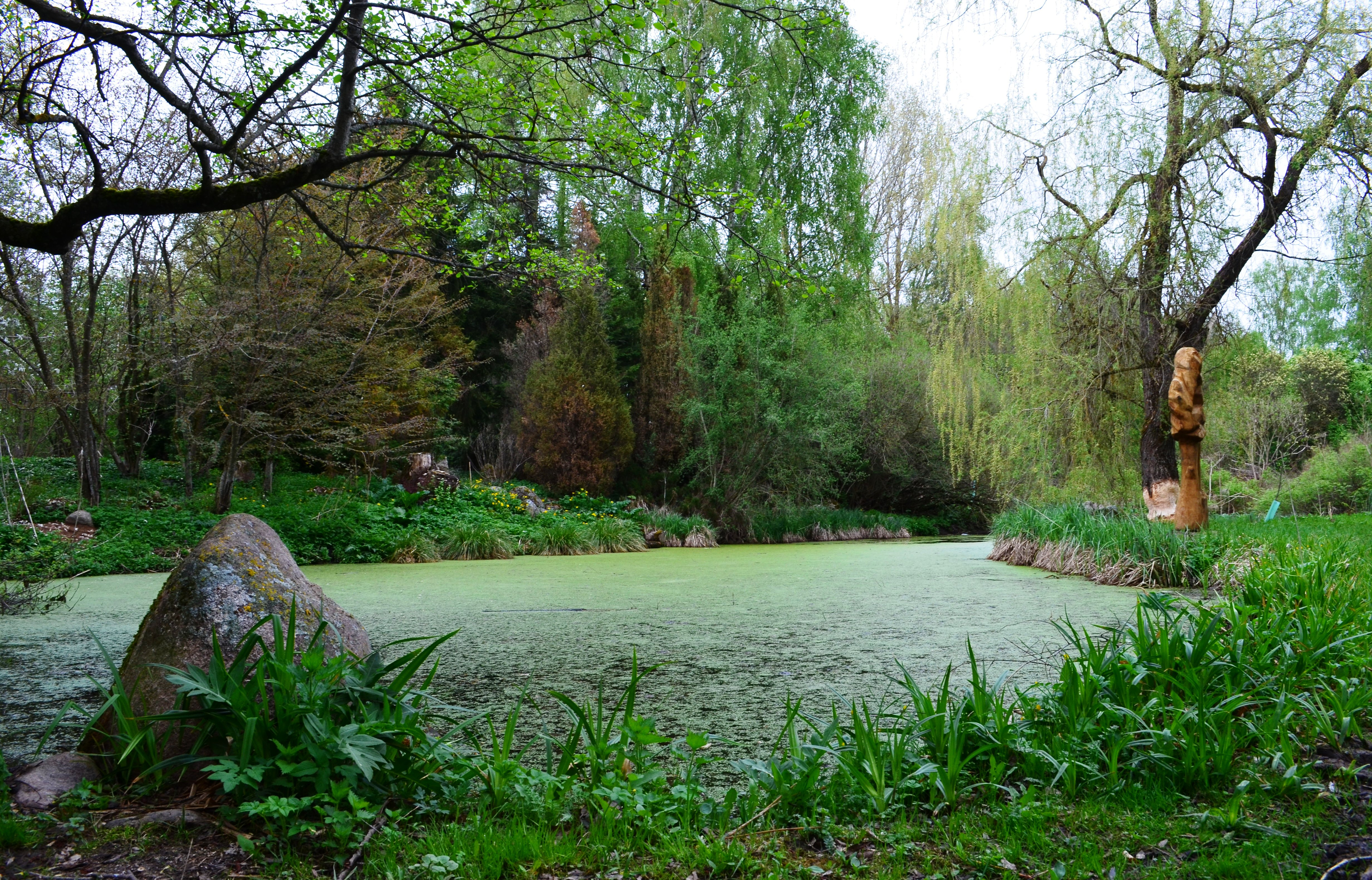

- Location in Lithuania Skinderiškis (Lithuania)
- Coordinates: 55°18′58″N 23°39′11″E
- Country: Lithuania
- County: Kaunas County
- Municipality: Kėdainiai district municipality
- Eldership: Krakės Eldership
- Time zone: UTC+2 (EET)
  - Summer (DST): UTC+3 (EEST)

Skinderiškis (formerly Russian: Скиндеришки, Polish: Skinderyszki) is a former village in Kėdainiai district municipality, in Kaunas County, in central Lithuania. It was located 3 kilometres (1.9 mi) from Pajieslys, 2 kilometres (1.2 mi) from Pilsupiai, in the Šušvė river loop. Now the area officially belongs to Pilsupiai and Užvarčiai villages. The Skinderiškis Dendrological Park is now located in a former Skinderiškis Manor site.

== History ==
At the end of the 19th century there was a Skinderiškis estate (a property of the Griškevičiai) and watermill. Skinderiškis village of Pajieslys selsovet was liquidated on 27 October 1971.

== Demography ==
Historical population
Year	Pop.	±% p.a.
1902	48	—
1923	72	+1.95%
Source: 1902, 1923
