= Diksiai =

- Village
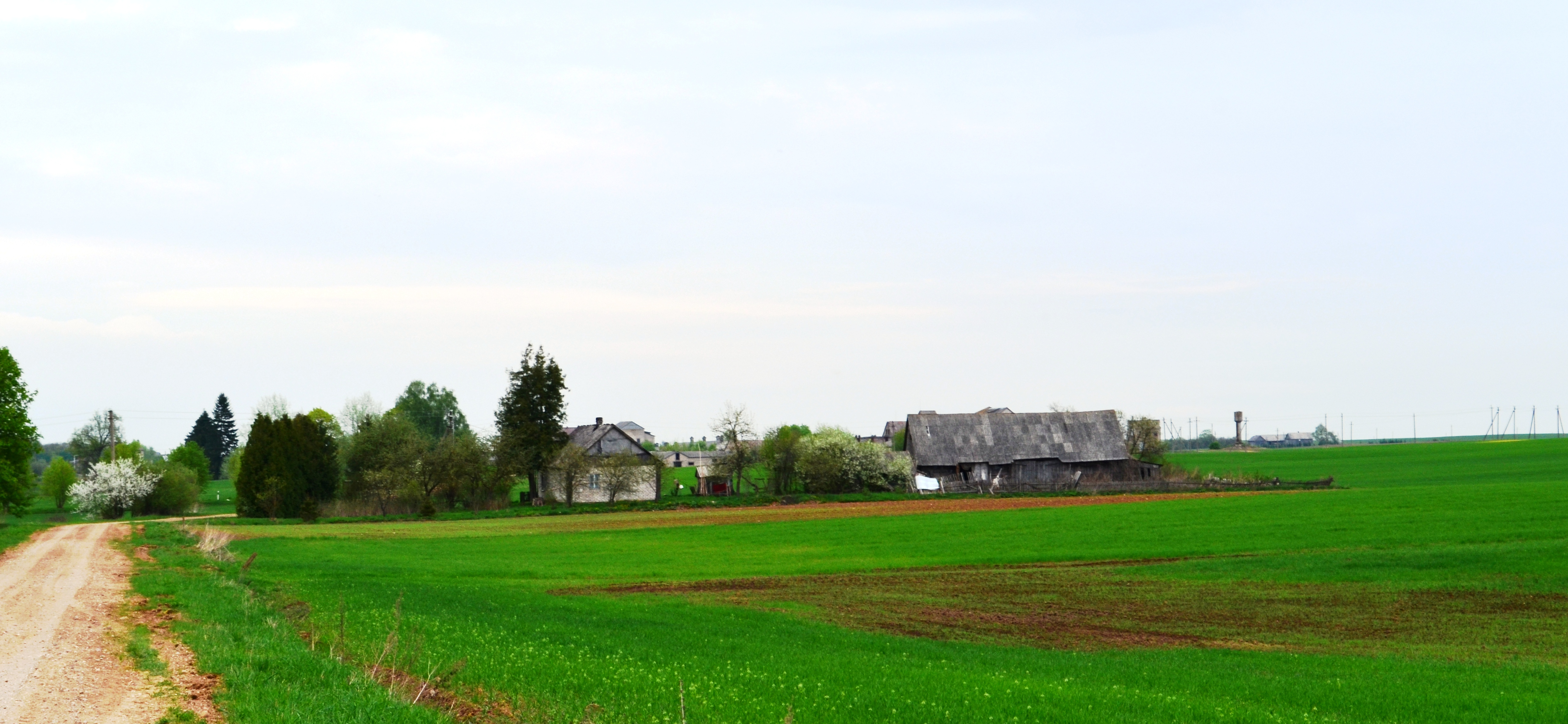

- Location in Lithuania Diksiai (Lithuania)
- Coordinates: 55°24′29″N 23°40′08″E
- Country: Lithuania
- County: Kaunas County
- Municipality: Kėdainiai district municipality
- Eldership: Krakės Eldership

Population (2011)
  - Total: 8
- Time zone: UTC+2 (EET)
  - Summer (DST): UTC+3 (EEST)

Diksiai (formerly Polish: Dyksie, Russian: Дыксце) is a village in Kėdainiai district municipality, in Kaunas County, in central Lithuania. According to the 2011 census, the village had a population of 8 people. It is located 1.5 kilometres (0.93 mi) from Pajieslys, nearby the Šušvė river. There is Pajieslys cooperative farm in Diksiai.

== History ==
Diksiai village is known since 1593. There was 4 voloks land here at that time.

At the beginning of the 20th century there was Diksiai village in Josvainiai volost, belonging to the Bulkauščiai and Goštautai families.

== Demography ==
Historical population

| Year | Pop. | ±% p.a. |
|---|---|---|
| 1902 | 9 | — |
| 1923 | 43 | +7.73% |
| 1959 | 51 | +0.48% |
| 1970 | 26 | −5.94% |
| 1979 | 20 | −2.87% |

| Year | Pop. | ±% p.a. |
|---|---|---|
| 1985 | 14 | −5.77% |
| 1989 | 9 | −10.46% |
| 2001 | 11 | +1.69% |
| 2011 | 8 | −3.13% |

Source: 1902, 1923, 1959 & 1970, 1979, 1989, 2001, 2011

== Images ==
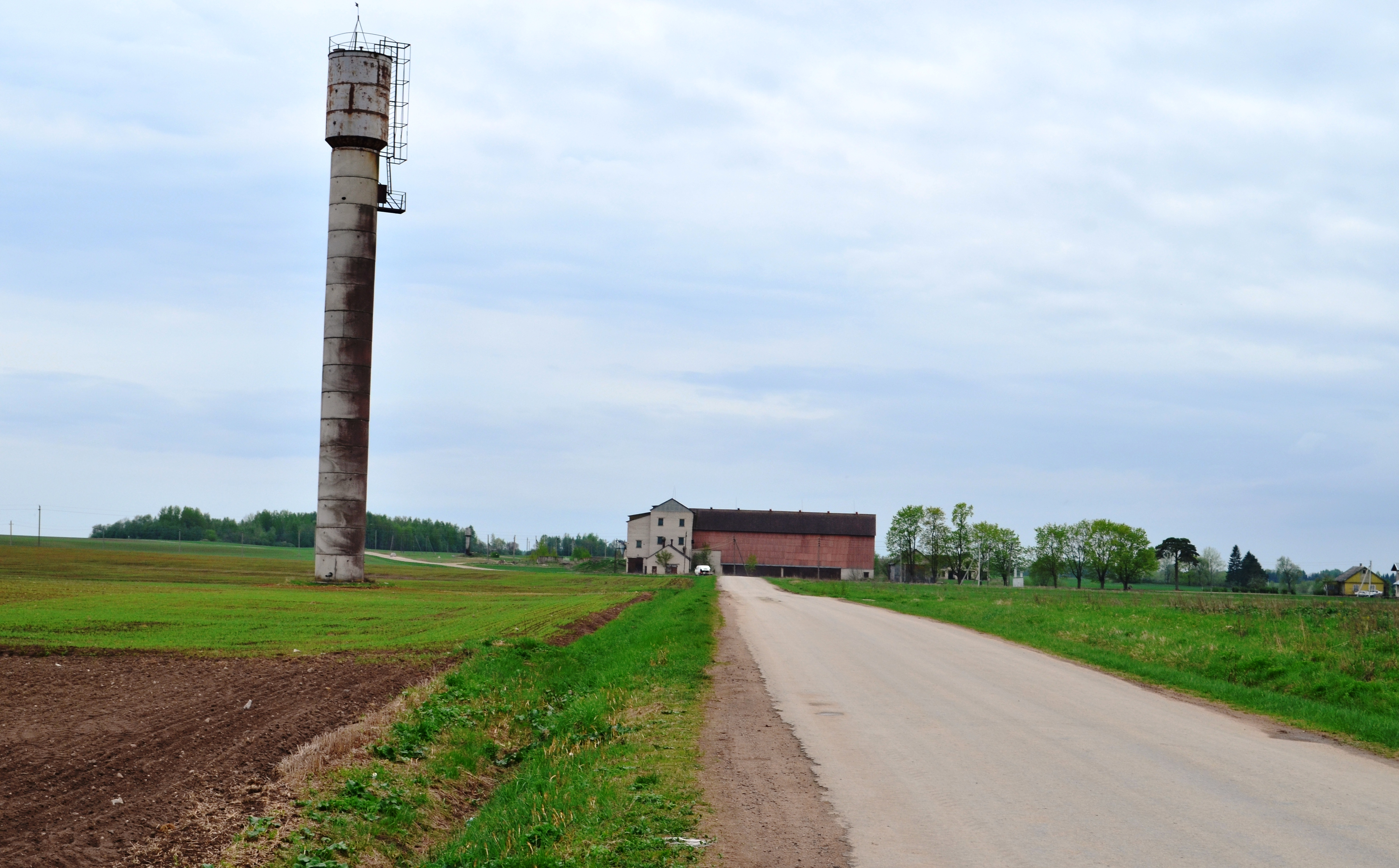
Pajieslys farm a water tower in Diksiai
