= Jurgaičiai, Kėdainiai =

Jurgaičiai
- Village
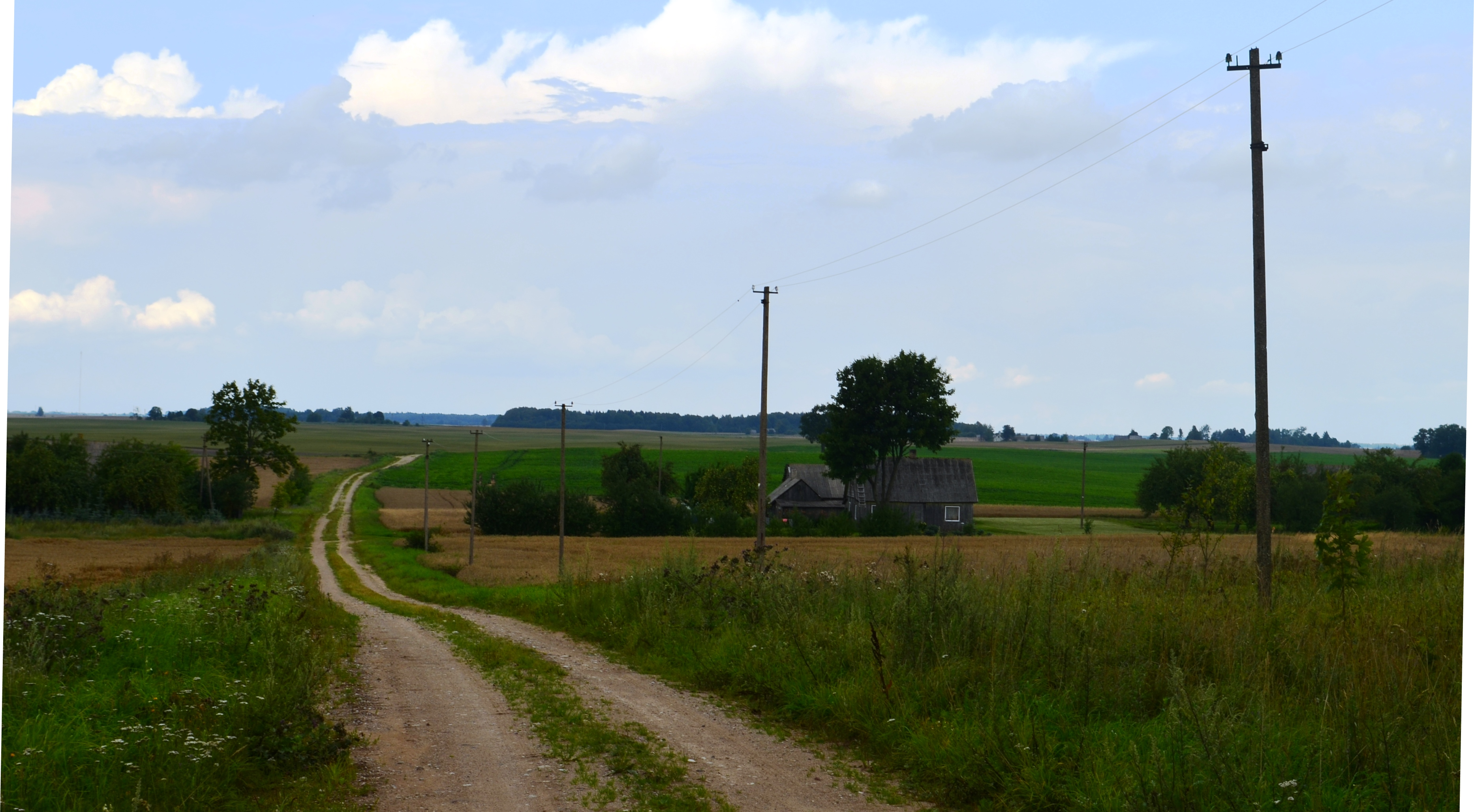

- Location in Lithuania Jurgaičiai (Lithuania)
- Coordinates: 55°21′11″N 23°40′59″E
- Country: Lithuania
- County: Kaunas County
- Municipality: Kėdainiai district municipality
- Eldership: Krakės Eldership

Population (2011)
  - Total: 7
- Time zone: UTC+2 (EET)
  - Summer (DST): UTC+3 (EEST)

Jurgaičiai (formerly Polish: Jurgajcie, Russian: Юргайци) is a village in Kėdainiai district municipality, in Kaunas County, in central Lithuania. According to the 2011 census, the village had a population of 7 people. It is located 1.5 kilometres (0.93 mi) from Pajieslys, in the Pajieslys Geomorphological Sanctuary.

At the beginning of the 20th century Jurgaičiai was an okolica, a property of the Bagdonavičiai, Ylėnai, Kelčiauskai, Krasaučiai, Kutkevičiai, Mikulšiai, Milaševičiai, Paškevičiai and Aleknavičiai families.

Archaeologist Laima Vaitkunskienė led excavations examining medieval cemeteries in the area.

== Demography ==
Historical population

Year	Pop.	±% p.a.
1902	112	—
1923	62	−2.78%
1959	44	−0.95%
1970	42	−0.42%

Year	Pop.	±% p.a.
1979	30	−3.67%
1989	18	−4.98%
2001	8	−6.53%
2011	7	−1.33%

Source: 1902, 1923, 1959 & 1970, 1979, 1989, 2001, 2011
