= Deveikiškiai =

- Village
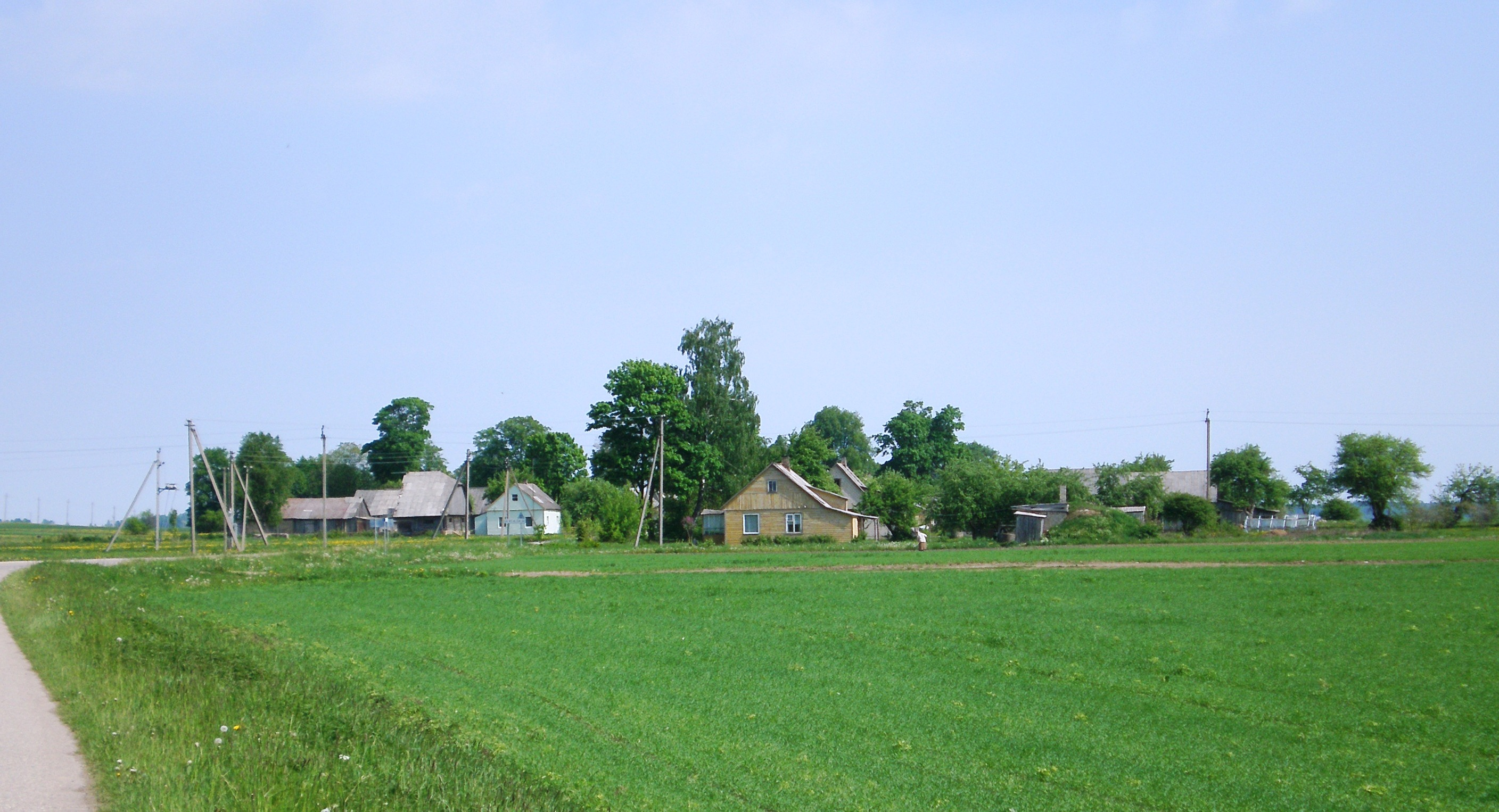

- Location in Lithuania Deveikiškiai (Lithuania)
- Coordinates: 55°20′31″N 23°42′00″E
- Country: Lithuania
- County: Kaunas County
- Municipality: Kėdainiai district municipality
- Eldership: Krakės Eldership

Population (2011)
  - Total: 35
- Time zone: UTC+2 (EET)
  - Summer (DST): UTC+3 (EEST)

Deveikiškiai (formerly Polish: Dowejkiszki, Russian: Довейкишки) is a village in Kėdainiai district municipality, in Kaunas County, in central Lithuania. According to the 2011 census, the village had a population of 35 people. It is located 7 kilometres (4.3 mi) from Krakės, 2 kilometres (1.2 mi) from Pajieslys, on the Krakės-Josvainiai road.

== History ==
At the 16th century the village was known as Deveikiai and had 20 voloks of agriculture land. In 1912 part of the village was split into solitary homesteads (Deveikiškėliai village).

== Demography ==
Historical population

Year	Pop.	±% p.a.
1902	252	—
1923	194	−1.24%
1959	129	−1.13%
1970	150	+1.38%
1979	92	−5.29%

Year	Pop.	±% p.a.
1985	75	−3.35%
1989	55	−7.46%
2001	48	−1.13%
2011	35	−3.11%

Source: 1902, 1923, 1959 & 1970, 1979, 1989, 2001, 2011

== Images ==
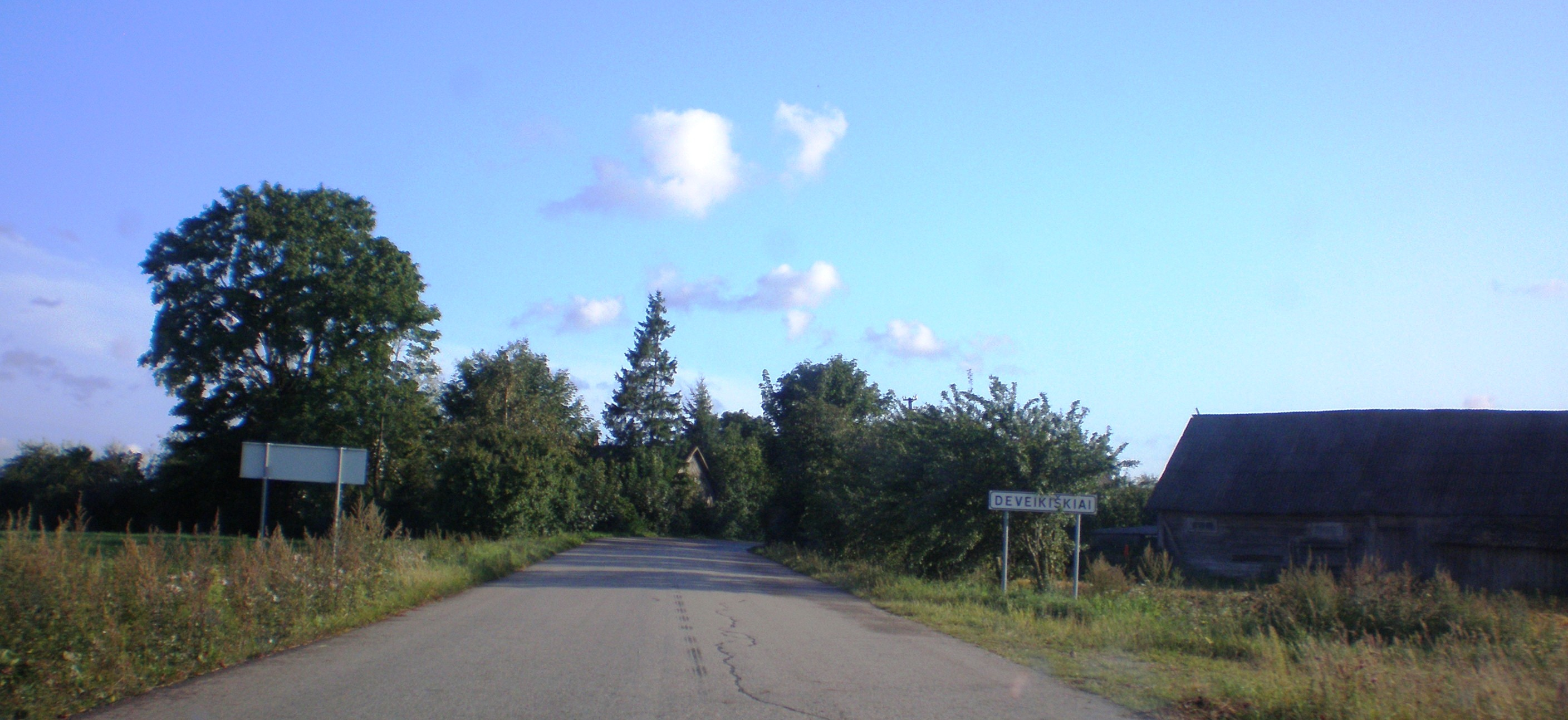
Deveikiškiai from the north

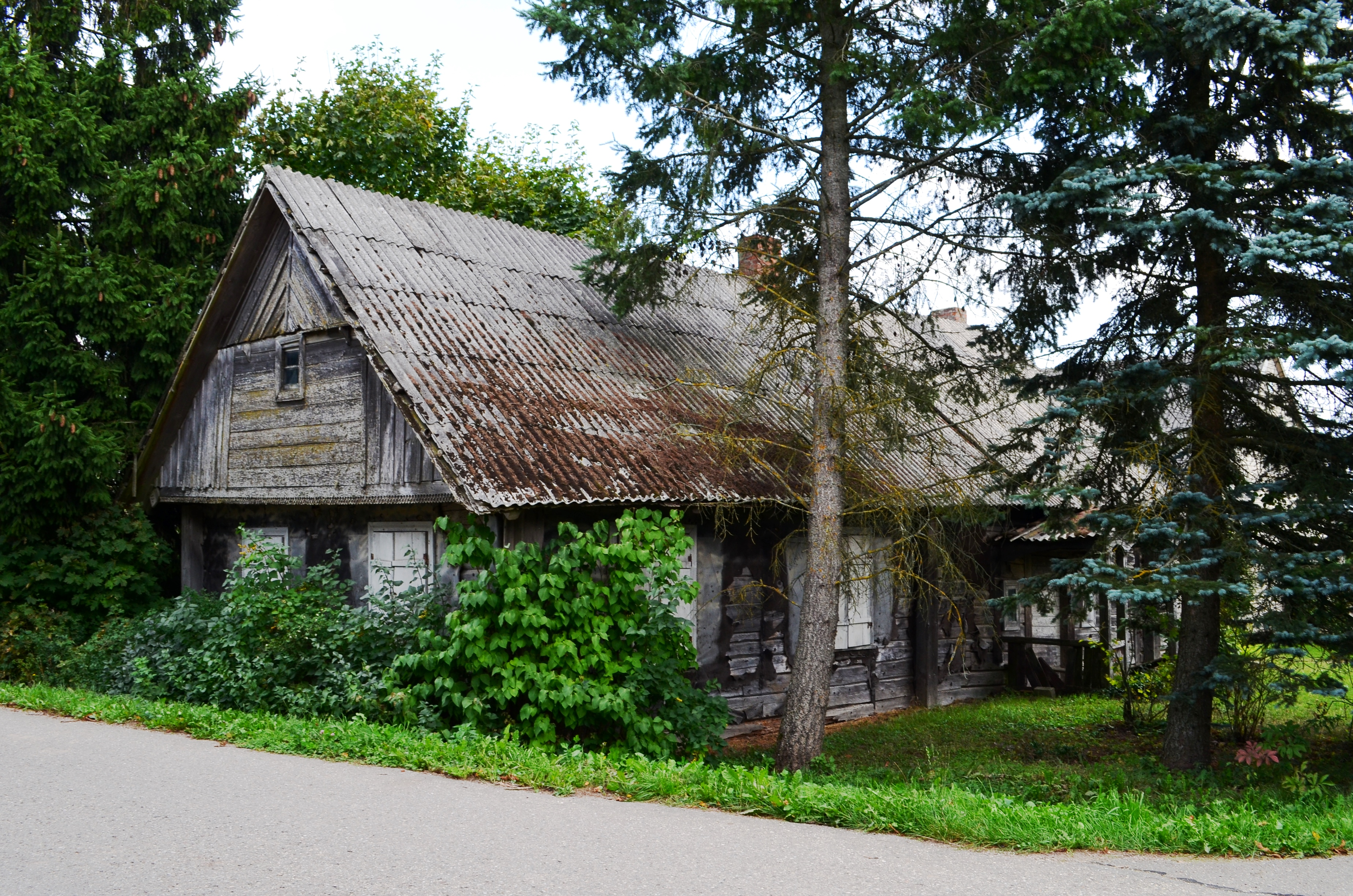
Traditional Aukštaitian house in Deveikiškiai

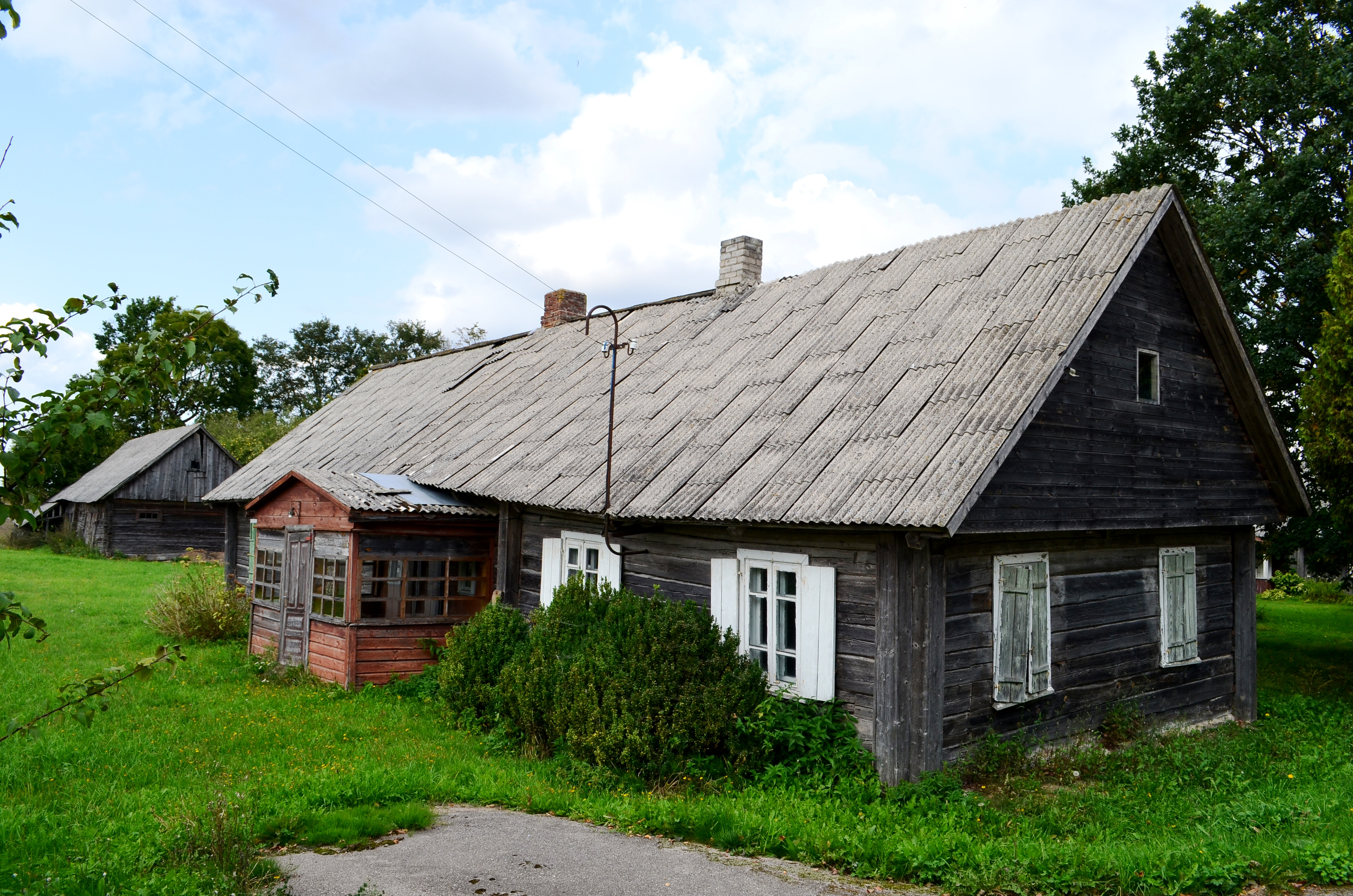
Traditional Aukštaitian house in Deveikiškiai

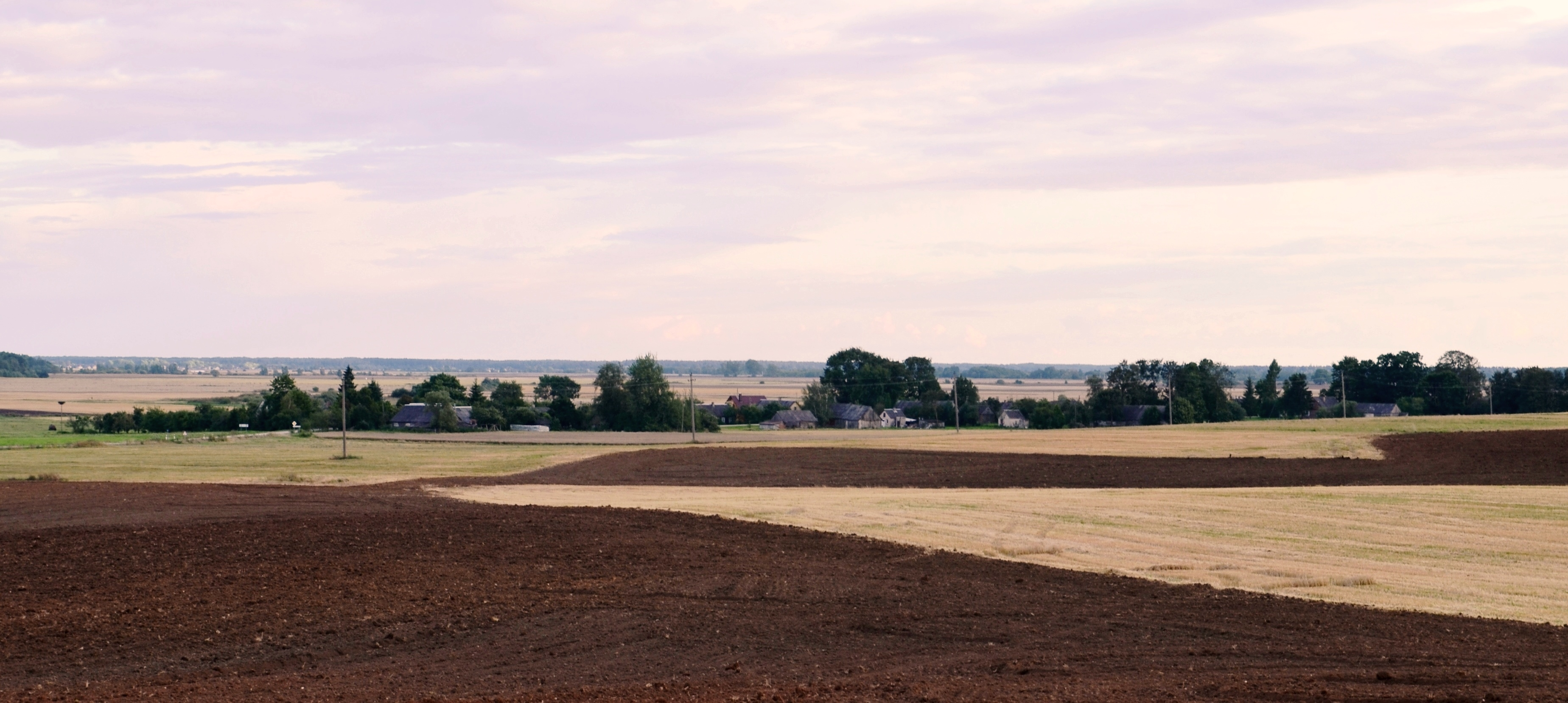
Deveikiškiai from the Pajieslys Ridge
