= Jurgaičiai =

Jurgaičiai is the name of several Lithuanian settlements:

- Jurgaičiai, Kėdainiai, Kaunas County
- Jurgaičiai, Kužiai, Šiauliai District Municipality
- Jurgaičiai, Meškuičiai, Šiauliai District Municipality
- Jurgaičiai, Šilutė, Šilutė District Municipality

Several places formerly known as Jurgaičiai are now in Kaliningrad Oblast, Russia, including:

- Kanash, Kaliningrad Oblast
- Yudino, Ozyorsky District
- Malaya Petrovka, Ozyorsky District, former village in Ozyorsky District, Kaliningrad Oblast
