= Skinderiškis Dendrological Park =

Park in Lithuania

- Skinderiškio dendrologinis parkas
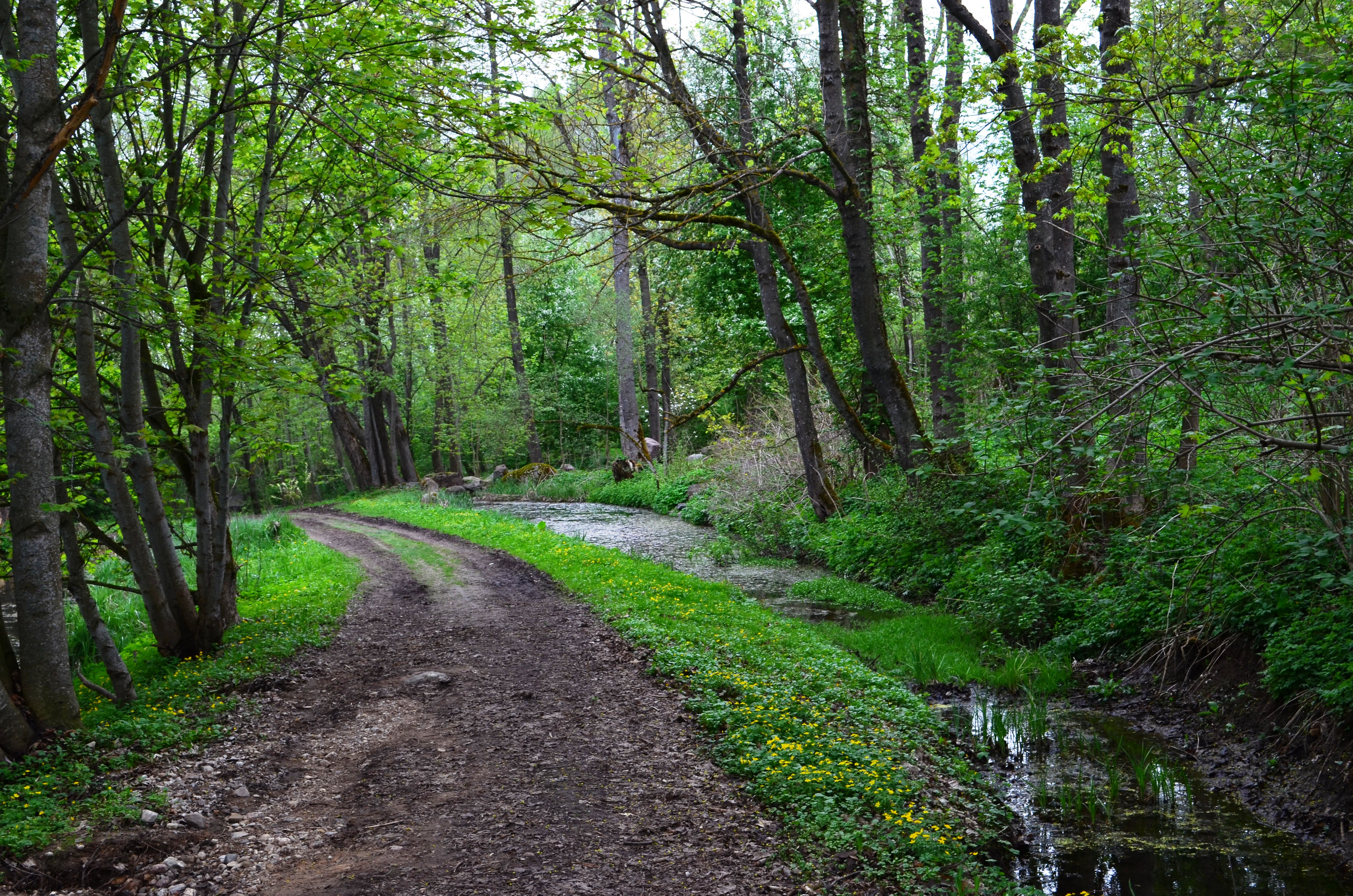

- Location within Lithuania Location within Kėdainiai District Municipality
- Interactive map of Skinderiškis Dendrological Park
- Type: arboretum
- Location: Užvarčiai (formerly Skinderiškis), Kėdainiai District Municipality, Lithuania
- Nearest city: Kėdainiai
- Coordinates: 55.316°N 23.652°E
- Area: 125 hectares (0.48 mi^{2}; 1.25 km^{2})
- Created: since 1971
- Founder: Kęstutis Kaltenis
- Owner: Lithuanian State Forest Service
- Open: any time

Skinderiškis Dendrological Park (Lithuanian: Skinderiškio dendrologinis parkas) a dendrological park (an arboretum) located in a former Skinderiškis manor site (now part of Užvarčiai village), Kėdainiai District Municipality, central Lithuania. The park is located in the Šušvė river loop and covers an area of 125 hectares (310 acres). It was created (since 1971) by a local forester Kęstutis Kaltenis who was awarded by the prize of Lithuanian president Valdas Adamkus in 1993 for this contribution to environment protection.

The park hosts thousands of various trees and shrubs which belong to more than 1300 species. All the area is divided into different biogeographical zones: Europe, Siberia, the Caucasus, Central Asia, Far East, Eastern North America and Western North America. The park is created as a landscape composition with a system of small ponds, wooden sculptures and heavy boulders.

Some rare and protected species of Lithuanian flora could be found in the park, as common ivy, dwarf birch, common yew, sessile oak. Also, various species of introduced trees and bushes grow in the park, for example varnish tree, Japanese redwood, ginkgo, Aristolochia manshuriensis, honey locust, Osage orange, Eleutherococcus, spikenard, walnut trees, various magnolias, about 60 species of maple trees (sugar maple, red maple, silver maple, field maple, Tatar maple, striped maple, etc.).

The Skinderiškis Dendrological Park hosted musical festival "Mėnuo Juodaragis" in 2014.

== Gallery ==
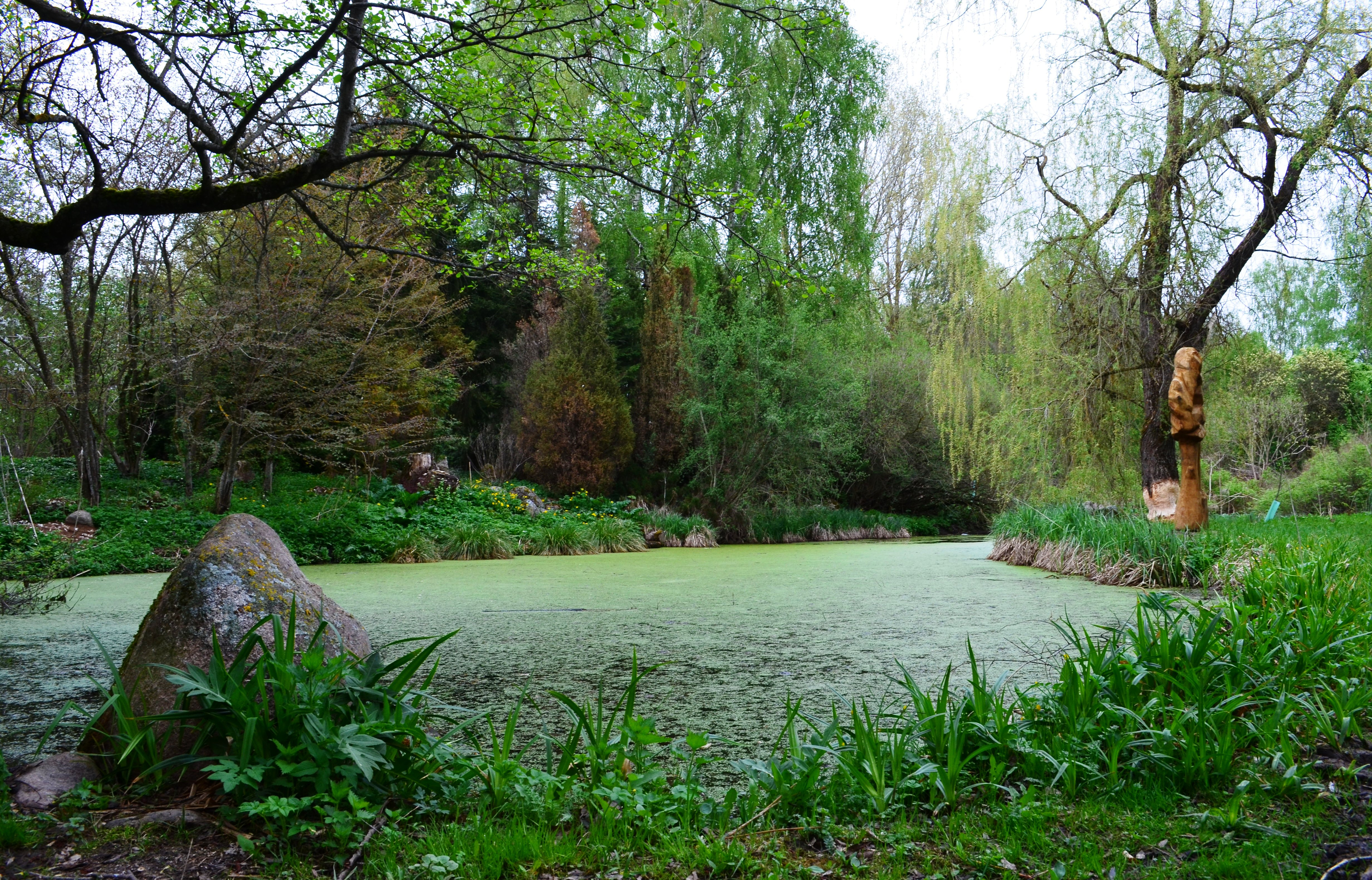
One of the ponds

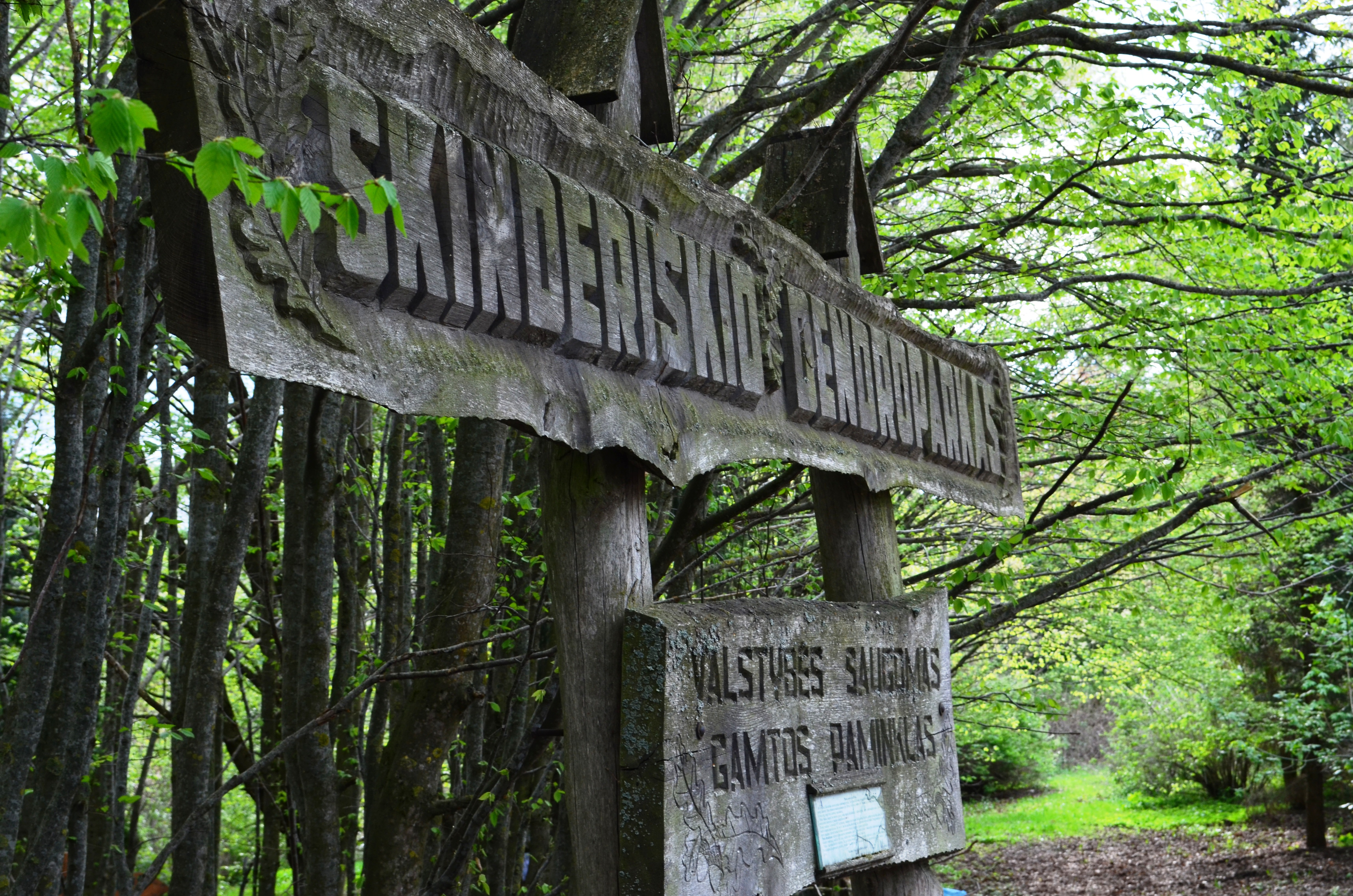
Entrance sign

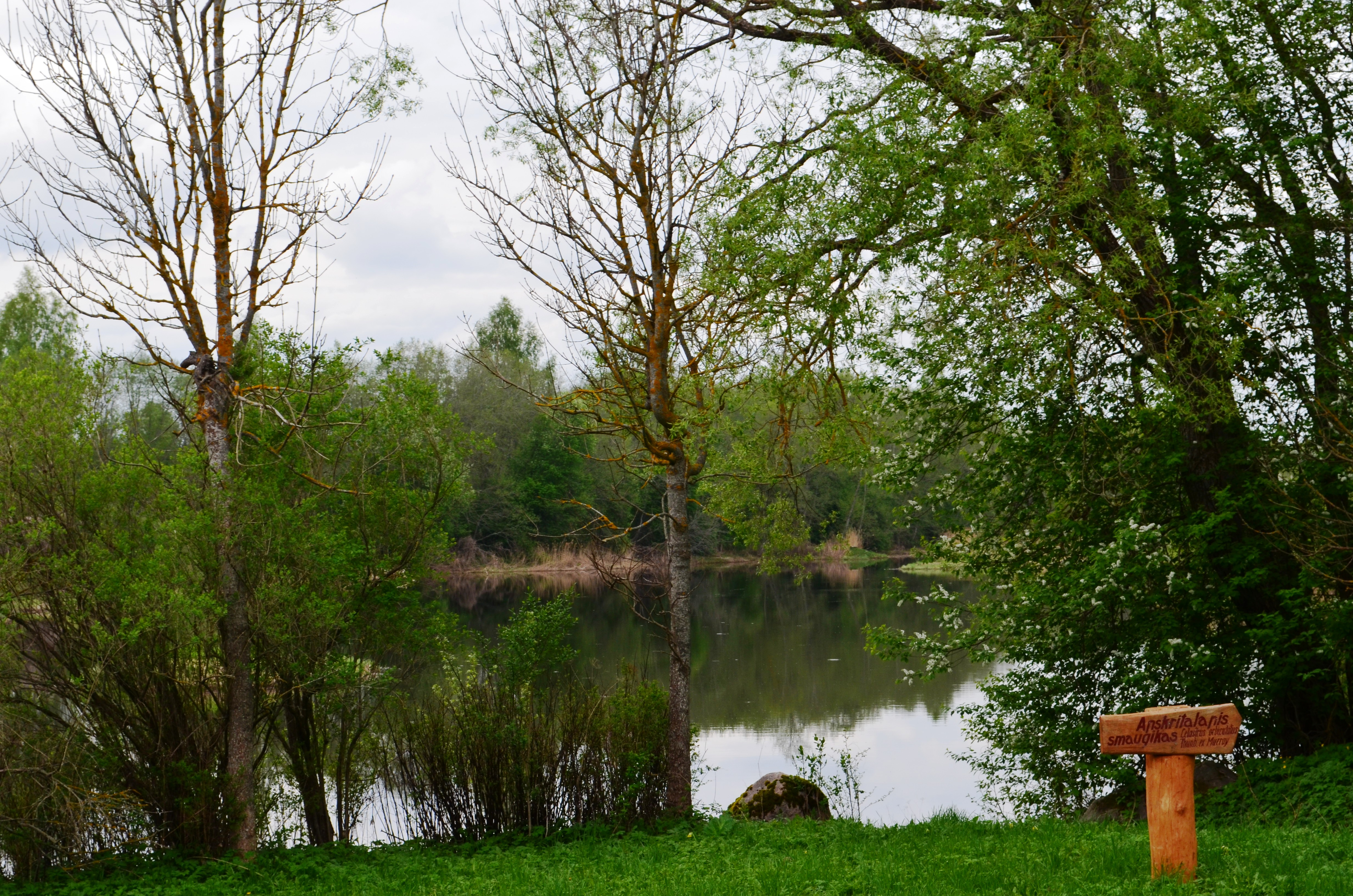
Šušvė river in the park

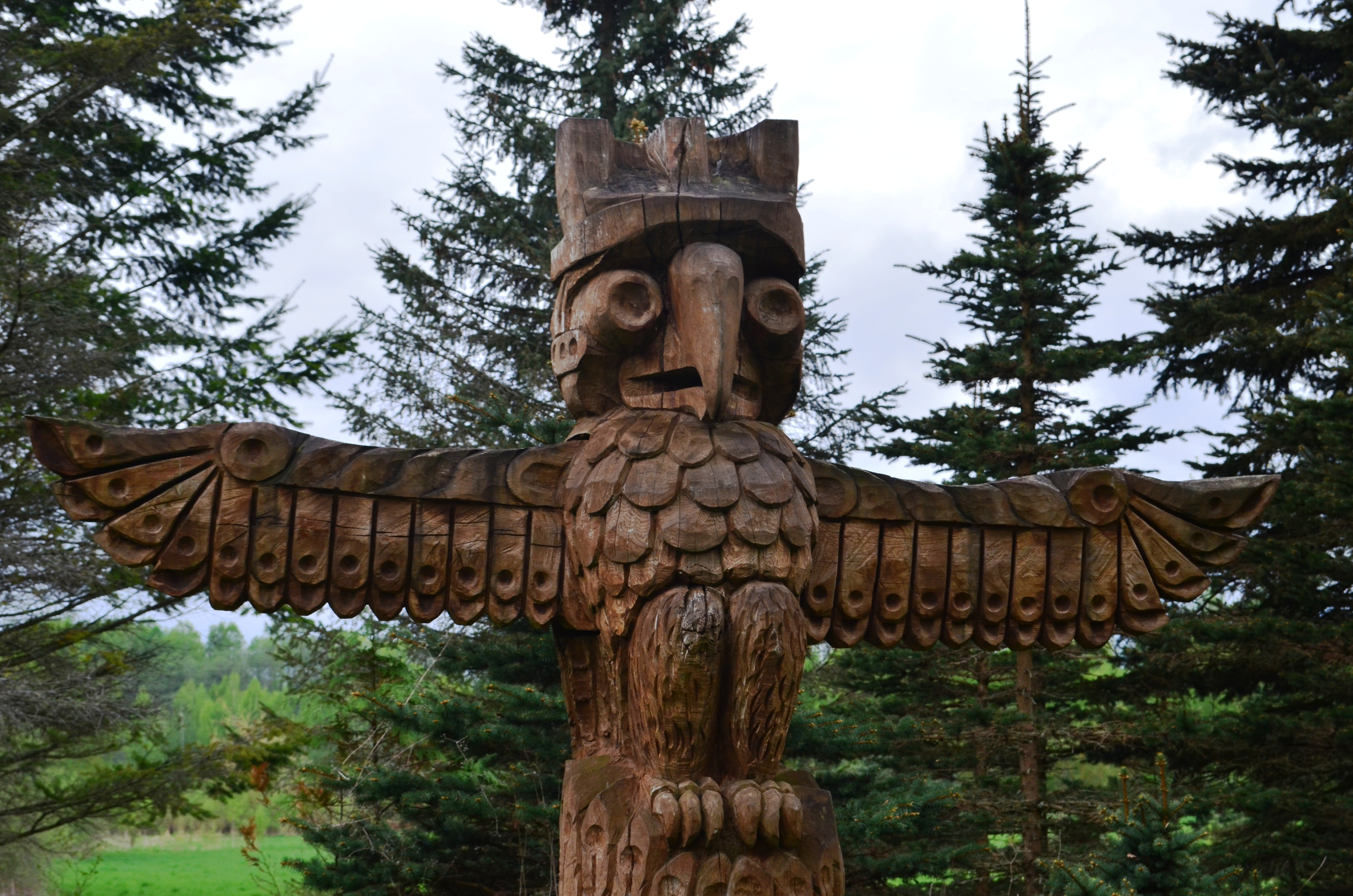
A totem pole in the North American zone

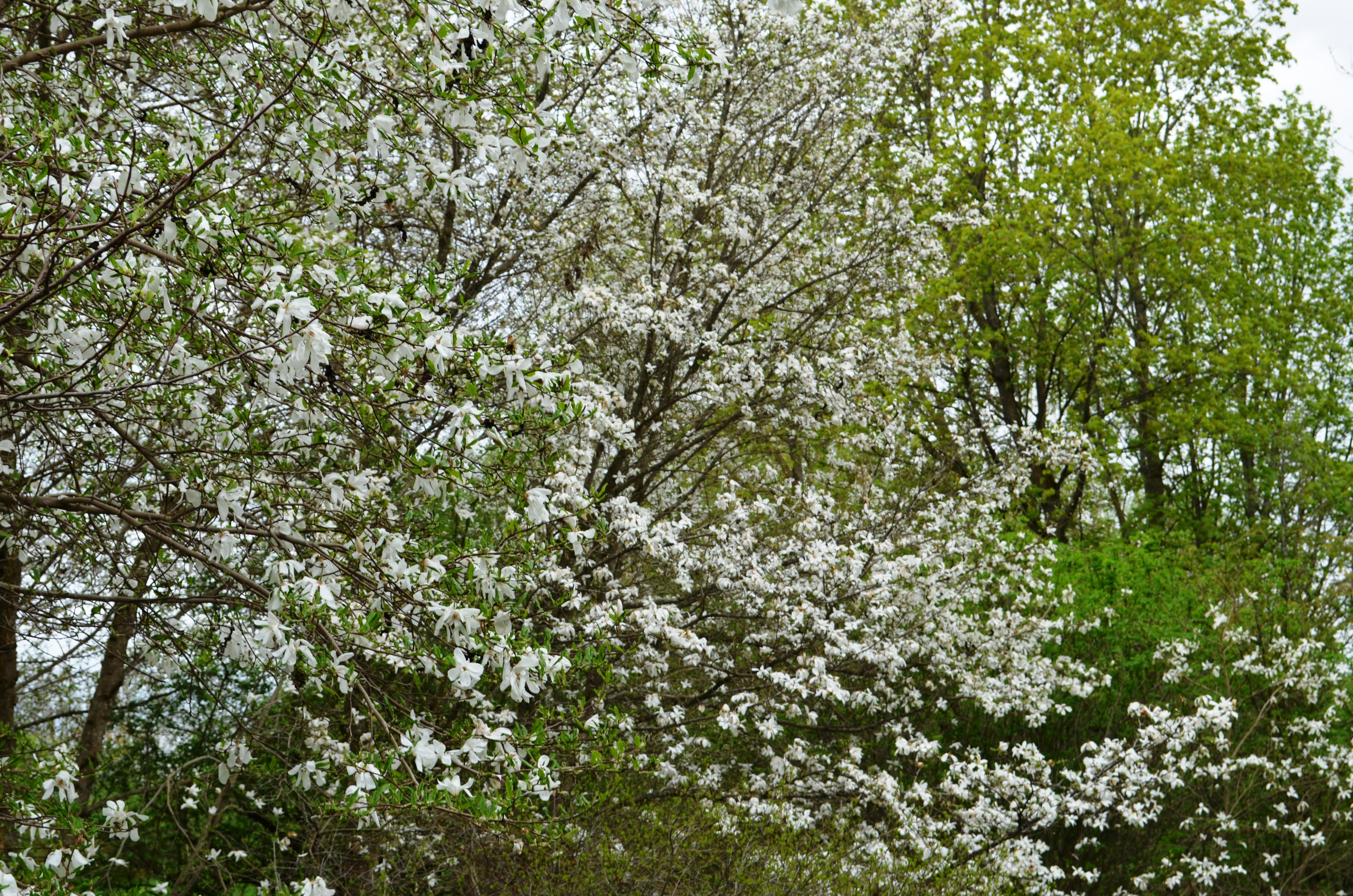
Blooming magnolias
