= Laima Vaitkunskienė =

Lithuanian archaeologist

- Born: September 13, 1936 (age 90); Rokiškis, Lithuania
- Occupation: Archaeologist

Academic background
- Education: Vilnius University
- Thesis: (1967)

Academic work
- Discipline: Medieval archaeology
- Institutions: Lithuanian Institute for Historical Research

Laima Vaitkunskienė (born 13 September 1936) is a Lithuanian medieval archaeologist, who specialises in the study of burial practices. She has led extensive and numerous excavations, and led on the study of amber in the region.

== Biography ==
Born in Rokiškis, Vaitkunskienė graduated in 1956 with a degree in history and philology from Vilnius University. After graduation she worked for the Šiauliai Aušra Museum, before beginning work at the Institute of History in 1957.

From 1958 to 1959, she led excavations at the Juodoniai Hillfort and settlement, in partnership with the Rokiškis Regional Museum. She also led excavations at several burial sites, including: Bandužiai, Jurgaičiai, Kaštaunaliai, Pagrybis, Žąsinas and Žviliai cemeteries. She was awarded a PhD in 1967. Her work at Pagrybis investigated a cemetery dating to the 5th to 6th centuries CE, where she interpreted the site as showing an increased militarisation during the period they were in use. The excavations at Žąsinas were undertaken between 1976 and 1979, and resulted in the exploration of Samogitian burial practice from the 10th to 12th centuries. Her excavations at Žviliai were published in 1999 and described barrow use and burial goods deposited there.

Vaitkunskienė also studied comb-shaped pendants from the region, made from amber, and connected their production to the Lithuanian mythology. Her study of amber also led her to the conclusion that its use was restricted not just by its rarity, but by social and spiritual prohibitions.

== Selected works ==
- Vaitkunskienė, Laima. Sidabras senovės Lietuvoje. Mokslas, 1981.
- Vaitkunskienė, Laima. "Senovės Šilališkių šventiniai drabužiai." Šilalės kraštas/sudarytojas Edvardas Vidmantas. Lietuvos kraštotyros draugija, 1994. 26–38.
- Vaitkunskienė, Laima. "Archeologiniai šaltiniai apie mirusiųjų minėjimo apeigas (XIV–XVI a.)." (2016).

== See also ==
- Lithuanian long currency
