= Deveikiškėliai =

- Village
- Location in Lithuania Deveikiškėliai (Lithuania)
- Coordinates: 55°20′00″N 23°44′00″E
- Country: Lithuania
- County: Kaunas County
- Municipality: Kėdainiai district municipality
- Eldership: Krakės Eldership

Population (2011)
  - Total: 2
- Time zone: UTC+2 (EET)
  - Summer (DST): UTC+3 (EEST)

Deveikiškėliai is a village in Kėdainiai district municipality, in Kaunas County, in central Lithuania. According to the 2011 census, the village had a population of 2 people. It is located 1.5 kilometres (0.93 mi) from Deveikiškiai, on the edge of the Josvainiai Forest.

== Demography ==
Historical population

Year	Pop.	±% p.a.
1923	149	—
1959	103	−1.02%
1970	41	−8.03%
1979	7	−17.83%

Year	Pop.	±% p.a.
1989	4	−5.44%
2001	1	−10.91%
2011	2	+7.18%

Source: 1902, 1923, 1959 & 1970, 1979, 1989, 2001, 2011
