= Pilsupiai =

- Village
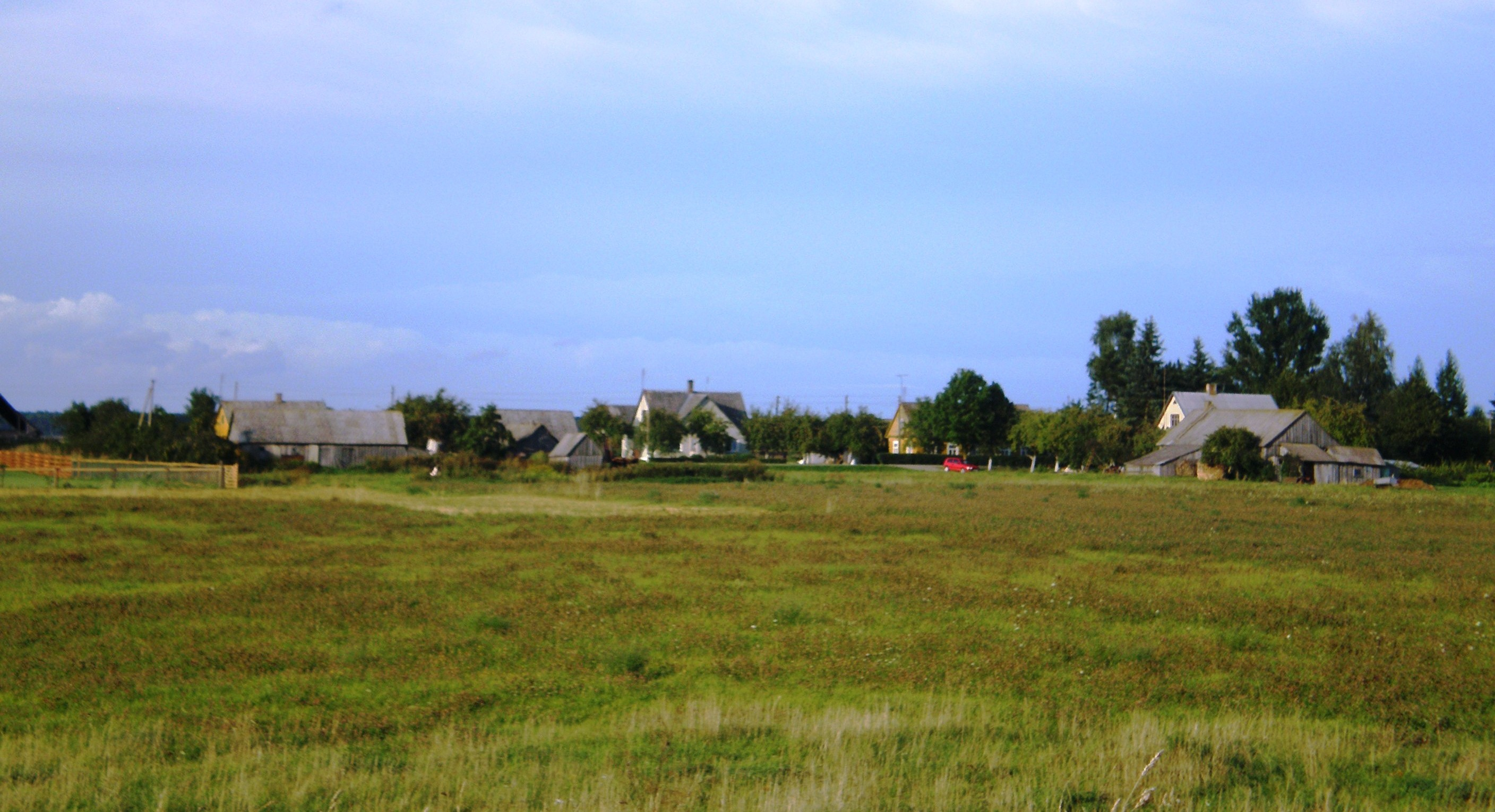

- Location in Lithuania Pilsupiai (Lithuania)
- Coordinates: 55°18′50″N 23°40′59″E
- Country: Lithuania
- County: Kaunas County
- Municipality: Kėdainiai district municipality
- Eldership: Krakės Eldership

Population (2011)
  - Total: 54
- Time zone: UTC+2 (EET)
  - Summer (DST): UTC+3 (EEST)

Pilsupiai (formerly Russian: Пилсупе, Polish: Piłsupie) is a village in Kėdainiai district municipality, in Kaunas County, in central Lithuania. According to the 2011 census, the village had a population of 54 people. It is located 10 kilometres (6.2 mi) from Krakės, along the Krakės-Josvainiai road, on the right bank of the Šušvė river (the Angiriai Reservoir), by its tributary Paupelys (or Pilsupys) mouth.

There is the Pilsupiai hillfort (Bakanas' hill) on the confluence of the rivers. Nearby, a nature monument the Piluspiai outcrop is located on the shore of the Angiriai Reservoir. 1 kilometre (0.62 mi) away from Pilsupiai, at the former Skinderiškis estate place the Skinderiškis Dendrological Park is located.

== History ==
Pilsupiai village is known since 1596. The first primary school was established here at the end of the 19th century.

== Demography ==
Historical population

| Year | Pop. | ±% p.a. |
|---|---|---|
| 1866 | 198 | — |
| 1909 | 305 | +1.01% |
| 1923 | 252 | −1.35% |
| 1959 | 173 | −1.04% |
| 1970 | 125 | −2.91% |

| Year | Pop. | ±% p.a. |
|---|---|---|
| 1979 | 99 | −2.56% |
| 1986 | 87 | −1.83% |
| 1989 | 82 | −1.95% |
| 2001 | 72 | −1.08% |
| 2011 | 54 | −2.84% |

Source: 1902, 1923, 1959 & 1970, 1979, 1989, 2001, 2011

== Images ==
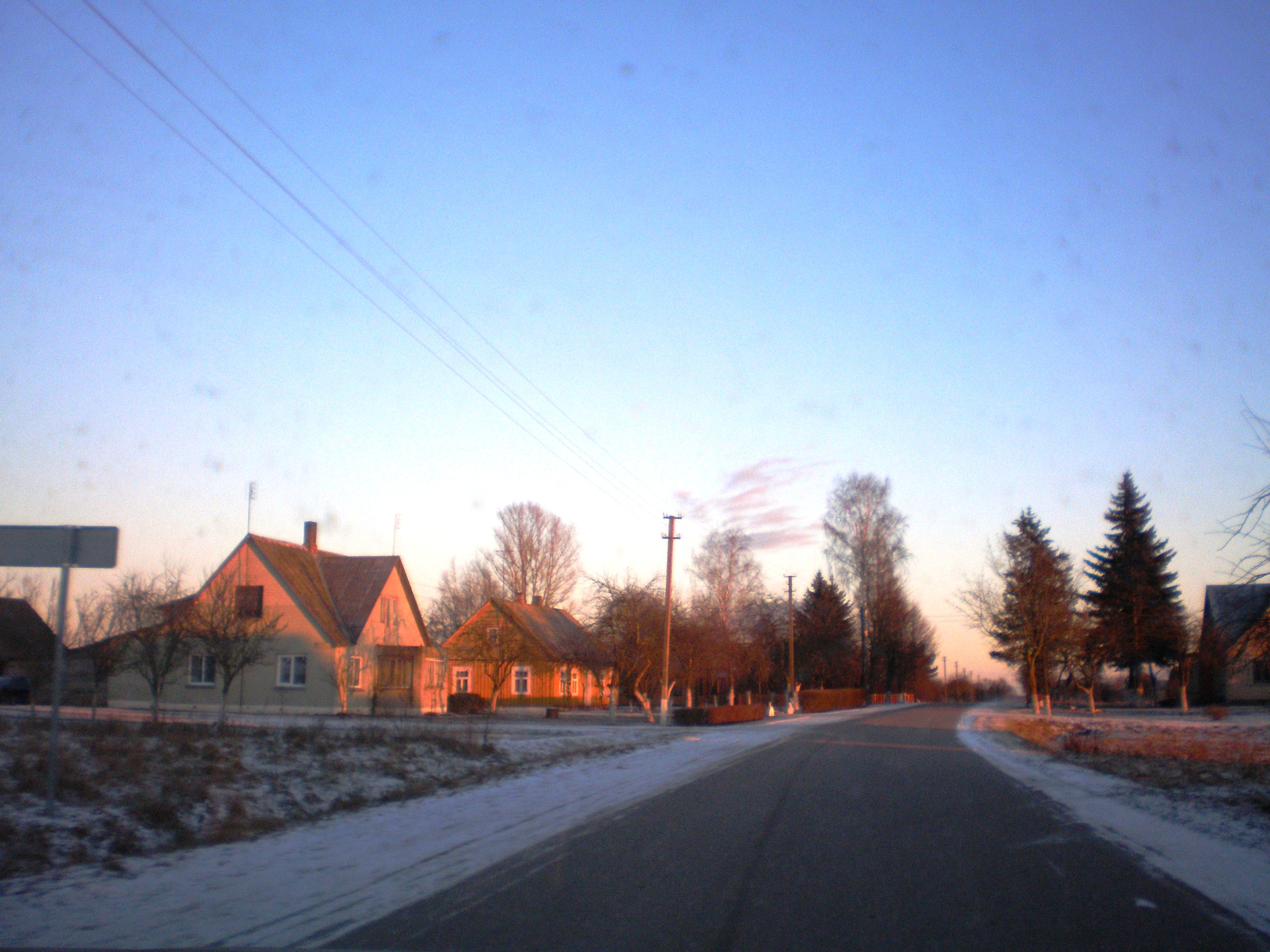
Pilsupiai in winter

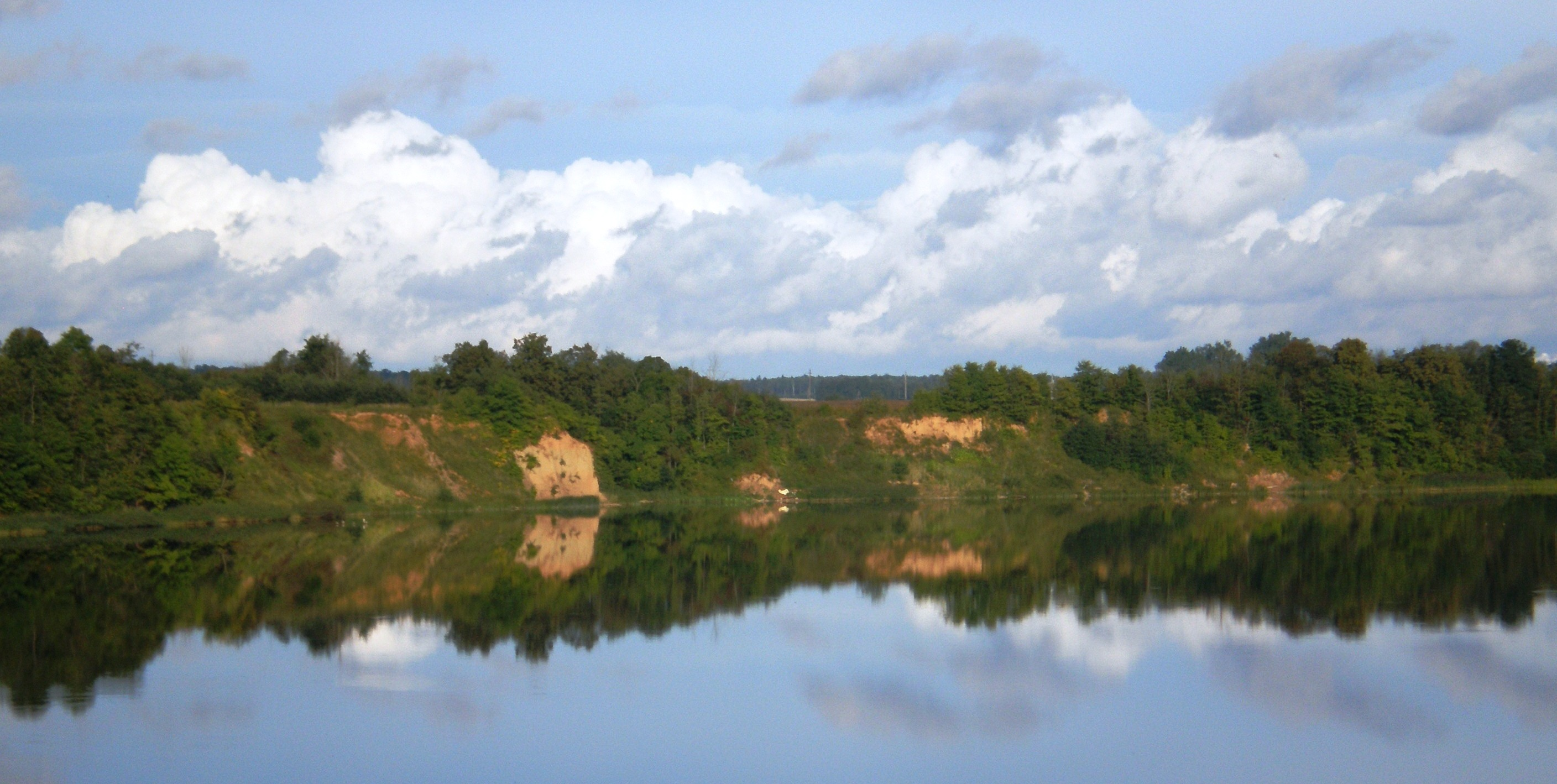
Pilsupiai outcrop

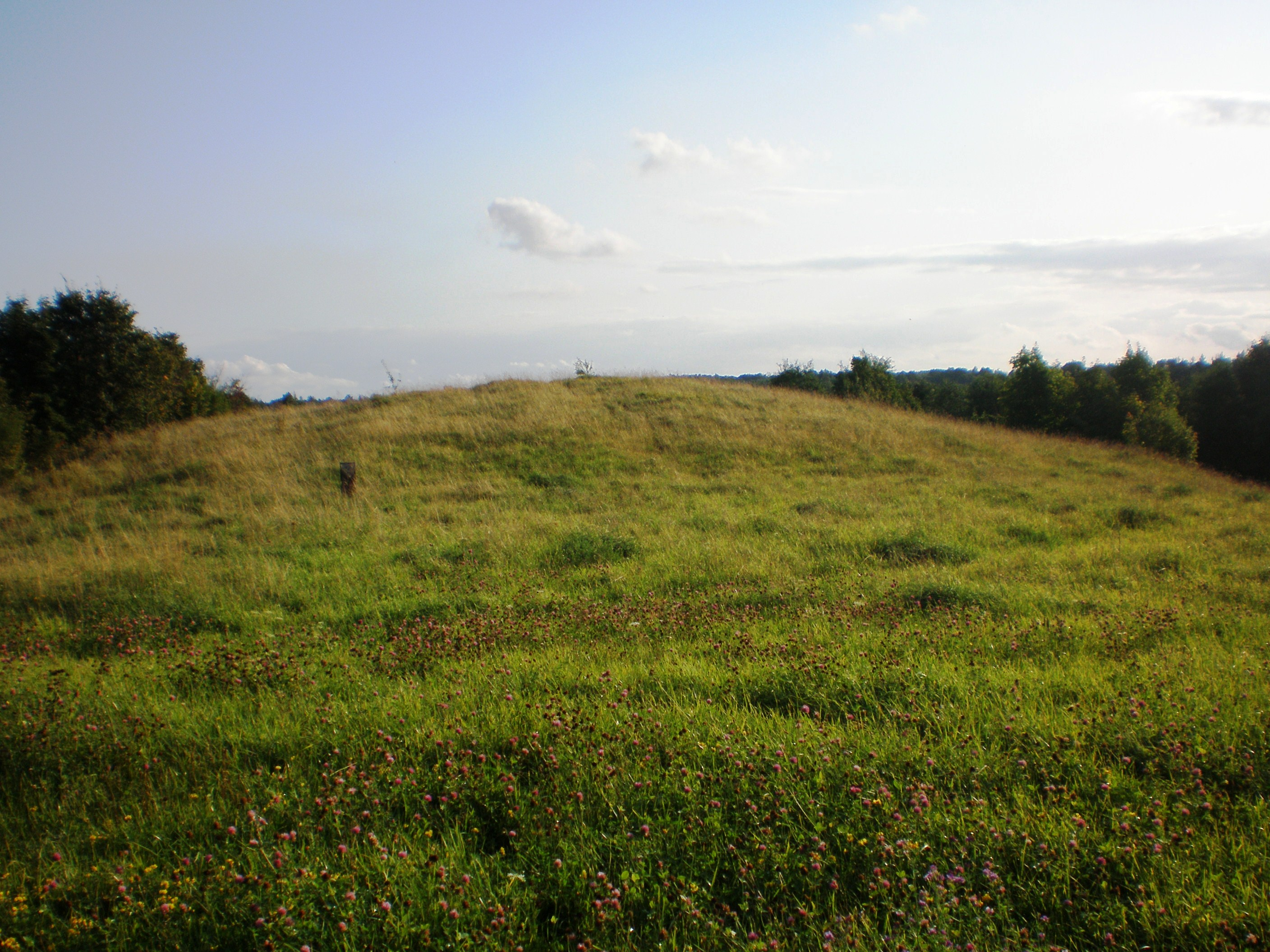
Pilsupiai hillfort

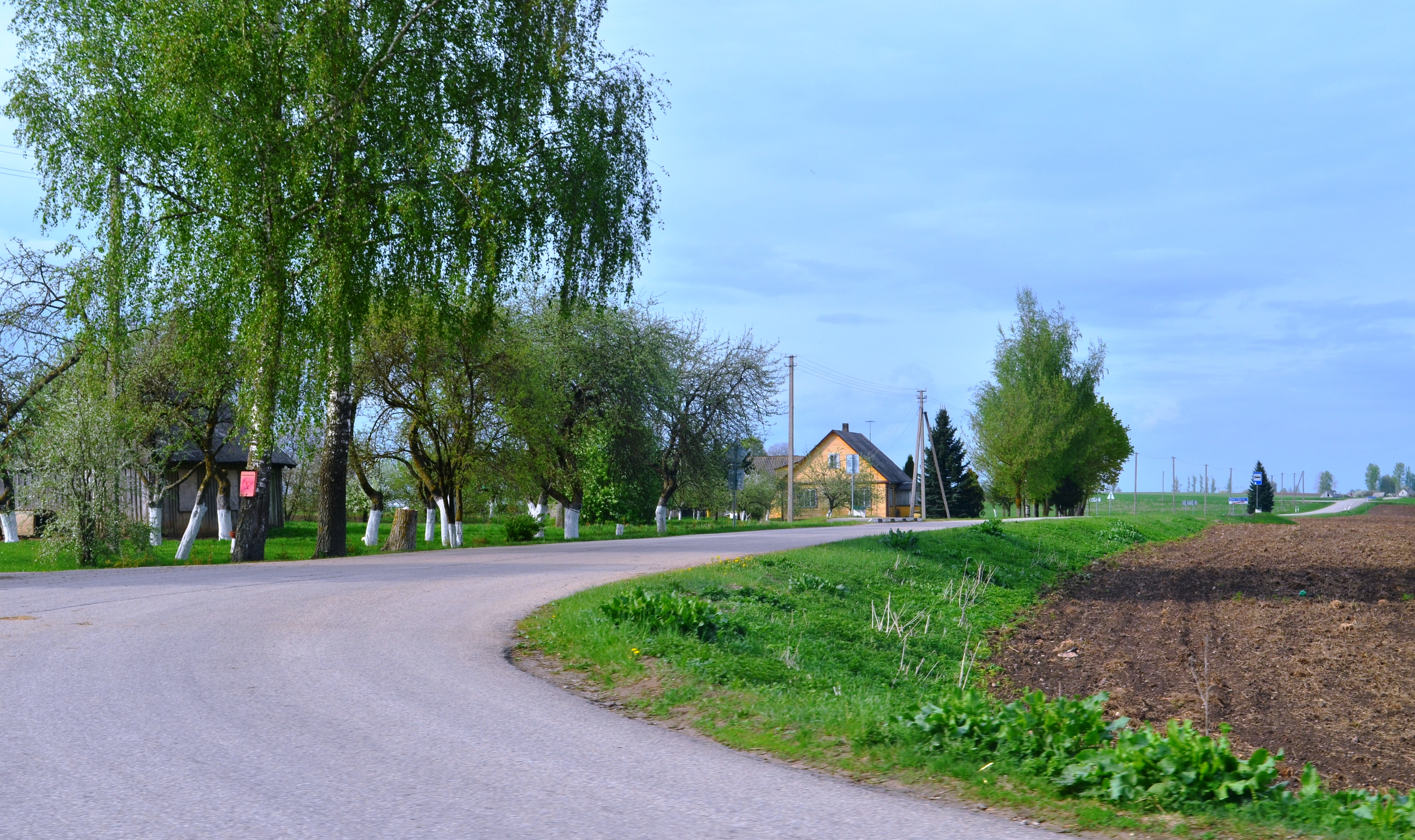
Northern side of Pilsupiai
