= Užvarčiai =

- Village
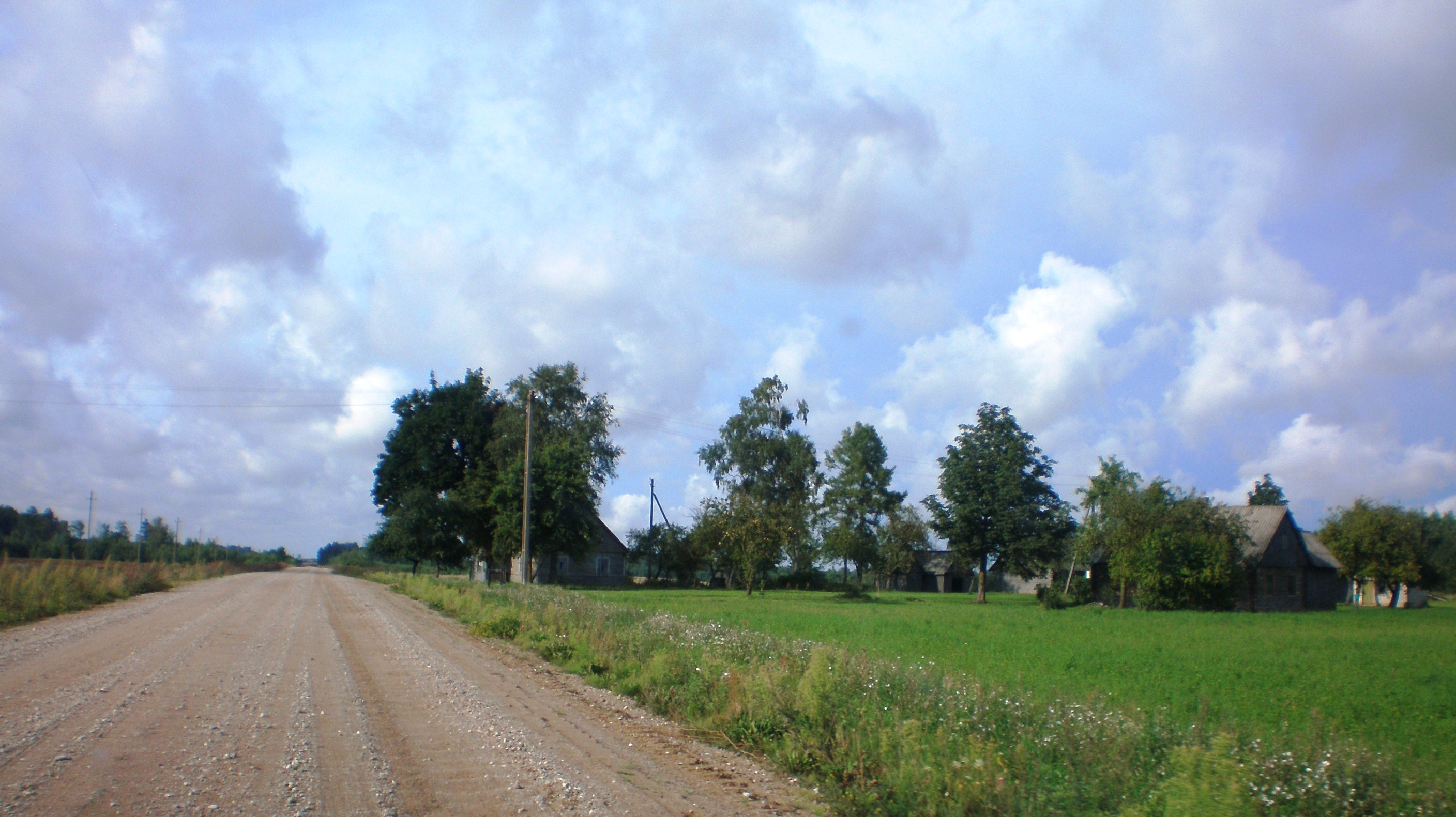

- Location in Lithuania Užvarčiai (Lithuania)
- Coordinates: 55°19′19″N 23°39′29″E
- Country: Lithuania
- County: Kaunas County
- Municipality: Kėdainiai district municipality
- Eldership: Krakės Eldership

Population (2011)
  - Total: 19
- Time zone: UTC+2 (EET)
  - Summer (DST): UTC+3 (EEST)

Užvarčiai ('place beyond the gates', formerly Russian: Ужворце) is a village in Kėdainiai district municipality, in Kaunas County, in central Lithuania. According to the 2011 census, the village had a population of 19 people. It is located 2.5 kilometres (1.6 mi) from Pajieslys, by the Šušvė river. The Pašušvys-Pernarava road goes through the village. The Lapkalnys-Paliepiai Forest is located next to Užvarčiai.

== Demography ==
Historical population

Year	Pop.	±% p.a.
1902	46	—
1923	83	+2.85%
1959	134	+1.34%
1970	90	−3.55%

Year	Pop.	±% p.a.
1979	68	−3.07%
1989	34	−6.70%
2001	21	−3.94%
2011	19	−1.00%

Source: 1902, 1923, 1959 & 1970, 1979, 1989, 2001, 2011
