= Pajieslys Geomorphological Sanctuary =

Protected area in Lithuania

- IUCN category VI (protected area with sustainable use of natural resources)
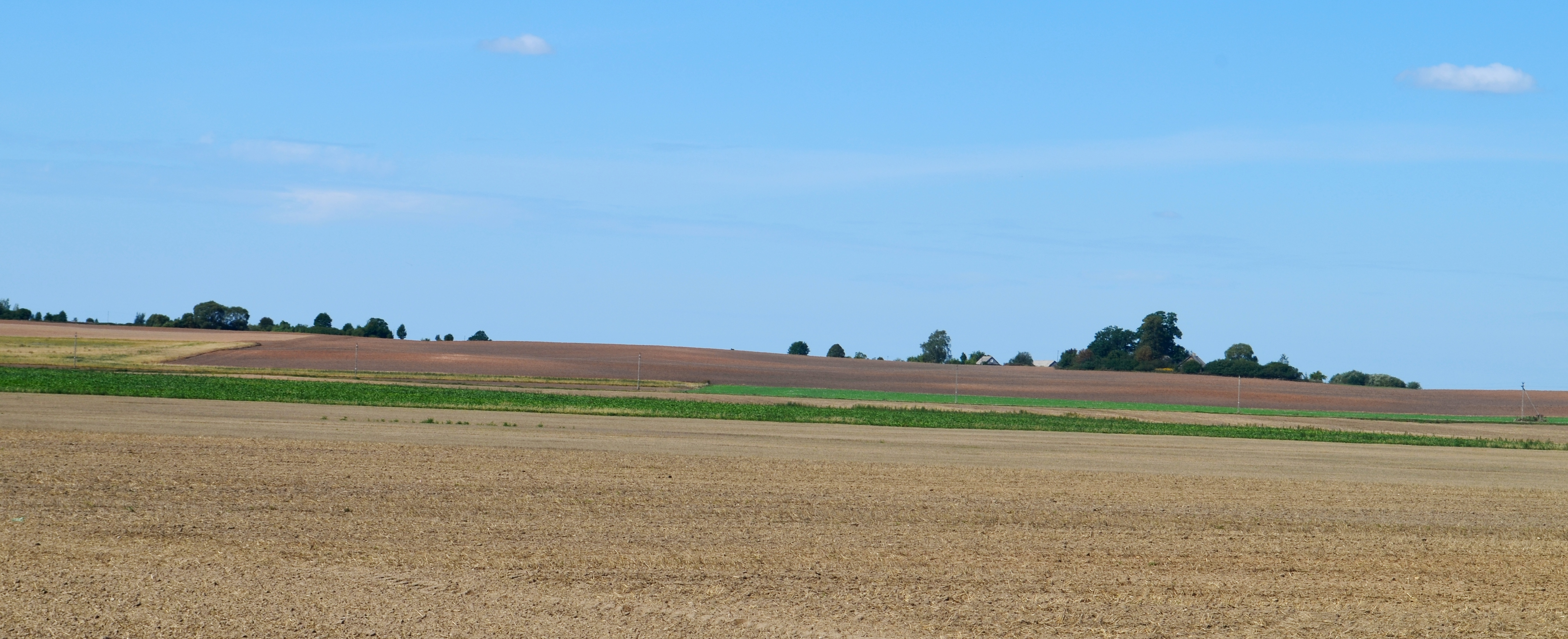
- Pajieslys ridge from the east

- Location within Lithuania Location within Kėdainiai District Municipality
- Location: Krakės Eldership, Kėdainiai District Municipality, Lithuania
- Nearest town: Krakės
- Coordinates: 55°20′0″N 23°40′0″E
- Area: 4.78 km^{2} (1.85 sq mi)
- Established: 1992
- Governing body: Lithuanian Service of Protected Areas

The Pajieslys Geomorphological Sanctuary (Lithuanian: Pajieslio geomorfologinis draustinis) is a protected area of a state importance in Krakės Eldership, Kėdainiai District Municipality, in central Lithuania. It was established in 1992 and covers an area of 478 hectares (1,180 acres). It is located west to Pajieslys village, between Deveikiškiai and Meironiškiai.

The sanctuary was created to protect a peripheral moraine ridge fragment, which is not covered by forests.
