= Pajieslys =

- Village
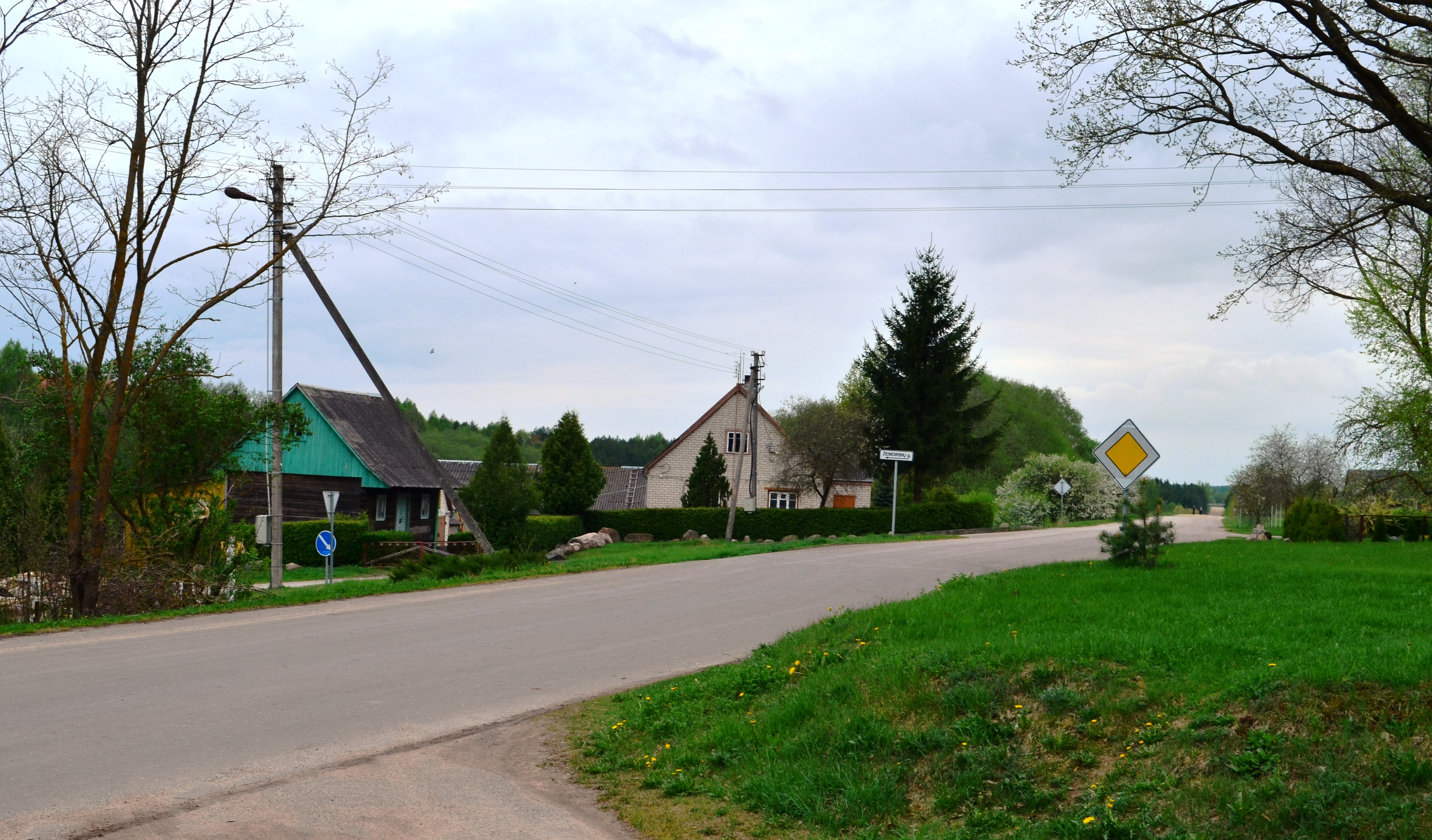

- Location in Lithuania Pajieslys (Lithuania)
- Coordinates: 55°20′38″N 23°40′01″E
- Country: Lithuania
- County: Kaunas County
- Municipality: Kėdainiai district municipality
- Eldership: Krakės Eldership

Population (2011)
  - Total: 254
- Time zone: UTC+2 (EET)
  - Summer (DST): UTC+3 (EEST)

Pajieslys (formerly Russian: Поесли, Polish: Pojeśle) is a village in Kėdainiai district municipality, in Kaunas County, in central Lithuania. According to the 2011 census, the village had a population of 254 people. It is located 8 kilometres (5.0 mi) from Krakės, by the Jiesla rivulet, nearby its confluence with the Šušvė. There is a wooden Catholic church of St. Mary (built in 1913), a library, and a school. The Pajieslys Geomorphological Sanctuary is located nearby. Pajieslys hosts an ISKCON community.

== History ==
The first church in Pajieslys had been built in 1857. Till the Soviet era there was the Pajieslys manor. Later the settlement was transformed into a kolkhoz and selsovet (1950–1988) center.

== Demography ==
Historical population

| Year | Pop. | ±% p.a. |
|---|---|---|
| 1902 | 13 | — |
| 1923 | 45 | +6.09% |
| 1959 | 64 | +0.98% |
| 1970 | 156 | +8.44% |
| 1979 | 204 | +3.03% |

| Year | Pop. | ±% p.a. |
|---|---|---|
| 1986 | 170 | −2.57% |
| 1989 | 201 | +5.74% |
| 2001 | 165 | −1.63% |
| 2011 | 254 | +4.41% |

Source: 1902, 1923, 1959 & 1970, 1979, 1989, 2001, 2011

== Notable people ==
- Teodora Urszula Piłsudska (1811–1886), grandmother of Józef Piłsudski, buried in the Pajieslys Church cemetery.

== Images ==
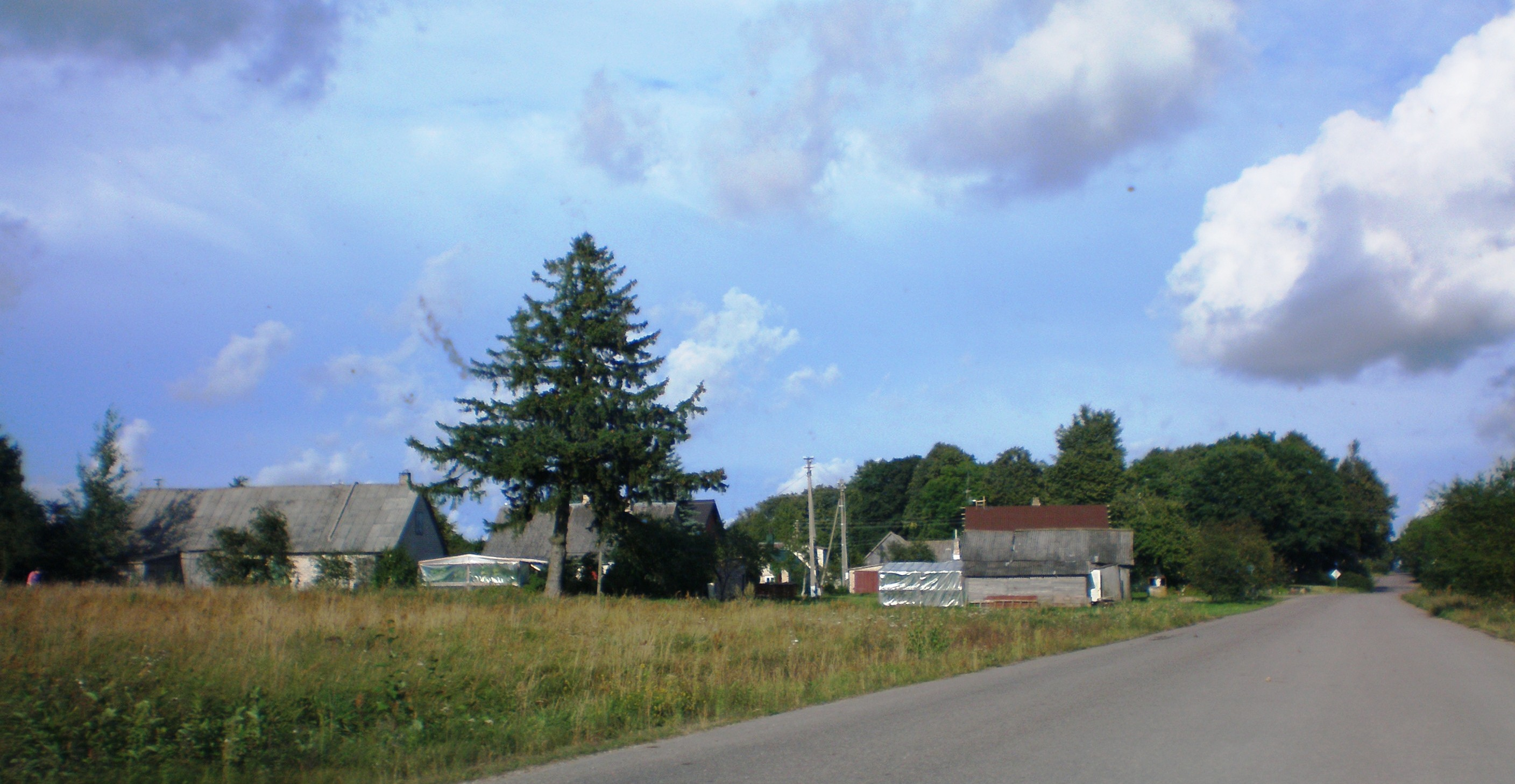
Pajieslys from the west

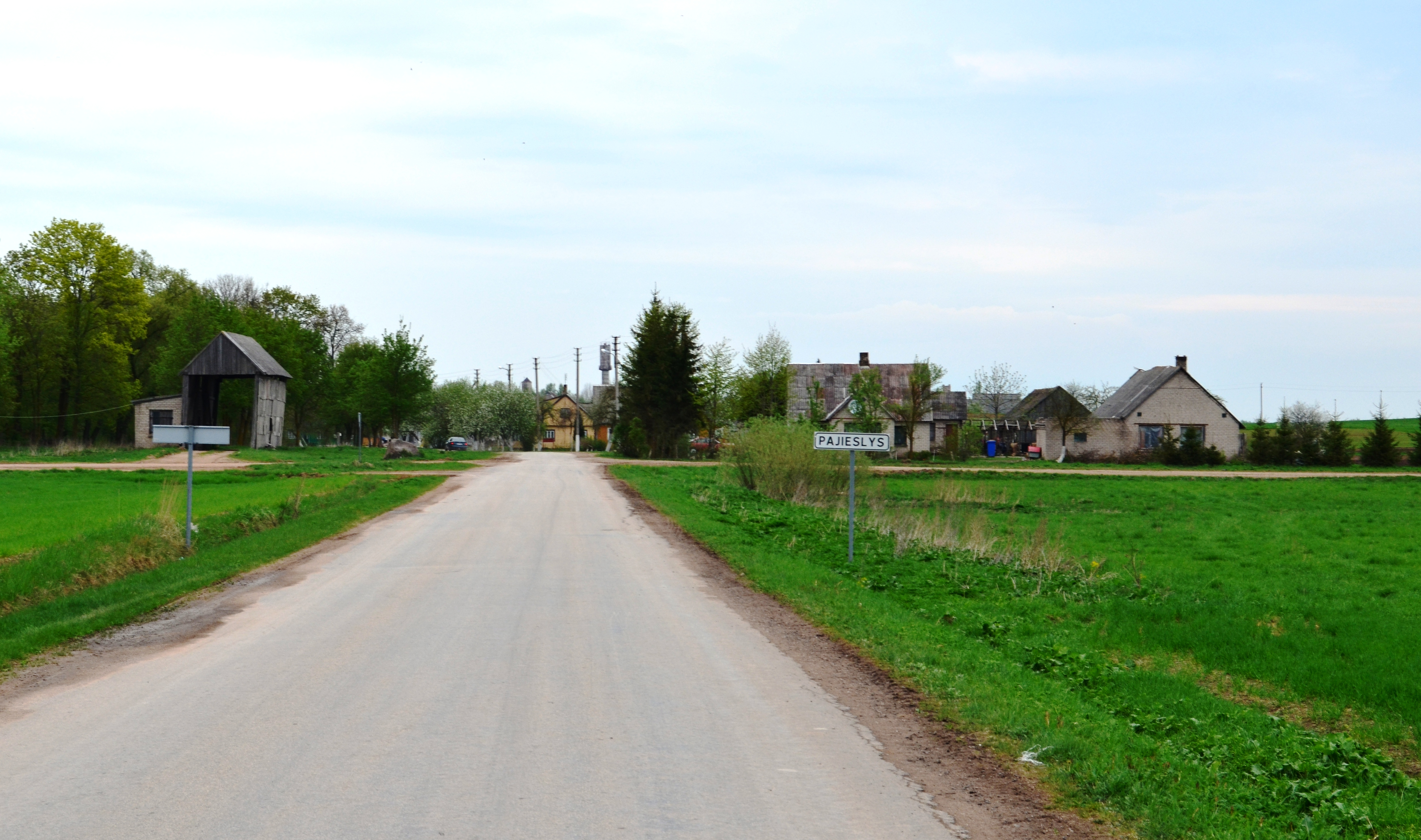
Entrance to Pajieslys from Pilsupiai

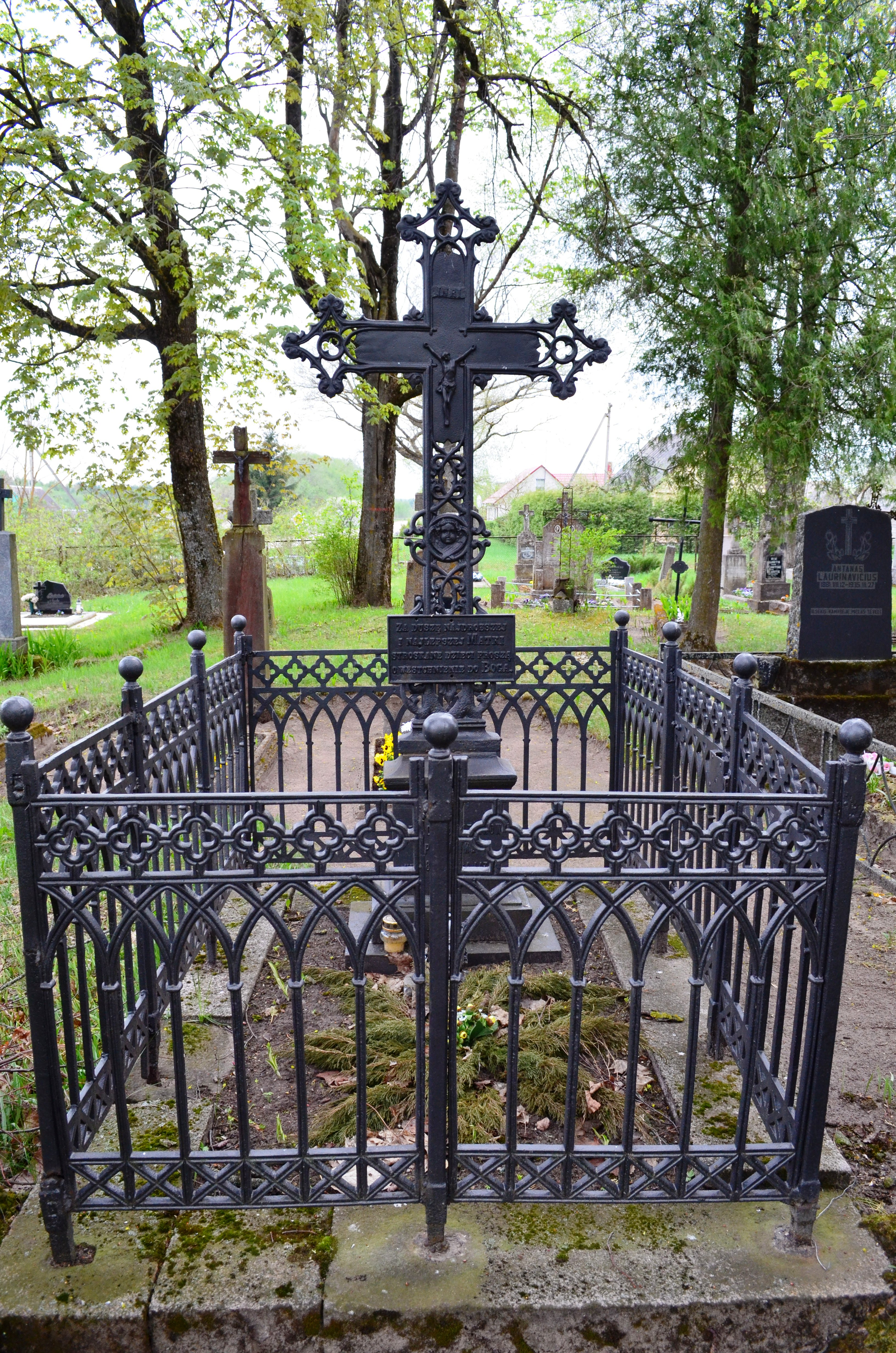
The tomb of Teodora Urszula Piłsudska

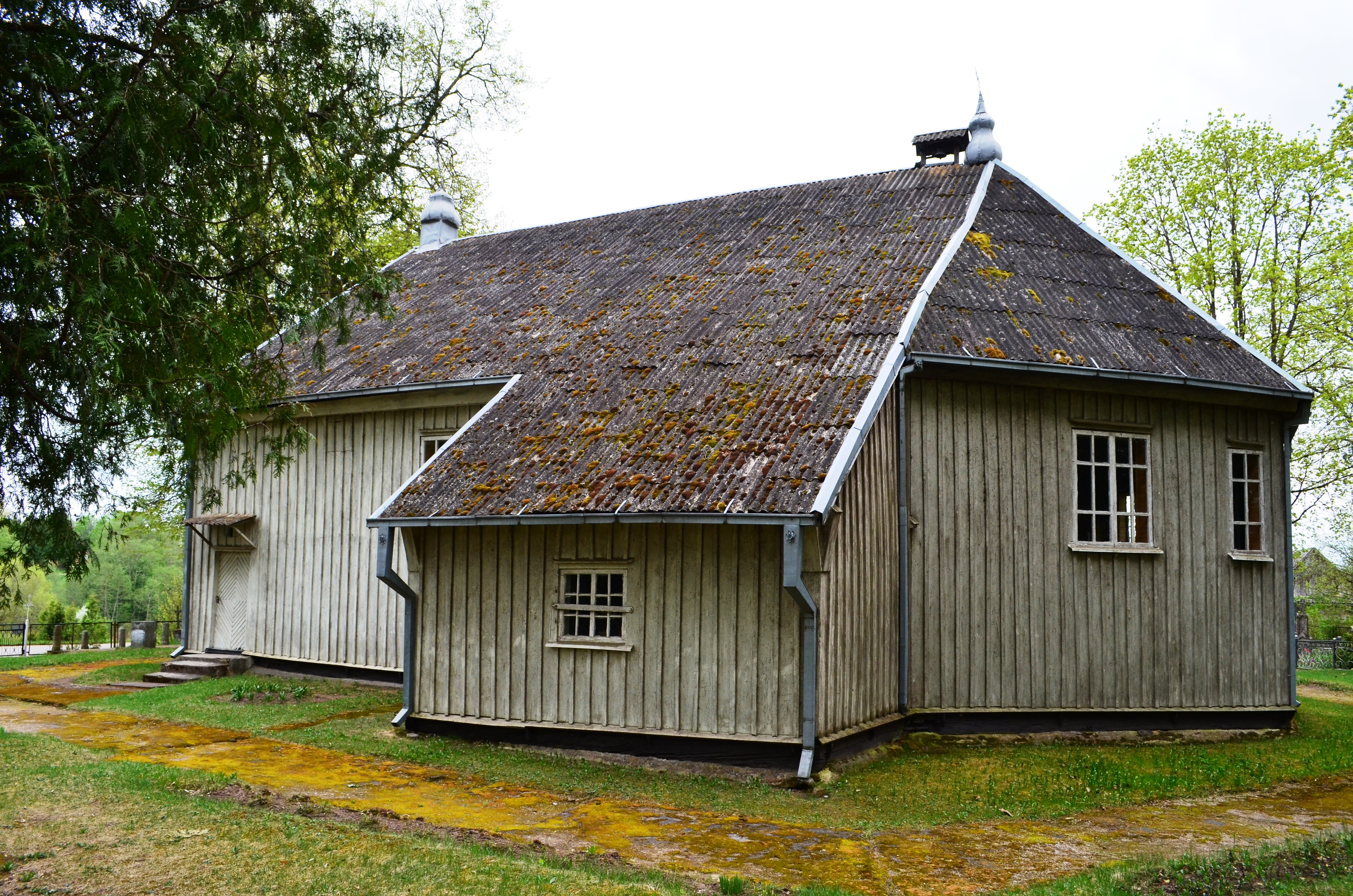
Pajieslys Church
