= Šilainiai (disambiguation) =

Šilainiai (from the Lithuanian words šilainė, šilainis 'sandy place, sandy soil' and šilas 'pinewood') could refer to several Lithuanian localities:

- Šilainiai, a Kaunas city part
- Šilainiai, Krakės, in Krakės Eldership of Kėdainiai District Municipality
- Šilainiai, Pelėdnagiai, in Pelėdnagiai Eldership of Kėdainiai District Municipality
- Šilainiai railway station in Zutkiai village of Kėdainiai District Municipality.

== See also ==
- Šilainėliai
