= Ivaniškiai =

Ivaniškiai (from the Slavic name Ivan) could refer to several Lithuanian villages:

- Ivaniškiai, Josvainiai, in Josvainiai Eldership of Kėdainiai District Municipality
- Ivaniškiai, Pelėdnagiai, in Pelėdnagiai Eldership of Kėdainiai District Municipality

== See also ==
- Ivaniškis
- Iwaniszki
- Iwaniska
