= Baldinka =

- Village
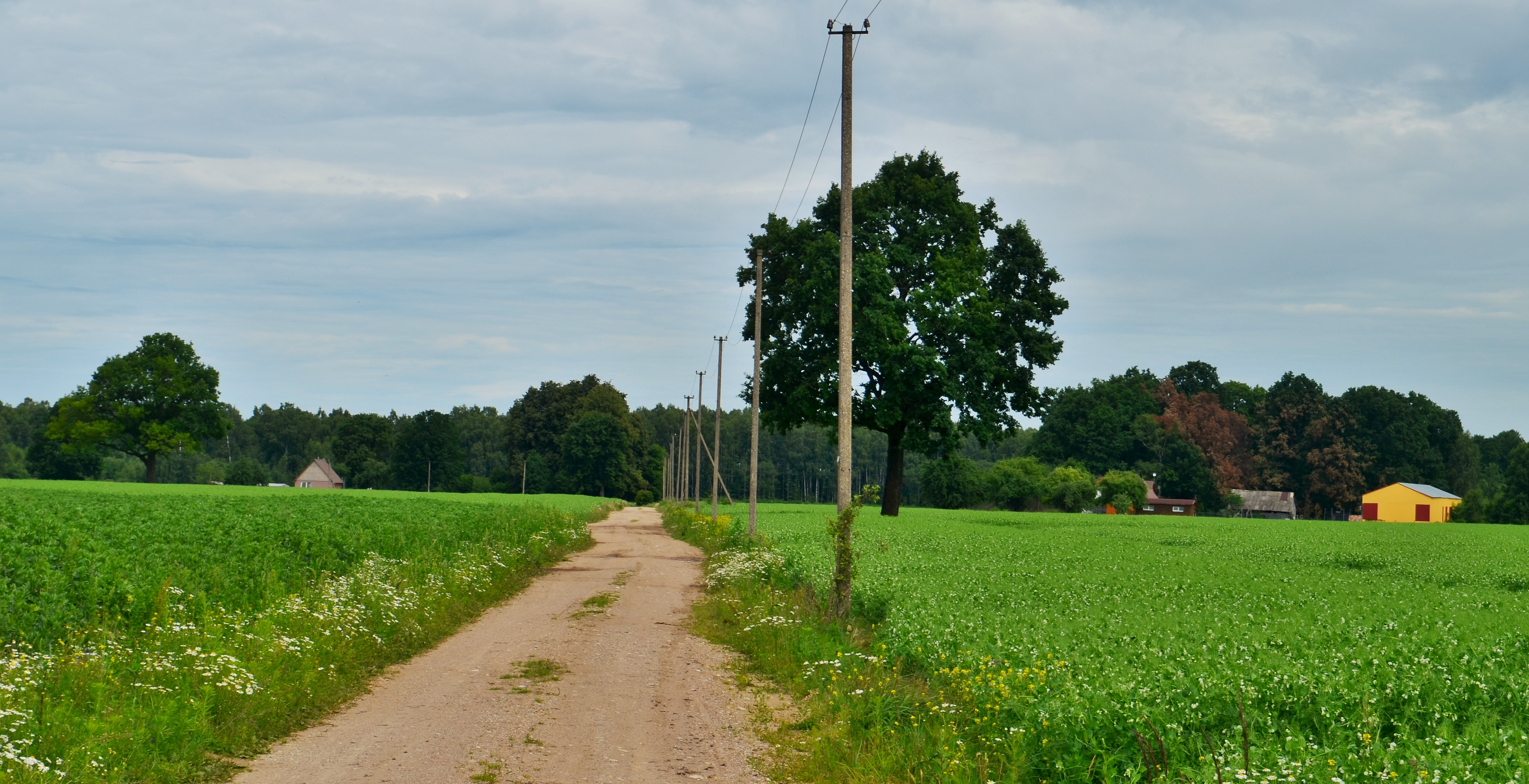

- Location in Lithuania Baldinka (Lithuania)
- Coordinates: 55°15′0″N 24°06′50″E
- Country: Lithuania
- County: Kaunas County
- Municipality: Kėdainiai district municipality
- Eldership: Pelėdnagiai Eldership

Population (2011)
  - Total: 4
- Time zone: UTC+2 (EET)
  - Summer (DST): UTC+3 (EEST)

Baldinka (formerly Russian: Балдынка) is a village in Kėdainiai district municipality, in Kaunas County, in central Lithuania. According to the 2011 census, the village had a population of 4 people. It is located 1 kilometre (0.62 mi) from Beinaičiai, between the Aukupis and the Gegužinė rivulets, near the Šilainiai quarry.

== Demography ==
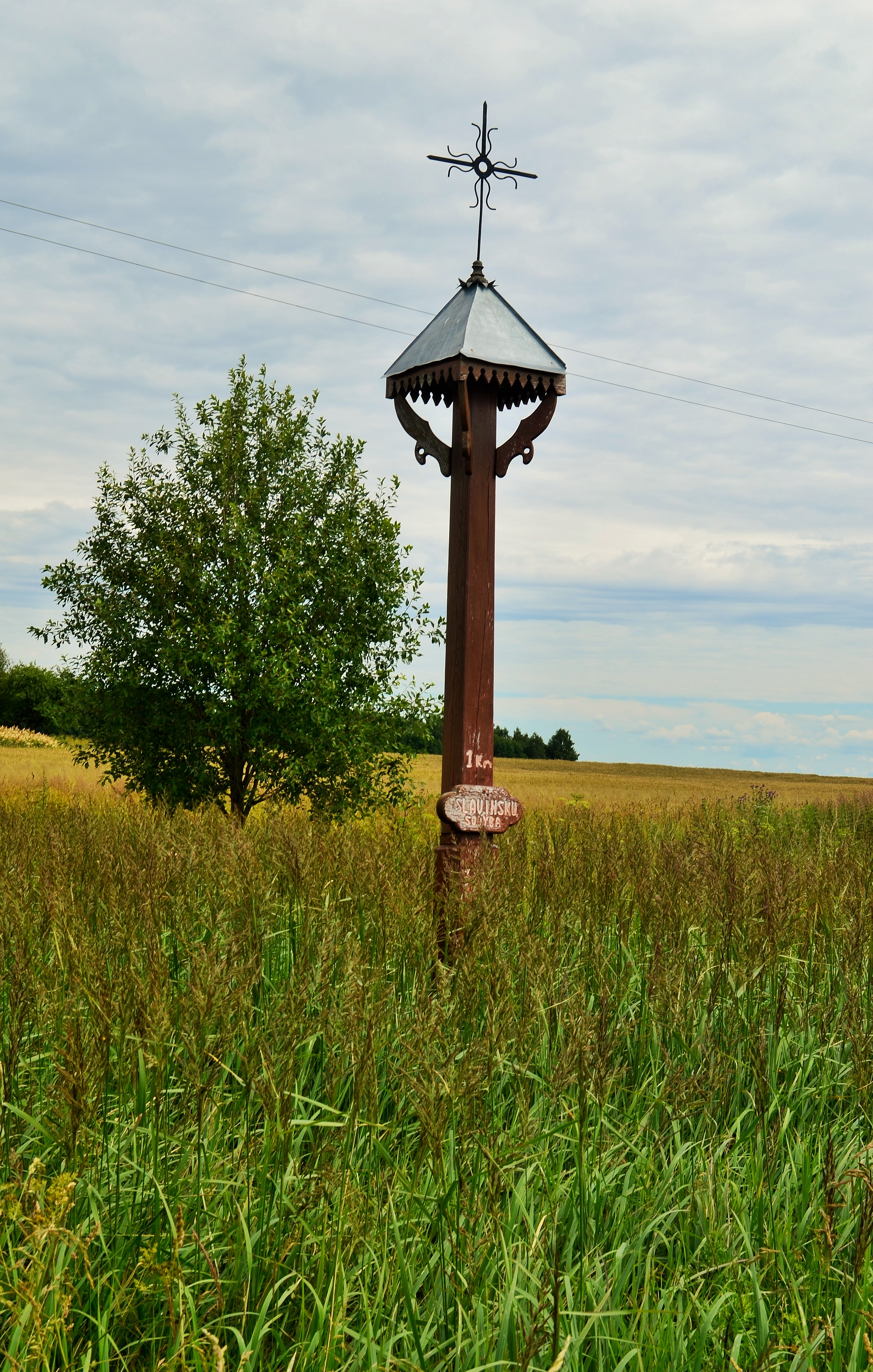
A roofed pole at the entrance to Baldinka

Historical population

Year	Pop.	±% p.a.
1902	32	—
1923	63	+3.28%
1959	58	−0.23%
1970	45	−2.28%

Year	Pop.	±% p.a.
1979	16	−10.85%
1989	16	+0.00%
2001	24	+3.44%
2011	4	−16.40%

Source: 1902, 1923, 1959 & 1970, 1979, 1989, 2001, 2011
