= Nartautai =

- Village
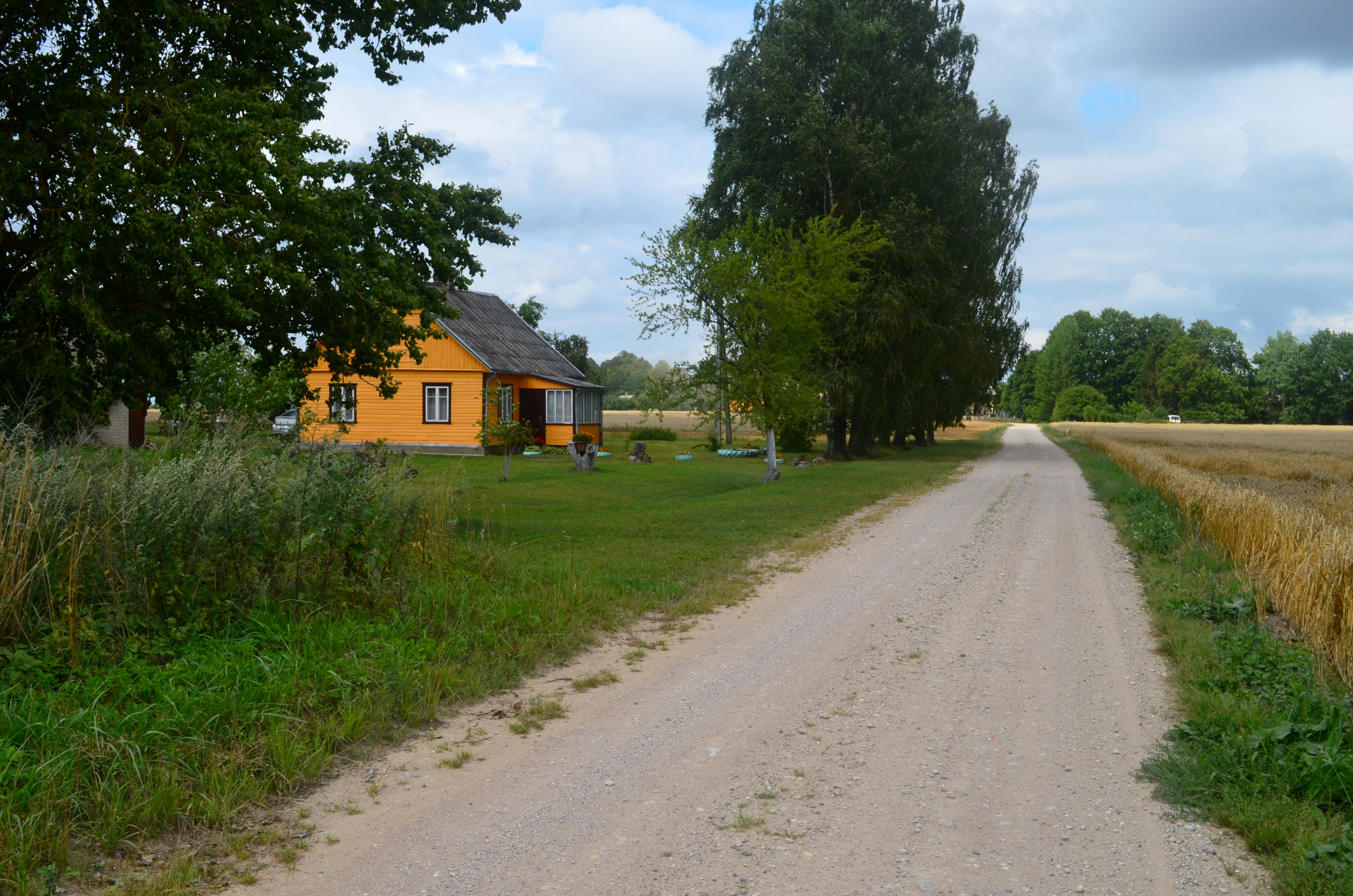

- Location in Lithuania Nartautai (Lithuania)
- Coordinates: 55°12′52″N 24°07′54″E
- Country: Lithuania
- County: Kaunas County
- Municipality: Kėdainiai district municipality
- Eldership: Pelėdnagiai Eldership

Population (2011)
  - Total: 0
- Time zone: UTC+2 (EET)
  - Summer (DST): UTC+3 (EEST)

Nartautai (formerly Russian: Нартовты, Polish: Nartowty) is a village in Kėdainiai district municipality, in Kaunas County, in central Lithuania. According to the 2011 census, the village was uninhabited. It is located 6 kilometres (3.7 mi) from Nociūnai, next to Juciūnai and the Nartautai Forest.

At the beginning of the 20th century, Nartautai was an estate of the Gulbinskai family.

== Demography ==
Historical population

Year	Pop.	±% p.a.
1902	95	—
1923	131	+1.54%
1959	34	−3.68%
1970	13	−8.37%

Year	Pop.	±% p.a.
1979	12	−0.89%
1989	6	−6.70%
2001	1	−13.87%
2011	0	−100.00%

Source: 1902, 1923, 1959 & 1970, 1979, 1989, 2001, 2011
