= Činkiai =

- Village
- Location in Lithuania Činkiai (Lithuania)
- Coordinates: 55°13′48″N 24°00′32″E
- Country: Lithuania
- County: Kaunas County
- Municipality: Kėdainiai district municipality
- Eldership: Pelėdnagiai Eldership
- Time zone: UTC+2 (EET)
  - Summer (DST): UTC+3 (EEST)

Činkiai (formerly Russian: Чинкяй, Polish: Czynkie) was a village, located in Kėdainiai district municipality, in Kaunas County, in central Lithuania. It was 2 kilometres (1.2 mi) from Nociūnai, between Medekšiai and Kudžioniai villages, by the Šerkšnys river.

== History ==
At the end of the 19th century it belonged to the Medekšiai estate. Till 1863 it was a property of the Geištarai family.

On 27 October 1971 Činkiai village of Pelėdnagiai selsovet was liquidated.

== Demography ==
Historical population
Year	Pop.	±% p.a.
1902	250	—
1923	113	−3.71%
Source: 1902, 1923
