= Liaudiškiai, Kėdainiai =

Liaudiškiai
- Village
- Location in Lithuania Liaudiškiai (Lithuania)
- Coordinates: 55°14′43″N 24°09′27″E
- Country: Lithuania
- County: Kaunas County
- Municipality: Kėdainiai district municipality
- Eldership: Pelėdnagiai Eldership

Population (2011)
  - Total: 0
- Time zone: UTC+2 (EET)
  - Summer (DST): UTC+3 (EEST)

Liaudiškiai (formerly Russian: Лявдышки, romanized: Lyavdyshki) is a village in Kėdainiai district municipality, in Kaunas County, in central Lithuania. According to the 2011 census, the village was uninhabited. It is located 3 kilometres (1.9 mi) from Beinaičiai, by the Lankesa river, in front of Užkapiai, inside the Lankesa Botanical Sanctuary.

== Demography ==
Historical population

Year	Pop.	±% p.a.
1902	11	—
1923	15	+1.49%
1959	16	+0.18%
1970	10	−4.18%

Year	Pop.	±% p.a.
1979	7	−3.89%
1989	3	−8.12%
2001	0	−100.00%
2011	0	0.00%

Source: 1902, 1923, 1959 & 1970, 1979, 1989, 2001, 2011
