= Akmeniai =

Akmeniai may refer to several locations in Lithuania:

- Akmeniai, Jonava
- Akmeniai, Kėdainiai
- Akmeniai, Kelmė
- Akmeniai, Kupiškis
- Akmeniai, Subačius
- Akmeniai, Lazdijai
- Akmeniai, Molėtai
- Akmeniai, Panevėžys
- Akmeniai, Rokiškis
- Akmeniai, Širvintos
- Akmeniai, Trakai
