= Bučiūnai, Kėdainiai =

Bučiūnai
- Village
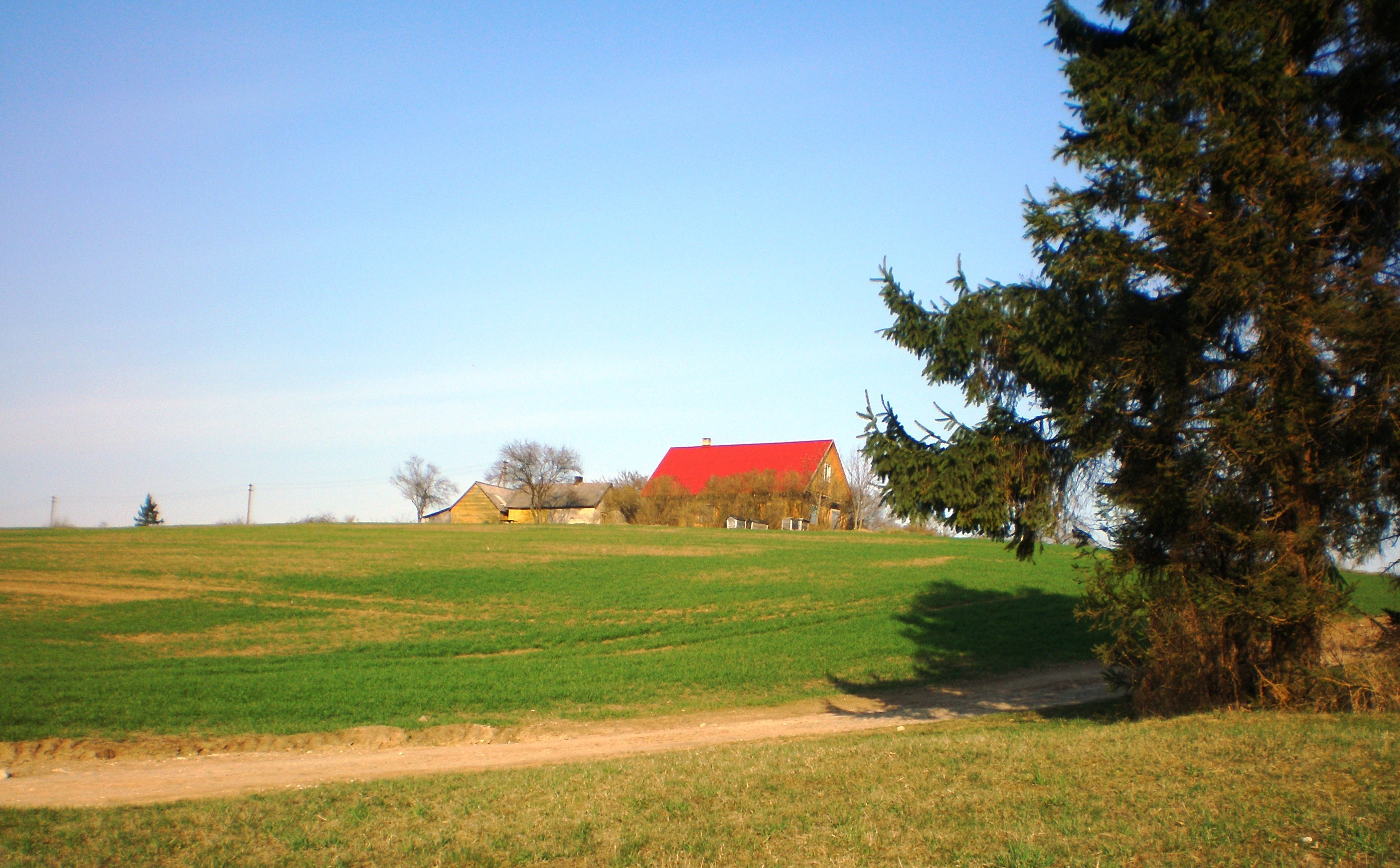

- Location in Lithuania Bučiūnai (Lithuania)
- Coordinates: 55°12′50″N 23°55′20″E
- Country: Lithuania
- County: Kaunas County
- Municipality: Kėdainiai district municipality
- Eldership: Pelėdnagiai Eldership

Population (2011)
  - Total: 18
- Time zone: UTC+2 (EET)
  - Summer (DST): UTC+3 (EEST)

Bučiūnai (formerly Russian: Бучуны, Polish: Buczuny) is a village in Kėdainiai district municipality, in Kaunas County, in central Lithuania. According to the 2011 census, the village had a population of 18 people. It is located 2.5 kilometres (1.6 mi) from Labūnava, by the Kėdainiai-Babtai road, nearby the Nevėžis river, by its tributary the Šakupulis.

== Demography ==
Historical population

Year	Pop.	±% p.a.
1902	113	—
1923	179	+2.21%
1959	206	+0.39%
1970	127	−4.30%
1979	35	−13.34%

Year	Pop.	±% p.a.
1985	21	−8.16%
1989	12	−13.06%
2001	28	+7.32%
2011	18	−4.32%

Source: 1902, 1923, 1959 & 1970, 1979, 1989, 2001, 2011

== Images ==
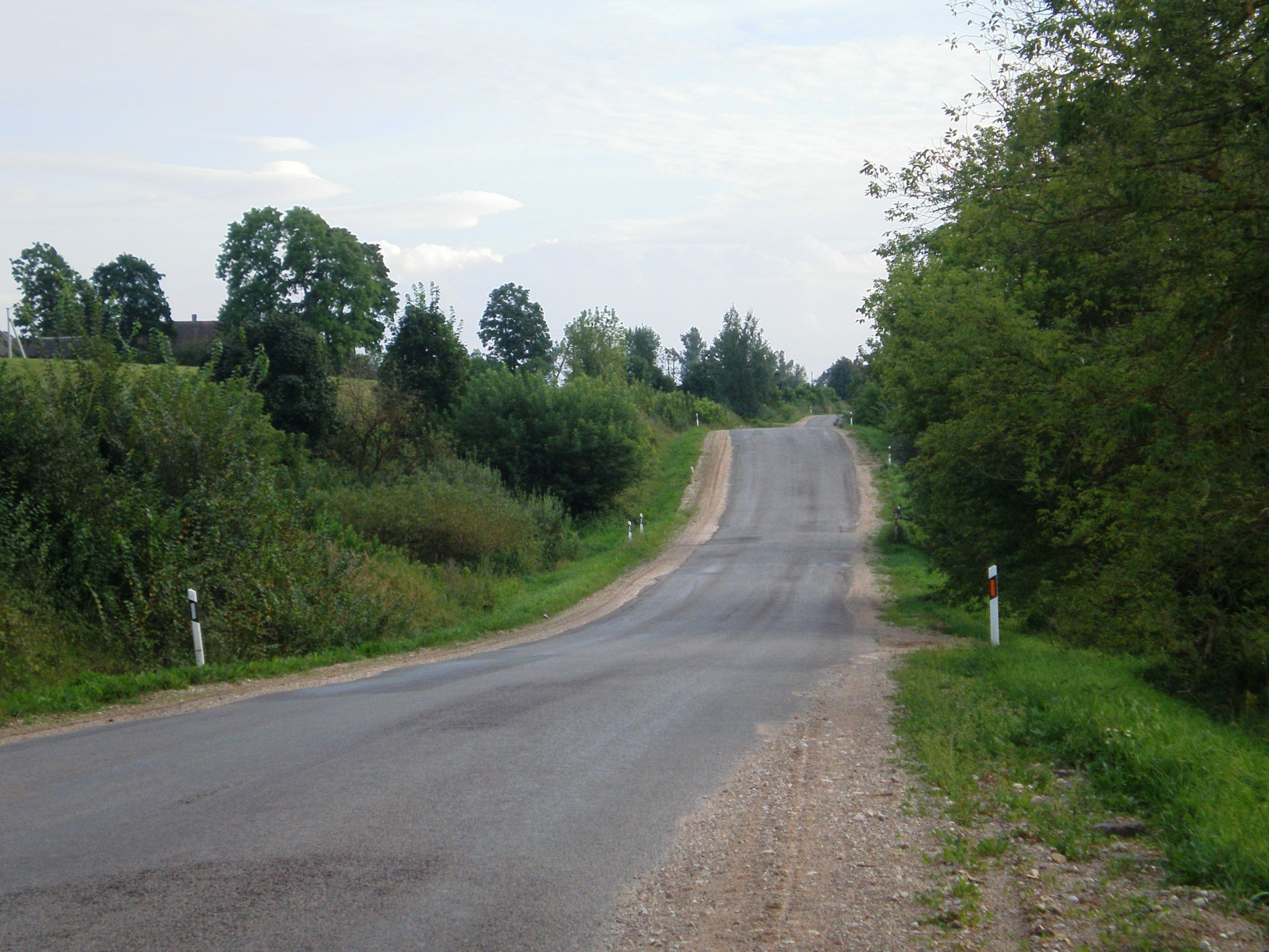
Kėdainiai-Babtai road next to Bučiūnai

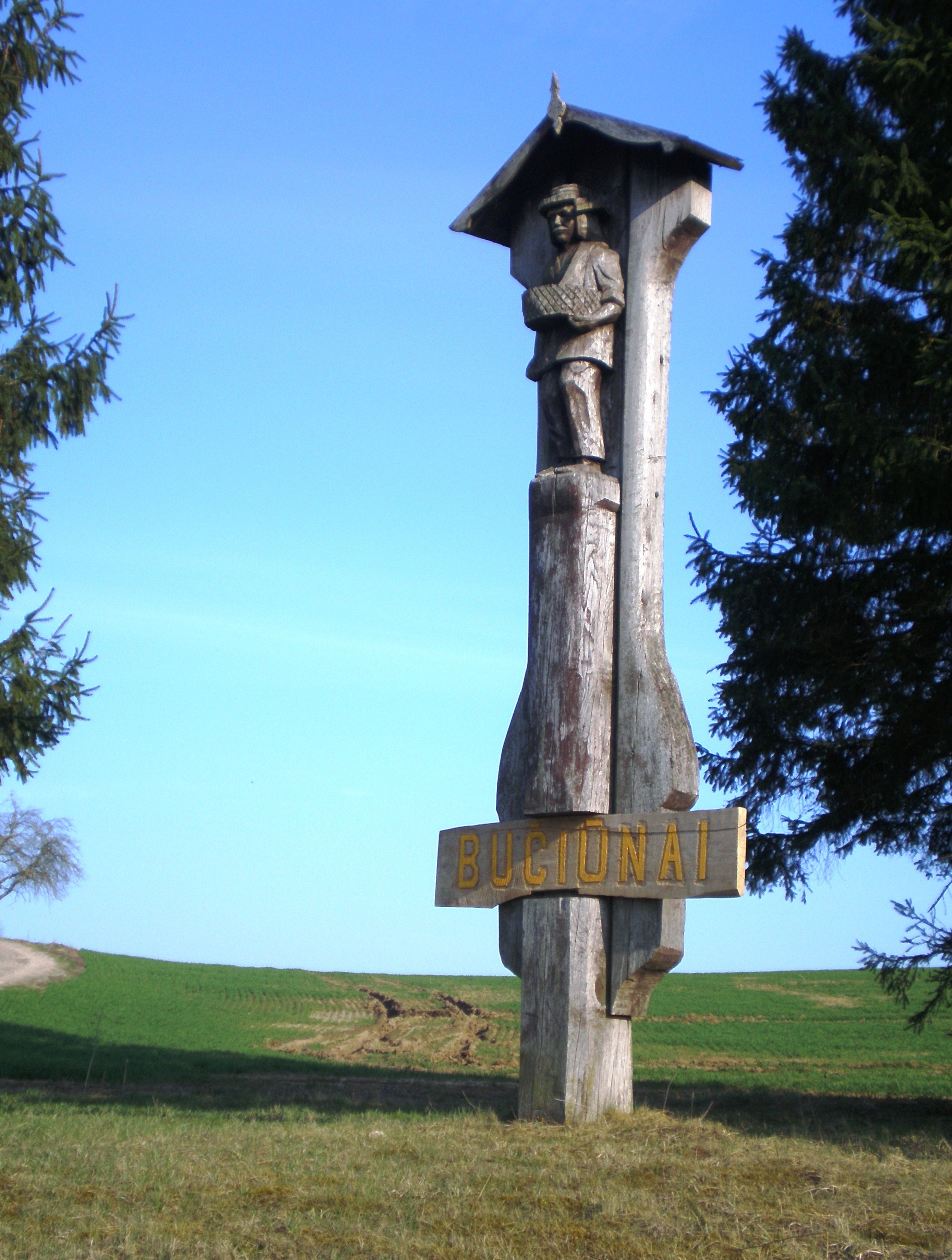
Wooden sign with a name Bučiūnai

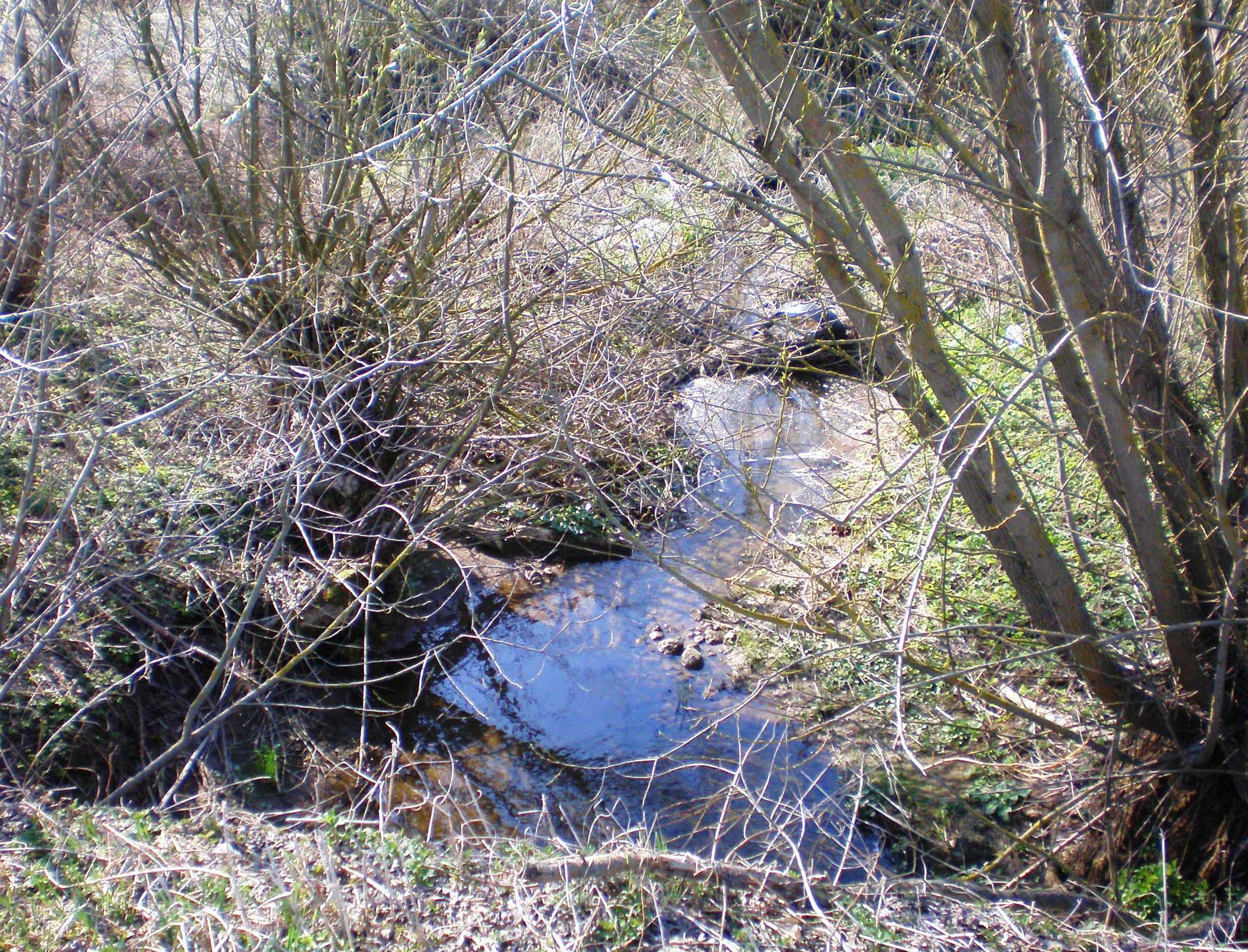
Šakupulis rivulet
