= Eiguliai, Kėdainiai =

Eiguliai
- Village
- Location in Lithuania Eiguliai (Lithuania)
- Coordinates: 55°16′08″N 23°59′10″E
- Country: Lithuania
- County: Kaunas County
- Municipality: Kėdainiai district municipality
- Eldership: Pelėdnagiai Eldership

Population (2011)
  - Total: 0
- Time zone: UTC+2 (EET)
  - Summer (DST): UTC+3 (EEST)

Eiguliai ('forest rangers', formerly Russian: Эйгули, Polish: Ejgule) is a village in Kėdainiai district municipality, in Kaunas County, in central Lithuania. According to the 2011 census, the village was uninhabited. It is located between Kėdainiai and Paobelys, by the Obelis river.

== History ==
In the end of the 19th century there was Eiguliai railway station by the Libau–Romny Railway, also Eiguliai folwark (a property of the Geištarai till 1863). Eiguliai village was a church property. In the 1970s almost entire Eiguliai village have been merged to Kėdainiai (now Pramonė Street).

== Demography ==
Historical population

Year	Pop.	±% p.a.
1902	86	—
1923	127	+1.87%
1959	84	−1.14%

Year	Pop.	±% p.a.
1970	50	−4.61%
2001	0	−100.00%
2011	0	0.00%

Source: 1902, 1923, 1959 & 1970, 1979, 1989, 2001, 2011
