= Jagminai =

- Village
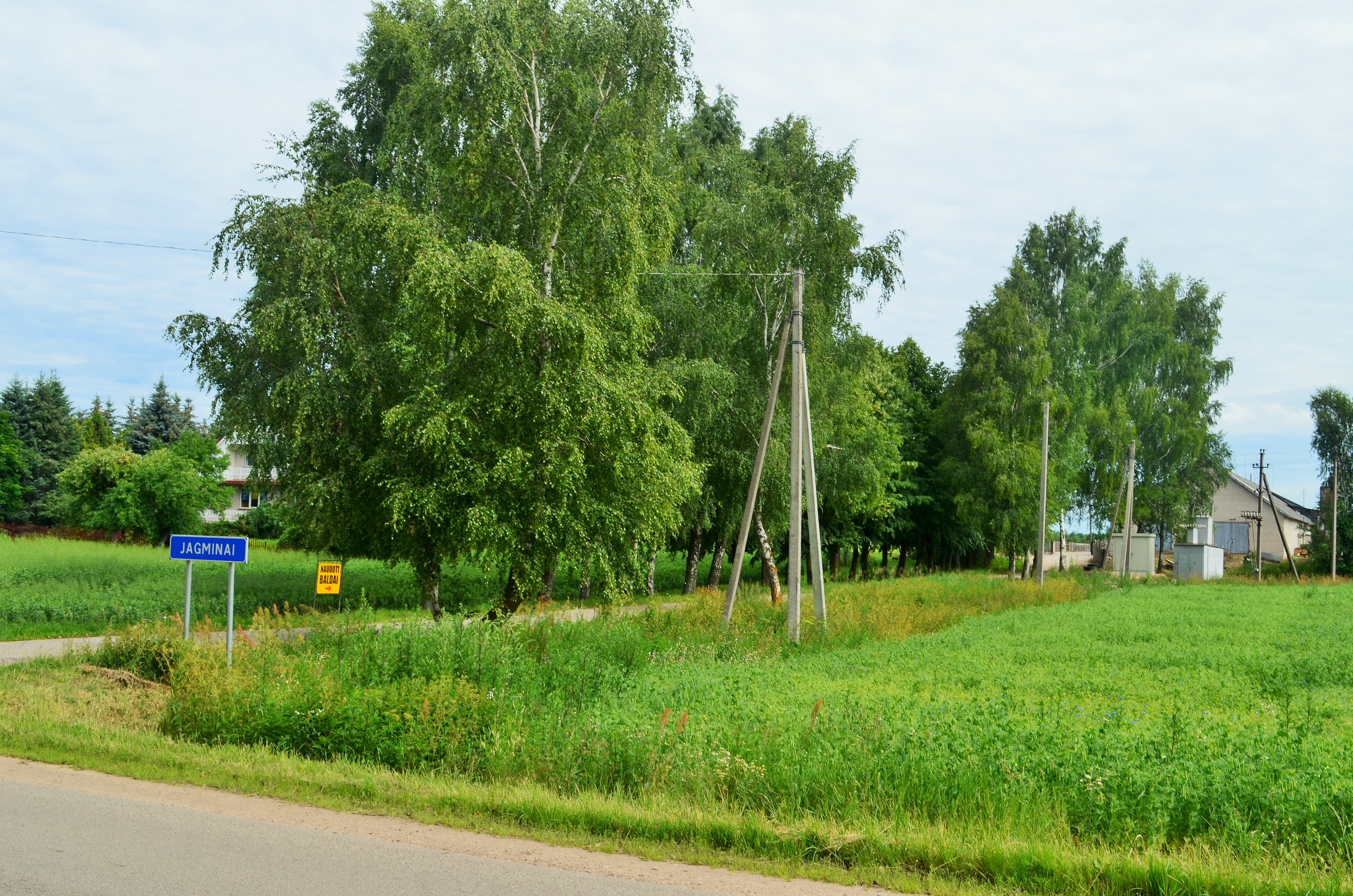

- Location in Lithuania Jagminai (Lithuania)
- Coordinates: 55°13′19″N 24°03′11″E
- Country: Lithuania
- County: Kaunas County
- Municipality: Kėdainiai district municipality
- Eldership: Pelėdnagiai Eldership

Population (2011)
  - Total: 19
- Time zone: UTC+2 (EET)
  - Summer (DST): UTC+3 (EEST)

Jagminai (formerly Russian: Ягмины, Polish: Jagminy) is a village in Kėdainiai district municipality, in Kaunas County, in central Lithuania. According to the 2011 census, the village had a population of 19 people. It is located next to Nociūnai, among a former "Spike" kolkhoz, the Šerkšnys river and the Želksnys grove.

There is a furniture workshop.

== History ==
In the beginning of the 20th century, Jagminai was an okolica, a property of the Vaivados and Levitovai families.

== Demography ==
Historical population

| Year | Pop. | ±% p.a. |
|---|---|---|
| 1903 | 37 | — |
| 1923 | 49 | +1.41% |
| 1959 | 24 | −1.96% |
| 1970 | 15 | −4.18% |

| Year | Pop. | ±% p.a. |
|---|---|---|
| 1979 | 12 | −2.45% |
| 1989 | 11 | −0.87% |
| 2001 | 11 | +0.00% |
| 2011 | 19 | +5.62% |

Source: 1902, 1923, 1959 & 1970, 1979, 1989, 2001, 2011
