= Aukupėnai =

- Village
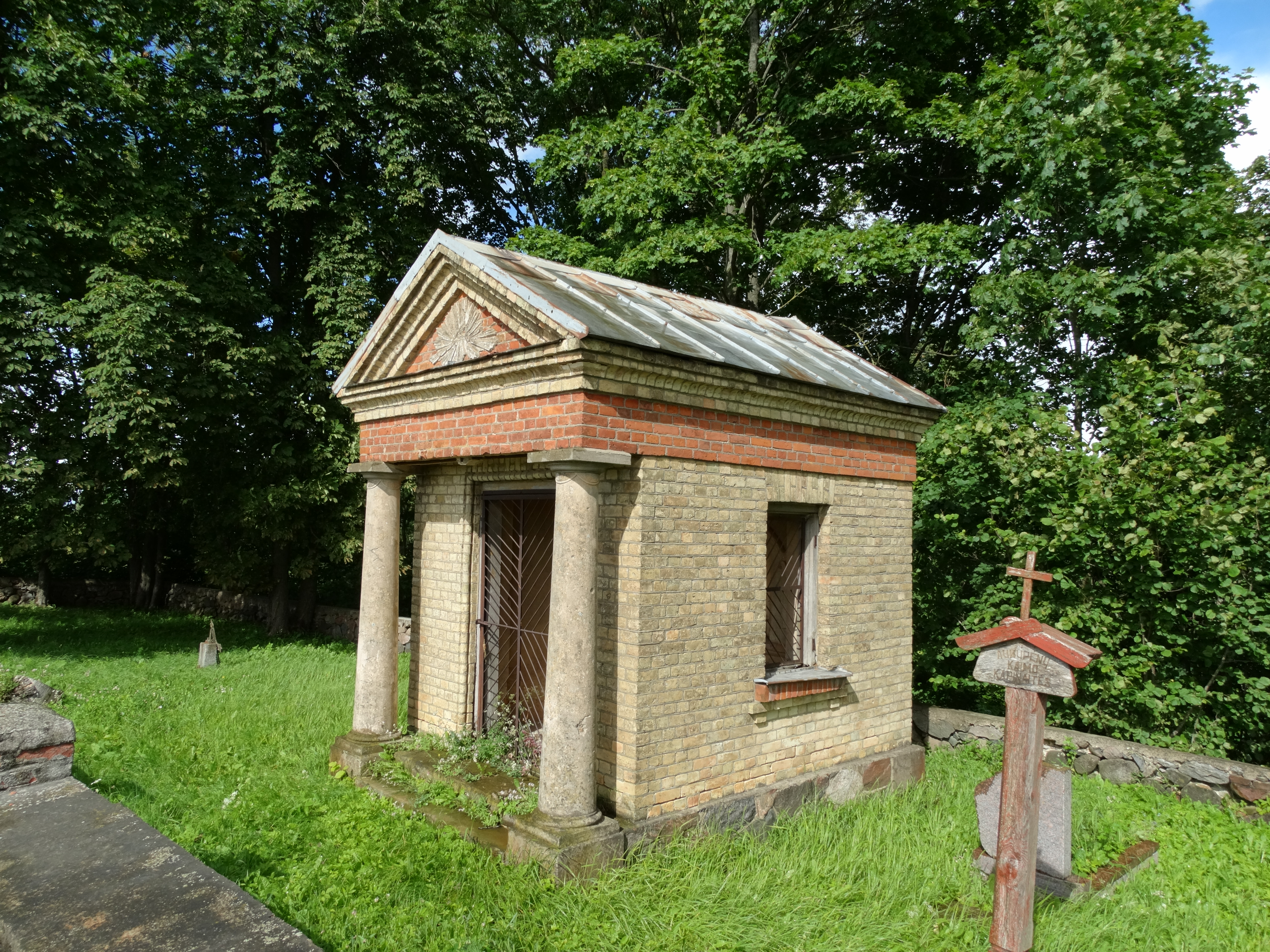

- Location in Lithuania Aukupėnai (Lithuania)
- Coordinates: 55°14′10″N 24°08′31″E
- Country: Lithuania
- County: Kaunas County
- Municipality: Kėdainiai district municipality
- Eldership: Pelėdnagiai Eldership

Population (2011)
  - Total: 7
- Time zone: UTC+2 (EET)
  - Summer (DST): UTC+3 (EEST)

Aukupėnai is a village in Kėdainiai district municipality, in Kaunas County, in central Lithuania. According to the 2011 census, the village had a population of 7 people. It is located 2.5 kilometres (1.6 mi) from Beinaičiai, by the Lankesa river and its tributary the Vaiskulis. There is a cemetery with a tomb-chapel of general Titus Stomma (a cultural heritage object).

== Demography ==
Historical population

| Year | Pop. | ±% p.a. |
|---|---|---|
| 1959 | 39 | — |
| 1970 | 48 | +1.91% |
| 1979 | 33 | −4.08% |

| Year | Pop. | ±% p.a. |
|---|---|---|
| 1989 | 22 | −3.97% |
| 2001 | 7 | −9.10% |
| 2011 | 7 | +0.00% |

Source: 1902, 1923, 1959 & 1970, 1979, 1989, 2001, 2011
