= Pacūnai =

- Village
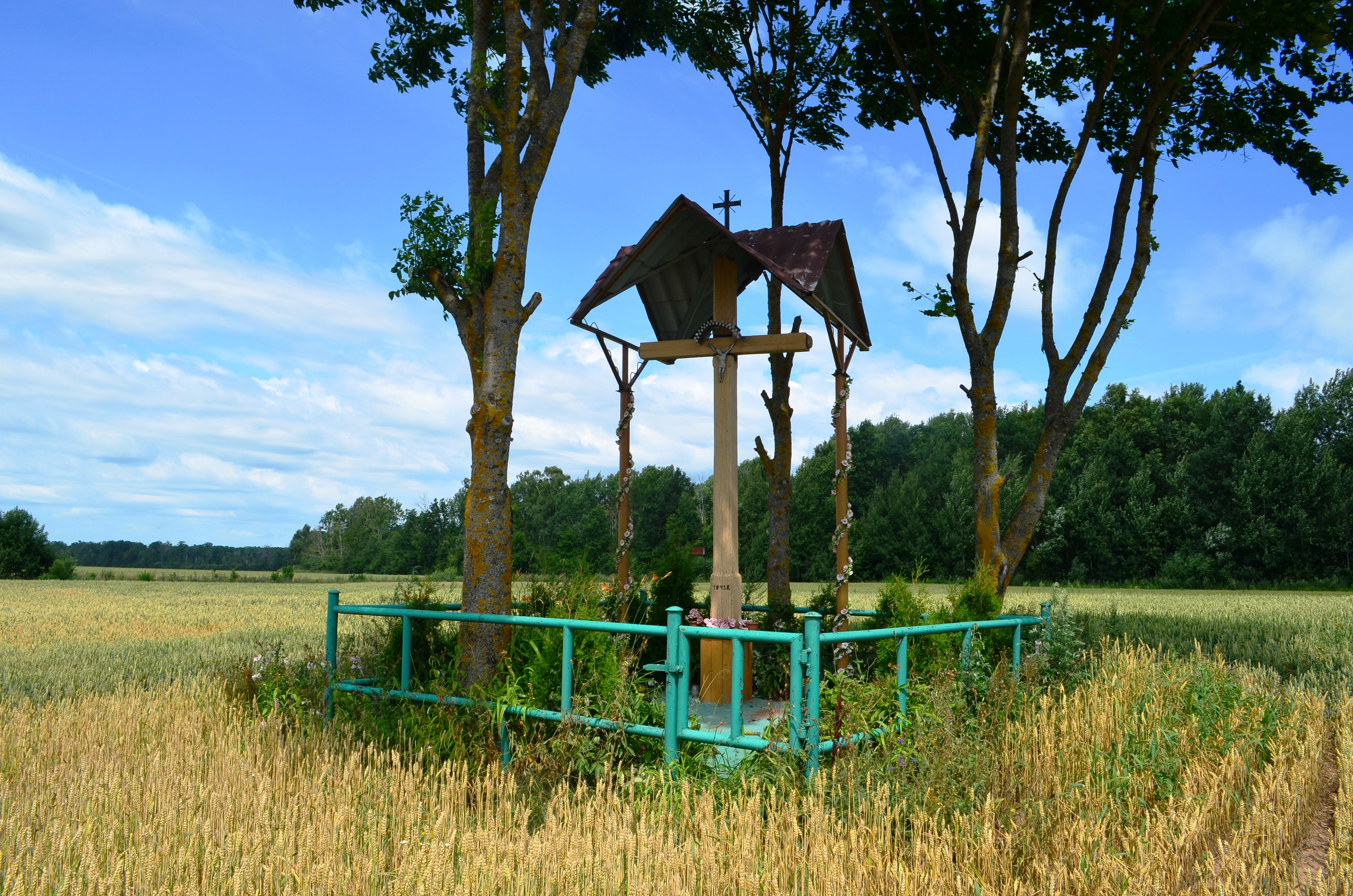
- Memorial cross located in the village.

- Location in Lithuania Pacūnai (Lithuania)
- Coordinates: 55°11′20″N 23°59′30″E
- Country: Lithuania
- County: Kaunas County
- Municipality: Kėdainiai district municipality
- Eldership: Pelėdnagiai Eldership

Population (2011)
  - Total: 0
- Time zone: UTC+2 (EET)
  - Summer (DST): UTC+3 (EEST)

Pacūnai (Pociūnai, formerly Russian: Пацуны, Polish: Pacuny) is a village in Kėdainiai district municipality, in Kaunas County, in central Lithuania. According to the 2011 census, the village was uninhabited. It is located 5 kilometres (3.1 mi) from Nociūnai, by the Mėkla and its tributary the Vilkupis, near the Labūnava Forest. There is a memorial cross for the exiled ones.

At the beginning of the 20th century, there were two Pacūnai okolicas in Babtai volost. They were the property of the Jogintavičiai, Kalvaičiai, Marcinkevičiai, Jurevičiai families.

== Demography ==
Historical population

Year	Pop.	±% p.a.
1902	126	—
1923	87	−1.75%
1959	27	−3.20%
1970	22	−1.84%

Year	Pop.	±% p.a.
1979	4	−17.26%
1989	1	−12.94%
2001	0	−100.00%
2011	0	0.00%

Source: 1902, 1923, 1959 & 1970, 1979, 1989, 2001, 2011
