= Liogailiškiai =

- Village
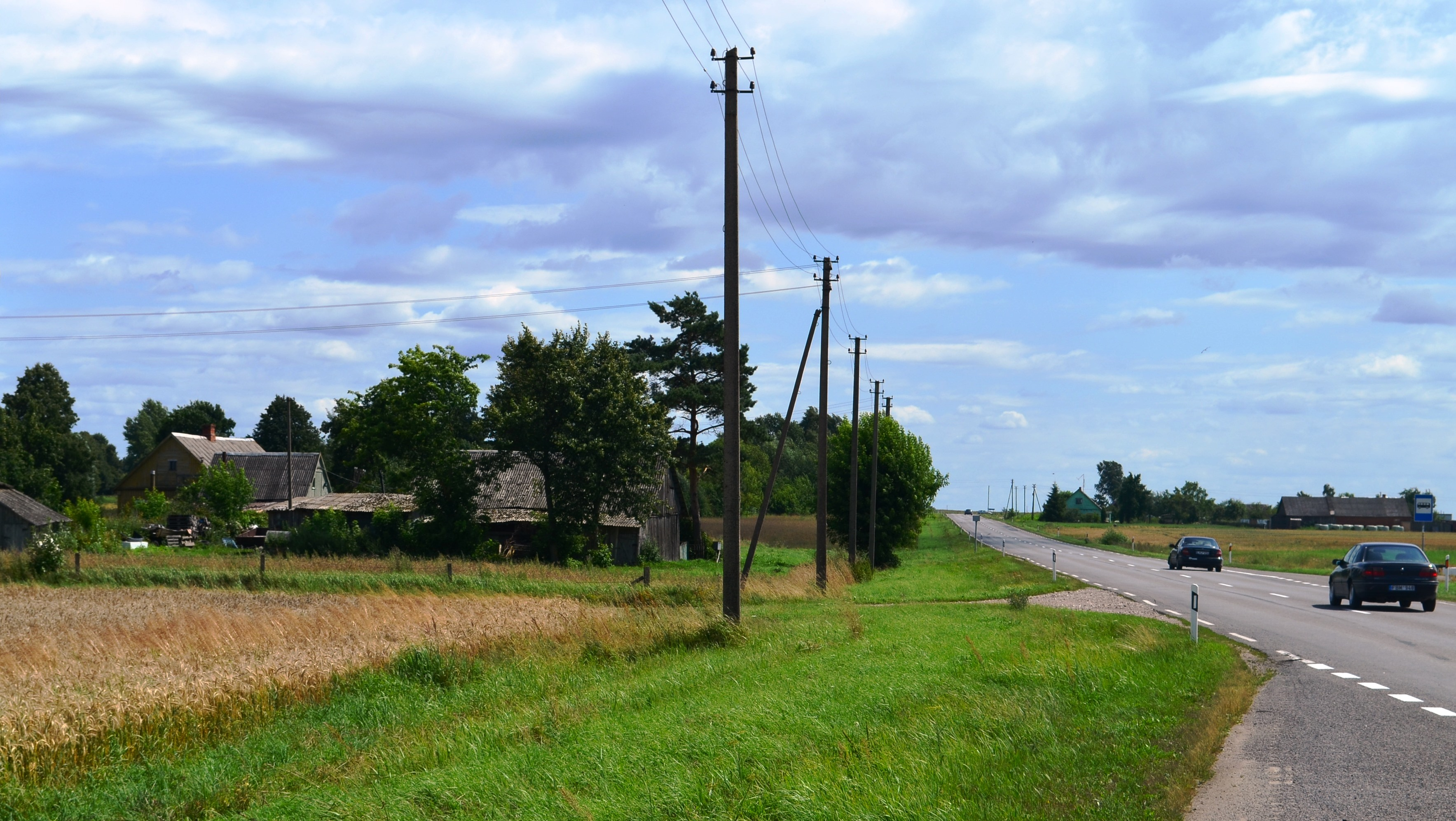

- Location in Lithuania Liogailiškiai (Lithuania)
- Coordinates: 55°14′31″N 23°58′59″E
- Country: Lithuania
- County: Kaunas County
- Municipality: Kėdainiai district municipality
- Eldership: Pelėdnagiai Eldership

Population (2011)
  - Total: 32
- Time zone: UTC+2 (EET)
  - Summer (DST): UTC+3 (EEST)

Liogailiškiai (formerly Russian: Люгайлишки) is a village in Kėdainiai district municipality, in Kaunas County, in central Lithuania. According to the 2011 census, the village had a population of 32 people. It is located 1.5 kilometres (0.93 mi) from Pelėdnagiai, by the Šerkšnys river and the road "Jonava-Šeduva (KK144)".

== Demography ==
Historical population

Year	Pop.	±% p.a.
1902	18	—
1923	64	+6.23%
1959	55	−0.42%
1970	62	+1.10%

Year	Pop.	±% p.a.
1979	46	−3.26%
1989	31	−3.87%
2001	36	+1.25%
2011	32	−1.17%

Source: 1902, 1923, 1959 & 1970, 1979, 1989, 2001, 2011
