= Kruopiai, Kėdainiai =

Kruopiai
- Village
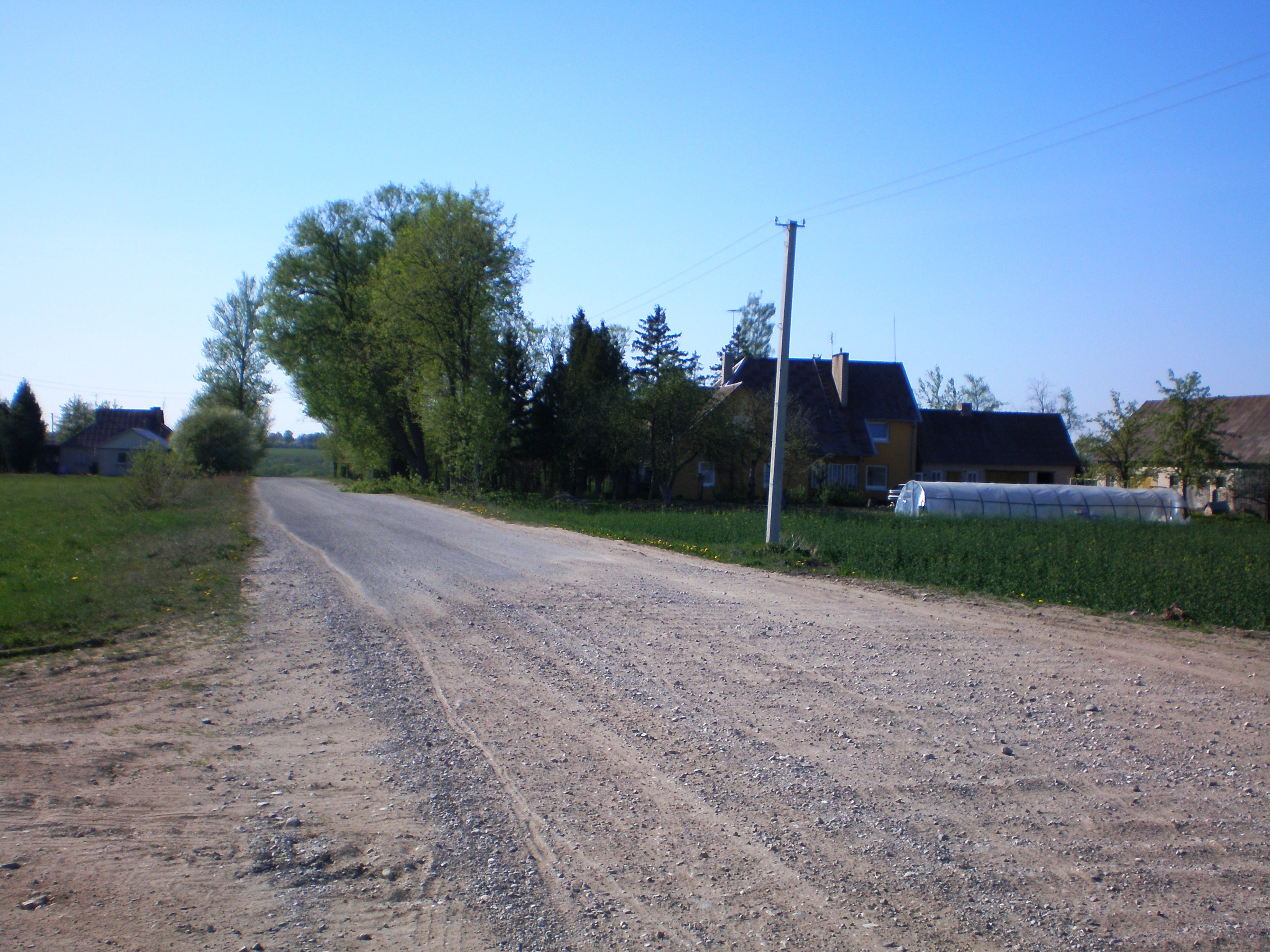

- Location in Lithuania Kruopiai (Lithuania)
- Coordinates: 55°12′14″N 23°54′50″E
- Country: Lithuania
- County: Kaunas County
- Municipality: Kėdainiai district municipality
- Eldership: Pelėdnagiai Eldership

Population (2011)
  - Total: 0
- Time zone: UTC+2 (EET)
  - Summer (DST): UTC+3 (EEST)

Kruopiai (formerly Russian: Кропи, Polish: Kropie) is a village in Kėdainiai district municipality, in Kaunas County, in central Lithuania. According to the 2011 census, the village was uninhabited. It is located 1 kilometre (0.62 mi) from Labūnava, alongside the Kėdainiai-Babtai road, next to the Nevėžis river.

== History ==
During the 1970s, Kruopiai was merged to Labūnava and became its northern part. Later, some further homesteads were again declared as Kruopiai village.

== Demography ==
Historical population

Year	Pop.	±% p.a.
1902	164	—
1923	194	+0.80%
1959	99	−1.85%

Year	Pop.	±% p.a.
1970	183	+5.74%
2001	5	−10.96%
2011	0	−100.00%

Source: 1902, 1923, 1959 & 1970, 1979, 1989, 2001, 2011

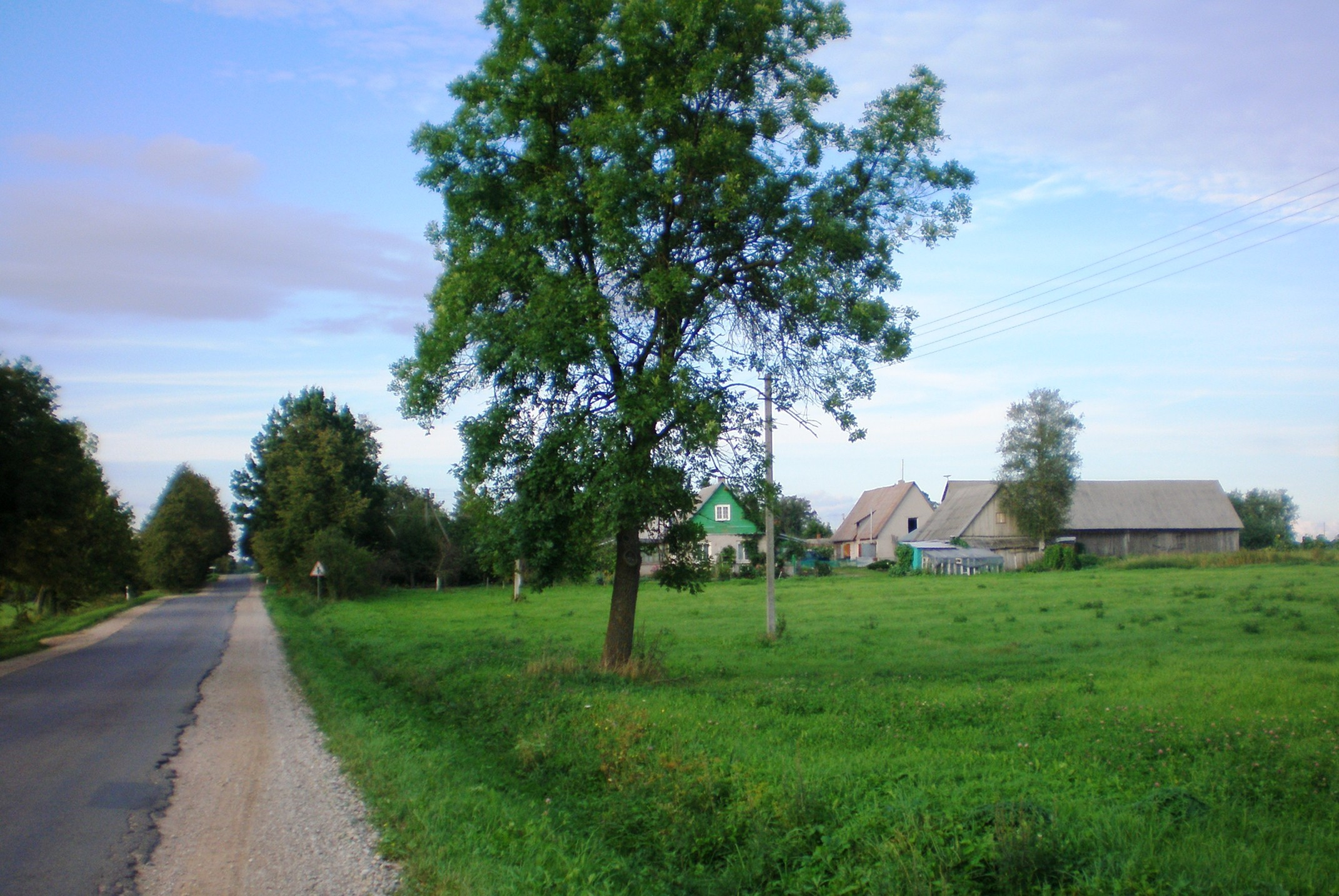
Kruopiai village next to Labūnava
