= Puzaičiai =

- Village
- Location in Lithuania Puzaičiai (Lithuania)
- Coordinates: 55°11′54″N 23°58′30″E
- Country: Lithuania
- County: Kaunas County
- Municipality: Kėdainiai district municipality
- Eldership: Pelėdnagiai Eldership

Population (2011)
  - Total: 0
- Time zone: UTC+2 (EET)
  - Summer (DST): UTC+3 (EEST)

Puzaičiai (formerly Russian: Пузайце, Polish: Puzajcie) is a village in Kėdainiai district municipality, in Kaunas County, in central Lithuania. According to the 2011 census, the village was uninhabited. It is located 4.5 kilometres (2.8 mi) from Labūnava, near the Mėkla river and the Puzaičiai Forest.

== Demography ==
Historical population

Year	Pop.	±% p.a.
1923	79	—
1959	47	−1.43%
1970	33	−3.16%
1979	0	−100.00%

Year	Pop.	±% p.a.
1989	0	0.00%
2001	0	0.00%
2011	0	0.00%

Source: 1902, 1923, 1959 & 1970, 1979, 1989, 2001, 2011
