= Pašiliai, Kėdainiai =

Pašiliai
- Village
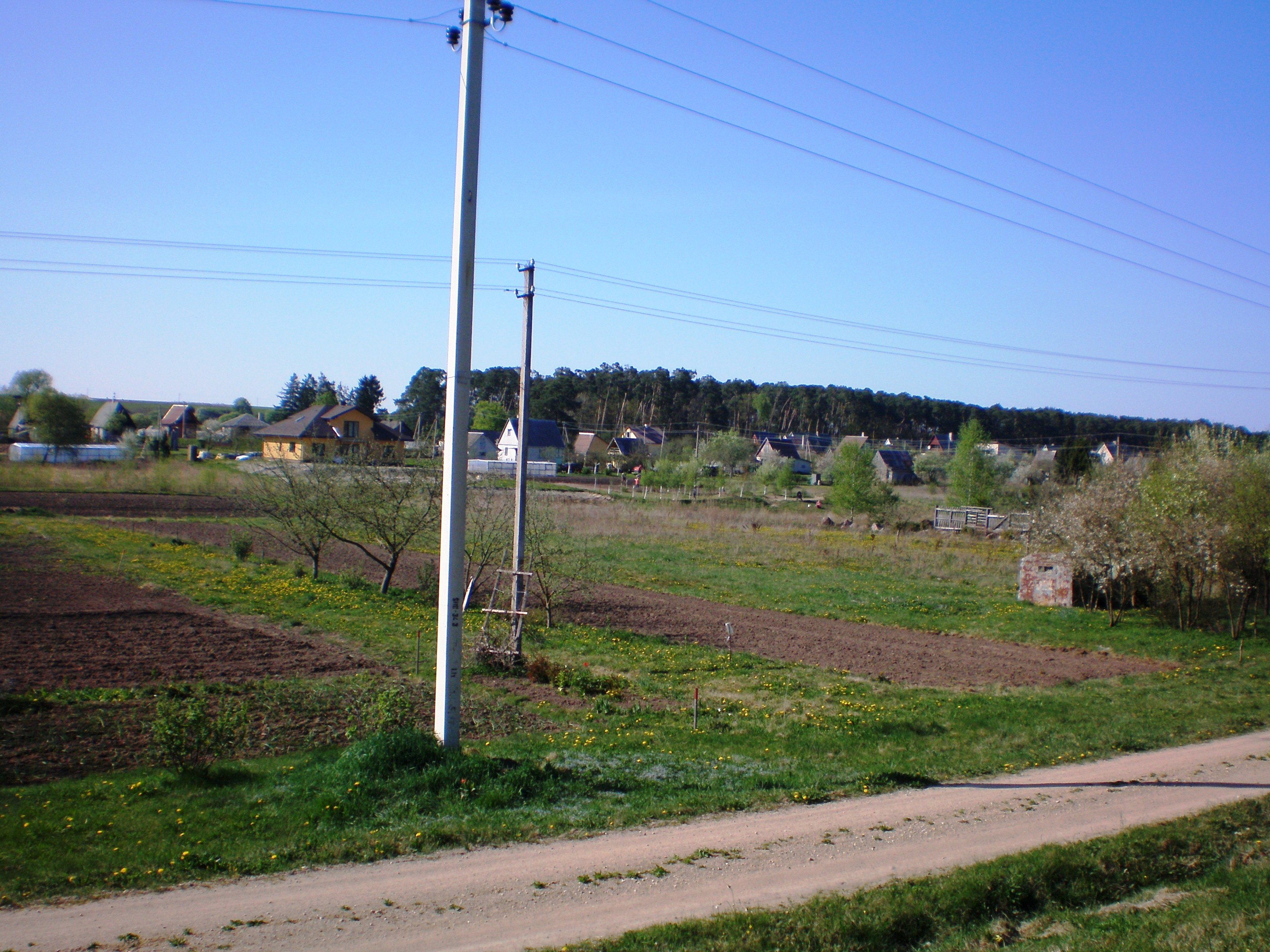

- Location in Lithuania Pašiliai (Lithuania)
- Coordinates: 55°13′59″N 23°56′10″E
- Country: Lithuania
- County: Kaunas County
- Municipality: Kėdainiai district municipality
- Eldership: Pelėdnagiai Eldership

Population (2011)
  - Total: 197
- Time zone: UTC+2 (EET)
  - Summer (DST): UTC+3 (EEST)

Pašiliai ('place by pinewood', formerly Russian: Подборкъ, Polish: Podborek) is a village in Kėdainiai district municipality, in Kaunas County, in central Lithuania. According to the 2011 census, the village had a population of 197 people. It is located 4 kilometres (2.5 mi) from Labūnava, 6 kilometres (3.7 mi) from Kėdainiai, on the left bank of the Nevėžis river, next to the Pašiliai Forest.

Pašiliai is a collective gardening area (gardening cooperatives "Vasara", "Kooperatyvas", "Pašilė", "Kristalas", "Obelėlė", "Kosmosas", "Progresas" are located here). The area features a former cemetery site, and a former folwark (manor farm) building with the remnants of a park.

== History ==
At the beginning of the 20th century, there was Pašiliai (Podborek) estate and folwark. During the Soviet era, it was transformed into Kėdainiai collective gardening area.

== Demography ==
Historical population

Year	Pop.	±% p.a.
1902	68	—
1923	73	+0.34%
1959	65	−0.32%
1970	58	−1.03%

Year	Pop.	±% p.a.
1979	54	−0.79%
1989	30	−5.71%
2001	37	+1.76%
2011	197	+18.20%

Source: 1902, 1923, 1959 & 1970, 1979, 1989, 2001, 2011

== Images ==
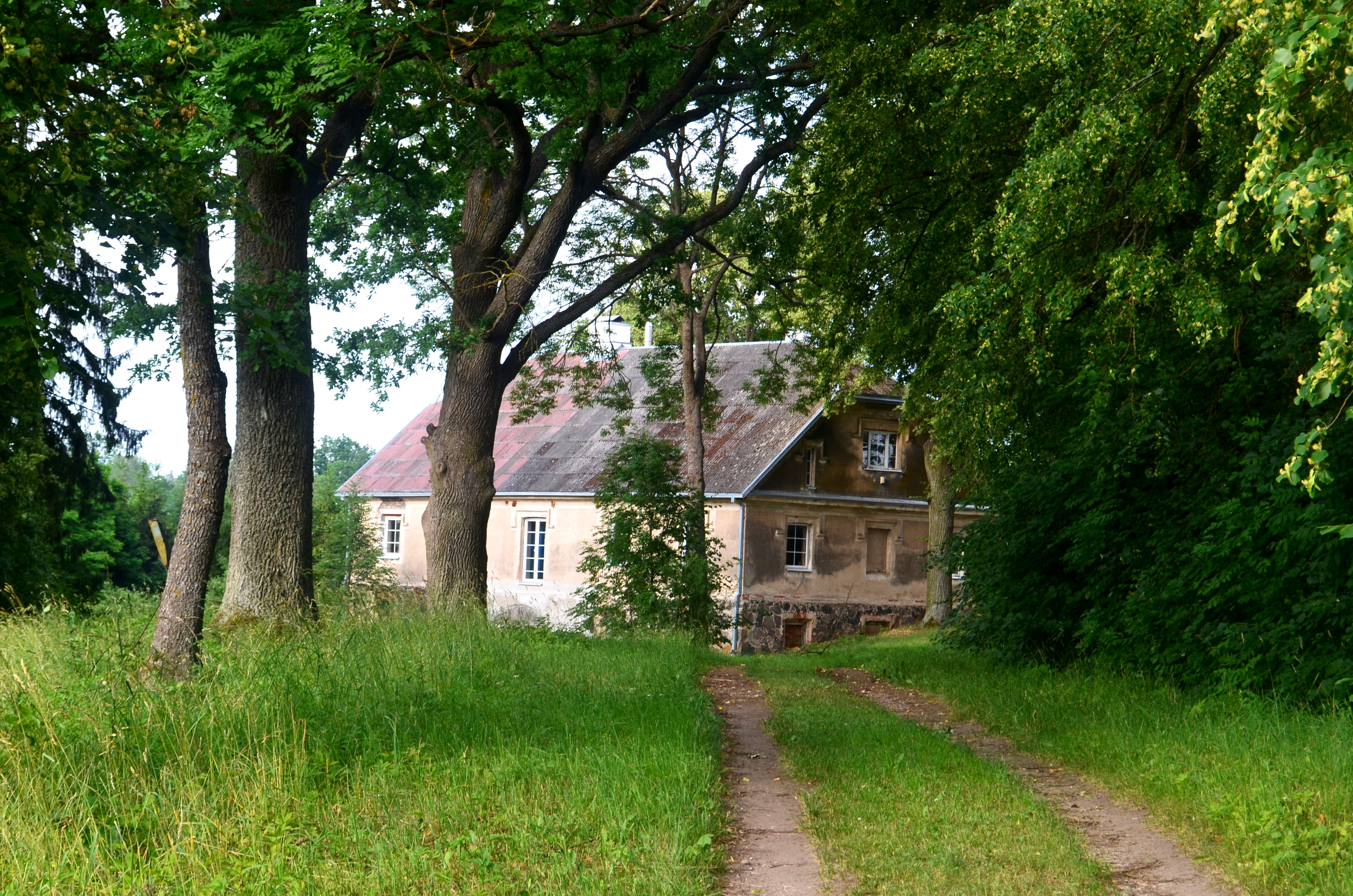
Former Pašiliai manor

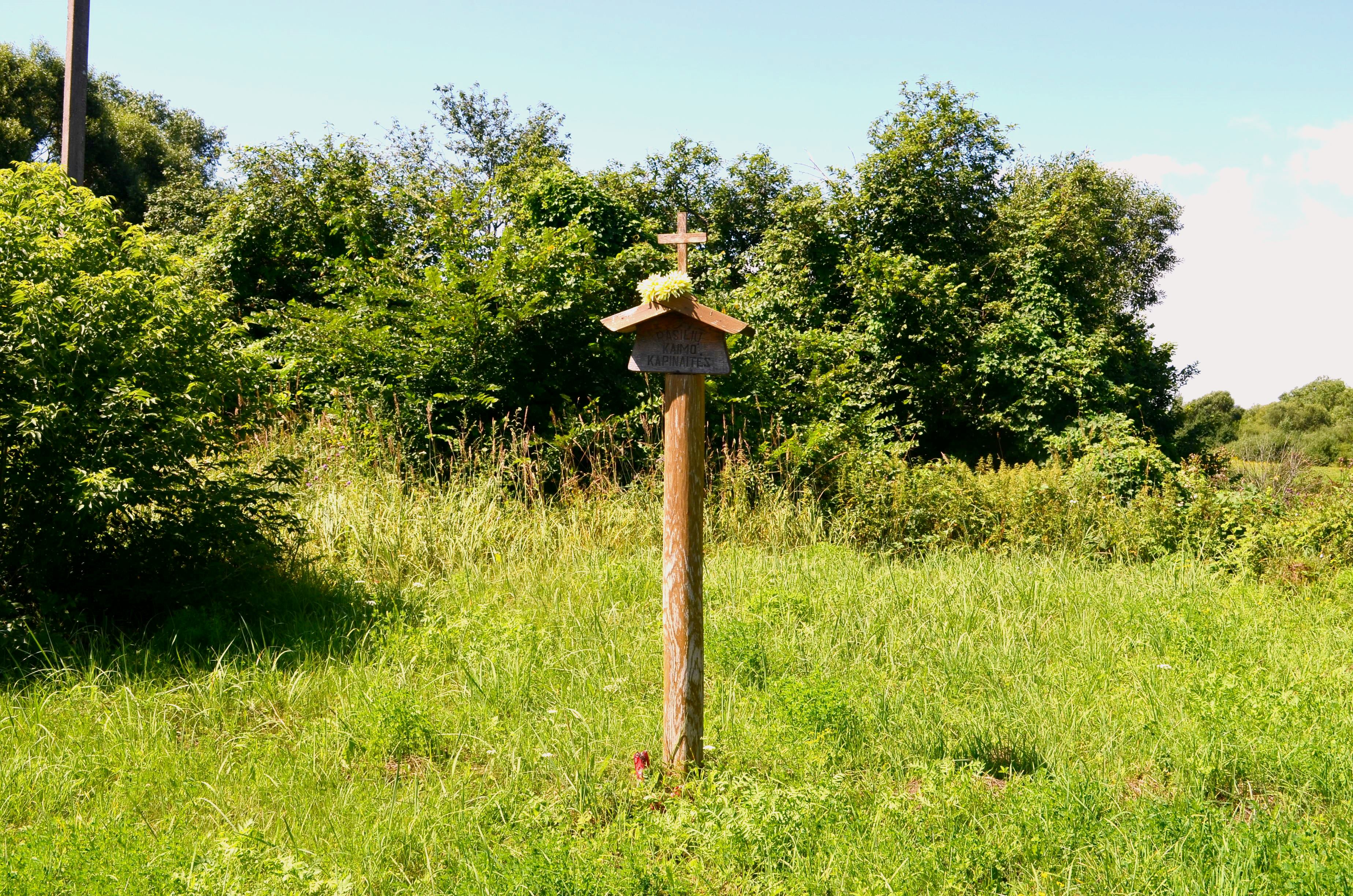
Former cemetery site

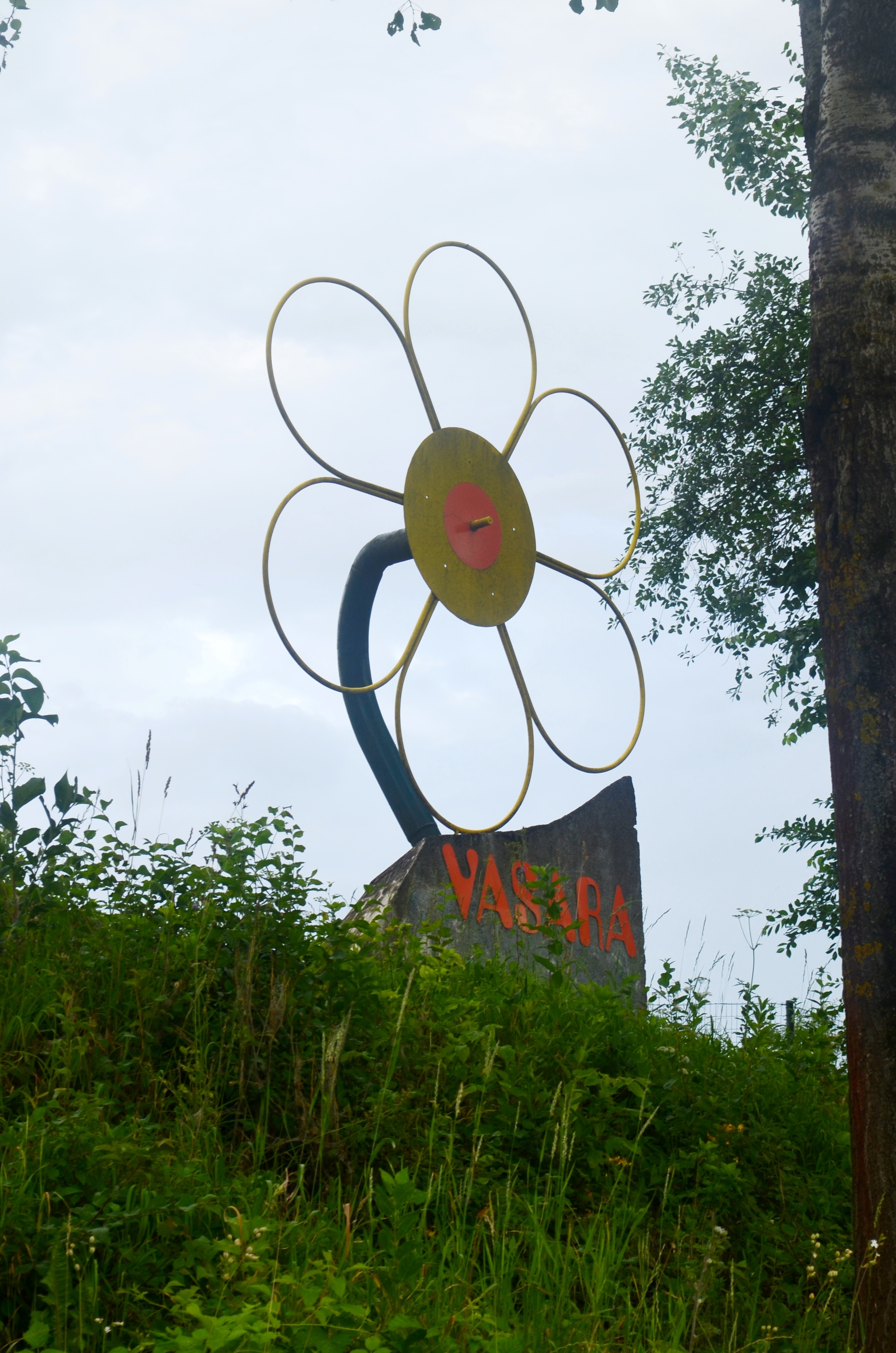
A sign of "Vasara" ('summer') cooperative

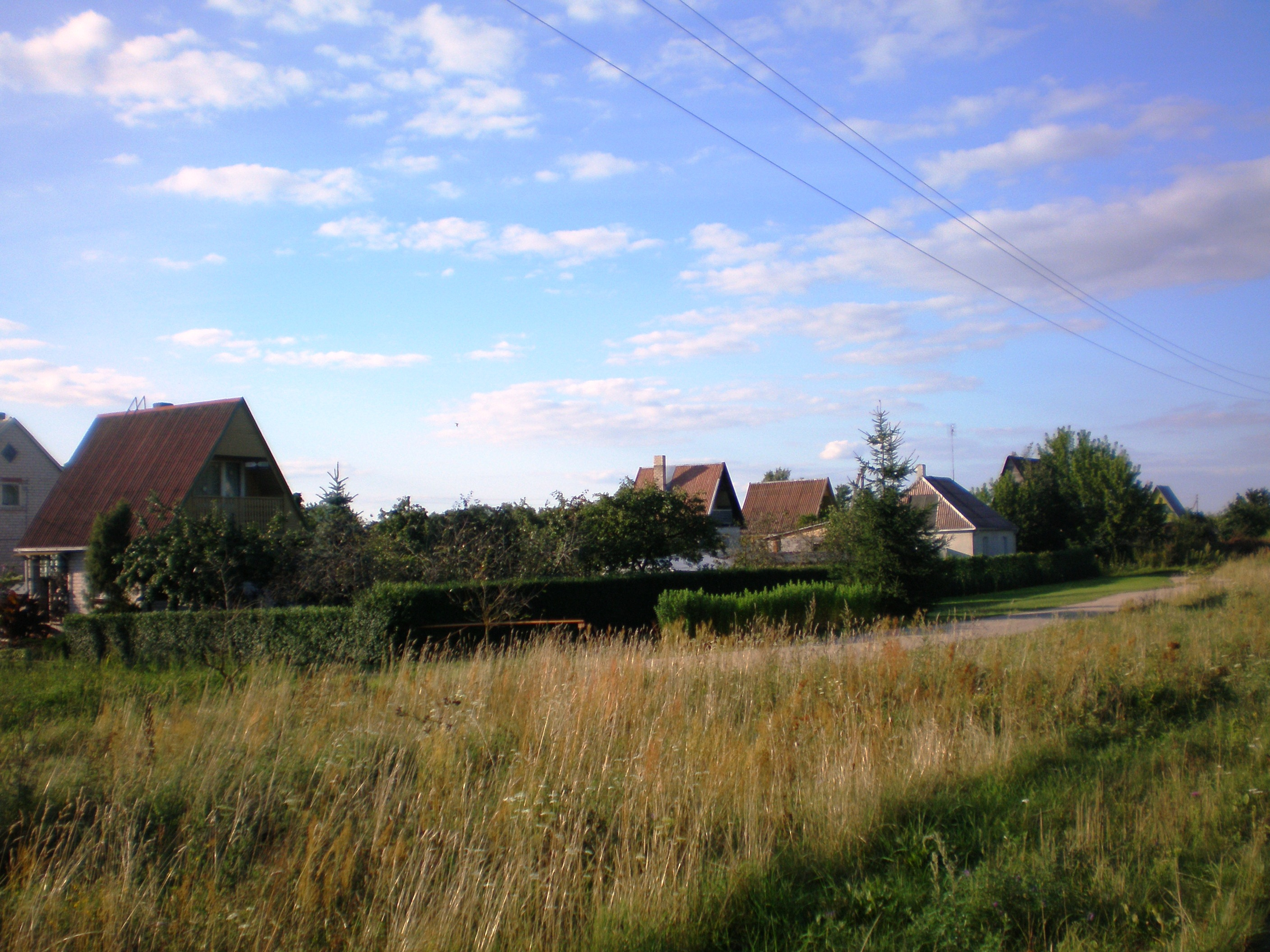
Pašiliai
