= Lineliai, Kėdainiai =

Lineliai
- Village
- Location in Lithuania Lineliai (Lithuania)
- Coordinates: 55°10′11″N 23°53′22″E
- Country: Lithuania
- County: Kaunas County
- Municipality: Kėdainiai district municipality
- Eldership: Pelėdnagiai Eldership

Population (2011)
  - Total: 0
- Time zone: UTC+2 (EET)
  - Summer (DST): UTC+3 (EEST)

Lineliai is a village in Kėdainiai district municipality, in Kaunas County, in central Lithuania. According to the 2011 census, the village was uninhabited. It is located 5 kilometres (3.1 mi) from Pelėdnagiai, by the Urka river.

It was established in the lands of Mladochovo folwark.

== Demography ==
Historical population

Year	Pop.	±% p.a.
1959	63	—
1970	17	−11.23%
1979	0	−100.00%

Year	Pop.	±% p.a.
1989	0	0.00%
2001	0	0.00%
2011	0	0.00%

Source: 1902, 1923, 1959 & 1970, 1979, 1989, 2001, 2011
