= Akmeniai, Kėdainiai =

Akmeniai
- Village
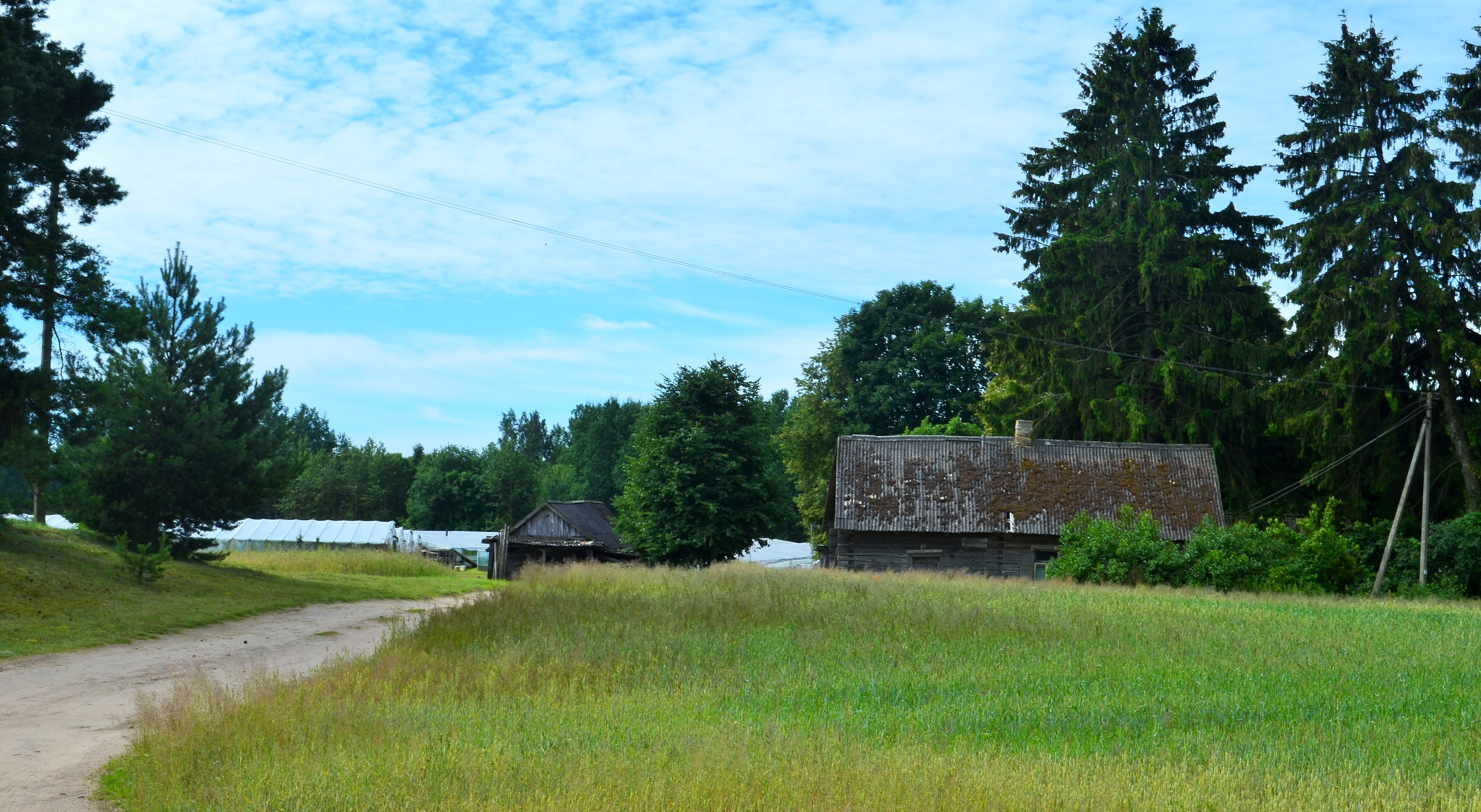

- Location in Lithuania Akmeniai (Lithuania)
- Coordinates: 55°12′29″N 24°06′50″E
- Country: Lithuania
- County: Kaunas County
- Municipality: Kėdainiai district municipality
- Eldership: Pelėdnagiai Eldership

Area
  - Total: 0.01 km^{2} (0.0039 sq mi)

Population (2011)
  - Total: 9
- Time zone: UTC+2 (EET)
  - Summer (DST): UTC+3 (EEST)

Akmeniai ('stony places', formerly Russian: Окмяны, Polish: Okmiany) is a village in Kėdainiai district municipality, in Kaunas County, in central Lithuania. According to the 2011 census, the village had a population of 9 people. It is located 2 kilometres (1.2 mi) from Beinaičiai, next to the Vilnius-Šiauliai railway and the Raistas Forest.

== History ==
During the Soviet era, a part of the village was split and transferred to Jonava District Municipality (Akmeniai, Jonava).

== Demography ==
Historical population

Year	Pop.	±% p.a.
1902	193	—
1923	177	−0.41%
1959	82	−2.11%
1970	97	+1.54%

Year	Pop.	±% p.a.
1979	110	+1.41%
1989	22	−14.87%
2001	10	−6.36%
2011	9	−1.05%

Source: 1902, 1923, 1959 & 1970, 1979, 1989, 2001, 2011

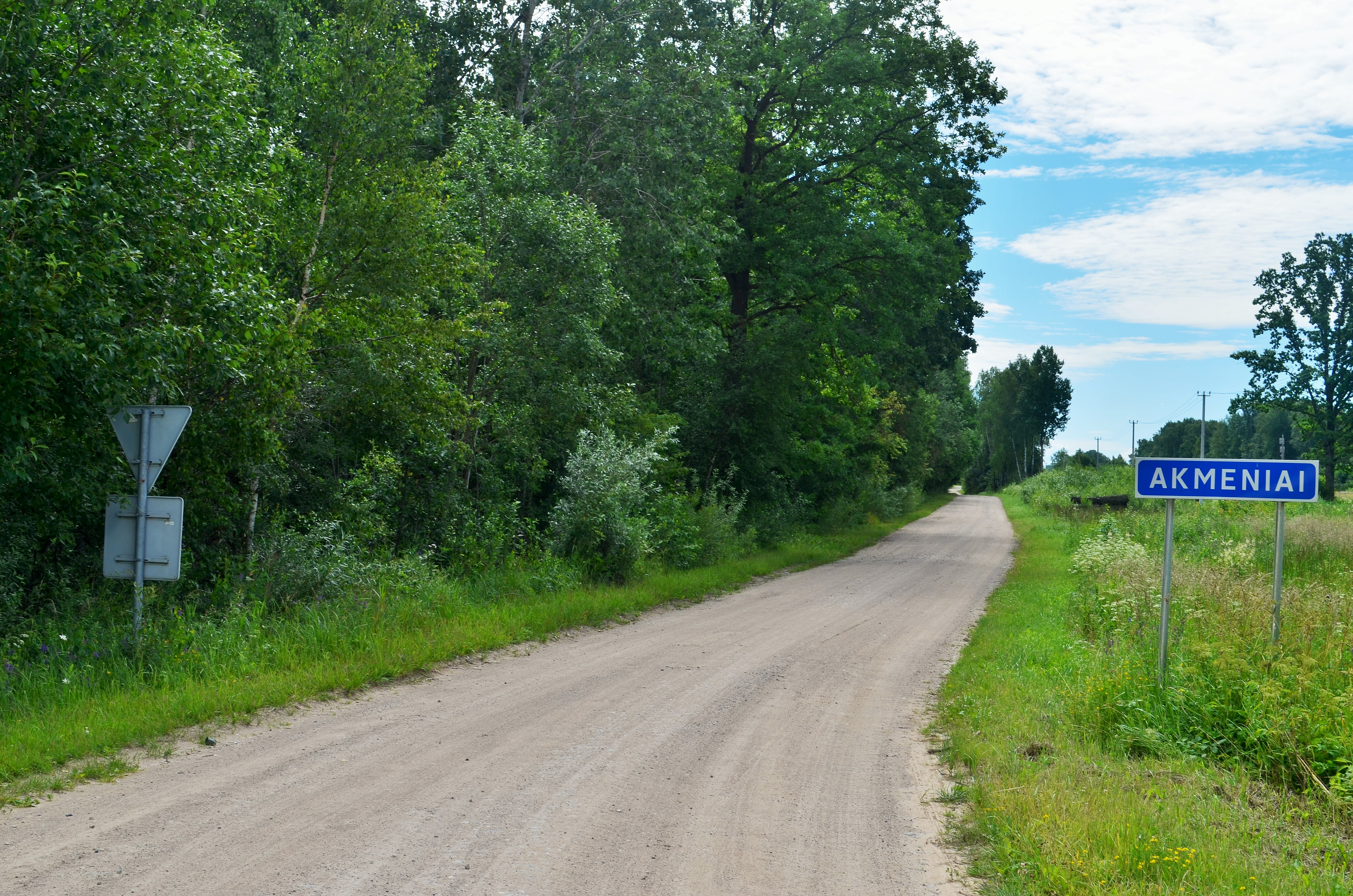
Akmeniai roadsign
