= Ivaniškiai, Pelėdnagiai =

Ivaniškiai
- Village
- Location in Lithuania Ivaniškiai (Lithuania)
- Coordinates: 55°16′08″N 24°08′49″E
- Country: Lithuania
- County: Kaunas County
- Municipality: Kėdainiai district municipality
- Eldership: Pelėdnagiai Eldership

Population (2011)
  - Total: 0
- Time zone: UTC+2 (EET)
  - Summer (DST): UTC+3 (EEST)

Ivaniškiai is a village in Kėdainiai district municipality, in Kaunas County, in central Lithuania. According to the 2011 census, the village was uninhabited. It is located 0.5 kilometres (0.31 mi) from Aukštieji Kapliai, by the Bubliai Reservoir.

== Demography ==
Historical population

Year	Pop.	±% p.a.
1923	43	—
1959	8	−4.56%
1970	17	+7.09%
1979	7	−9.39%

Year	Pop.	±% p.a.
1989	0	−100.00%
2001	0	0.00%
2011	0	0.00%

Source: 1902, 1923, 1959 & 1970, 1979, 1989, 2001, 2011
