= Užkapiai =

- Village
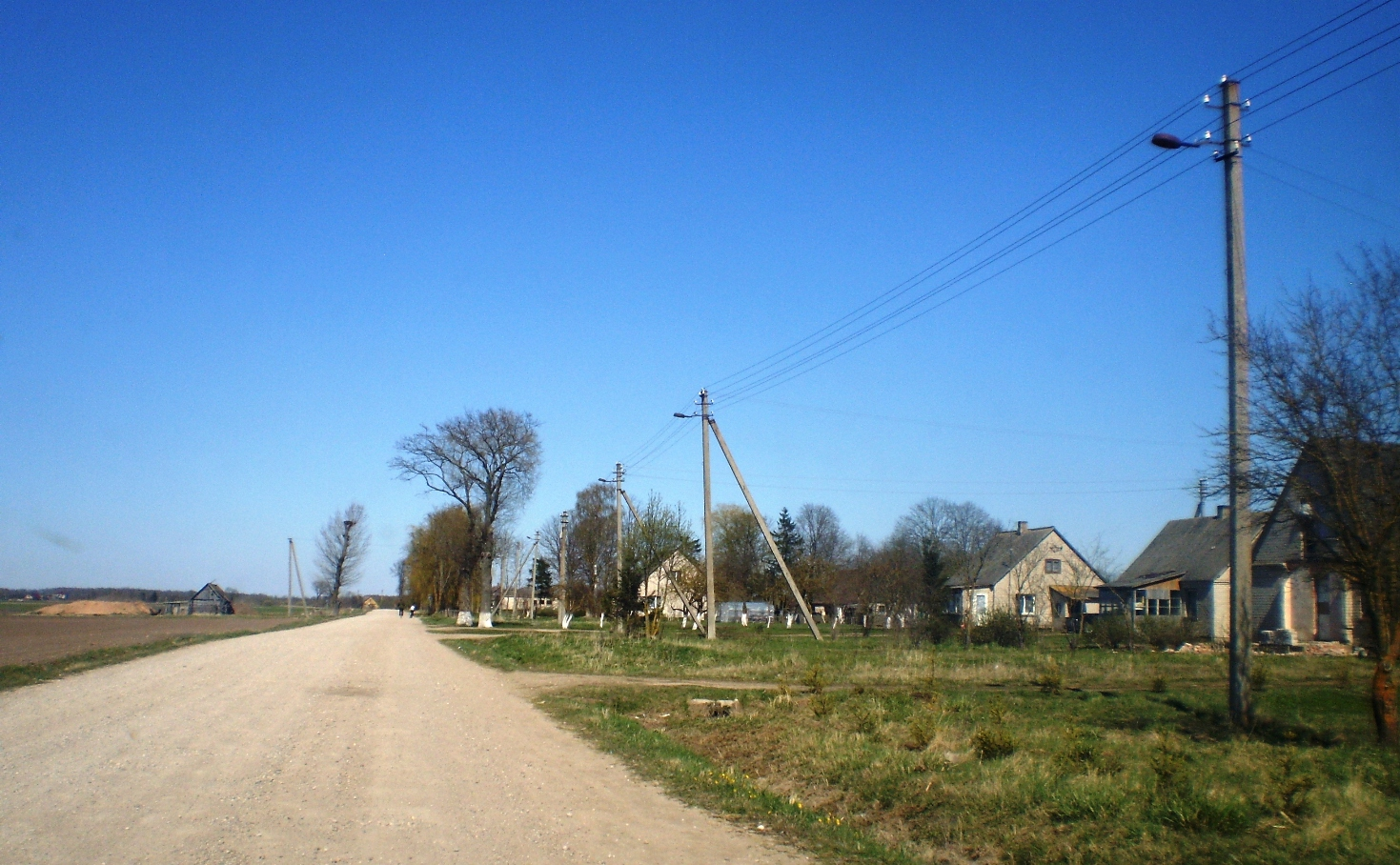

- Location in Lithuania Užkapiai (Lithuania)
- Coordinates: 55°15′00″N 24°09′29″E
- Country: Lithuania
- County: Kaunas County
- Municipality: Kėdainiai district municipality
- Eldership: Pelėdnagiai Eldership

Population (2011)
  - Total: 99
- Time zone: UTC+2 (EET)
  - Summer (DST): UTC+3 (EEST)

Užkapiai ('place beyond graves', formerly Russian: Ушкопе, Ужкапяй, Polish: Uszkopie) is a village in Kėdainiai district municipality, in Kaunas County, in central Lithuania. According to the 2011 census, the village had a population of 99 people. It is located 7 kilometres (4.3 mi) from Šėta, along the Nociūnai-Šėta road, by the Lankesa river and the Bubliai Reservoir. The Lankesa Botanical Sanctuary is located next to Užkapiai.

In the end of the 19th century Užkapiai was an estate, a property of the Virbickai and the Narkevičiai families.

== Demography ==
Historical population

Year	Pop.	±% p.a.
1902	159	—
1923	168	+0.26%
1959	146	−0.39%
1970	117	−1.99%

Year	Pop.	±% p.a.
1979	132	+1.35%
1989	92	−3.55%
2001	108	+1.35%
2011	99	−0.87%

Source: 1902, 1923, 1959 & 1970, 1979, 1989, 2001, 2011

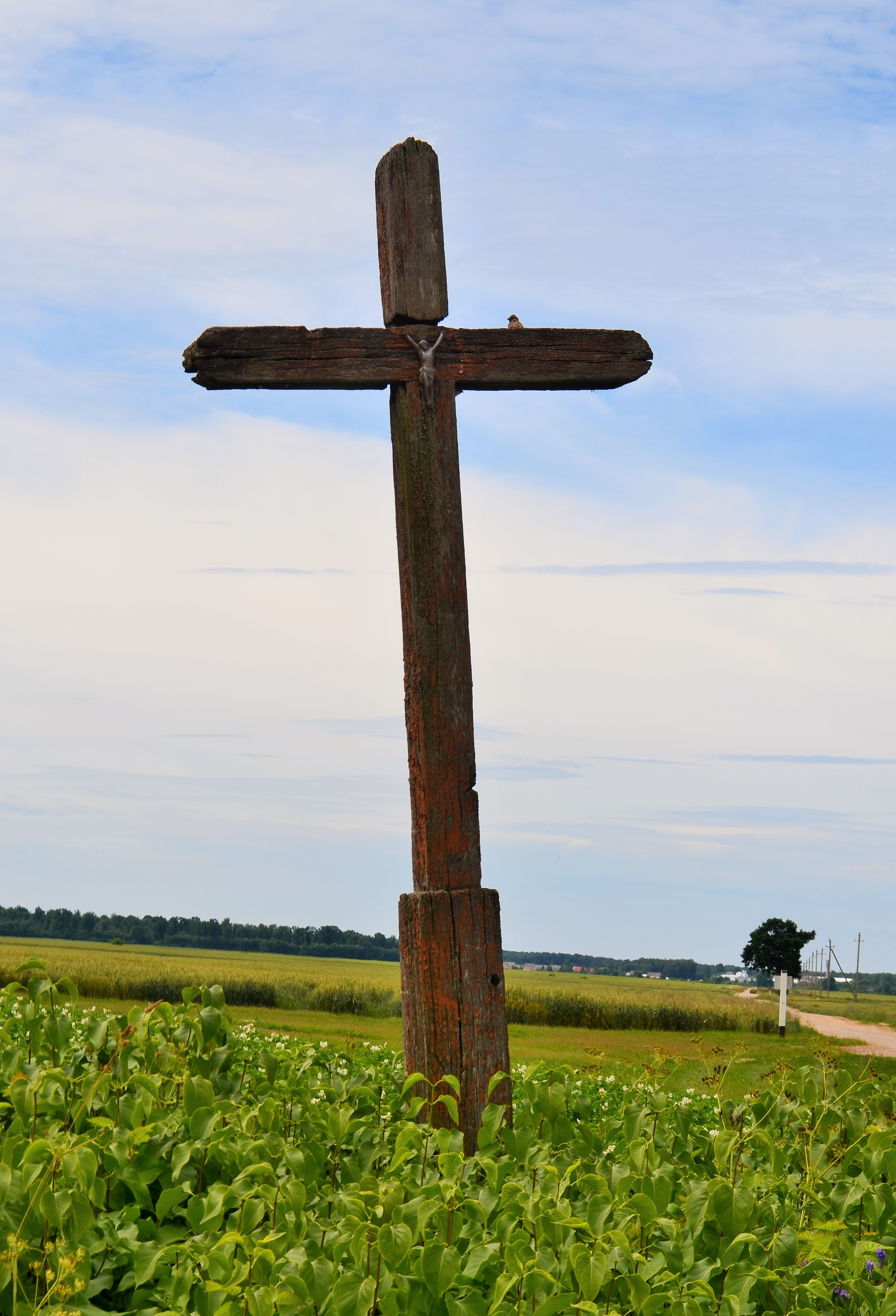
Wayside cross in Užkapiai
