= Šilainėliai =

- Village
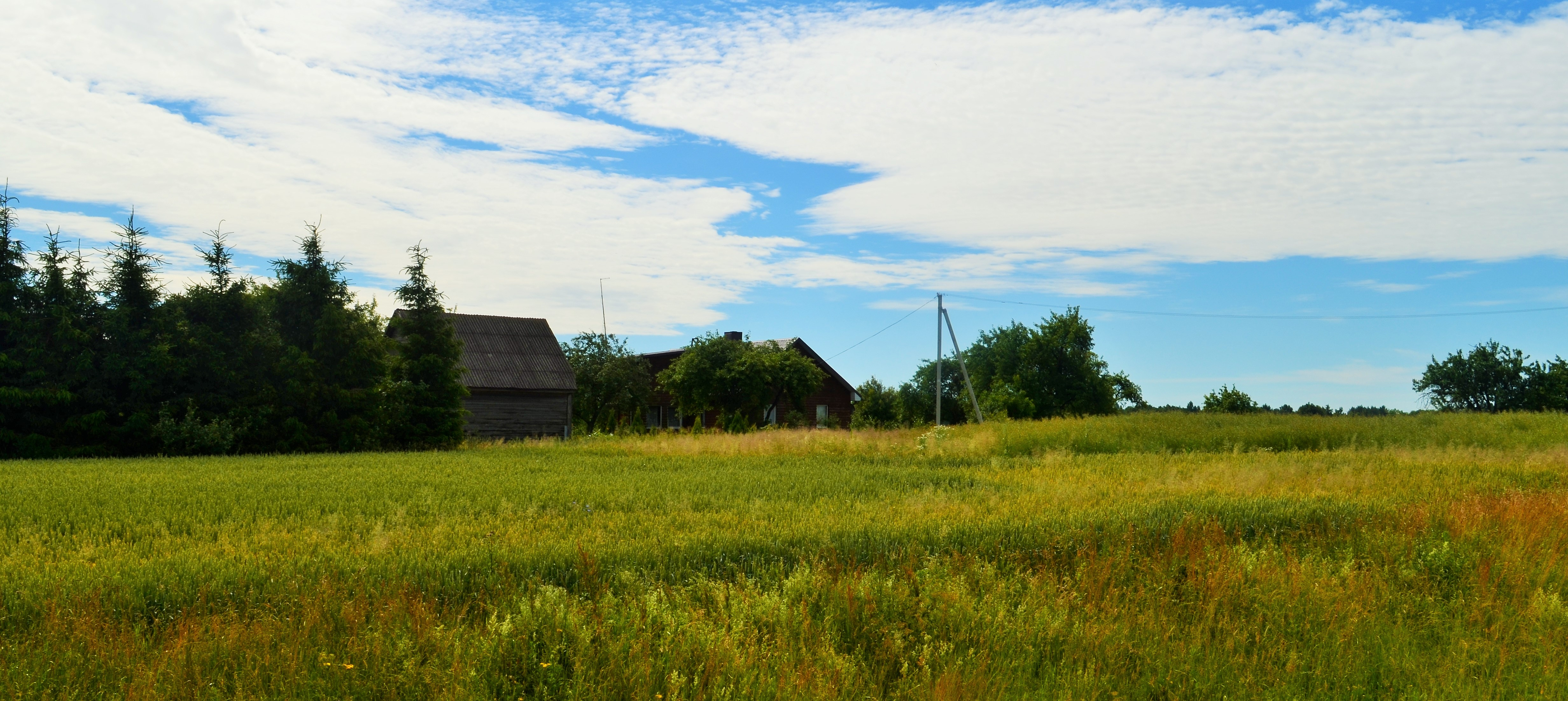

- Location in Lithuania Šilainėliai (Lithuania)
- Coordinates: 55°15′11″N 24°04′01″E
- Country: Lithuania
- County: Kaunas County
- Municipality: Kėdainiai district municipality
- Eldership: Pelėdnagiai Eldership

Population (2011)
  - Total: 7
- Time zone: UTC+2 (EET)
  - Summer (DST): UTC+3 (EEST)

Šilainėliai (formerly Russian: Шилайнели, Polish: Szyłajnele) is a village in Kėdainiai district municipality, in Kaunas County, in central Lithuania. According to the 2011 census, the village had a population of 7 people. It is located 1 kilometre (0.62 mi) from Nociūnai, alongside the A8 highway, by the Šerkšnys river, next to the Želksnys forest and the "Lifosa" phosphogypsum dump site.

It was a selsovet center till the 1954. It was a linear settlement.

== Demography ==
Historical population

Year	Pop.	±% p.a.
1902	161	—
1923	168	+0.20%
1959	149	−0.33%
1970	132	−1.10%

Year	Pop.	±% p.a.
1979	37	−13.18%
1989	9	−13.18%
2001	6	−3.32%
2011	7	+1.55%

Source: 1902, 1923, 1959 & 1970, 1979, 1989, 2001, 2011

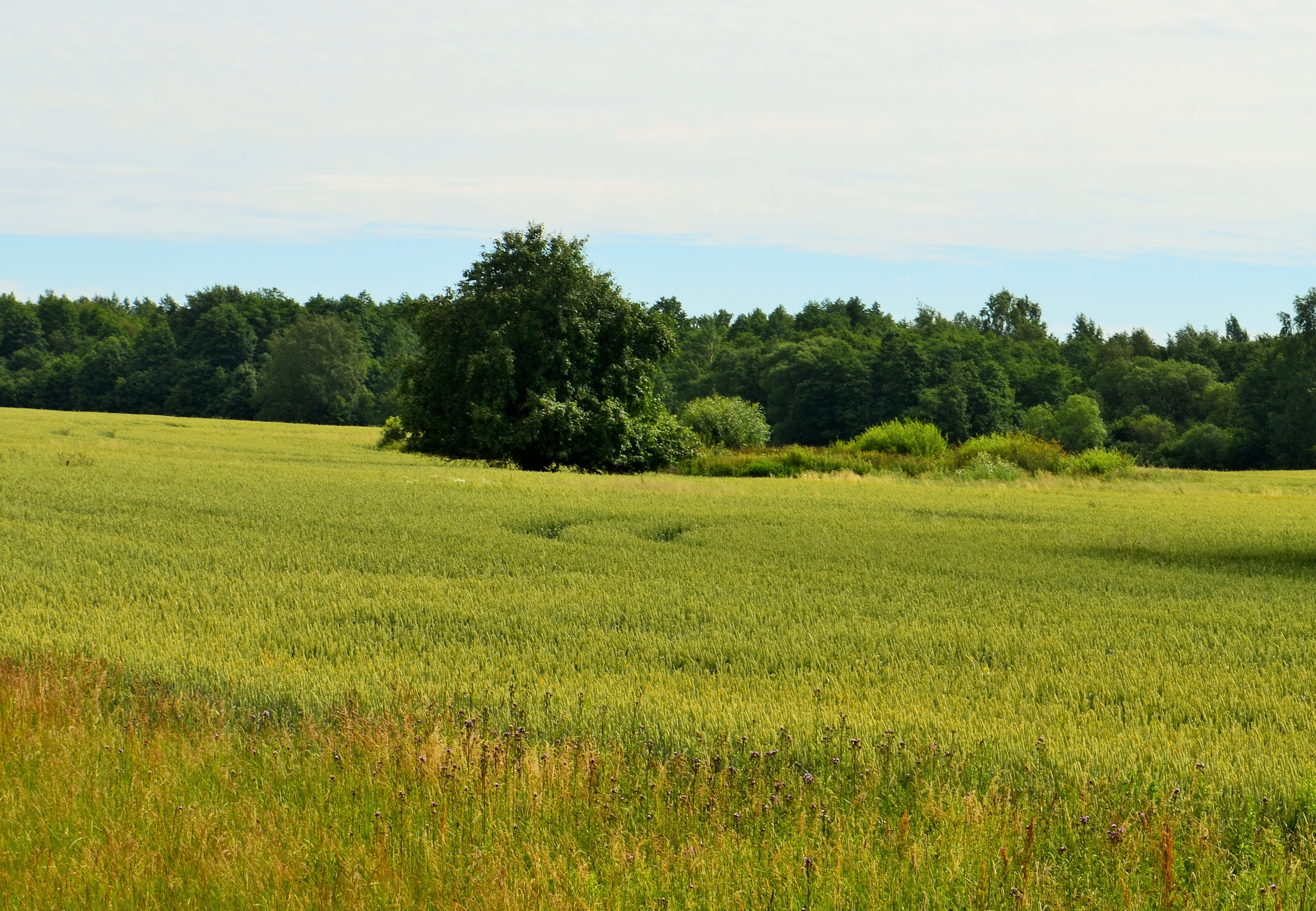
A former homestead site
