= Juciūnai =

- Village
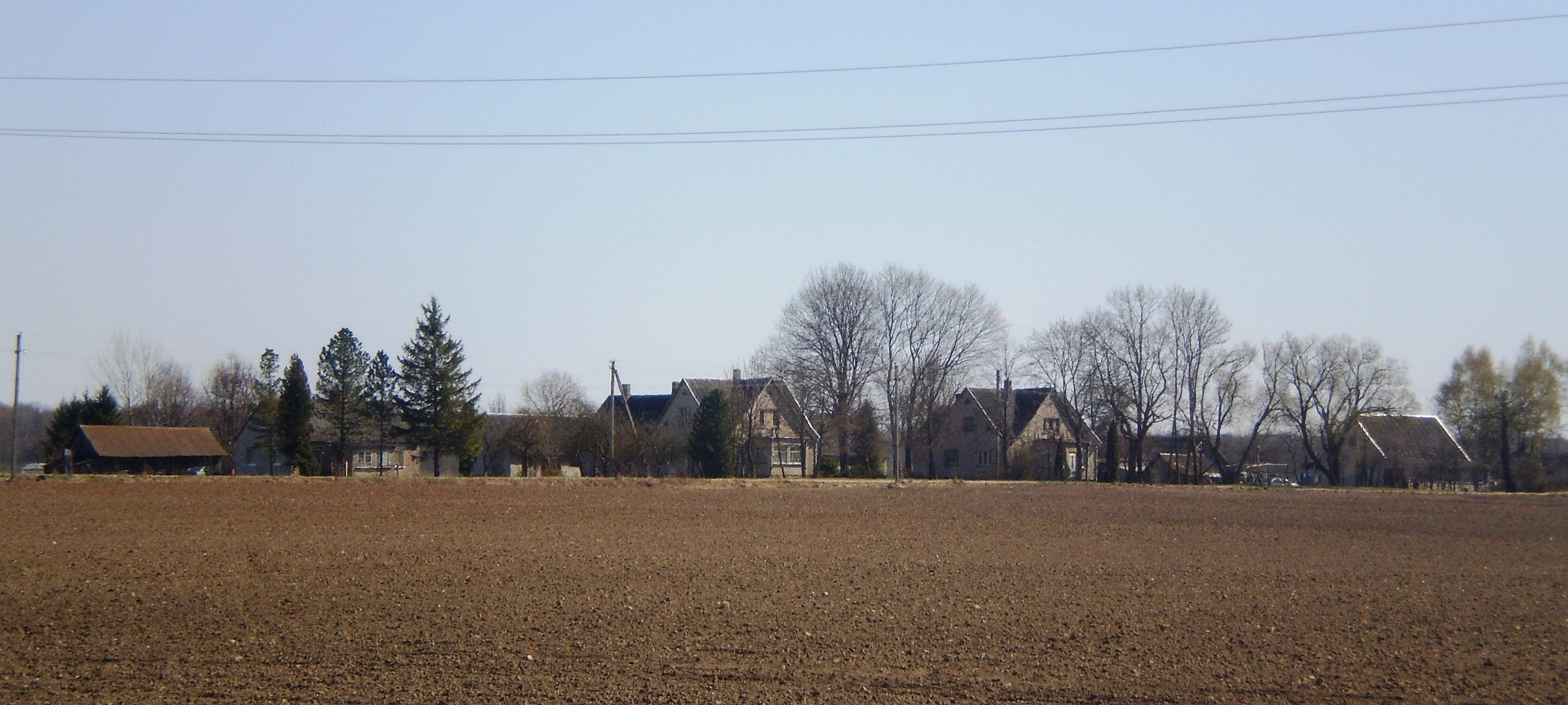

- Location in Lithuania Juciūnai (Lithuania)
- Coordinates: 55°13′08″N 24°07′59″E
- Country: Lithuania
- County: Kaunas County
- Municipality: Kėdainiai district municipality
- Eldership: Pelėdnagiai Eldership

Population (2011)
  - Total: 18
- Time zone: UTC+2 (EET)
  - Summer (DST): UTC+3 (EEST)

Juciūnai (formerly Russian: Юцуны, Polish: Jucuny) is a village in Kėdainiai district municipality, in Kaunas County, in central Lithuania. According to the 2011 census, the village had a population of 18 people. It is located 1 kilometre (0.62 mi) from Beinaičiai, by the Vaiskulis rivulet. There is a wooden chapel (built in 1817) in the cemetery of Juciūnai, also two roofed poles monuments are located in the village.

== History ==
Juciūnai has been known since 1604. In the 19th century there was Juciūnai village and manor (later a folwark; a property of the Kulviečiai family).

== Demography ==
Historical population

Year	Pop.	±% p.a.
1902	82	—
1923	120	+1.83%
1959	117	−0.07%
1970	80	−3.40%
1979	42	−6.91%

Year	Pop.	±% p.a.
1985	41	−0.40%
1989	38	−1.88%
2001	43	+1.04%
2011	18	−8.34%

Source: 1902, 1923, 1959 & 1970, 1979, 1989, 2001, 2011

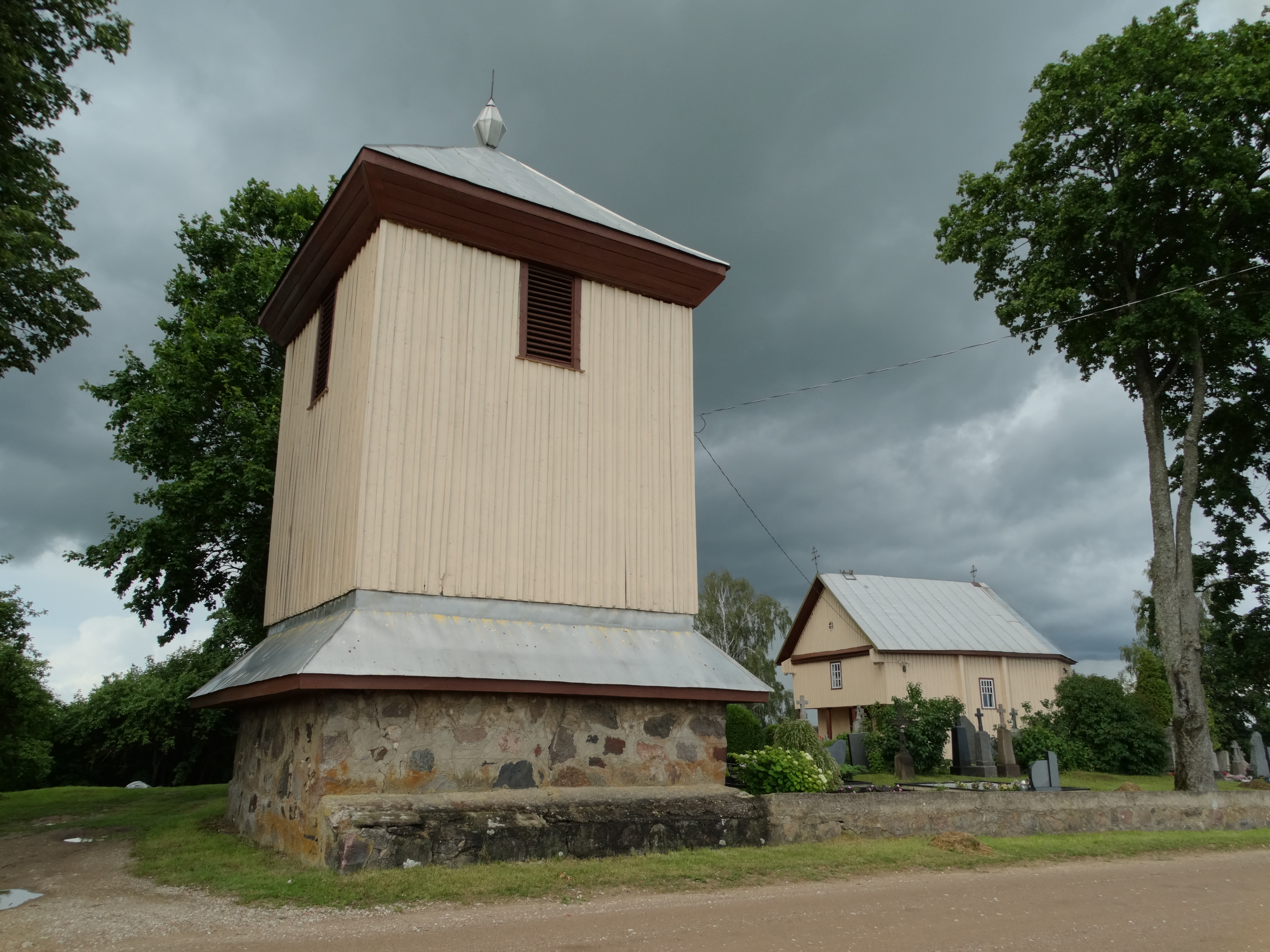
Juciūnai chapel and belltower
