= Kudžioniai =

- Village
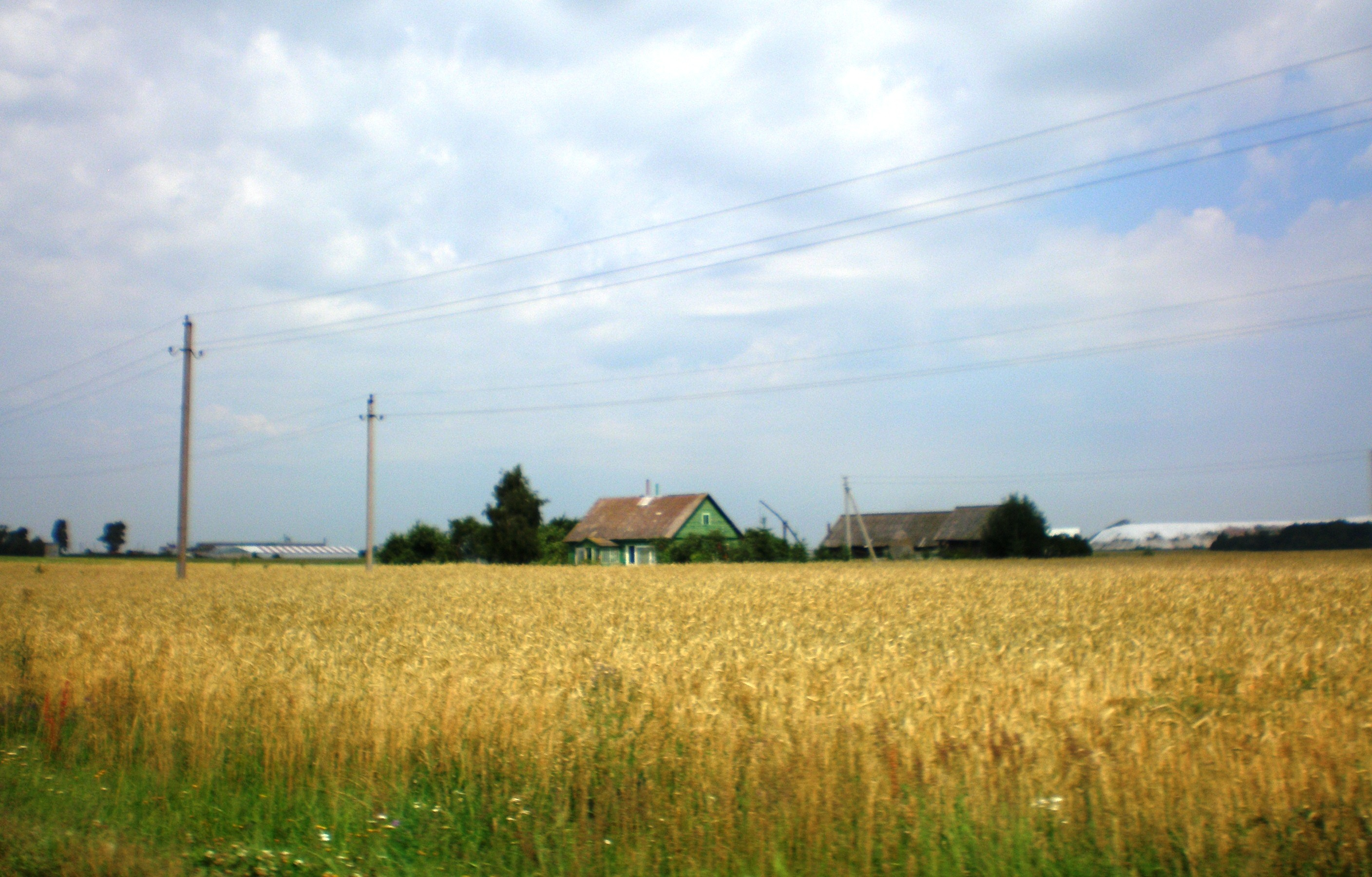

- Location in Lithuania Kudžioniai (Lithuania)
- Coordinates: 55°13′52″N 24°01′08″E
- Country: Lithuania
- County: Kaunas County
- Municipality: Kėdainiai district municipality
- Eldership: Pelėdnagiai Eldership

Population (2011)
  - Total: 1
- Time zone: UTC+2 (EET)
  - Summer (DST): UTC+3 (EEST)

Kudžioniai (formerly Russian: Кудзины, Polish: Kudziany) is a village in Kėdainiai district municipality, in Kaunas County, in central Lithuania. According to the 2011 census, it had a population of 1 person. It is 1 kilometre (0.62 mi) from Nociūnai, by the Šerkšnys river and the Jonava-Šeduva (KK144) road.

== Demography ==
Historical population

Year	Pop.	±% p.a.
1902	126	—
1923	142	+0.57%
1959	121	−0.44%
1970	54	−7.07%

Year	Pop.	±% p.a.
1979	13	−14.63%
1989	4	−11.12%
2001	5	+1.88%
2011	1	−14.87%

Source: 1902, 1923, 1959 & 1970, 1979, 1989, 2001, 2011
