= Pelėdnagiai Eldership =

Pelėdnagiai Eldership Pelėdnagių seniunija
- Eldership
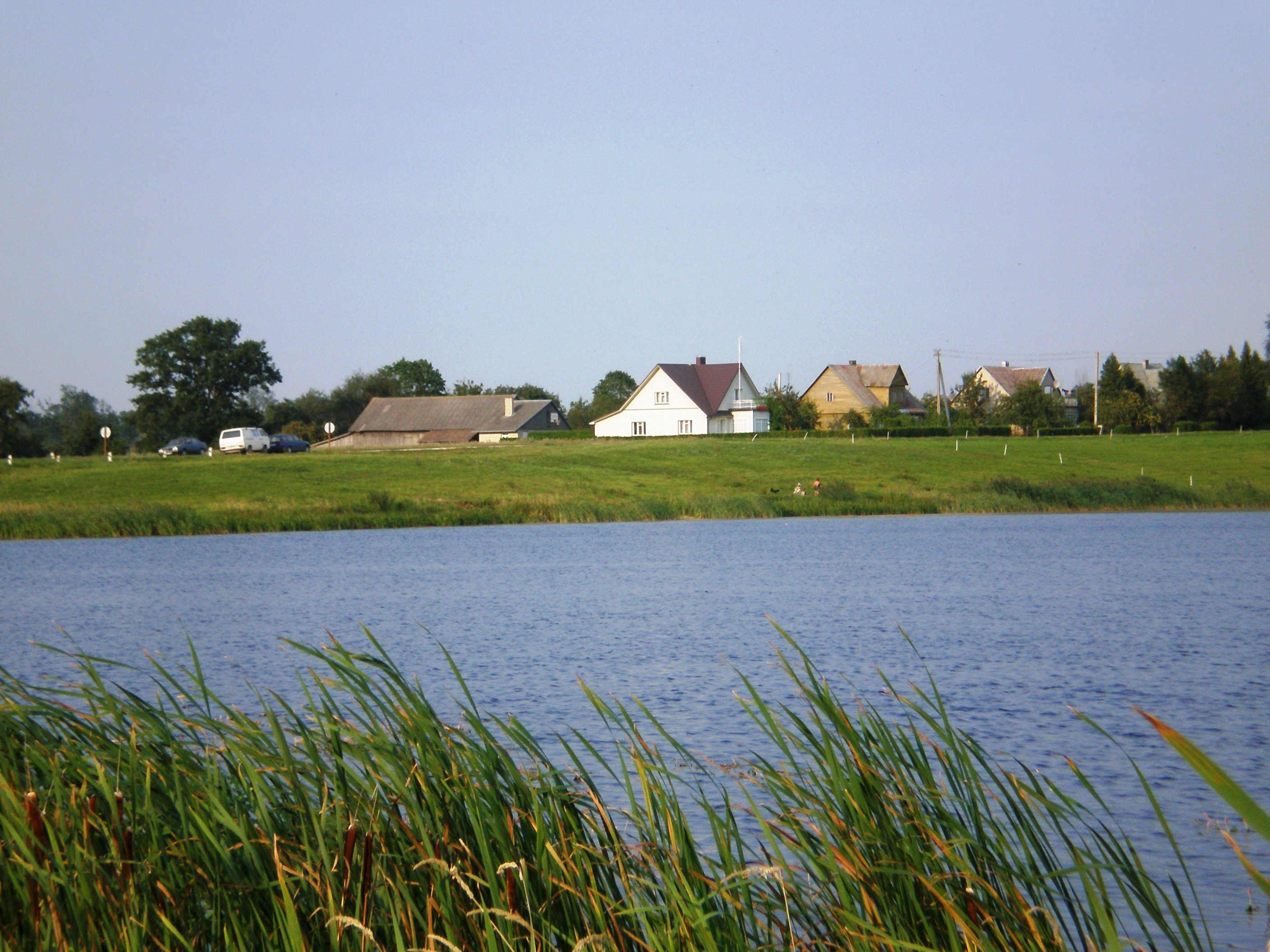
- Pamėkliai village and the Labūnava Reservoir

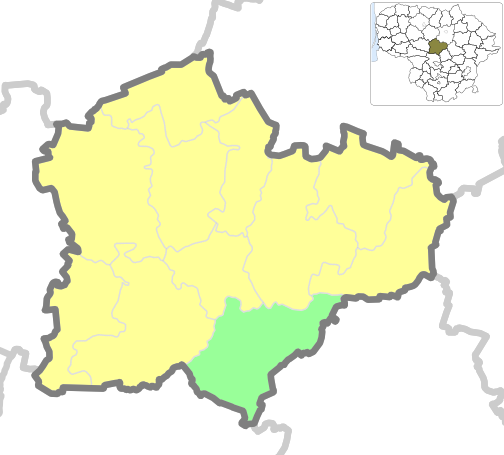
- Location of Pelėdnagiai Eldership
- Country: Lithuania
- Ethnographic region: Aukštaitija
- County: Kaunas County
- Municipality: Kėdainiai District Municipality
- Administrative centre: Pelėdnagiai

Area
  - Total: 141 km^{2} (54 sq mi)

Population (2011)
  - Total: 3,780
  - Density: 26.8/km^{2} (69.4/sq mi)
- Time zone: UTC+2 (EET)
  - Summer (DST): UTC+3 (EEST)

Pelėdnagiai Eldership (Lithuanian: Pelėdnagių seniūnija) is a Lithuanian eldership, located in the south eastern part of Kėdainiai District Municipality.

Eldership was created from the Pelėdnagiai selsovet in 1993.

== Geography ==
The territory of Pelėdnagiai Eldership is located mostly in the Nevėžis Plain and the Nevėžis river valley. Relief is mostly flat, cultivated as agriculture lands. Forests cover about 40 % of the eldership.

- Rivers: Nevėžis, Barupė, Urka, Mėkla, Lankesa, Ašarėna
- Lakes and ponds: Labūnava Reservoir.
- Forests: Labūnava Forest.
- Protected areas: Barupė Hydrographical Sanctuary, Lankesa Botanical Sanctuary, Pelėdnagiai Botanical Sanctuary, Labūnava Forest Biosphere Polygon.

== Places of interest ==
- Catholic church of the Divine in Labūnava
- Juciūnai cemetery chapel
- Aukupėnai cemetery tomb-chapel
- Labūnava manor tower
- Gelnai wayside chapel
- Ancient burial site in Nociūnai and former cemetery site in Pašiliai
- Soviet mosaic the "Land Improvers" in Pelėdnagiai

== Populated places ==
Following settlements are located in the Pelėdnagiai Eldership (as for the 2011 census):

- Villages: Akmeniai · Ansainiai · Aukupėnai · Baldinka · Beinaičiai · Bučiūnai · Eiguliai · Gelnai · Ivaniškiai · Jagminai · Juciūnai · Kačergiai · Kruopiai · Kudžioniai · Labūnava · Liaudiškiai ·Lineliai · Liogailiškiai · Medekšiai · Nartautai · Nociūnai · Pabarupys · Pacūnai · Pamėkliai · Paobelys · Pašiliai · Pėdžiai · Pelėdnagiai · Puzaičiai · Saviečiai · Serbinai · Servitgaliai · Sičioniai · Slikiai · Stašaičiai · Šilainėliai · Šilainiai · Užkapiai · Vainiūnai · Zabieliškis · Žiogaičiai
- Hamlets: Rimuoliai
- Railway station settlements: Slikių GS
- Former settlements: Činkiai
