= Šilainiai, Pelėdnagiai =

Šilainiai
- Village
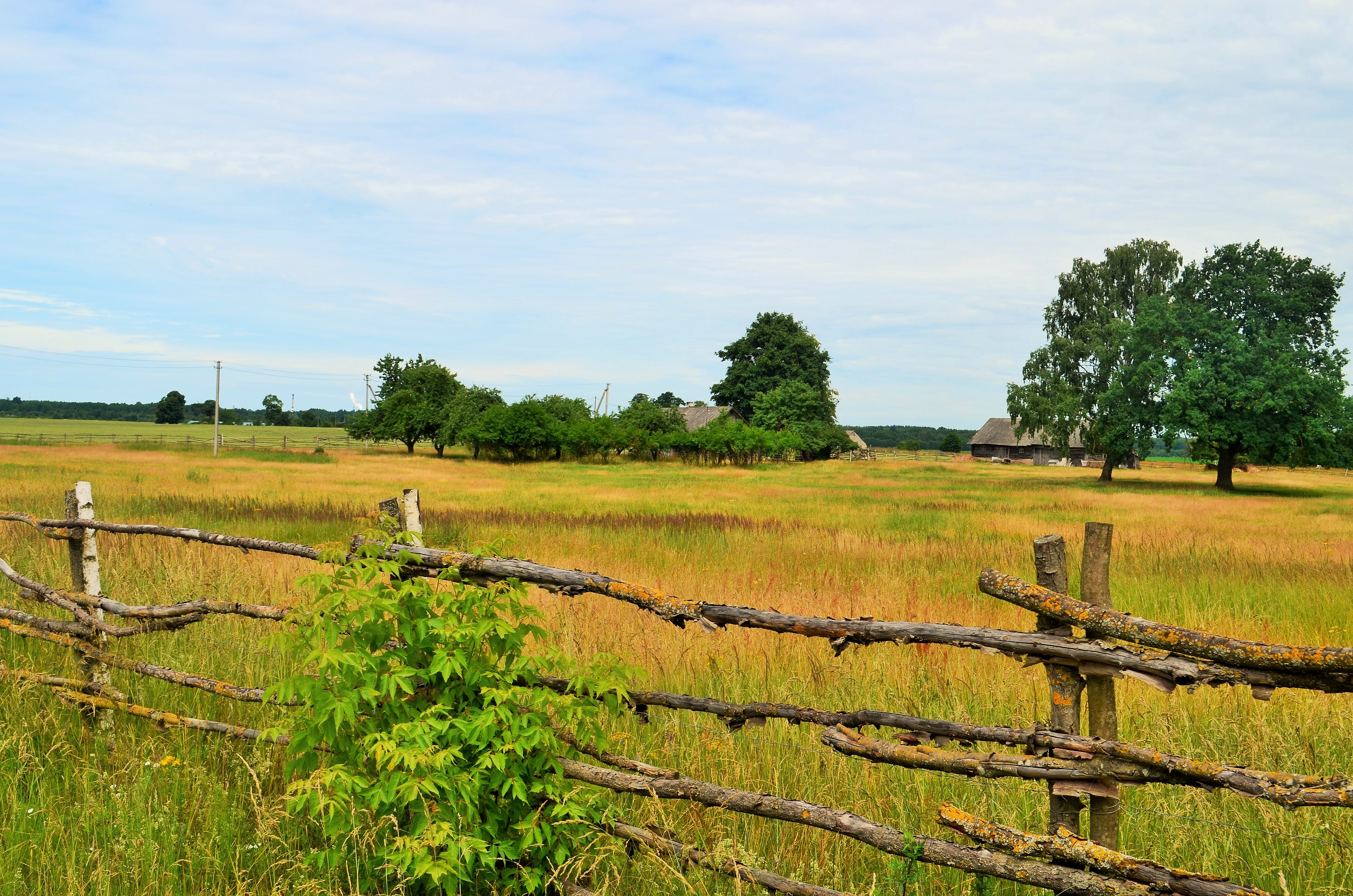

- Location in Lithuania Šilainiai (Lithuania)
- Coordinates: 55°14′31″N 24°04′59″E
- Country: Lithuania
- County: Kaunas County
- Municipality: Kėdainiai district municipality
- Eldership: Pelėdnagiai Eldership

Population (2011)
  - Total: 25
- Time zone: UTC+2 (EET)
  - Summer (DST): UTC+3 (EEST)

Šilainiai (formerly Russian: Шиланы, Polish: Szyłajnie) is a village in Kėdainiai district municipality, in Kaunas County, in central Lithuania. According to the 2011 census, the village had a population of 25 people. It is located 3.5 kilometres (2.2 mi) from Nociūnai, among the A8 highway, the Želksnys, the Raistas, the Bubliai and the Bubleliai forests, the Piltyna and the Gegužinė rivulets. There is a cemetery and a former quarry. The Šilainiai railway station is in Zutkiai village.

== Demography ==
Historical population

Year	Pop.	±% p.a.
1902	250	—
1923	192	−1.25%
1959	175	−0.26%
1970	118	−3.52%

Year	Pop.	±% p.a.
1979	83	−3.83%
1989	48	−5.33%
2001	41	−1.30%
2011	25	−4.83%

Source: 1902, 1923, 1959 & 1970, 1979, 1989, 2001, 2011

== Images ==
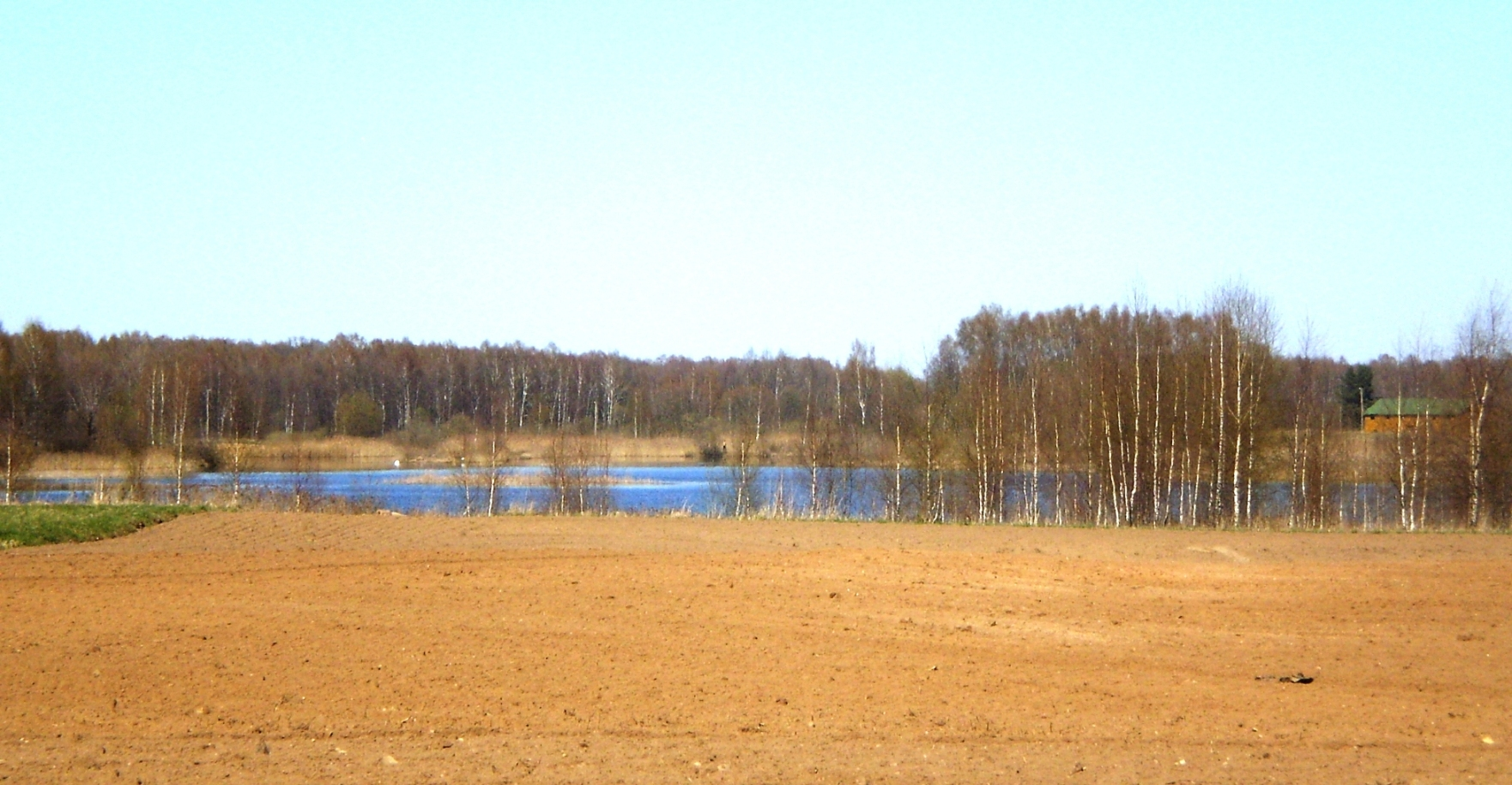
Šilainiai quarry

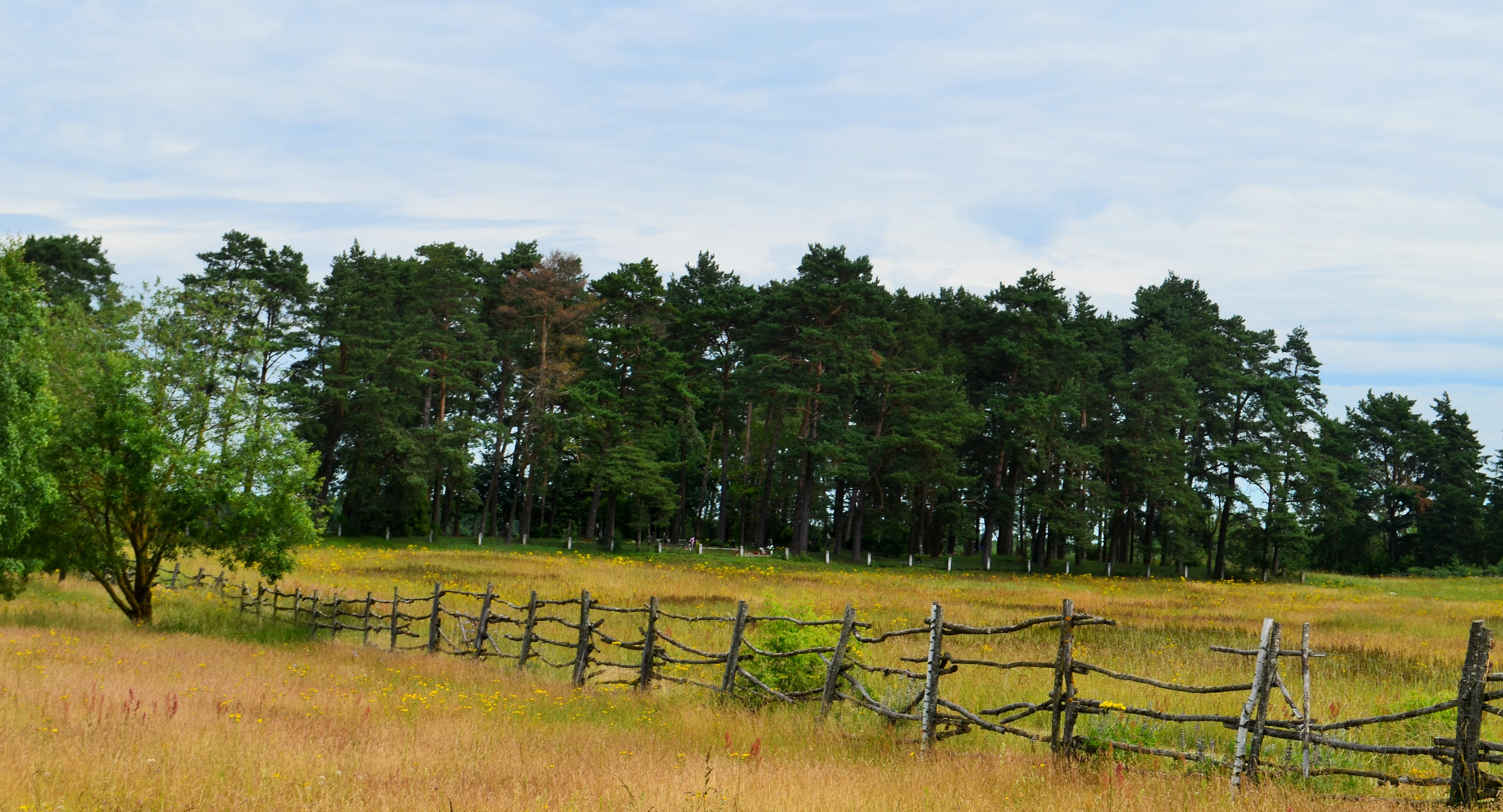
Cemetery

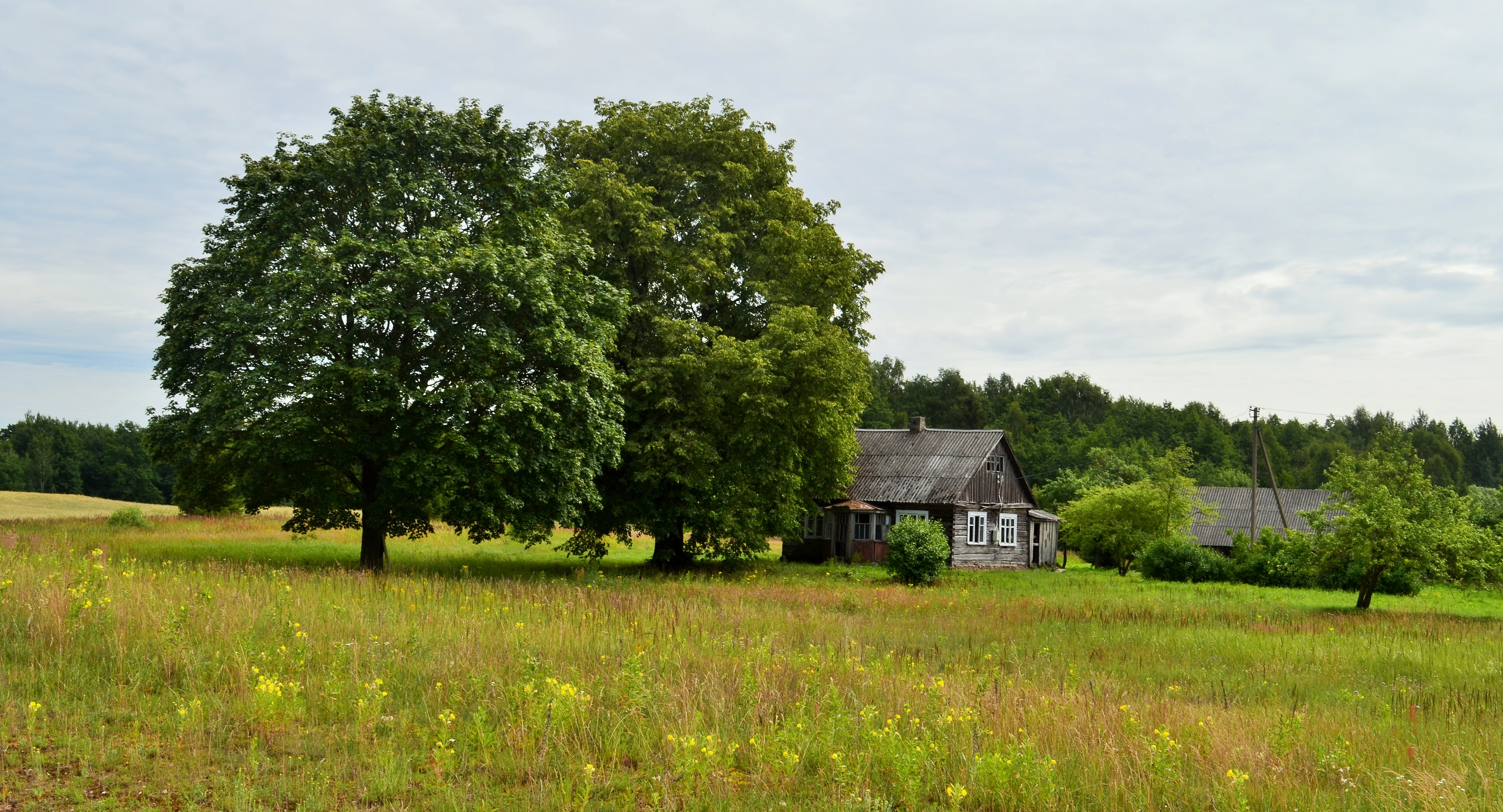
A homestead
