= Kuigaliai =

- Village
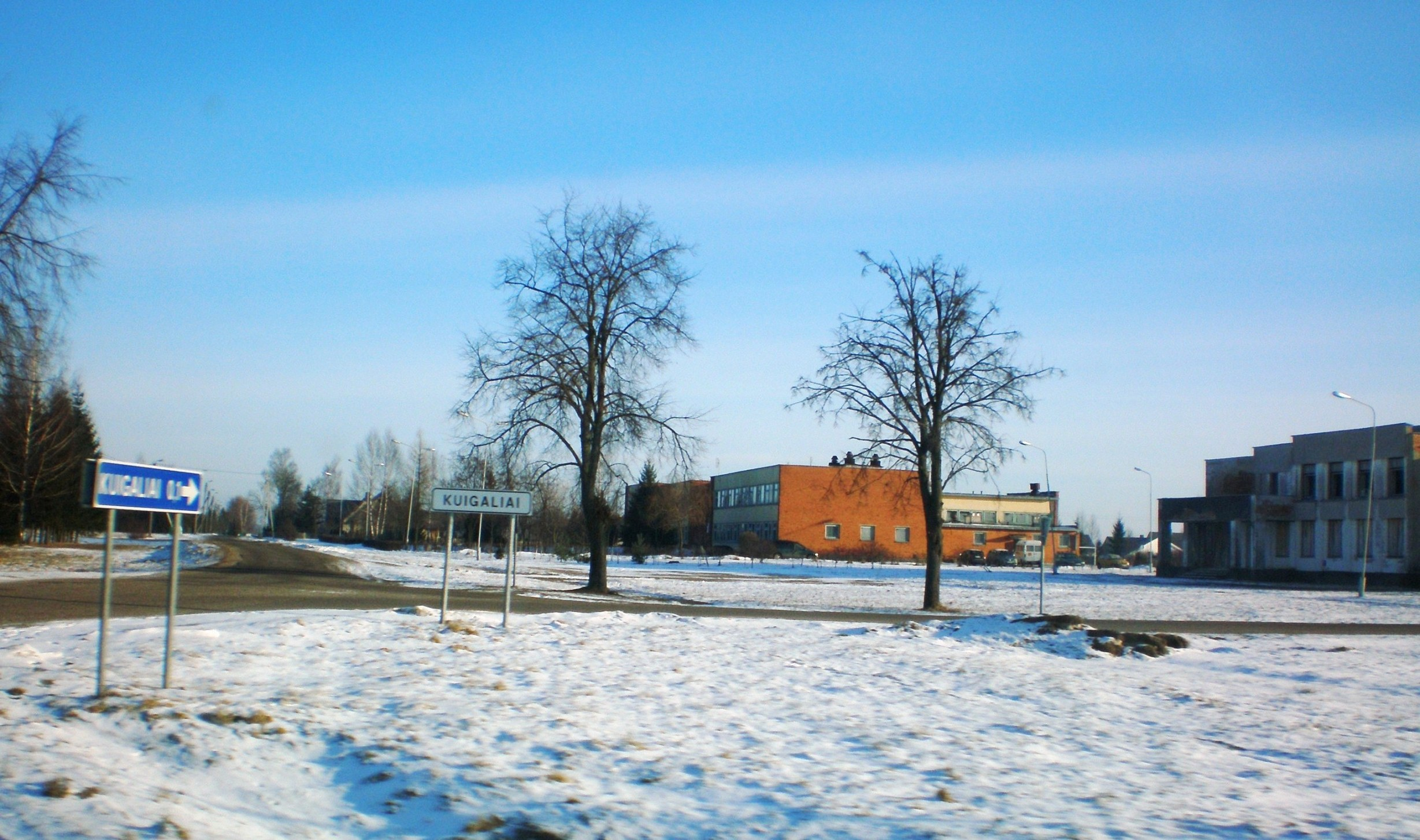
- South entrance into Kuigaliai on Highway 144

- Location within Lithuania
- Coordinates: 55°10′53″N 24°05′50″E
- Country: Lithuania
- County: Kaunas County
- Municipality: Jonava
- Eldership: Žeimiai Eldership

Population (2011)
  - Total: 409
- Time zone: UTC+2 (EET)
  - Summer (DST): UTC+3 (EEST)

Kuigaliai is a village in Jonava district municipality, in Kaunas County, in central Lithuania, located 8 km west of Žeimiai, along Highway 144 (Jonava–Kėdainiai–Šeduva), and about 20 km northwest of Jonava. The Barupė River, a tributary of the Nevėžis, flows through the village, forming the Kuigaliai Pond. Kuigaliai serves as the center of its subdistrict (seniūnaitija).

== History ==
Previously, the village had the Kuigaliai Manor. At the end of the 19th century, Kuigaliai and the manor estate (then owned by the Kognovickis family) were recorded as covering about 390 desiatins of land (4.2 km^{2}).

A primary school was founded in 1923; from 1989 to 1998 it operated as a nine-year school, and since 1994 it was converted into the Barupė Primary School. A school library was established in 1961 to serve the whole village. The school was deregistered in August 2025.

From 1950 to 1992, Kuigaliai served as the central settlement of the Barupė horticultural Soviet state-owned farming (sovkhoz).

In 1961, a library, cultural center, post office, and outpatient clinic were established.

== The village ==
The village has a 0.34 MW straw-fired heating plant and established fruit orchards.

== Demographics ==
According to the 2011 census, the village has a population of 409 people.
