= Juškonys =

- Village
- Location within Lithuania
- Coordinates: 55°14′20″N 24°14′20″E
- Country: Lithuania
- County: Kaunas County
- Municipality: Jonava
- Eldership: Žeimiai Eldership

Population (2011)
  - Total: 385
- Time zone: UTC+2 (EET)
  - Summer (DST): UTC+3 (EEST)

Juškonys is a village in Jonava district municipality, in Kaunas County, in central Lithuania. It is located along the KK232 road (Vilijampolė–Žeimiai–Šėta), 7 km north of Žeimiai and 5 km from Šėta. It serves as the center of a seniūnaitija (sub-eldership). The village has a public library.

== History ==
Southeast of the village lies the Normainiai Hillfort (Normainių piliakalnis).

In the winter of 1922, an elementary school began operating in the cottage of J. Petrusevičius (Atkočius). In 1924, it moved to a larger building owned by Jonas Petrauskas (nicknamed "Bitininkas," meaning "the Beekeeper"). Between 1925 and 1929, the school’s register listed an average of 40–50 pupils. The school was closed around 1970.

In 1989, the elementary school was reopened. In September 2005, the Juškonys Primary School of Jonava District was officially deregistered as a separate institution. Since 2007, it has functioned as a Juškonys branch of Jonava Primary School.

From 1950 to 1992, Juškonys was the central settlement of a collective farm (kolkhoz). During that period, a library, post office, and cultural center were established.

== Demographics ==
According to the 2011 census, the village has a population of 385 people.
