= Urka =

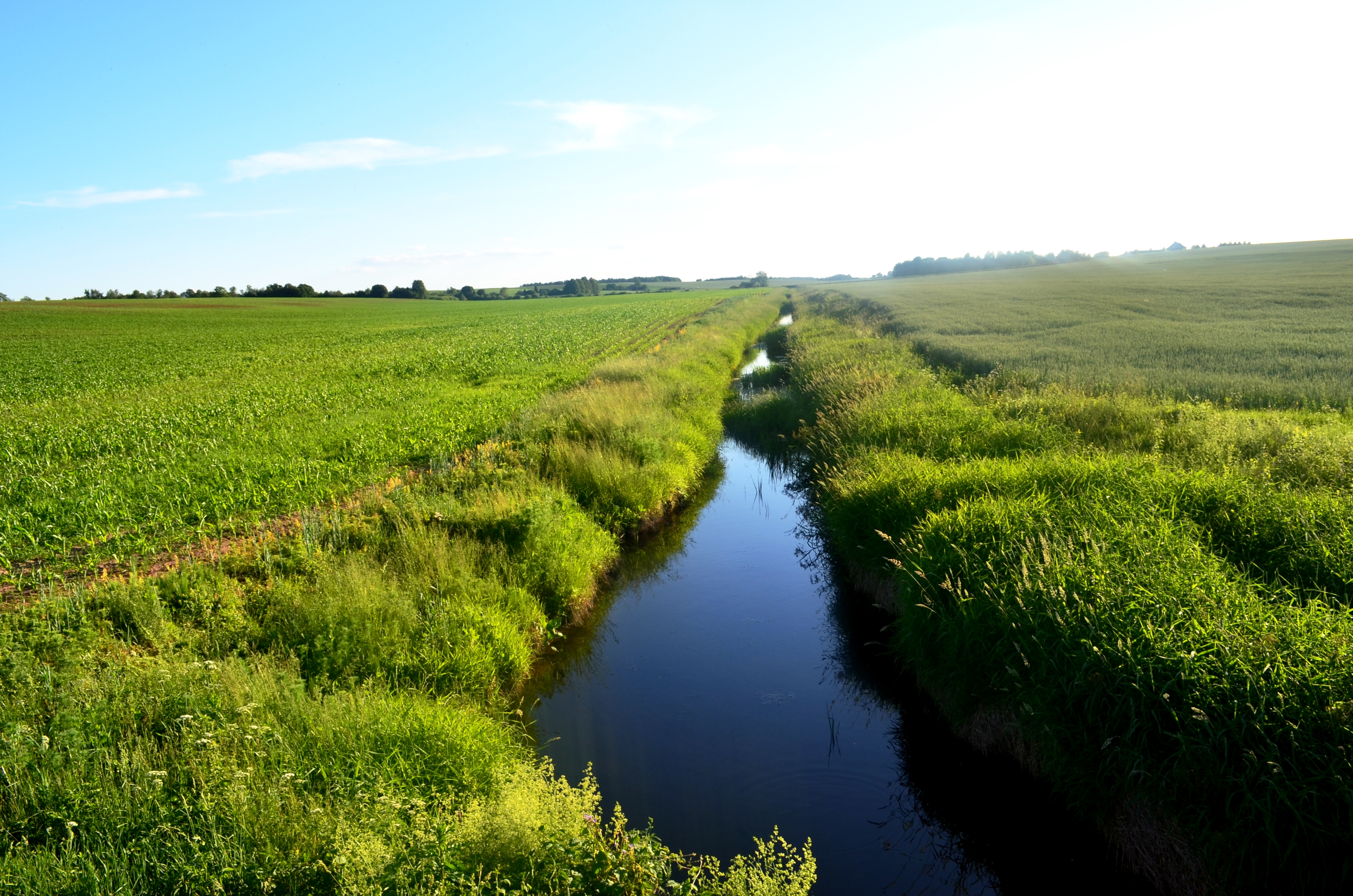
- The lower course of the Urka in Labūnava surroundings

Location
- Country: Lithuania
- Region: Kaunas County

Physical characteristics
- Source
  - location: Bitvanas Forest, Kaunas District Municipality
- Mouth: Barupė in Labūnava
  - coordinates: 55.1846°N 23.8936°E
- Length: 22.2 km (13.8 mi)
- Basin size: 76.9 km^{2} (29.7 sq mi)
- Discharge
  - average: 0.39 m³/s

Basin features
- Progression: Barupė→ Nevėžis→ Neman→ Baltic Sea
- Tributaries
  - left: Taurupė, Tiltinis, Vinkšnupys
  - right: Statupis

The Urka is a river of Kaunas County, central Lithuania. It flows for 22 kilometres (14 mi) and has a basin area of 77 square kilometres (30 sq mi). It is a left tributary of the Barupė.

The Urka river starts in the Bitvanas Forest, in Kaunas District Municipality. It flows towards north western direction through Kaunas District Municipality and Kėdainiai District Municipality, then empties into the Barupė river next to Labūnava village.

Karaliūnai, Butkūnai, Užumiškiai, Kačergiai, Pakapiai, Labūnava villages and Vandžiogala town are located on the shores of the Urka. A small pond is dammed on the Urka nearby its mouth.

The hydronym is of uncertain origin. One version is that it derives from Lithuanian verb urkioti ('to scold, to wig'), another version that it could be of Finno-Ugric background (as Estonian: urg 'rivulet').
