= Labūnava Forest =

Forest in Lithuania

Labūnava Forest Lithuanian: Labūnavos miškai
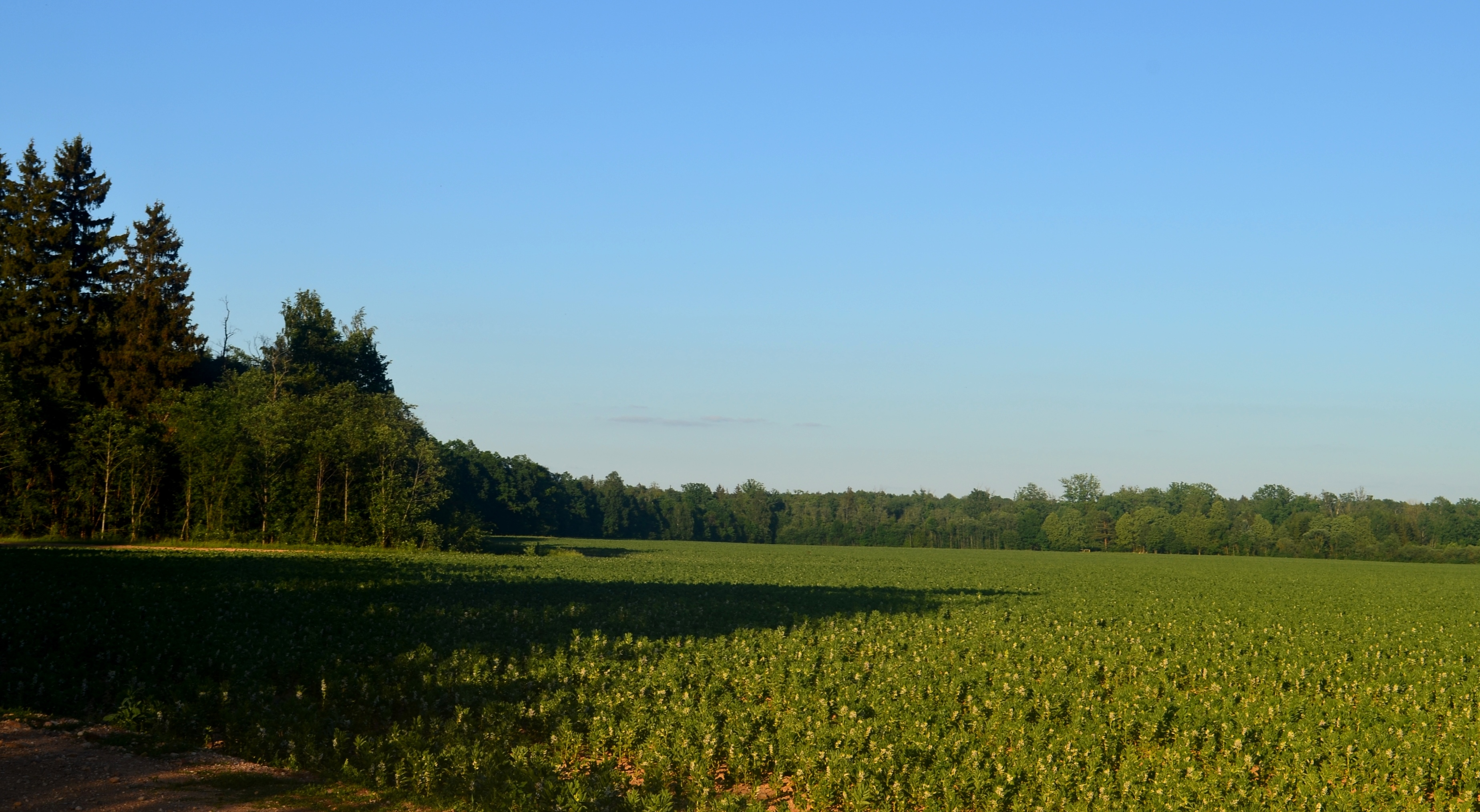
- Labūnava Forest in Sičioniai village surroundings

- Location within Lithuania

Geography
- Location: Kėdainiai District Municipality, Lithuania
- Coordinates: 55.150°N 23.933°E
- Area: 14.2 km^{2} (5.5 sq mi)

Ecology
- Forest cover: birch, spruce, aspen, ash
- Fauna: wild boar, roe deer, red fox, moose, hare

The Labūnava Forest (Lithuanian: Labūnavos miškai) is a forest in Kėdainiai District Municipality, central Lithuania, located 4 kilometres (2.5 mi) south-east from Labūnava. It covers an area of 1,420 hectares (3,500 acres). It consists of smaller forests: the Labūnava Forest (proper), the Kruopiai Forest, the Servydgalis Forest. Most of the forest belongs to the Barupė basin.

As of the 1980s, 31% of the area was covered by birch, 30% by spruce, 13% by aspen, 15% by ash, and 11% by the oak, black alder and white alder tree groups. The fauna of the forest consists of wild boar, roe deer, red deer, moose, red fox, hare. It is also home to black storks, cranes, black kites, perns, white-backed woodpeckers, middle spotted woodpeckers, and lesser spotted eagles. The forest is a part of the Labūnava Biosphere Polygon.
