= Pėdžiai =

- Village
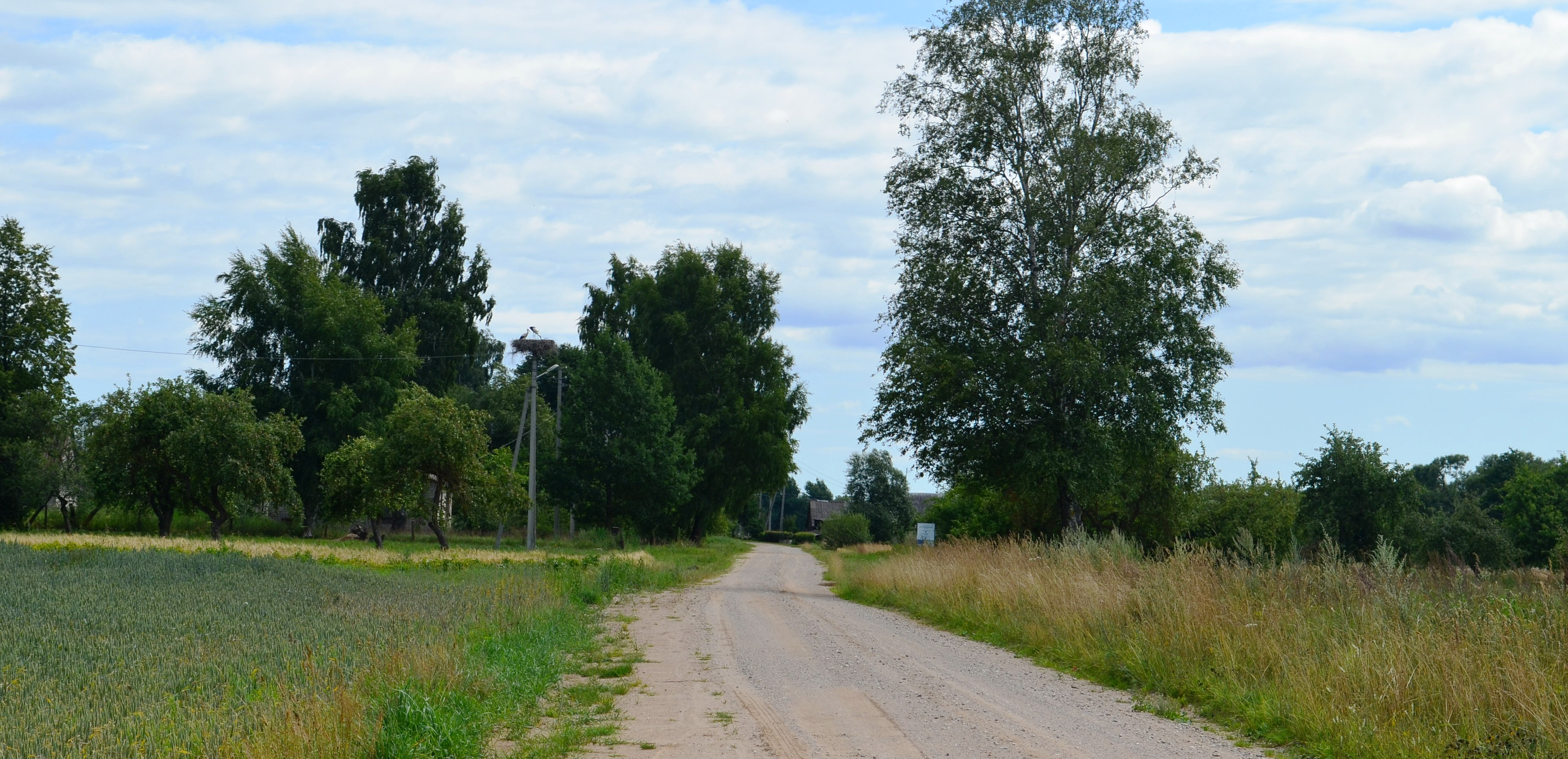
- Pedžiai from the east side of Nociūnai.

- Location in Lithuania Pėdžiai (Lithuania)
- Coordinates: 55°11′49″N 24°02′31″E
- Country: Lithuania
- County: Kaunas County
- Municipality: Kėdainiai district municipality
- Eldership: Pelėdnagiai Eldership

Population (2011)
  - Total: 80
- Time zone: UTC+2 (EET)
  - Summer (DST): UTC+3 (EEST)

Pėdžiai (formerly Russian: Пядзи, romanized: Pyadzi, Polish: Piadzie) is a village in Pelėdnagiai Eldership, Kėdainiai district municipality, in Kaunas County, in central Lithuania. According to the 2011 census, the village had a population of 80 people. It is located 2 kilometres (1.2 mi) from Nociūnai, by the Barupė river, between the roads "Jonava–Šeduva" (KK144) and A8. It covers an area of approximately 0.184 km².

There is a cemetery to the south-west of the village, known as Pelėdnagių kapinės (also referred to as Pėdžių kaimo kapinės), and a pond which is used by locals for fishing and swimming.

It is well known for its rural life, with some residents pursuing cattle farming, as it is well secluded from other towns or cities. Most people access the village through its neighbouring town Nociūnai. The village hosts the heavy music festival "Suvirintojai", including heavy rock and thrash metal, which attracts visitors from the surrounding region.

== History ==
Pėdžiai (as Pedins) has been mentioned the first time by Hermann von Wartberge in 1372, when the village was raided by the Teutonic Order. Later, it was mentioned in Die Littauischen Wegeberichte.

At the beginning of the 20th century Pedžiai was an okolica (a property of the Noreikiai, Abakevičiai, Paulavičiai, Rimavičiai, and Jurevičiai families).

A part of Pėdžiai village was in Jonava District Municipality (Pėdžiai, Jonava).

== Demography ==
The village's population has been decreasing since 1975, with a large portion of the area's population being elderly individuals.

Historical population

Year	Pop.	±% p.a.
1902	372	—
1923	279	−1.36%
1959	299	+0.19%
1970	226	−2.51%

Year	Pop.	±% p.a.
1979	167	−3.31%
1989	107	−4.35%
2001	106	−0.08%
2011	80	−2.77%

Source: 1902, 1923, 1959 & 1970, 1979, 1989, 2001, 2011

== Images ==
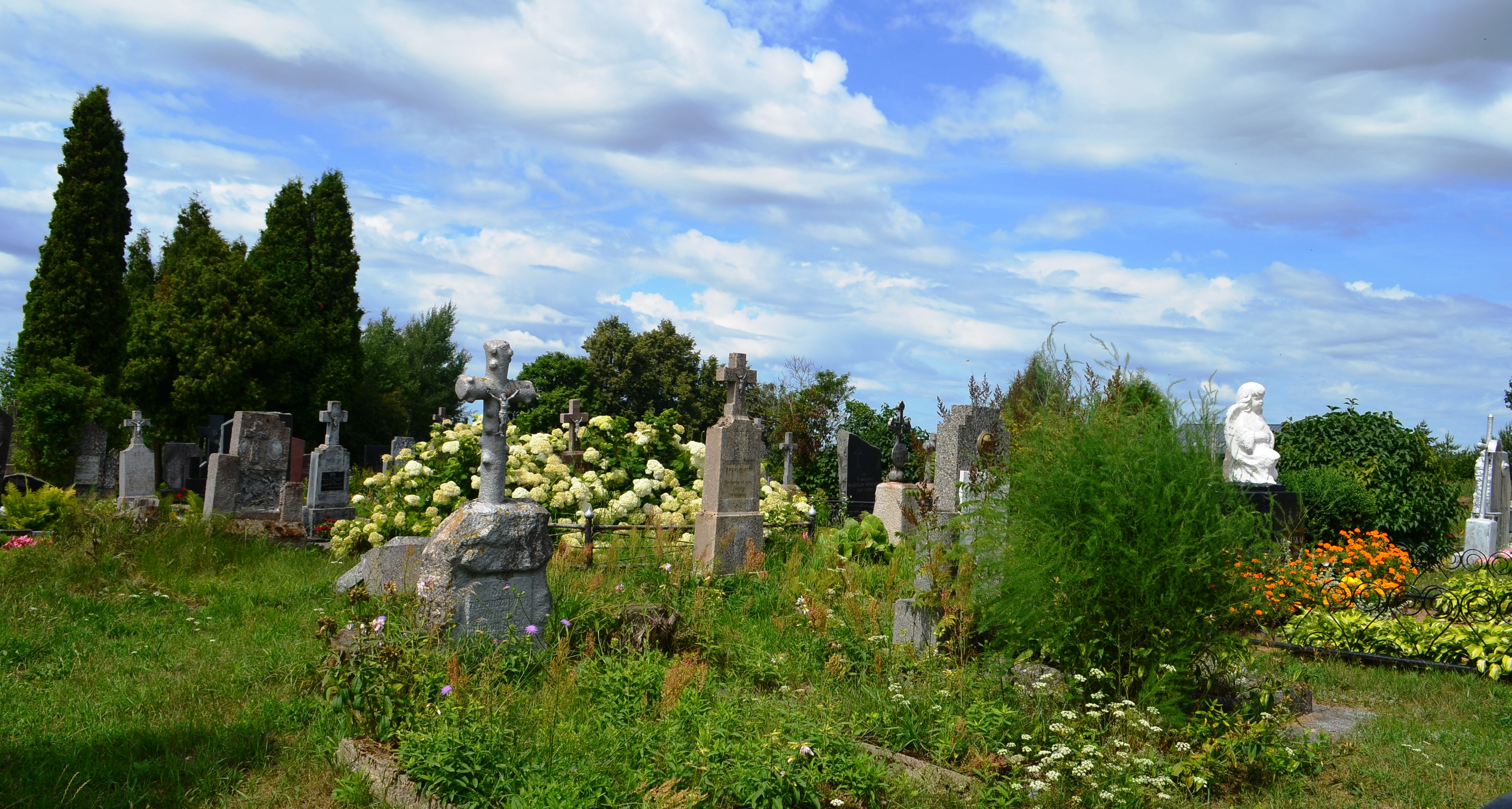
Pėdžiai cemetery

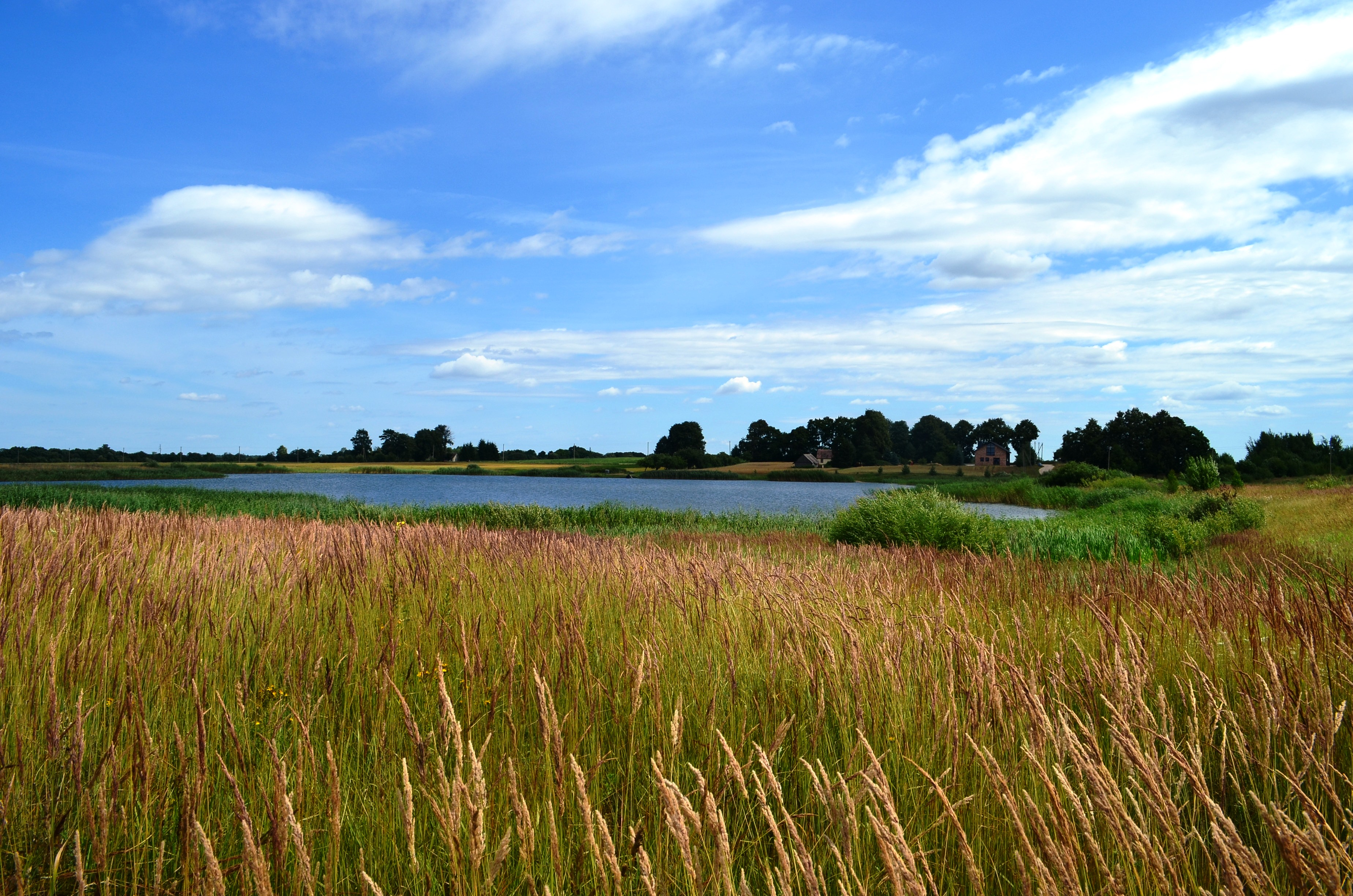
A pond in the village

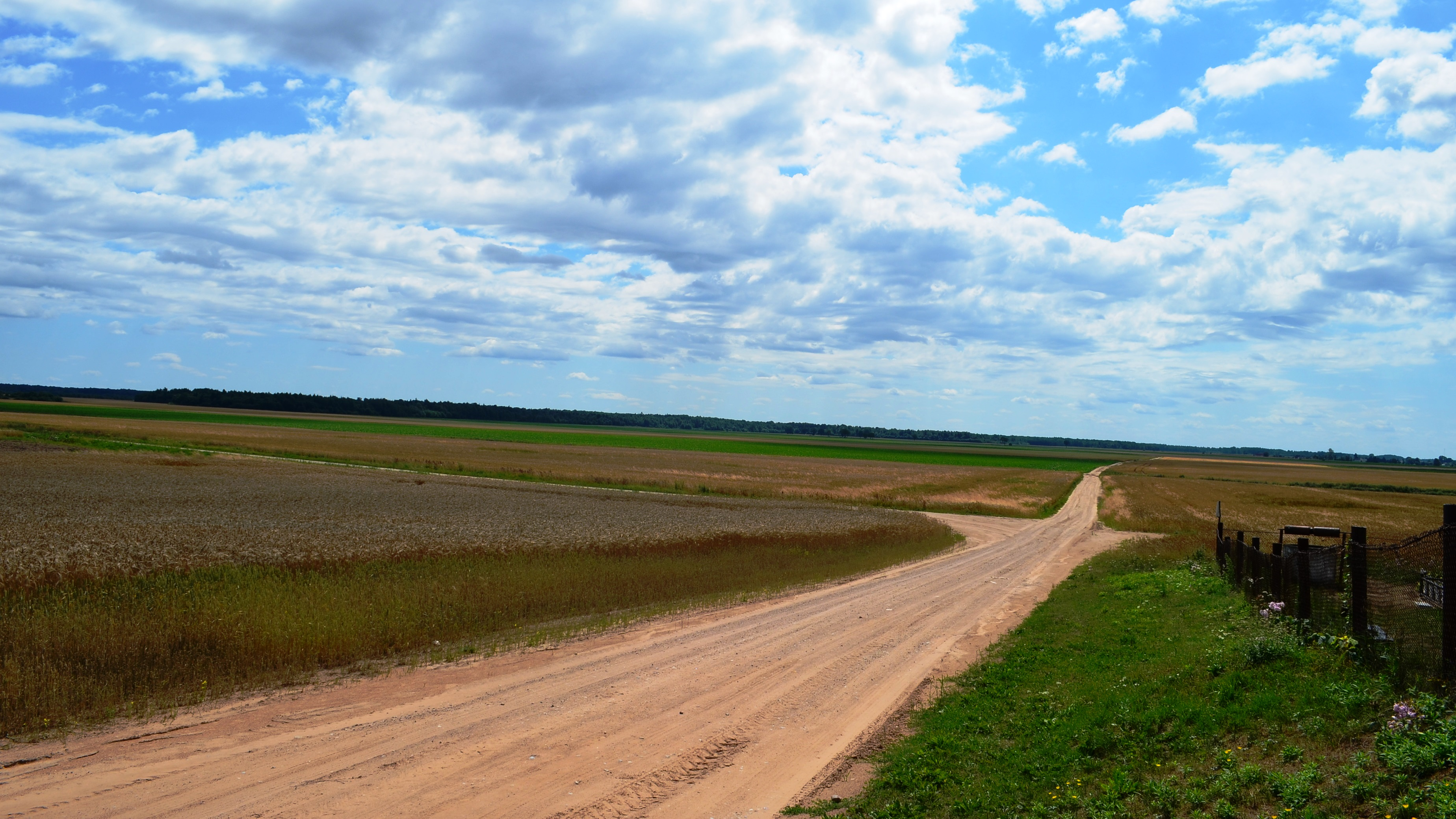
Pėdžiai surroundings
