= Labūnava Reservoir =

Reservoir in Lithuania

- Labūnavos tvenkinys (Lithuanian)
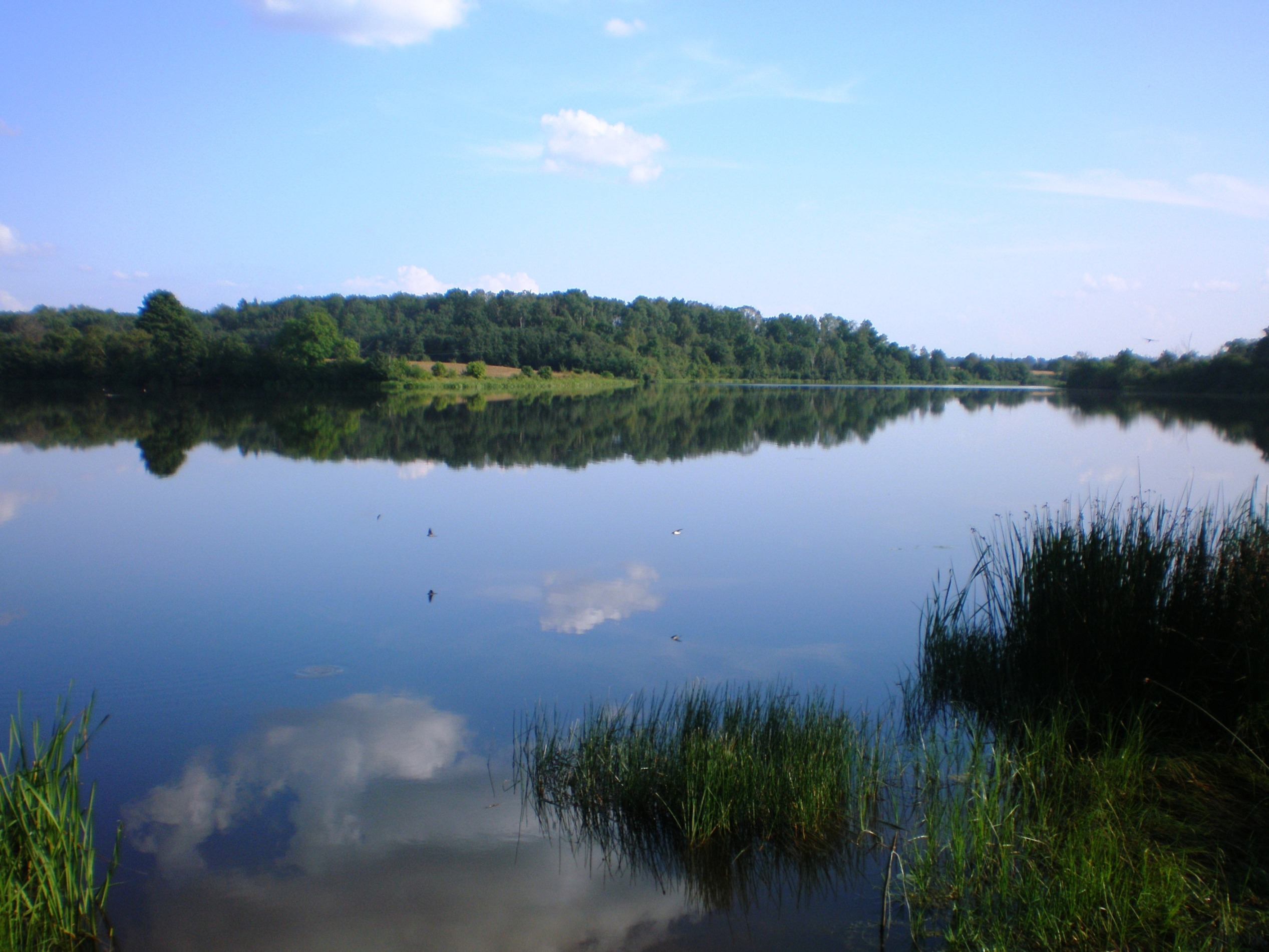
- Labūnava Reservoir next to Ansainiai

- Location within Lithuania Location within Kėdainiai District Municipality
- Location: Kėdainiai District Municipality, Lithuania
- Coordinates: 55°11′08″N 23°55′50″E
- Part of: Barupė→Nevėžis→ Neman→ Baltic Sea
- Primary inflows: Barupė, Mėkla, Liepupė, Karklytė
- Primary outflows: Barupė
- First flooded: 1977
- Max. length: 5.5 km (3.4 mi)
- Max. width: 0.3 km (0.19 mi)
- Surface area: 1.099 km^{2} (0.424 sq mi)
- Average depth: 3.8 m (12 ft)
- Max. depth: 10.0 m (32.8 ft)
- Water volume: 0.00412 km^{3} (0.00099 cu mi)
- Shore length^{1}: 22 km (14 mi)
- Surface elevation: 40 m (130 ft)
- Settlements: Ansainiai, Serbinai, Pamėkliai, Sičioniai, Labūnava
- ^{1} Shore length is not a well-defined measure.

The Labūnava Reservoir is an artificial lake in Kėdainiai District Municipality, in central Lithuania. It is located 11 kilometres (6.8 mi) south from Kėdainiai, next to Labūnava village. It was created in 1977, when a dam on the Barupė river was built next to Labūnava village. In 2003, the dam was reconstructed and a small hydroelectric plant (of 160 kW) built.

The banks of the reservoir are curvy, often overgrown by reed beds. The reservoir is mostly surrounded by agriculture lands, but a small section of the Labūnava Forest is located nearby. The reservoir water is used for irrigation.

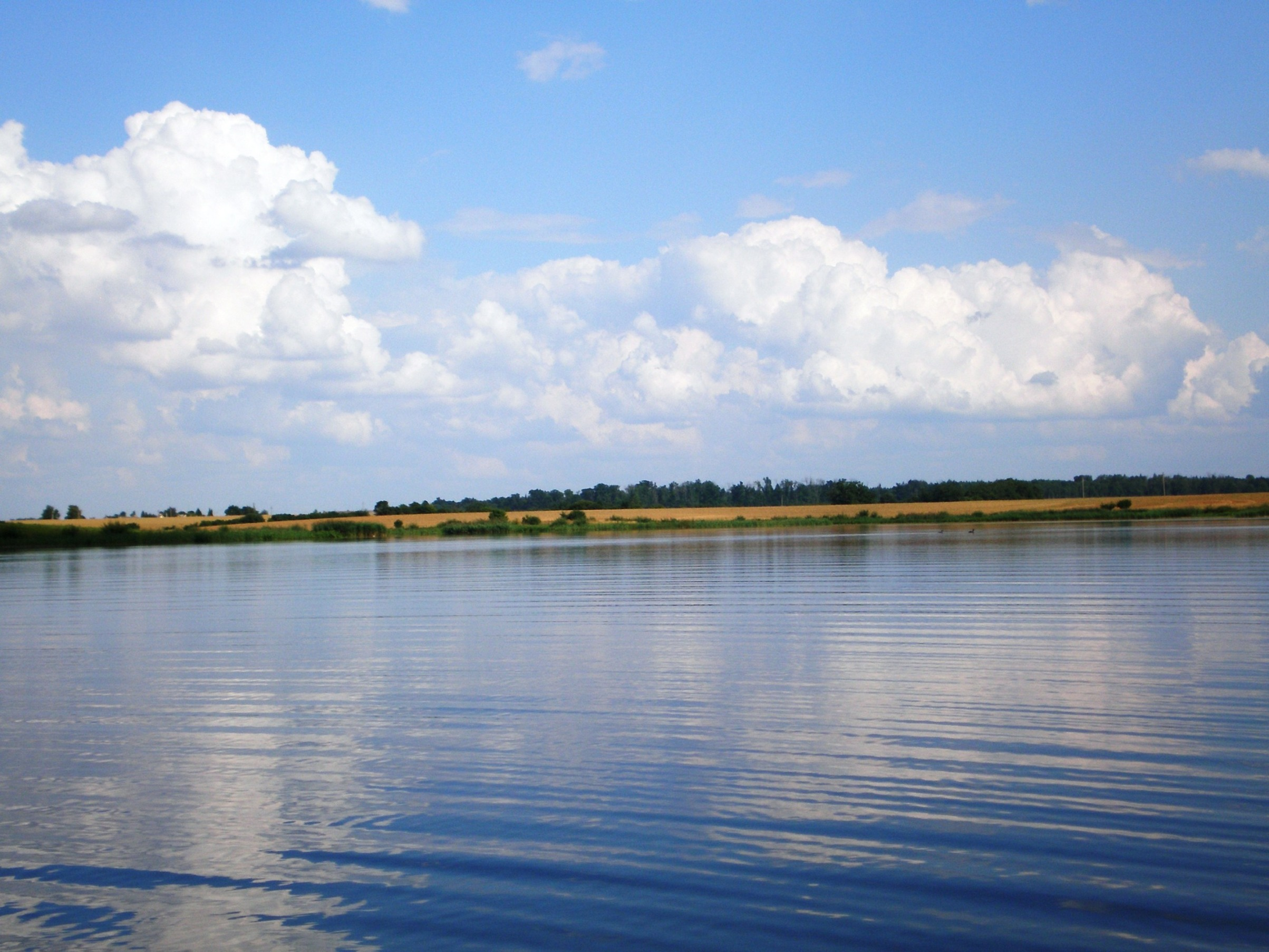
View of the Labūnava Reservoir next to Pamėkliai
