= Slikių Geležinkelio Stotis =

- Village
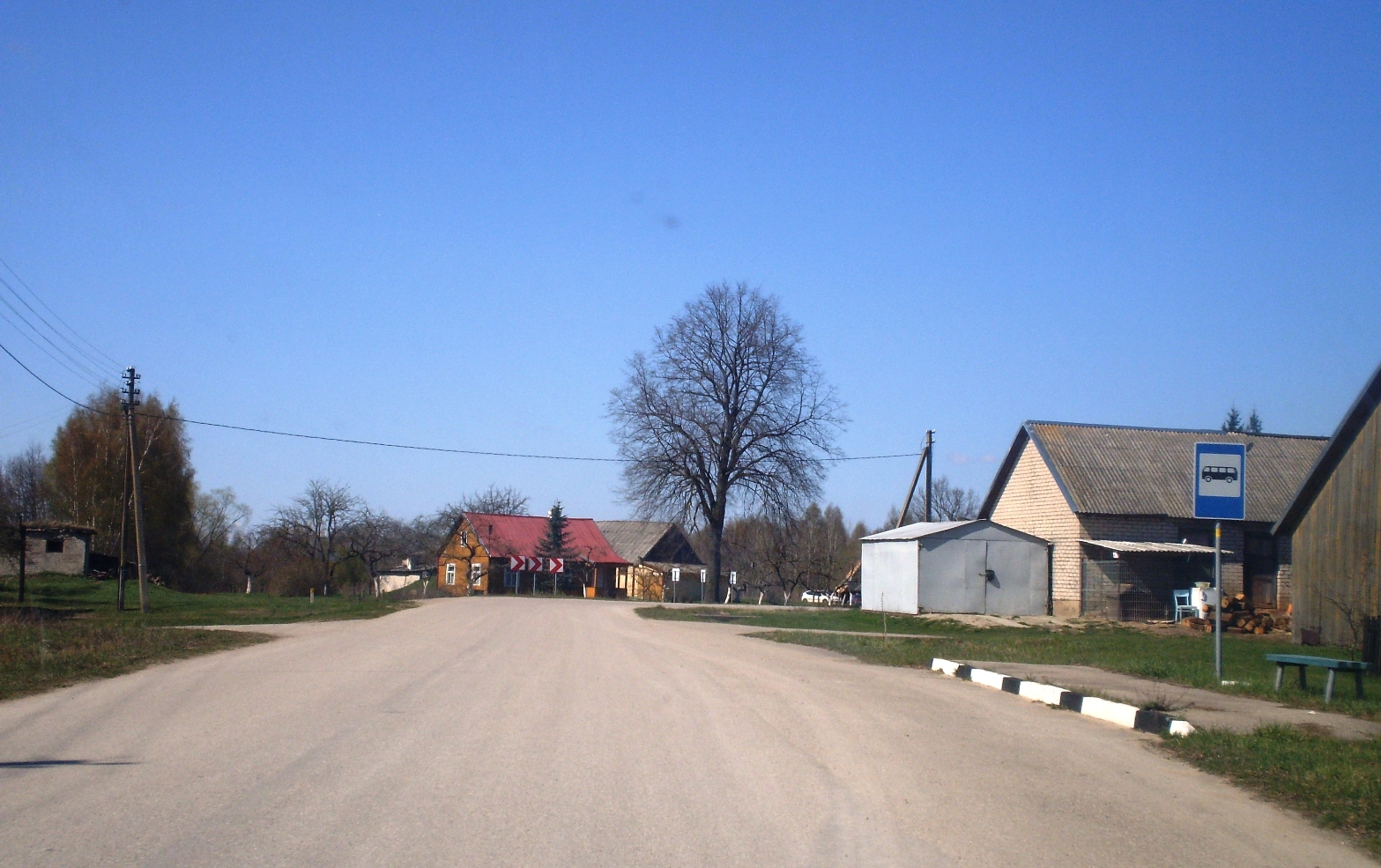

- Location in Lithuania Slikių Geležinkelio Stotis (Lithuania)
- Coordinates: 55°13′17″N 24°05′05″E
- Country: Lithuania
- County: Kaunas County
- Municipality: Kėdainiai district municipality
- Eldership: Pelėdnagiai Eldership

Population (2001)
  - Total: 18
- Time zone: UTC+2 (EET)
  - Summer (DST): UTC+3 (EEST)

Slikių Geležinkelio Stotis ('Slikiai railway station') is a railway station settlement in Kėdainiai district municipality, in Kaunas County, in central Lithuania. According to the 2001 census, the settlement had a population of 18 people. It is located 3 kilometres (1.9 mi) from Nociūnai, by the Raistas Forest. There is the Lukšiai railway station by the Vilnius-Šiauliai-Klaipėda line.

== Demography ==
Historical population

Year	Pop.	±% p.a.
1923	14	—
1959	36	+2.66%
1970	65	+5.52%

Year	Pop.	±% p.a.
1989	22	−5.54%
2001	18	−1.66%

Source: 1902, 1923, 1959 & 1970, 1979, 1989, 2001, 2011

== Images ==
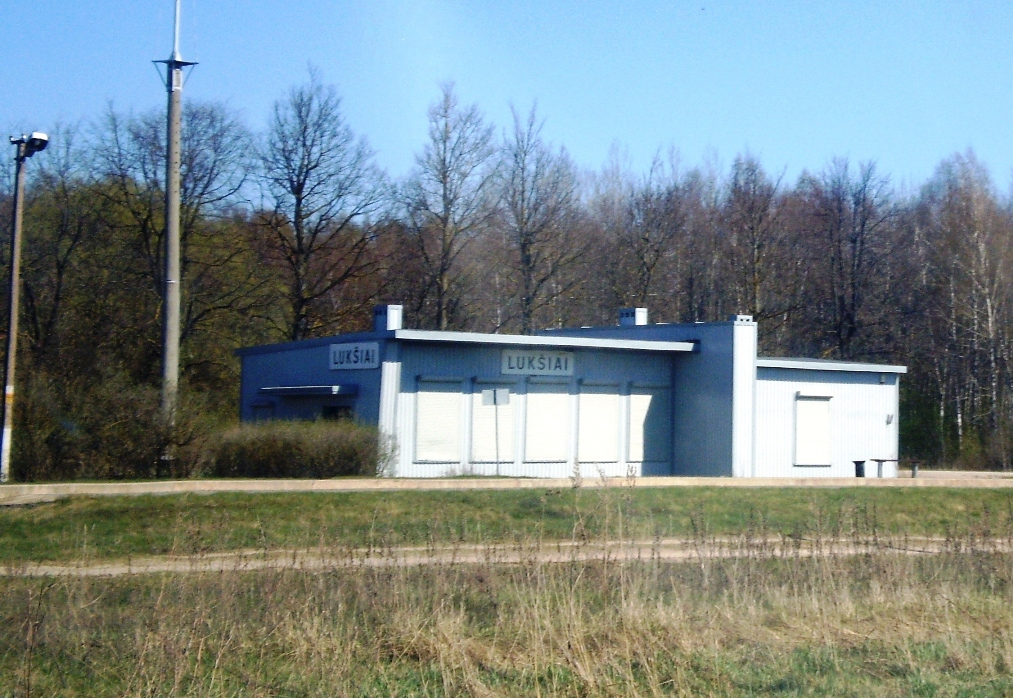
Lukšiai station

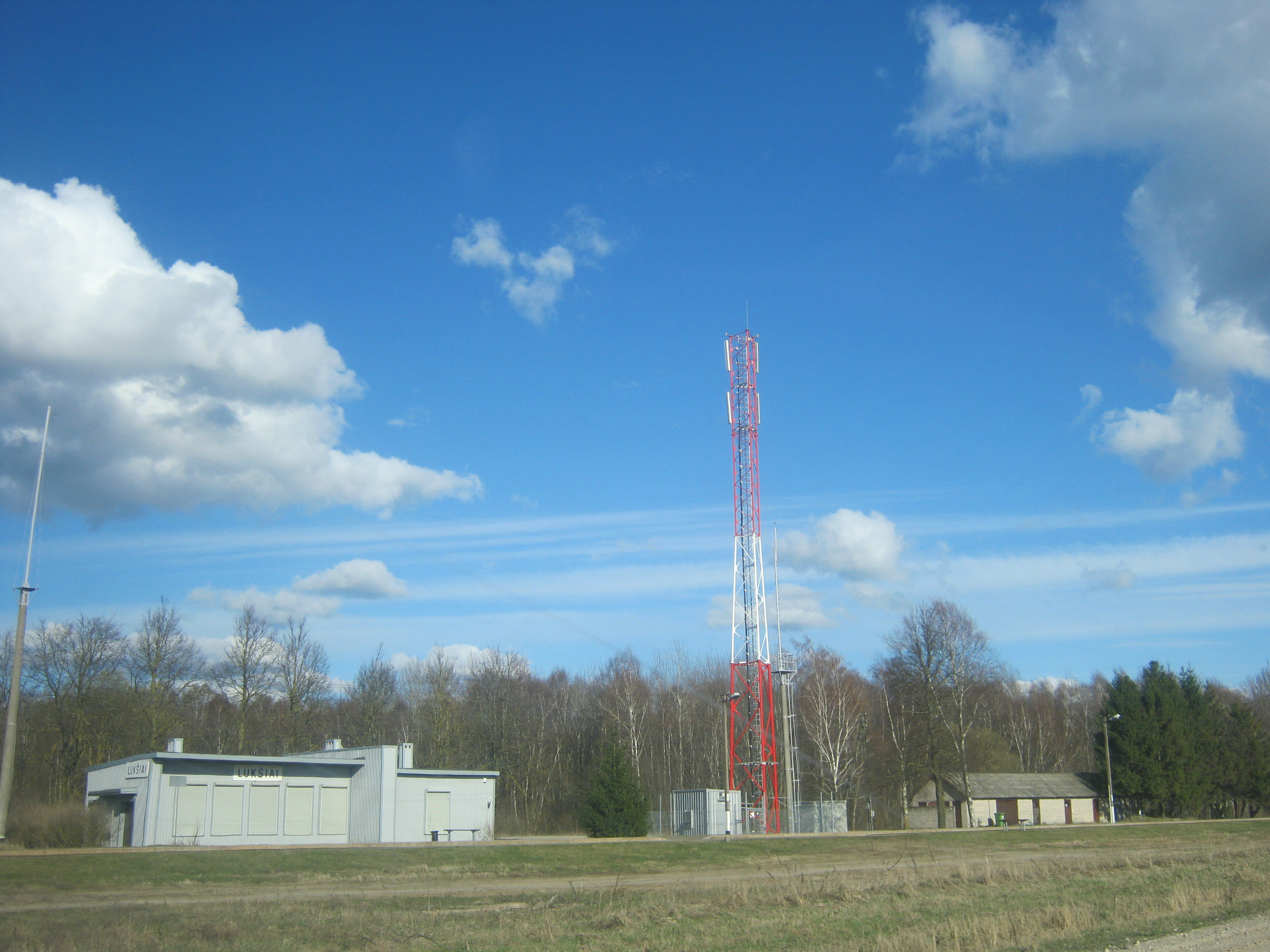
Lukšiai station

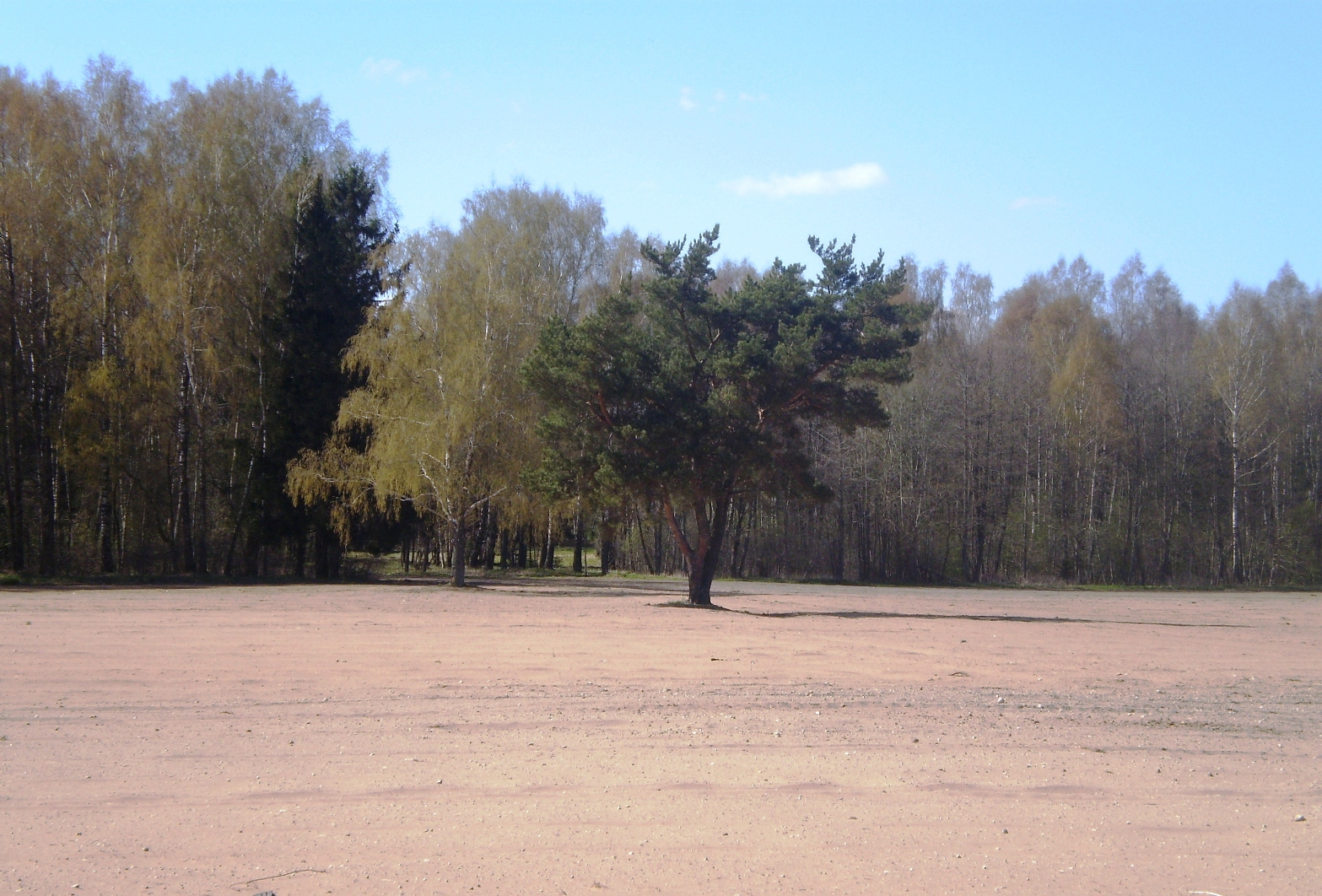
Slikiai GS surroundings
