= Pabarupys =

- Village
- Location in Lithuania Pabarupys (Lithuania)
- Coordinates: 55°12′45″N 23°58′49″E
- Country: Lithuania
- County: Kaunas County
- Municipality: Kėdainiai district municipality
- Eldership: Pelėdnagiai Eldership

Population (2011)
  - Total: 0
- Time zone: UTC+2 (EET)
  - Summer (DST): UTC+3 (EEST)

Pabarupys (formerly Russian: Подборупе, Polish: Podborupie) is a village in Kėdainiai district municipality, in Kaunas County, in central Lithuania. According to the 2011 census, the village was uninhabited. It is located 5 kilometres (3.1 mi) from Labūnava, by the Barupė river and the Pašiliai Forest. The Barupė Hydrographical Sanctuary is located nearby.

In the beginning of the 20th century Pabarupys was an estate.

== Demography ==
Historical population

Year	Pop.	±% p.a.
1923	95	—
1959	67	−0.97%
1970	42	−4.16%
1979	3	−25.41%

Year	Pop.	±% p.a.
1989	1	−10.40%
2001	0	−100.00%
2011	0	0.00%

Source: 1902, 1923, 1959 & 1970, 1979, 1989, 2001, 2011
