= Serbinai =

- Village
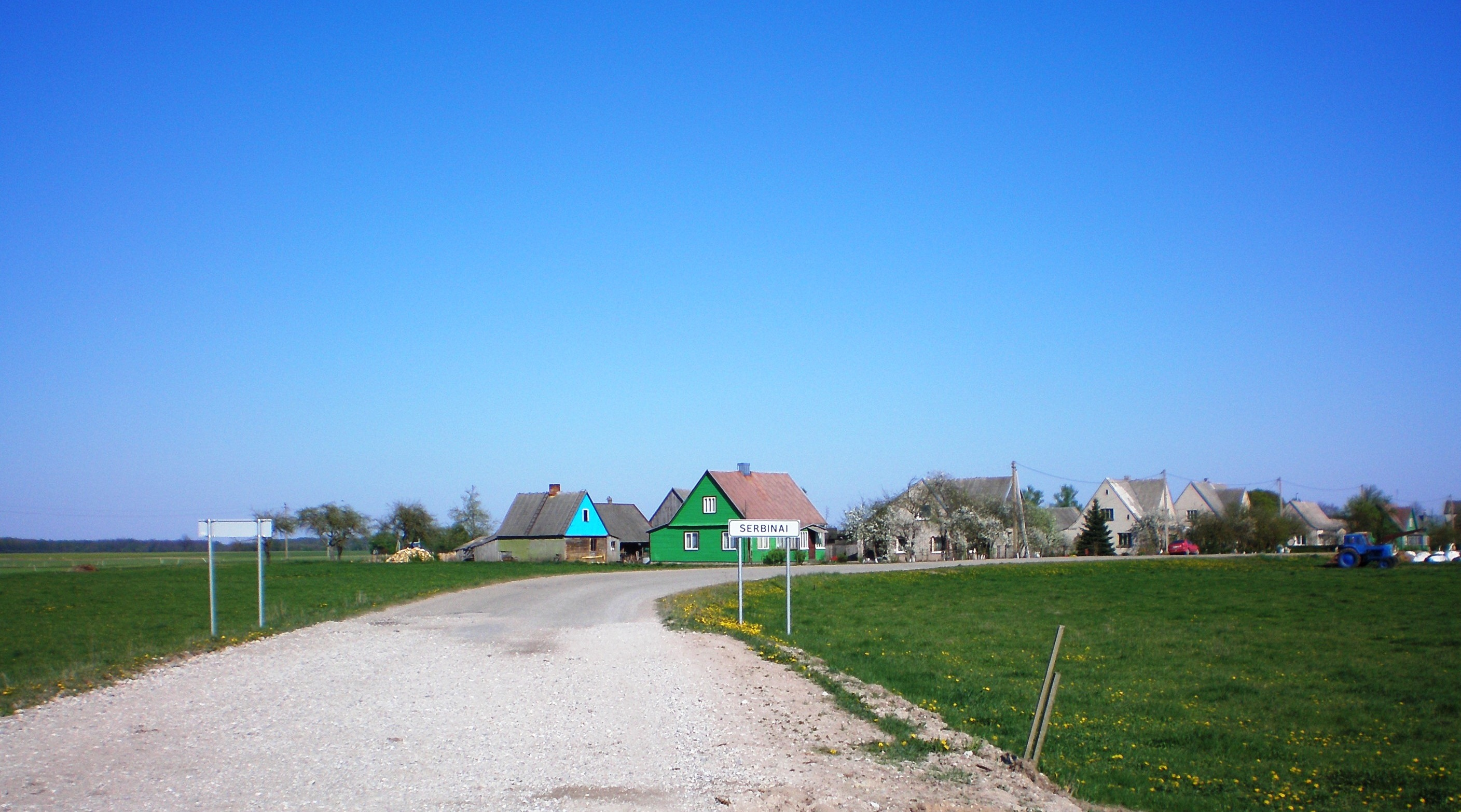

- Location in Lithuania Serbinai (Lithuania)
- Coordinates: 55°12′00″N 23°56′31″E
- Country: Lithuania
- County: Kaunas County
- Municipality: Kėdainiai district municipality
- Eldership: Pelėdnagiai Eldership

Population (2011)
  - Total: 40
- Time zone: UTC+2 (EET)
  - Summer (DST): UTC+3 (EEST)

Serbinai (Polish: Serbiny) is a village in Kėdainiai district municipality, in Kaunas County, in central Lithuania. According to the 2011 census, the village had a population of 40 people. It is located 2.5 kilometres (1.6 mi) from Labūnava, by the Barupė river (the Labūnava Reservoir). There is a grain elevator.

== History ==
In the beginning of the 20th century Serbinai was an estate of the Miłosz (Milošai) family.

== Demography ==
Historical population

Year	Pop.	±% p.a.
1902	27	—
1923	58	+3.71%
1959	52	−0.30%
1970	102	+6.32%

Year	Pop.	±% p.a.
1979	71	−3.95%
1989	36	−6.57%
2001	46	+2.06%
2011	40	−1.39%

Source: 1902, 1923, 1959 & 1970, 1979, 1989, 2001, 2011
