= Slikiai =

- Village
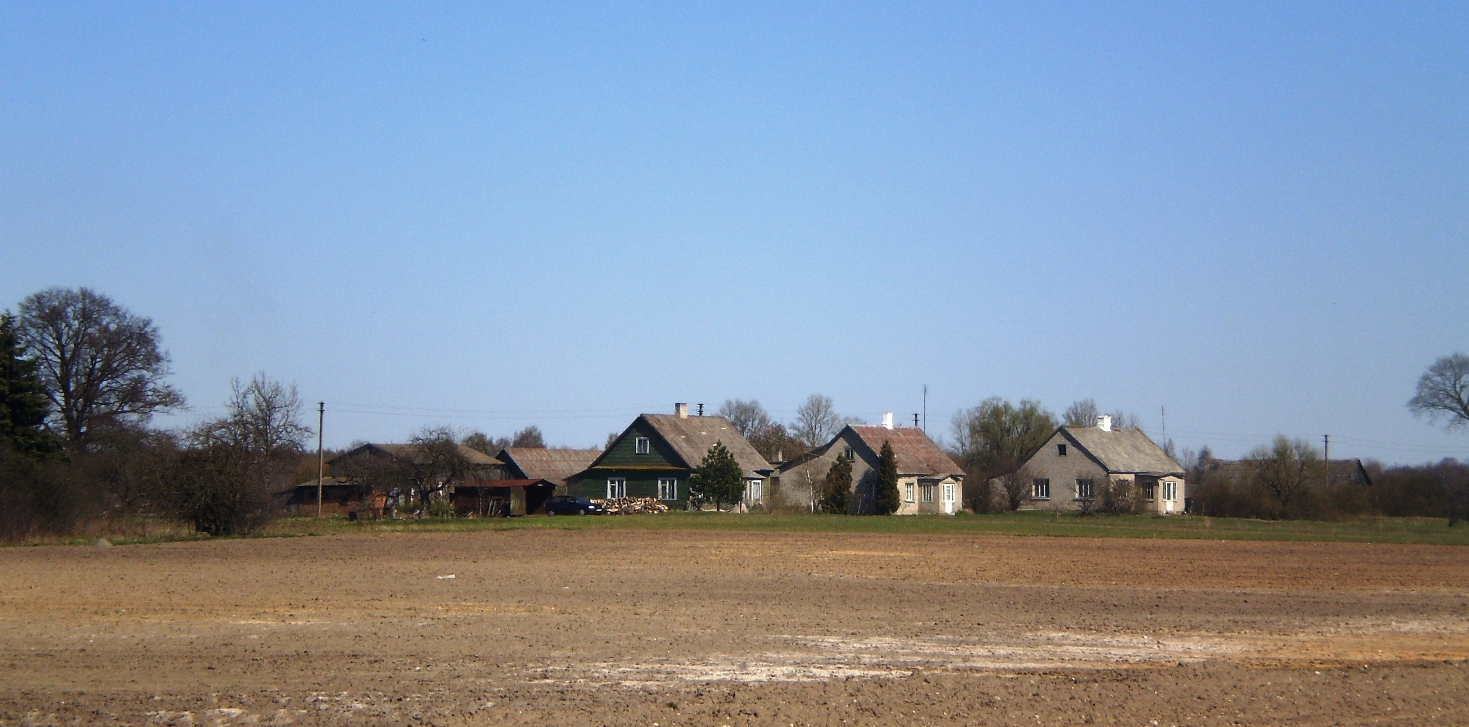

- Location in Lithuania Slikiai (Lithuania)
- Coordinates: 55°13′01″N 24°04′01″E
- Country: Lithuania
- County: Kaunas County
- Municipality: Kėdainiai district municipality
- Eldership: Pelėdnagiai Eldership

Population (2011)
  - Total: 83
- Time zone: UTC+2 (EET)
  - Summer (DST): UTC+3 (EEST)

Slikiai (formerly Russian: Слики, Polish: Sliki) is a village in Kėdainiai district municipality, in Kaunas County, in central Lithuania. According to the 2011 census, the village had a population of 83 people. It is located 3 kilometres (1.9 mi) from Nociūnai, alongside the Nociūnai-Šėta road. A railway station (Slikių GS) is located next to the village. There is an ancient cemetery site and a memorial monument to the local partisans of the Vytis military district.

== Demography ==
Historical population

Year	Pop.	±% p.a.
1902	232	—
1923	194	−0.85%
1959	194	+0.00%
1970	213	+0.85%

Year	Pop.	±% p.a.
1979	159	−3.20%
1989	102	−4.34%
2001	96	−0.50%
2011	83	−1.44%

Source: 1902, 1923, 1959 & 1970, 1979, 1989, 2001, 2011

== Images ==
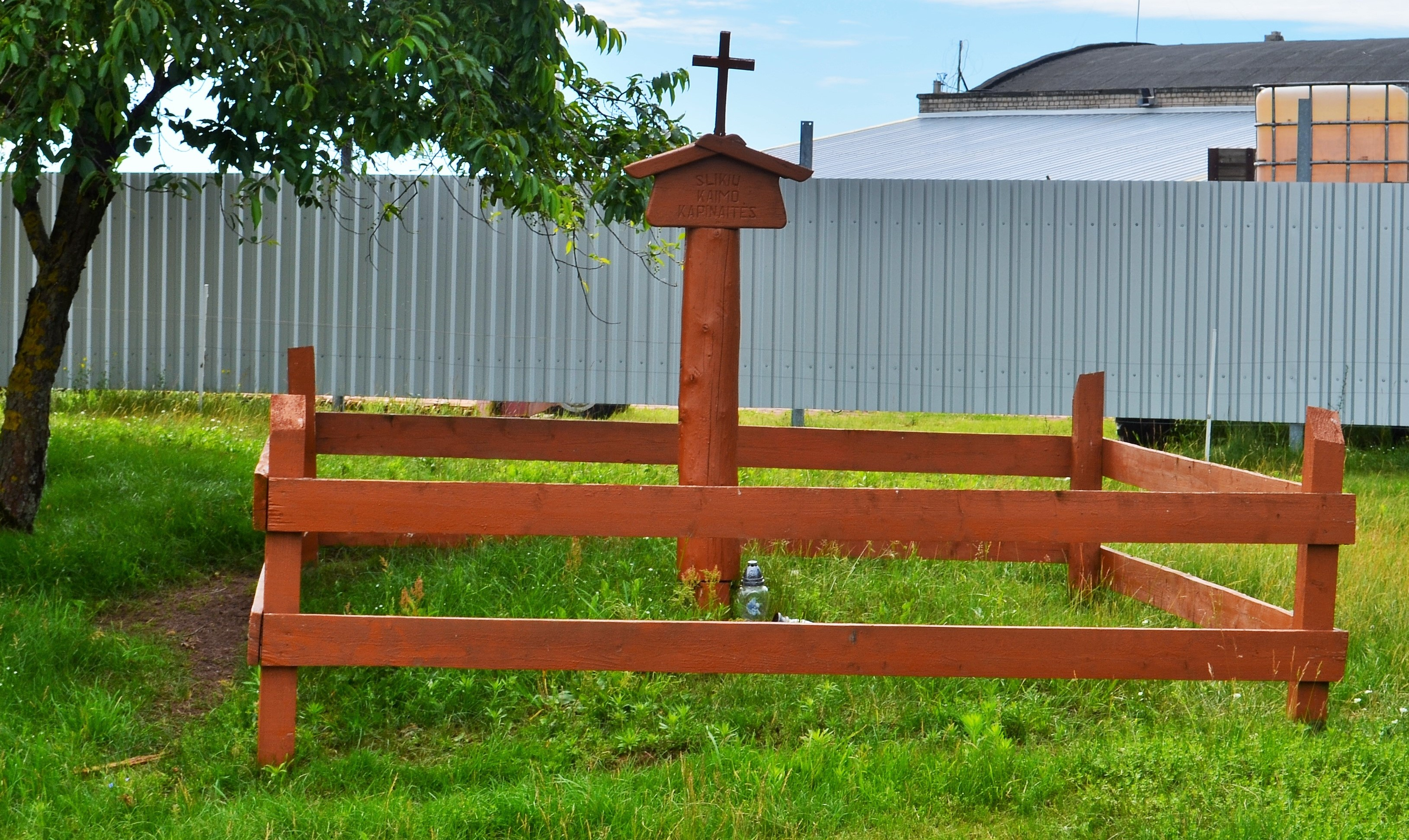
Ancient cemetery site

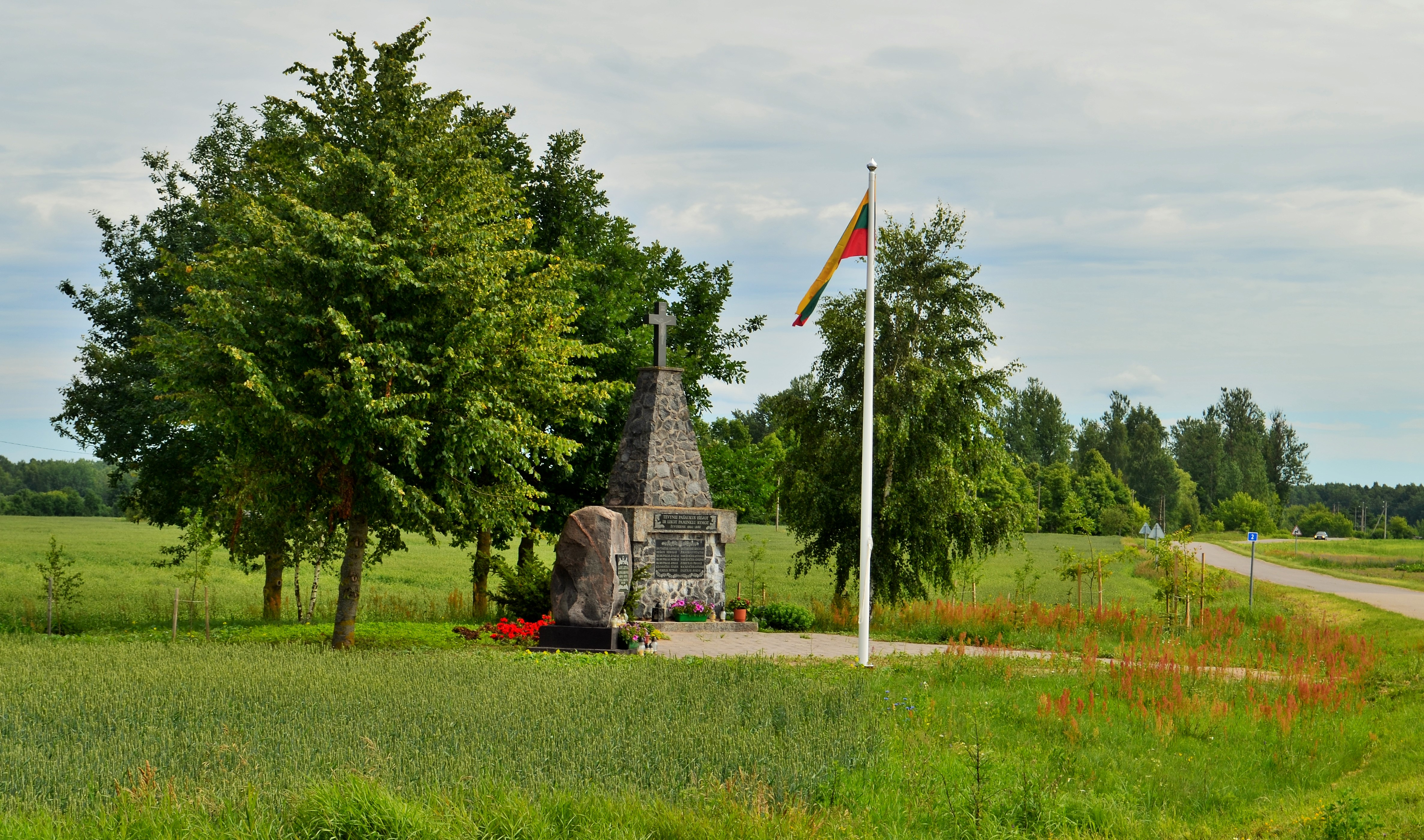
Slikiai memorial

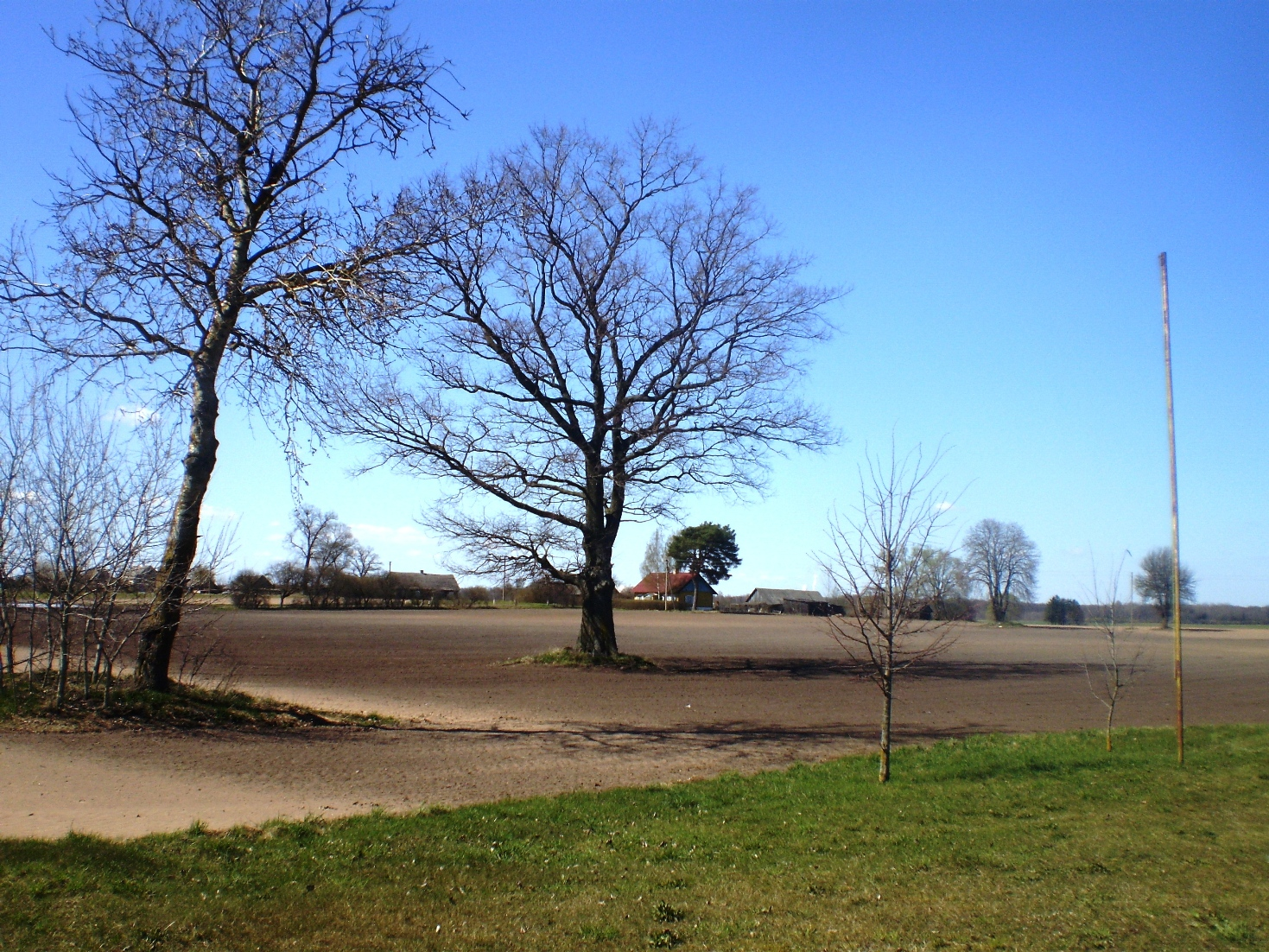
Slikiai surroundings
