= Akliai =

- Village
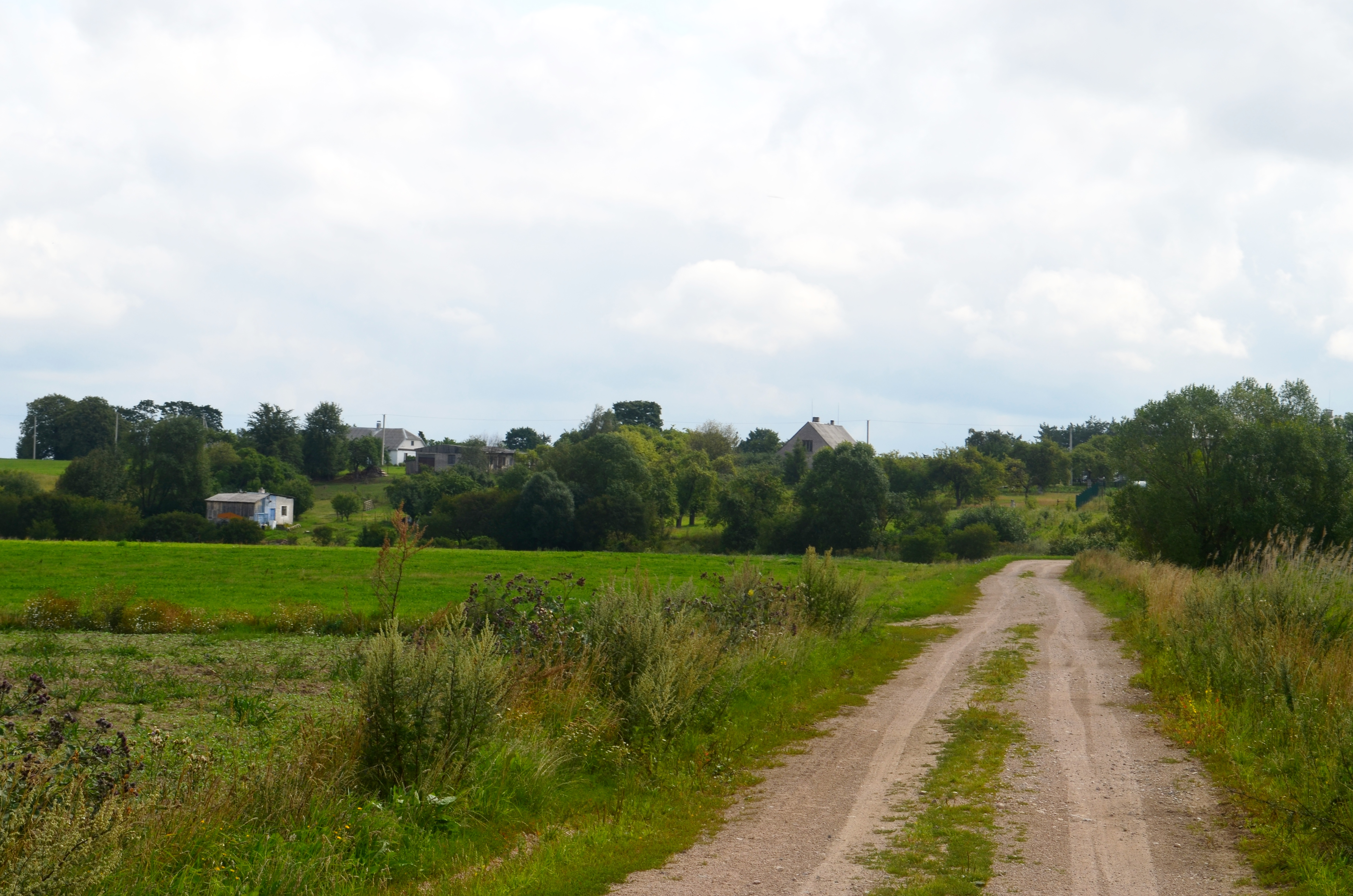

- Location within Lithuania
- Coordinates: 55°12′16.46″N 24°14′10.83″E
- Country: Lithuania
- County: Kaunas County
- Municipality: Jonava
- Eldership: Žeimiai Eldership

Population (2011)
  - Total: 8
- Time zone: UTC+2 (EET)
  - Summer (DST): UTC+3 (EEST)

Akliai is a village in Žeimiai eldership, Jonava district municipality, in Kaunas County, in central Lithuania. According to the 2011 census, the village has a population of 8 people.
