= Ansainiai =

- Village
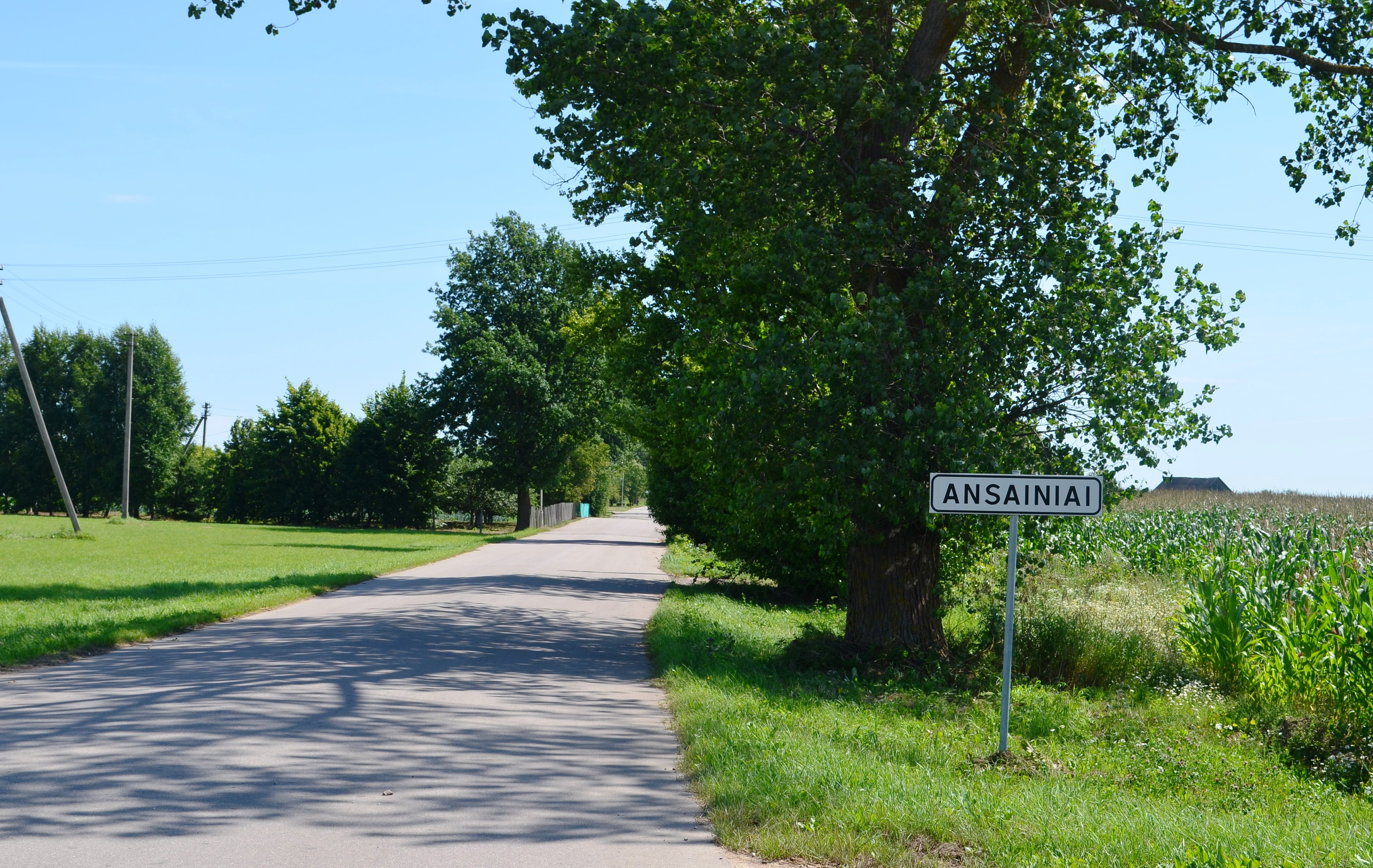

- Location in Lithuania Ansainiai (Lithuania)
- Coordinates: 55°11′31″N 23°55′30″E
- Country: Lithuania
- County: Kaunas County
- Municipality: Kėdainiai district municipality
- Eldership: Pelėdnagiai Eldership

Population (2011)
  - Total: 14
- Time zone: UTC+2 (EET)
  - Summer (DST): UTC+3 (EEST)

Ansainiai (formerly Russian: Ганусевичи, Polish: Hanusewicze) is a village in Kėdainiai district municipality, in Kaunas County, in central Lithuania. According to the 2011 census, the village had a population of 14 people. It is located 0.5 kilometres (0.31 mi) from Labūnava, on the shore of the Labūnava Reservoir. There is a memorial for exiled local inhabitants during the Soviet era.

== History ==
In the beginning of the 20th century, Ansainiai (Hanusewicze) was an okolica, a property of the Butkevičiai, Dautartai, Gineikiai, Hanusaučiai, Ivanaičiai, Jagėlavičiai, Jusevičiai, Kšešanavičiai, Stecevičiai, Uginskiai, Vencevičiai families.

== Demography ==
Historical population

Year	Pop.	±% p.a.
1923	120	—
1959	71	−1.45%
1970	57	−1.98%
1979	21	−10.50%

Year	Pop.	±% p.a.
1989	25	+1.76%
2001	24	−0.34%
2011	14	−5.25%

Source: 1902, 1923, 1959 & 1970, 1979, 1989, 2001, 2011

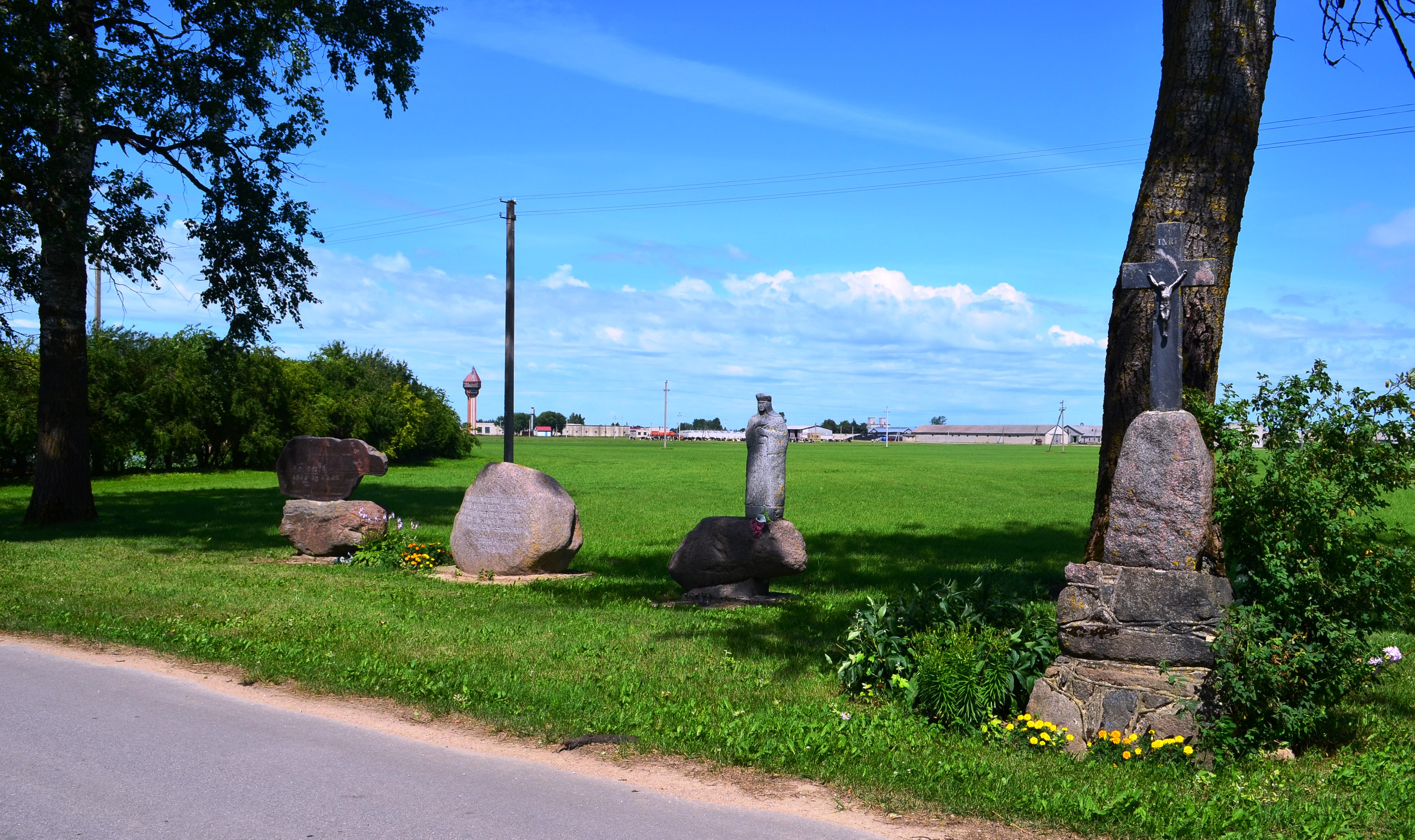
Ansainiai memorial
