= Sičioniai =

- Village
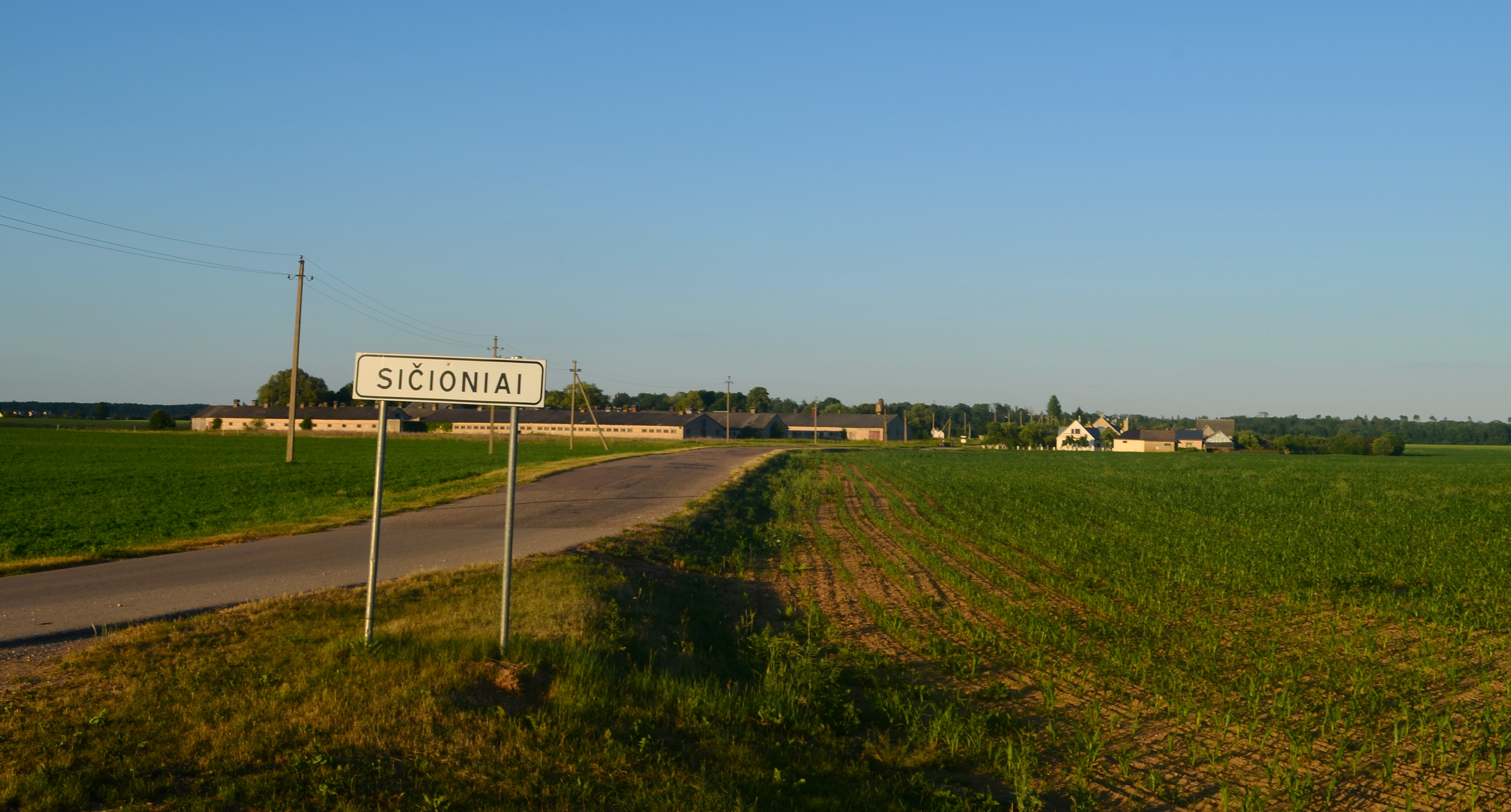

- Location in Lithuania Sičioniai (Lithuania)
- Coordinates: 55°10′41″N 23°55′08″E
- Country: Lithuania
- County: Kaunas County
- Municipality: Kėdainiai district municipality
- Eldership: Pelėdnagiai Eldership

Population (2011)
  - Total: 27
- Time zone: UTC+2 (EET)
  - Summer (DST): UTC+3 (EEST)

Sičioniai (formerly Russian: Сычаны) is a village in Kėdainiai district municipality, in Kaunas County, in central Lithuania. According to the 2011 census, the village had a population of 27 people. It is located 1 kilometre (0.62 mi) from Labūnava, on the shore of the Labūnava Reservoir, nearby the Labūnava Forest. There is a cemetery.

== Demography ==
Historical population

| Year | Pop. | ±% p.a. |
|---|---|---|
| 1902 | 110 | — |
| 1923 | 117 | +0.29% |
| 1959 | 116 | −0.02% |
| 1970 | 87 | −2.58% |

| Year | Pop. | ±% p.a. |
|---|---|---|
| 1979 | 41 | −8.02% |
| 1989 | 47 | +1.38% |
| 2001 | 42 | −0.93% |
| 2011 | 27 | −4.32% |

Source: 1902, 1923, 1959 & 1970, 1979, 1989, 2001, 2011
