= Barupė =

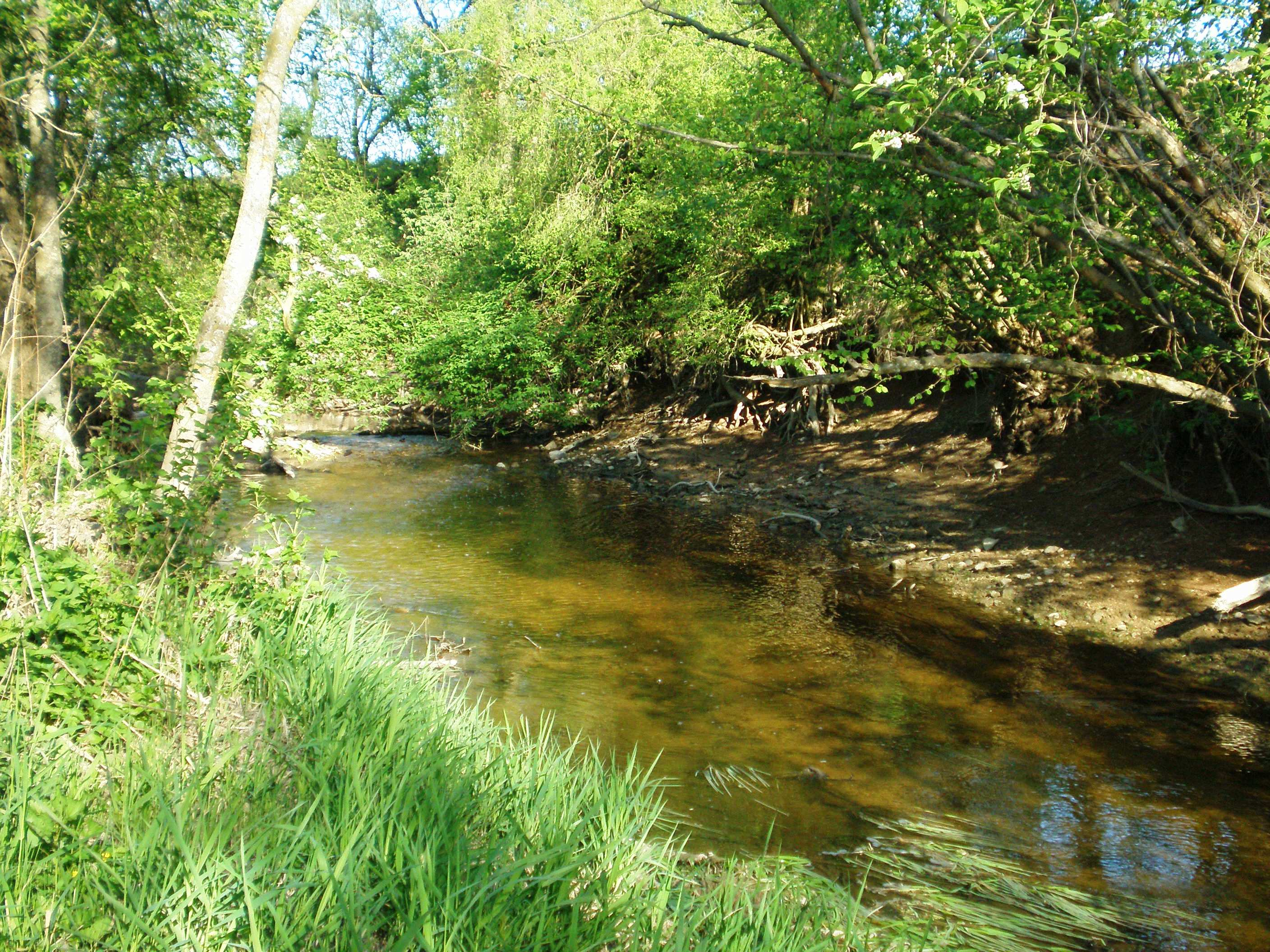
- Barupė in Pabarupys

Location
- Country: Lithuania
- Region: Kaunas County

Physical characteristics
- Source
  - location: Nearby Žinėnai, Jonava District Municipality
- Mouth: Nevėžis in Labūnava
  - coordinates: 55.2036°N 23.9056°E
- Length: 48.2 km (30.0 mi)
- Basin size: 322.4 km^{2} (124.5 sq mi)
- Discharge
  - average: 1.55 m³/s

Basin features
- Progression: Nevėžis→ Neman→ Baltic Sea
- Tributaries
  - left: Savyda, Mėkla, Urka
  - right: Kulvė, Vabalas, Paparčia

The Barupė is a river in Jonava District Municipality and Kėdainiai District Municipality of Kaunas County, in central Lithuania. It flows for 48.2 kilometres (30.0 mi) and has a basin area of 322 square kilometres (124 sq mi). It is a left tributary of the Nevėžis.

The Barupė starts at Žinėnai village, in Jonava District Municipality. It flows northwards, before turning to the west in Pamelnytėlė. It meets the Nevėžis near Labūnava village.

The upper course in channalised. The lower course has a deep valley. The course has a width of 5–12 metres (16–39 ft) and depth of 0.1–0.4 metres (3.9 in – 1 ft 3.7 in). The flow rate is 0.1–0.2 metres per second (0.33–0.66 ft/s). Labūnava Reservoir dams the Barupė river; smaller ponds are also located in the Barupė valley in Kuigaliai and Labūnava.

Sangailiškiai, Kuigaliai, Pėdžiai, Nociūnai, Serbinai, Labūnava villages are located on the shores of the Barupė. A part of river's lower course is protected as the Barupė Landscape Sanctuary.

The hydronym is of uncertain origin. The component upė means 'river' while the root bar- could be of archaic origin, related to Russian: бара 'puddle', Ukrainian: бар 'slough between hills', Illyrian languages: *bar(b)- 'puddle'.
