= Žeimiai =

- Town
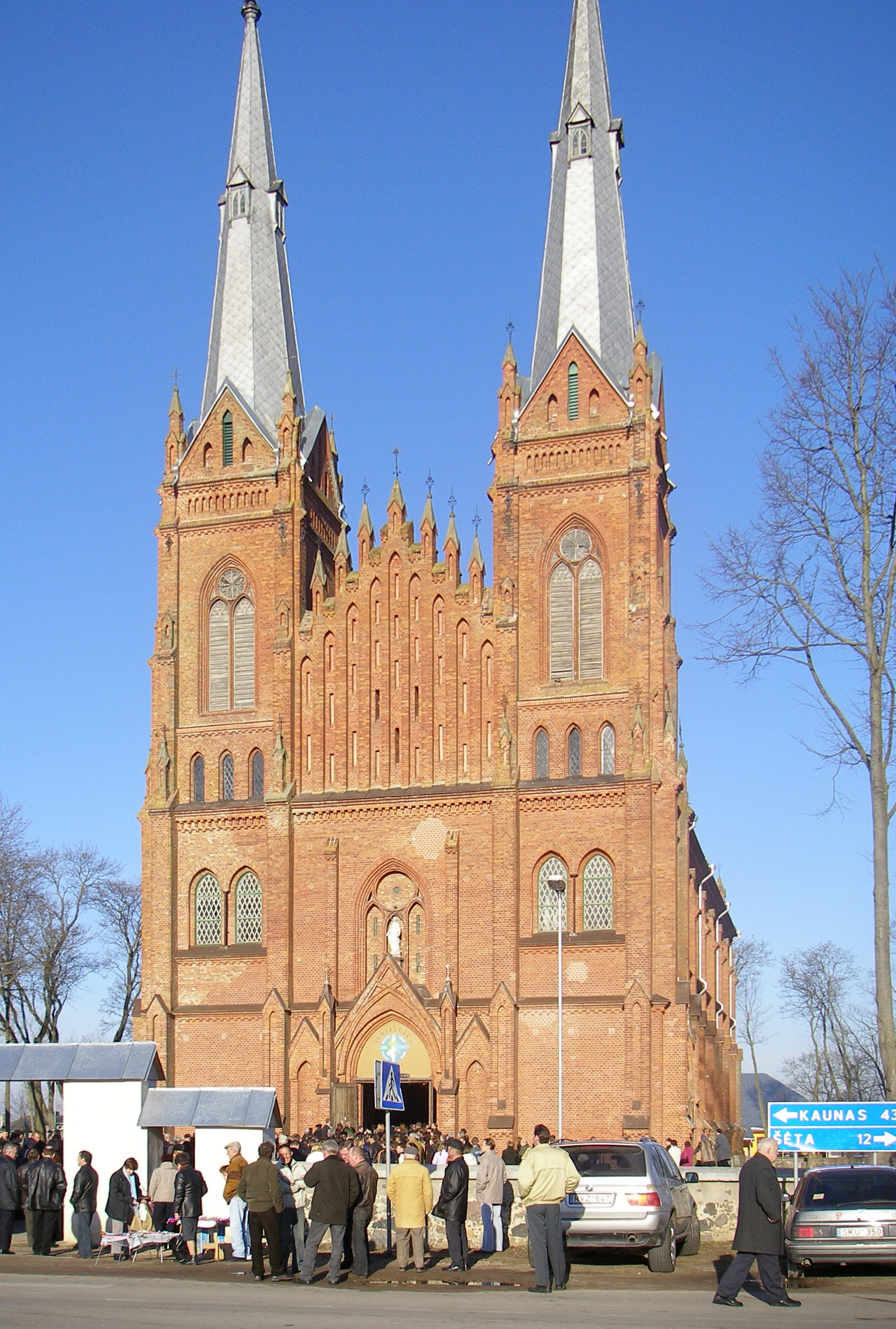

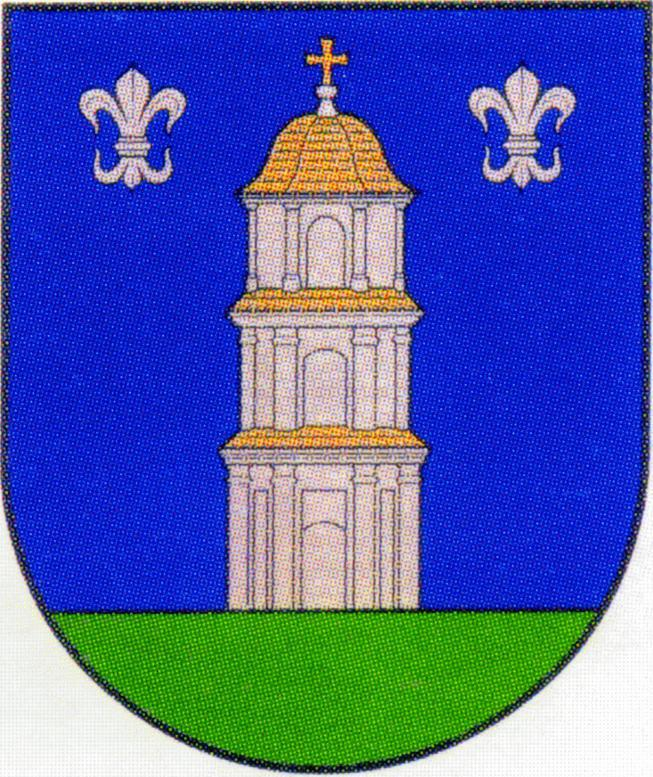
- Coat of arms

- Location in Lithuania
- Coordinates: 55°10′50″N 24°13′20″E
- Country: Lithuania
- Ethnographic region: Aukštaitija
- County: Kaunas County
- Municipality: Jonava district municipality
- Eldership: Žeimiai Eldership

Population (2011)
  - Total: 860
- Time zone: UTC+2 (EET)
  - Summer (DST): UTC+3 (EEST)

Žeimiai (Polish: Żejmy) is a small town in Kaunas County in central Lithuania the center of the Žeimiai Eldership. As of 2011 it had a population of 860.

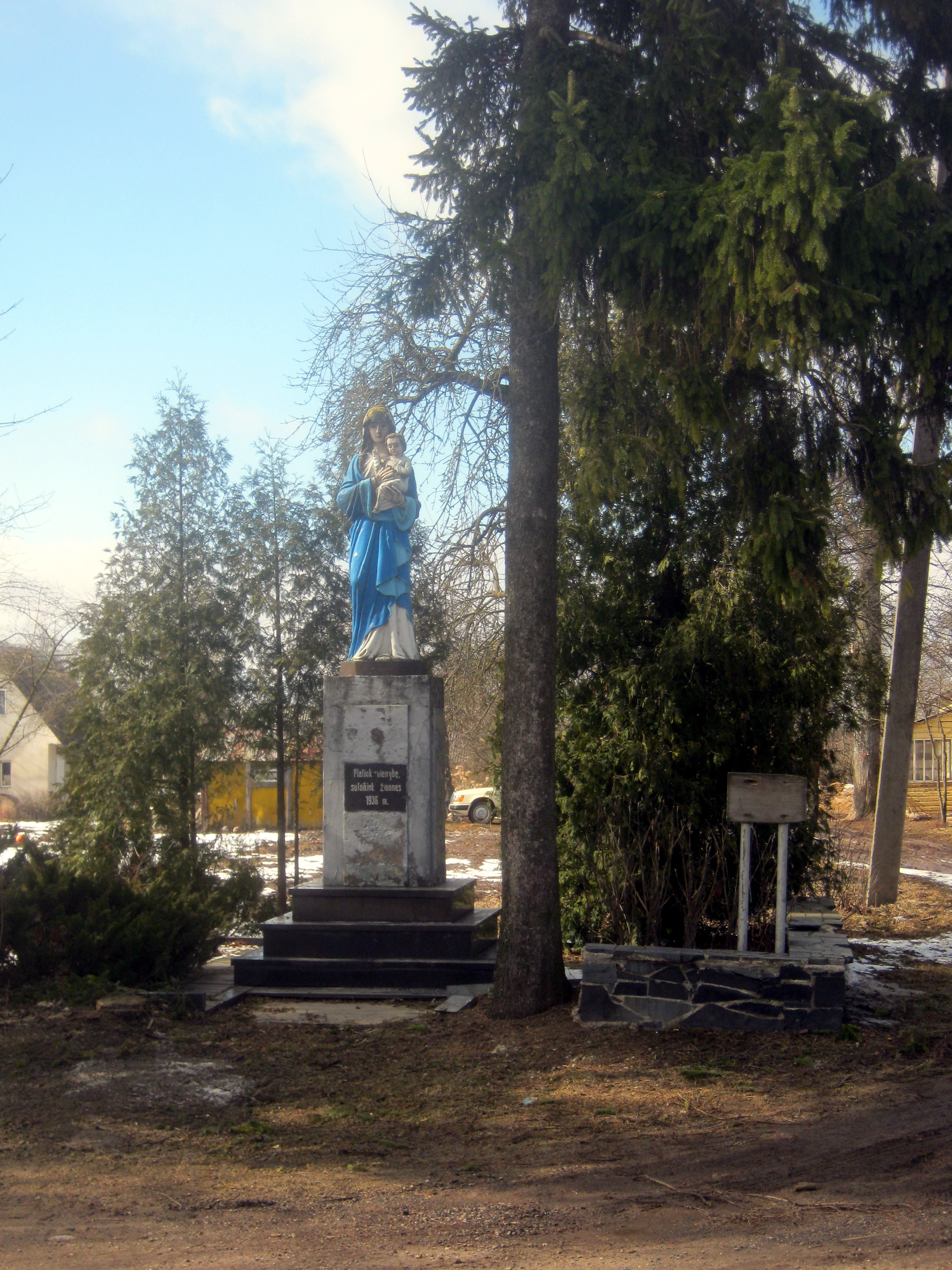

== History ==
Before the Holocaust, the town had a Jewish population who were murdered in 1941 in mass executions perpetrated an einsatzgruppen of Germans and Lithuanian collaborators.

Polish architect Wacław Michniewicz, who was responsible for designing many buildings in Lithuania, designed the church in the town, and was buried in the churchyard there in 1947.
