= Žeimiai Eldership =

Žeimiai Eldership Žeimių seniūnija
- Eldership
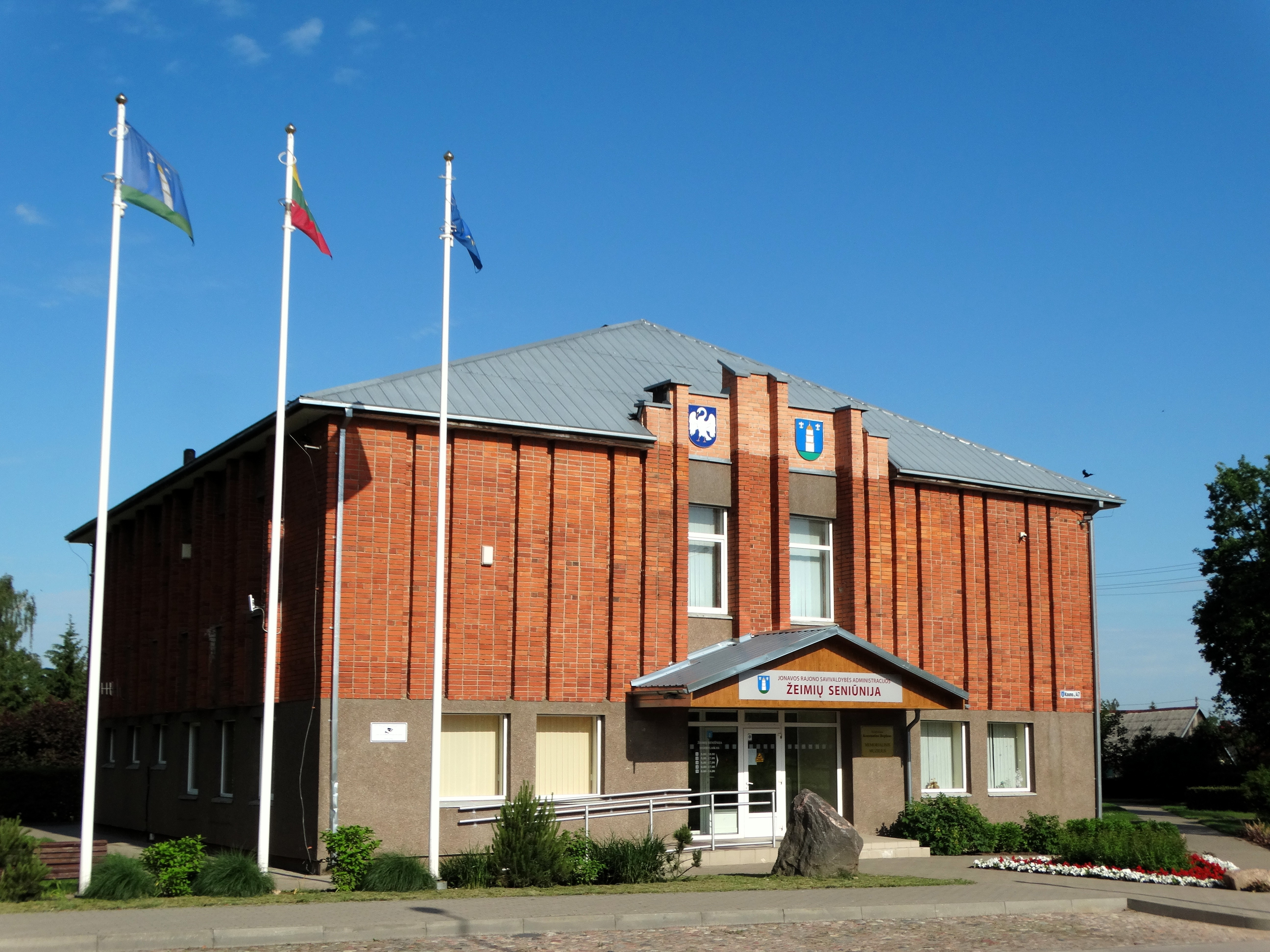
- Žeimiai Eldership office

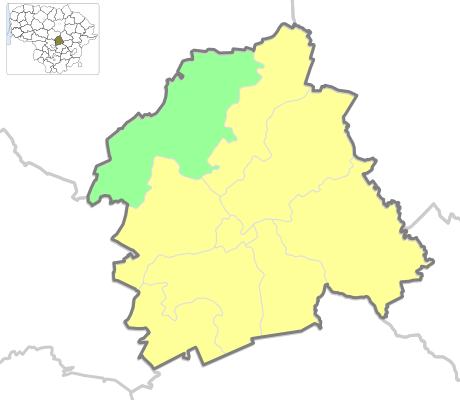
- Location of Žeimiai eldership
- Coordinates: 55°11′N 24°10′E
- Country: Lithuania
- Ethnographic region: Aukštaitija
- County: Kaunas County
- Municipality: Jonava District Municipality
- Administrative centre: Žeimiai

Area
  - Total: 154.93 km^{2} (59.82 sq mi)

Population (2021)
  - Total: 1,774
  - Density: 11.45/km^{2} (29.66/sq mi)
- Time zone: UTC+2 (EET)
  - Summer (DST): UTC+3 (EEST)

Žeimiai Eldership (Lithuanian: Žeimių seniūnija) is a Lithuanian eldership, located in a northern part of Jonava District Municipality. As of 2020, administrative centre and largest settlement within eldership was Žeimiai.

== Demography ==
Historical population

Year	Pop.	±% p.a.
2001	2,553	—
2011	2,238	−1.31%

Year	Pop.	±% p.a.
2021	1,774	−2.30%

Source: 1902, 1923, 1959 & 1970, 1979, 1989, 2001, 20112021

== Elections ==
=== 2023 municipality elections ===
Political party	Municipality elections	
Political party	Votes	%
Social Democratic Party of Lithuania	301	50.93%
Lithuanian Farmers and Greens Union	115	19.46%
Union of Democrats "For Lithuania"	55	9.31%
Political committee Our Jonava	34	5.75%
Labour Party	34	5.75%
Homeland Union	24	4.06%
Lithuanian Regions Party	17	2.88%
Liberals' Movement	7	1.18%
Freedom Party (Lithuania)	4	0.68%
Total registered voters: 1,537		Turnout: 38.45%
