= Nociūnai =

- Village
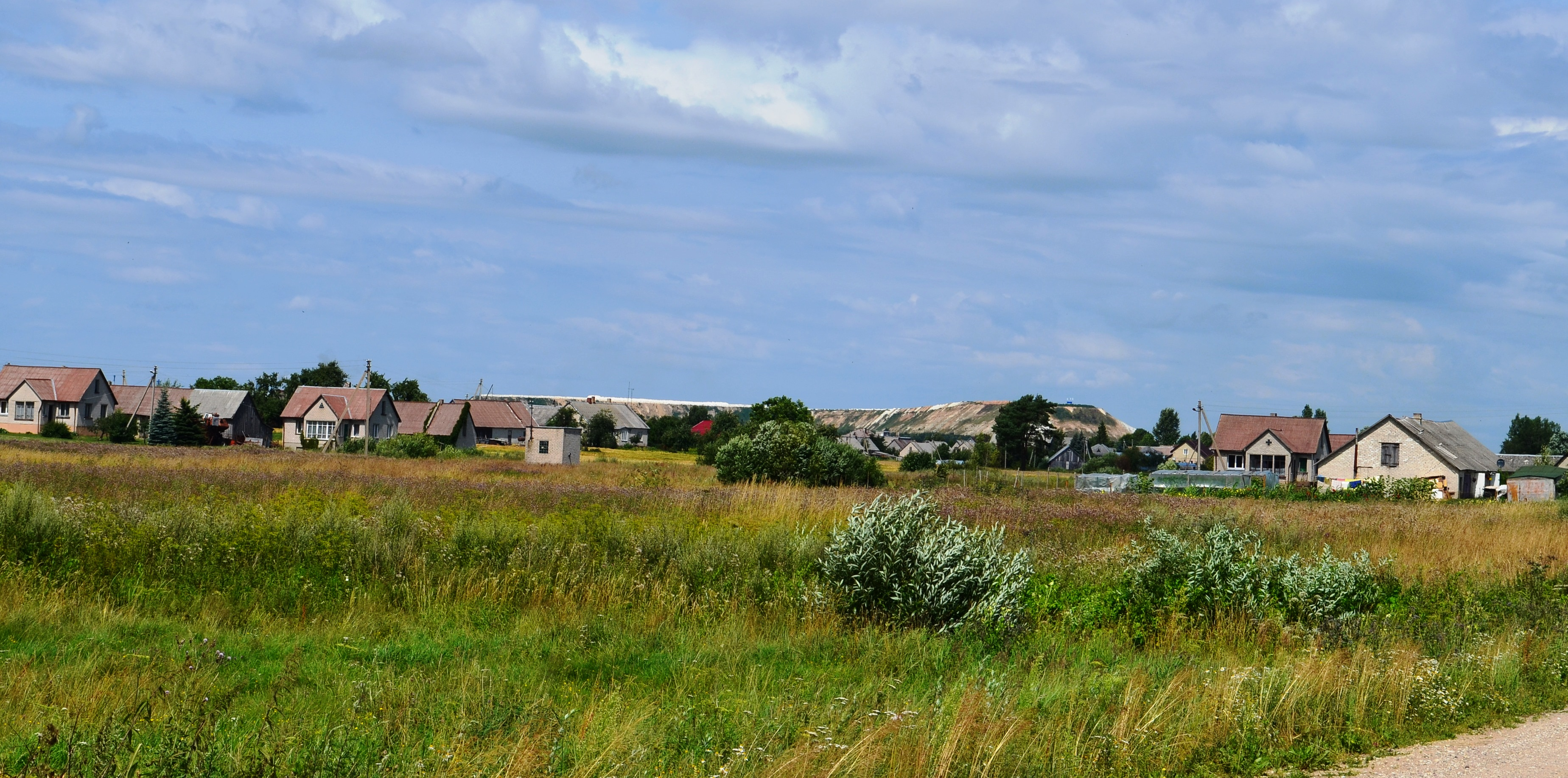

- Location in Lithuania Nociūnai (Lithuania)
- Coordinates: 55°13′08″N 24°02′20″E
- Country: Lithuania
- County: Kaunas County
- Municipality: Kėdainiai district municipality
- Eldership: Pelėdnagiai Eldership
- Elevation: 69 m (226 ft)

Population (2011)
  - Total: 304
- Time zone: UTC+2 (EET)
  - Summer (DST): UTC+3 (EEST)

Nociūnai (formerly Russian: Нацуны, Polish: Nacuny) is a village in Kėdainiai district municipality of Kaunas County, in central Lithuania. According to the 2011 census, the village had 304 residents. It is located 9 kilometres (5.6 mi) from Kėdainiai, by the Barupė river, next to the intersection of the Jonava-Šeduva (KK144) road and A8 highway. The village contains a library, a community center, a former school, a cemetery, and an ancient burial site.

== History ==
The Nociūnai Manor was a property of the Šiukštos family in the 19th century. There was a wooden familial tomb-chapel, built in 1805.

During the Soviet era, Nociūnai was a center of the "Spike" kolkhoz.

== Demography ==
Historical population

Year	Pop.	±% p.a.
1902	142	—
1923	238	+2.49%
1959	207	−0.39%
1970	196	−0.50%
1979	266	+3.45%

Year	Pop.	±% p.a.
1986	361	+4.46%
1989	377	+1.46%
2001	393	+0.35%
2011	304	−2.54%

Source: 1902, 1923, 1959 & 1970, 1979, 1989, 2001, 2011

== Images ==
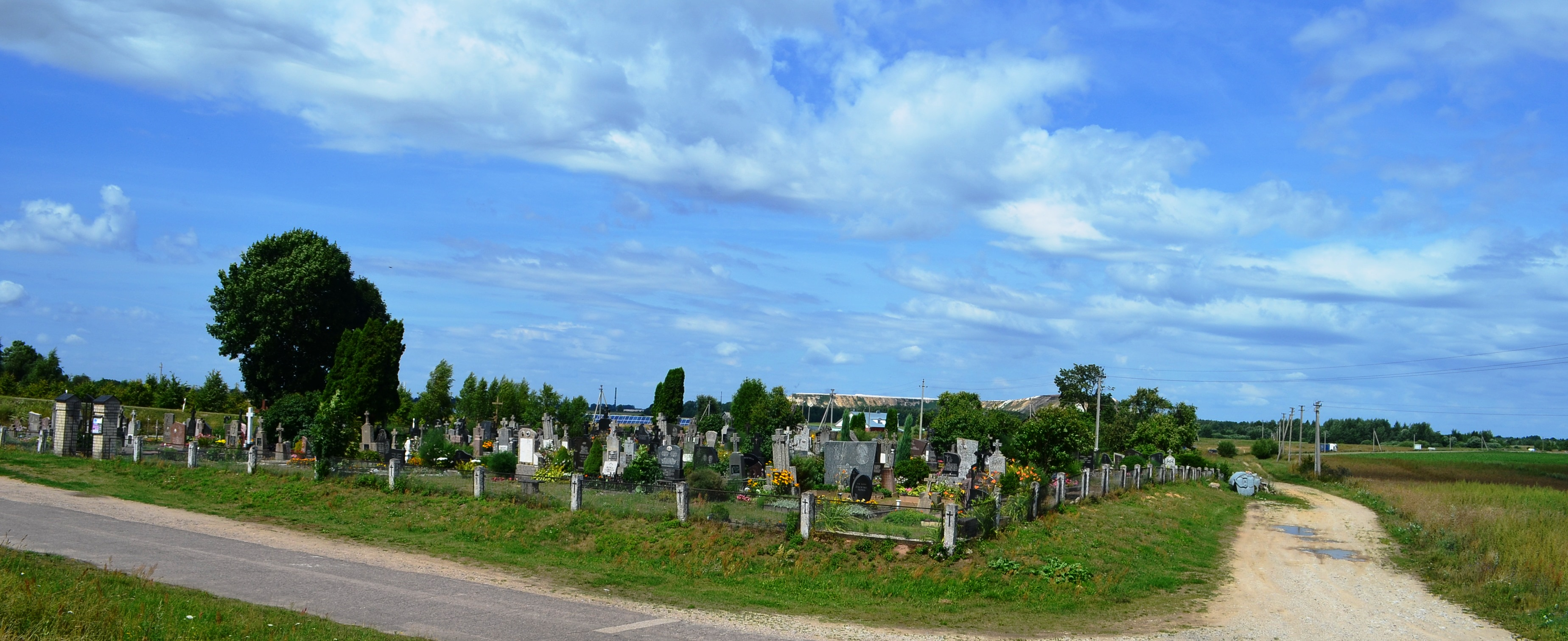
Nociūnai cemetery

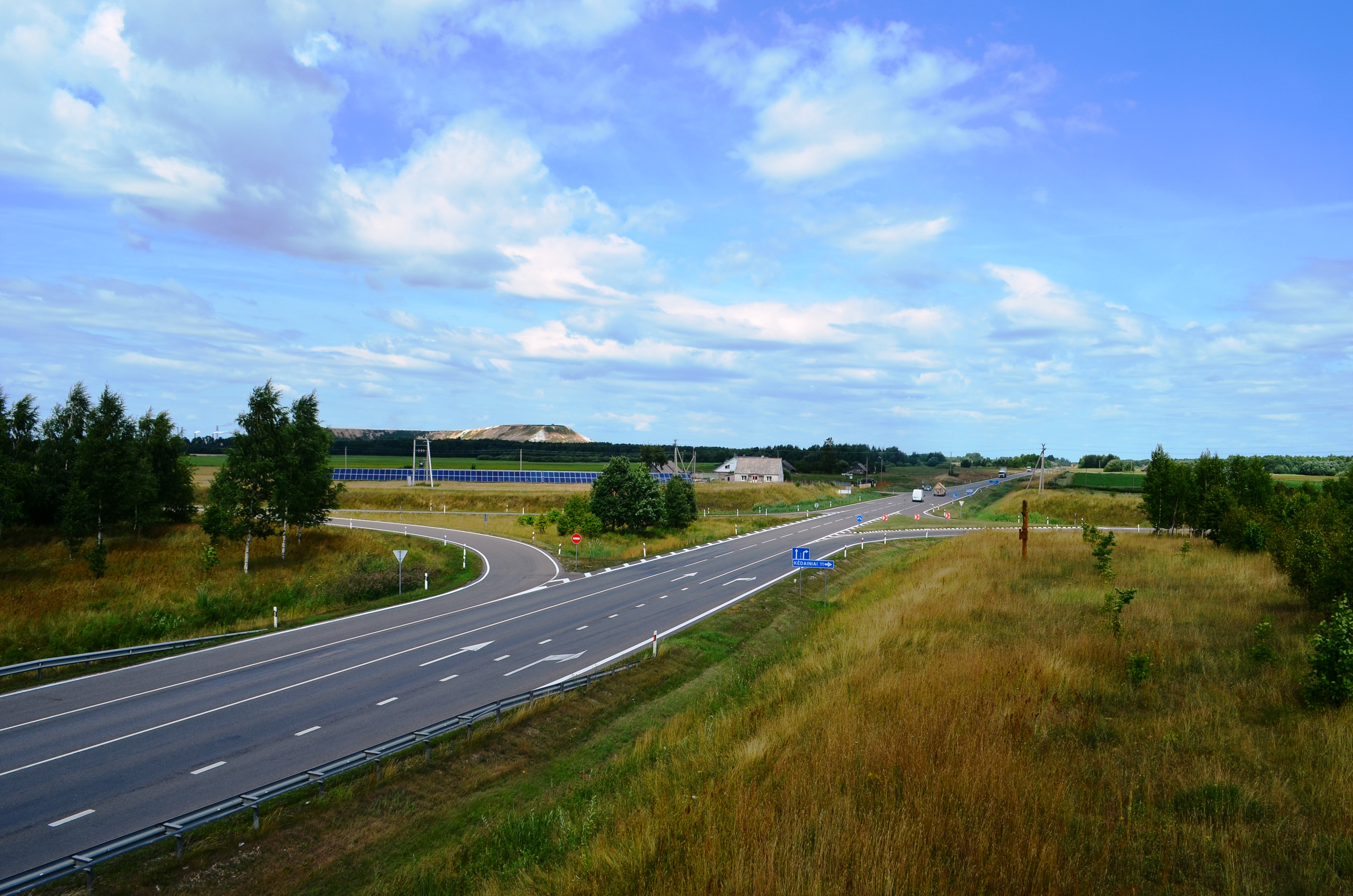
A8 highway next to Nociūnai

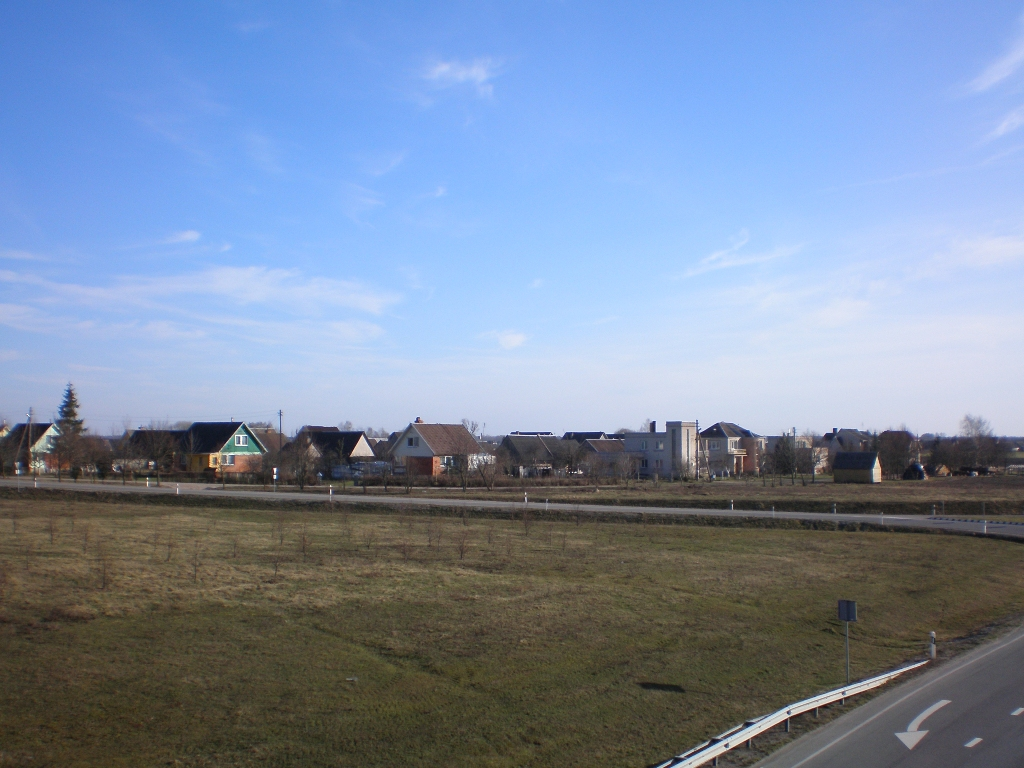
Nociūnai village looking from the road
