= Labūnava =

- Town
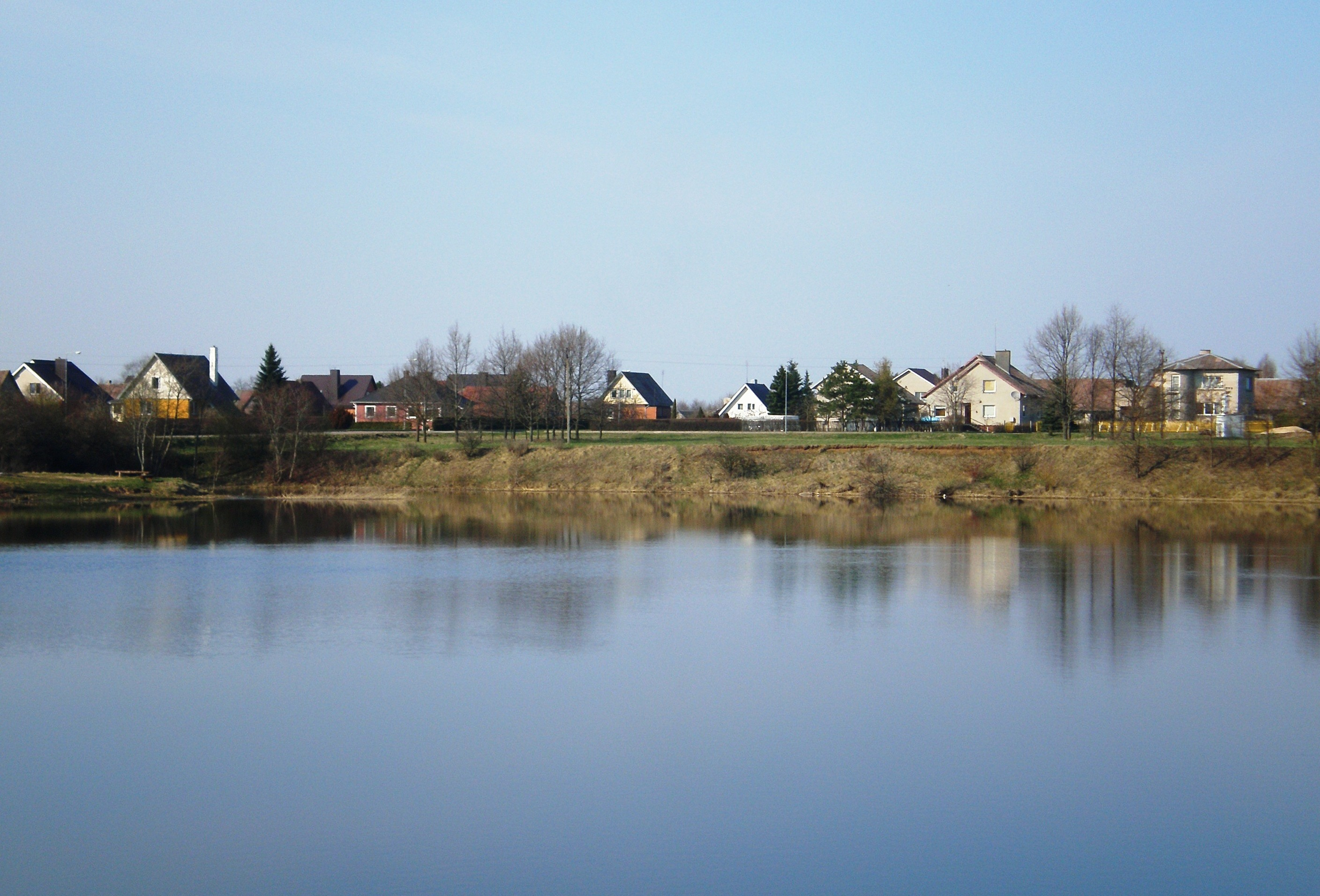

- Location in Lithuania Labūnava (Lithuania)
- Coordinates: 55°11′31″N 23°54′22″E
- Country: Lithuania
- County: Kaunas County
- Municipality: Kėdainiai district municipality
- Eldership: Pelėdnagiai Eldership

Population (2011)
  - Total: 747
- Time zone: UTC+2 (EET)
  - Summer (DST): UTC+3 (EEST)

Labūnava (formerly Russian: Лабуновъ, Лабуново, Polish: Łabunów) is a small town in Kėdainiai district municipality, in Kaunas County, central Lithuania. According to the 2011 census, town residents numbered 747. It is 11 kilometres (6.8 mi) from Kėdainiai, on the left bank of the Nevėžis river, by its tributary the Barupė. The Labūnava Reservoir on the Barupė is located next to the town. Labūnava has a kindergarten, a library, a school, a forestry, an agriculture cooperative, a Catholic church of the Divine, a cemetery, and some ruins of the former manor (two towers and a hunting lodge).

== History ==
In the 14th century, Labūnava faced attacks from the Teutonic Knights. It was mentioned for the first time in 1364, in the chronicle of Hermann von Wartberge. The Labūnava manor has been known since the 16th century. Labūnava was burned in Napoleon's 1812 campaign.

Labūnava developed greatly in the Soviet era. It became a center of the "Eastern Dawn" kolkhoz. This kolkhoz was one of the leading ones in all Lithuanian SSR. Labūnava settlement received an award at the USSR People's Achievements' Exposition in 1978.

== Demography ==
Historical population

Year	Pop.	±% p.a.
1867	60	—
1902	65	+0.23%
1923	175	+4.83%
1959	36	−4.30%
1970	193	+16.49%
1979	734	+16.00%

Year	Pop.	±% p.a.
1985	847	+2.42%
1989	882	+1.02%
2001	939	+0.52%
2006	915	−0.52%
2011	747	−3.98%

Source: 1902, 1923, 1959 & 1970, 1979, 1989, 2001, 2011

== Images ==
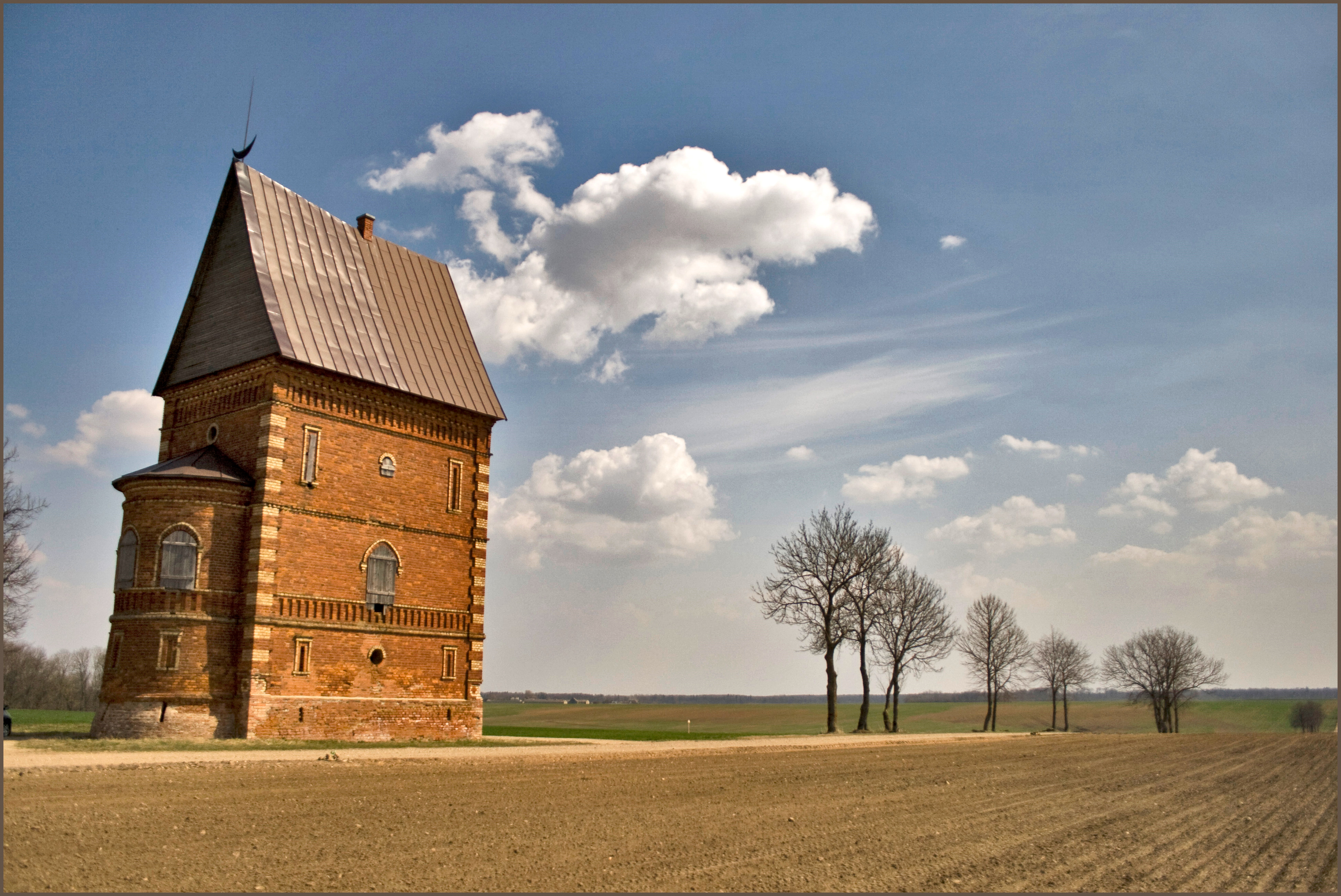
Labūnava Manor tower

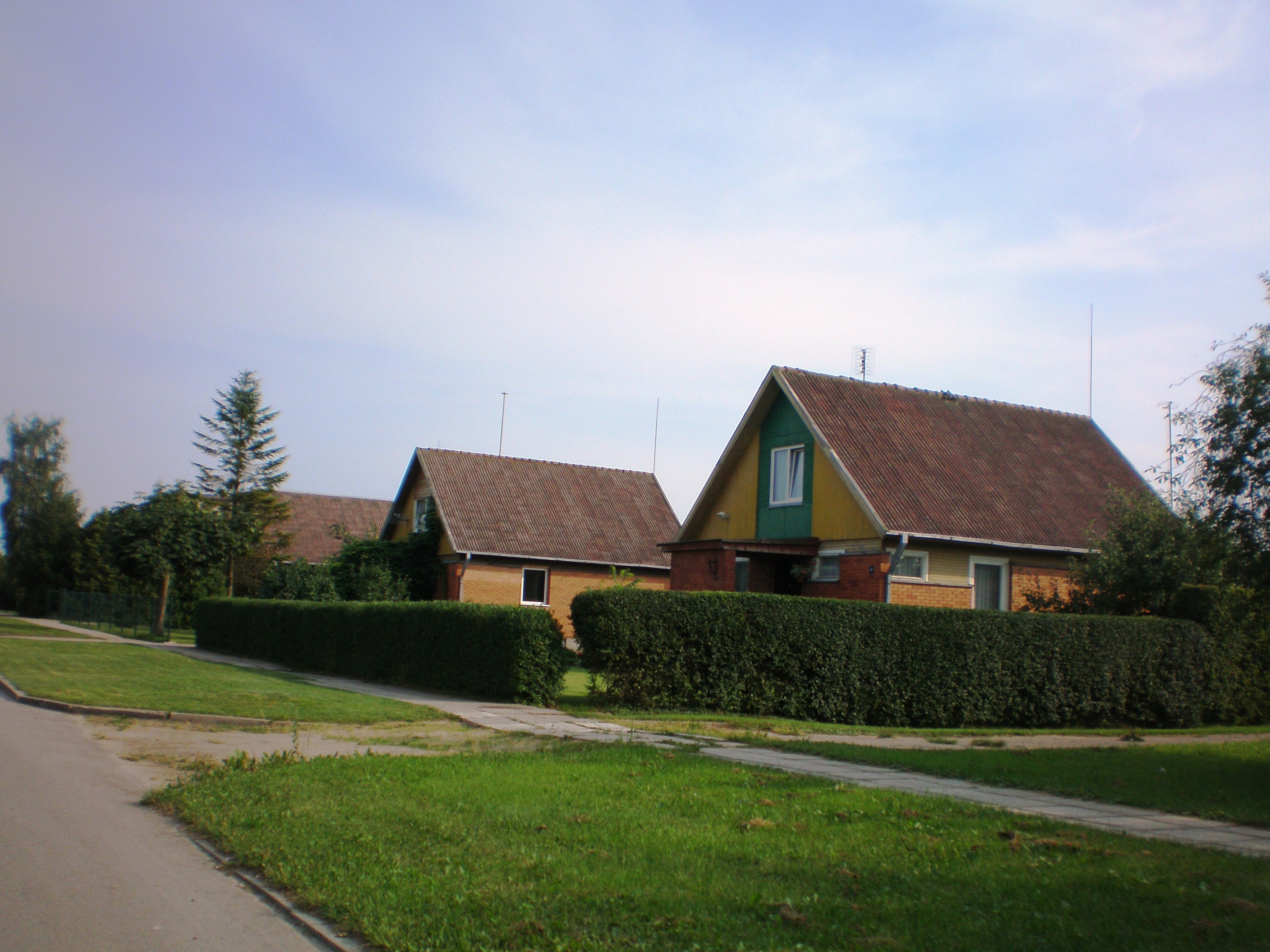
Barupė street

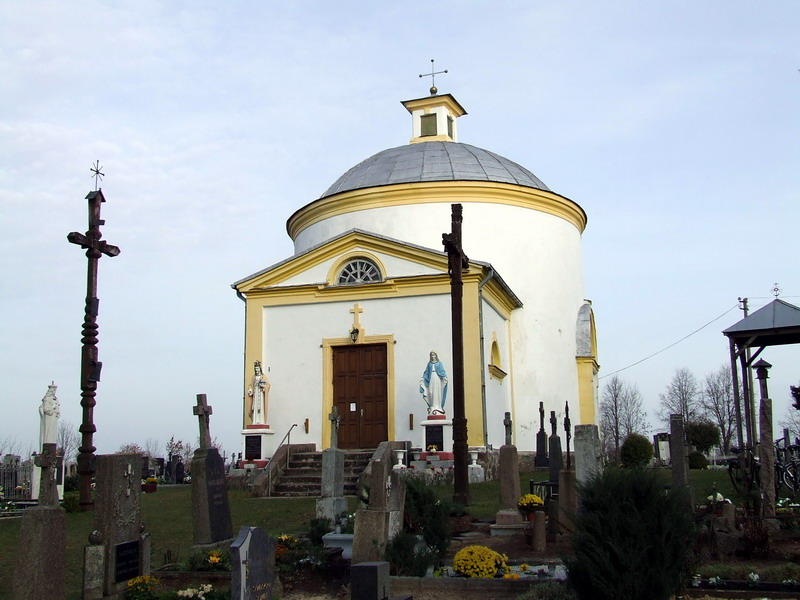
Labūnava Church

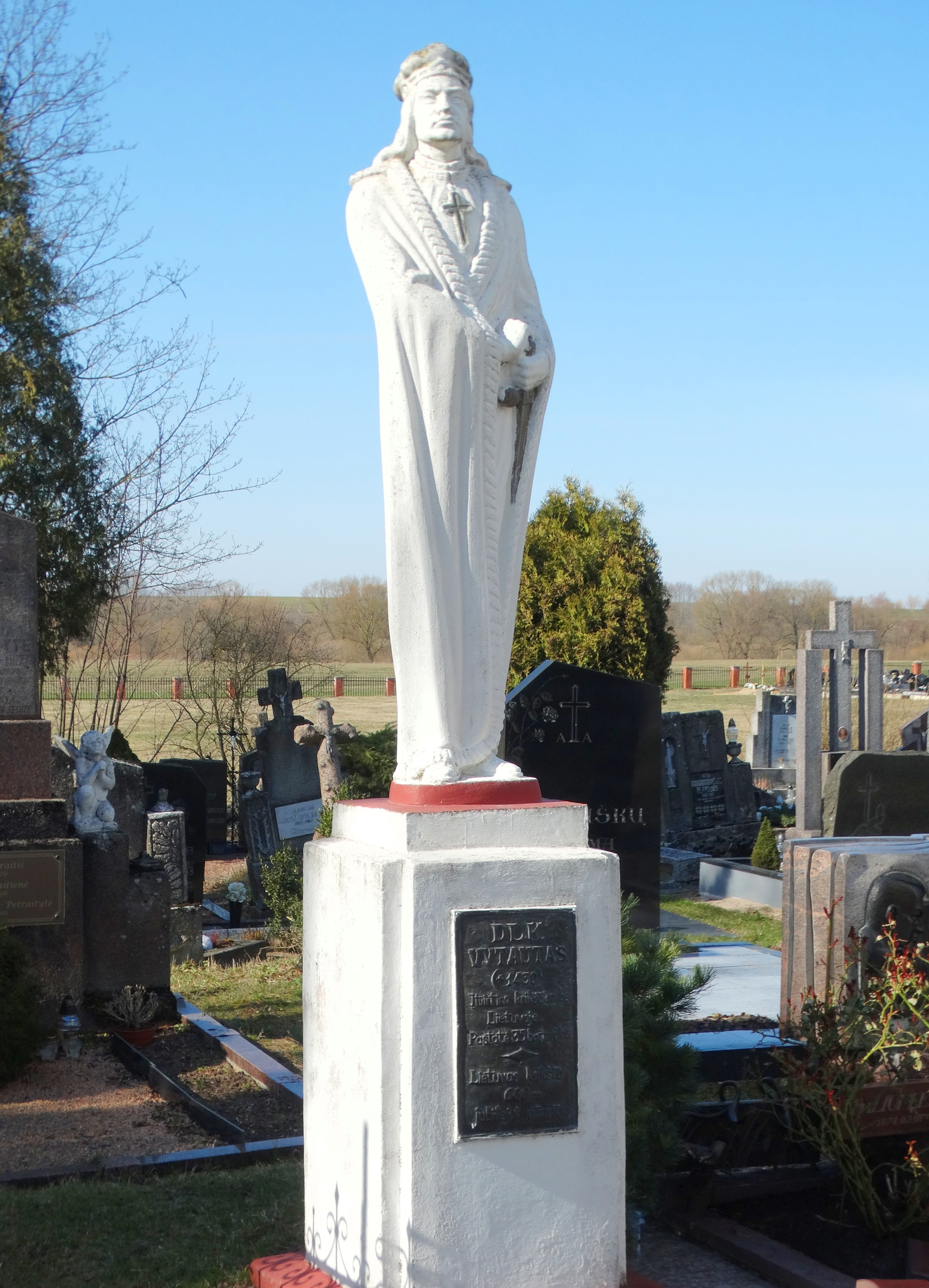
Vytautas monument in the Labūnava cemetery
