= Novaya Yolcha rural council =

Novaya Yolcha rural council (Belarusian: Новаялчанскі сельсавет, Russian: Новоиолченский сельсовет) is a lower-level subdivision (selsoviet) of Brahin district, Gomel region, Belarus. Its capital is the village of Krasnaye, Brahin district. According to the 2019 Belarus census, its population was 935.
