= Barawlyany =

Barawlyany (Belarusian: Бараўляны, romanized: Baraŭliany) or Borovlyany (Russian: Боровляны) may refer to the following places in Belarus:

- Barawlyany, Barysaw District
- Barawlyany, Minsk District
- Barawlyany, Vitebsk District
- Barawlyany, Ushachy District
- Barawlyany, Minsk district rural council, a selsoviet in Belarus
