= Kamaryn rural council =

Kamaryn rural council (Belarusian: Камарынскі сельсавет, Russian: Комаринский сельсовет) is a lower-level subdivision (selsoviet) of Brahin district, Gomel region, Belarus. Its capital is the urban settlement of Kamaryn. According to the 2019 Belarus census, its population was 2,554.
