= Malazhyn rural council =

Malazhyn rural council (Belarusian: Малажынскі сельсавет, Russian: Маложинский сельсовет) is a lower-level subdivision (selsoviet) of Brahin district, Gomel region, Belarus. Its capital is the agrotown of Malazhyn. According to the 2019 Belarus census, its population was 1,100.
