= Vuhly, Brahin district rural council =

Vuhly rural council (Belarusian: Вуглоўскі сельсавет, Russian: Угловский сельсовет) is a lower-level subdivision (selsoviet) of Brahin district, Gomel region, Belarus. Its capital is the agrotown of Vuhly. According to the 2019 Belarus census, its population was 833.
