= Kalodzishchy rural council =

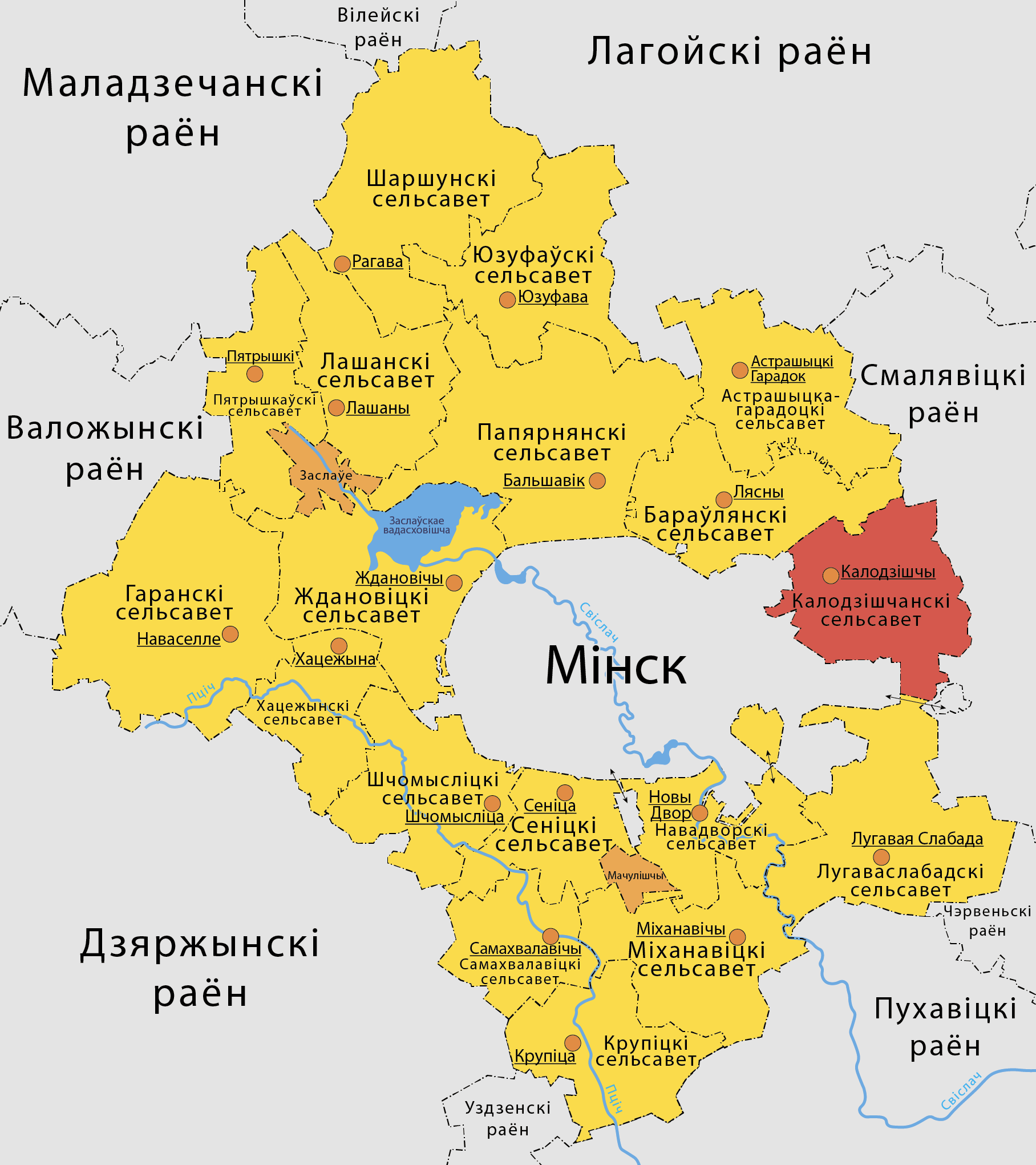
Map of Minsk District

Kalodzishchy rural council (Belarusian: Калодзішчанскі сельсавет; Russian: Колодищанский сельсовет) is a lower-level subdivision (selsoviet) of Minsk district, Minsk region, Belarus. Its administrative center is the agrotown of Kalodzishchy.

== Rural localities ==
The populations are from the 2009 Belarusian census (14,556 total) and 2019 Belarusian census (24,112 total)

Russian name	Belarusian name	Pop. 2009	Pop. 2019
д Глебковичи	в Глебкавічы	121	207
п Городище	п Гарадзішча	1129	764
д Дубровка	в Дубраўка	44	43
аг Колодищи (Kolodishchi)	аг Калодзішчы (Kalodzishchy)	11445	20405
д Липовая Колода	в Ліпавая Калода	26	128
д Старина	в Старына	392	605
п Сухорукие	п Сухарукія	832	832
д Юхновка	в Юхнаўка	567	1128
