= Maleyki rural council =

Maleyki rural council (Belarusian: Малейкаўскі сельсавет, Russian: Малейковский сельсовет) is a lower-level subdivision (selsoviet) of Brahin district, Gomel region, Belarus. Its capital is the village of Maleyki. According to the 2019 Belarus census, its population was 820.
