= Chamyarysy rural council =

Subdivision of Gomel region, Belarus

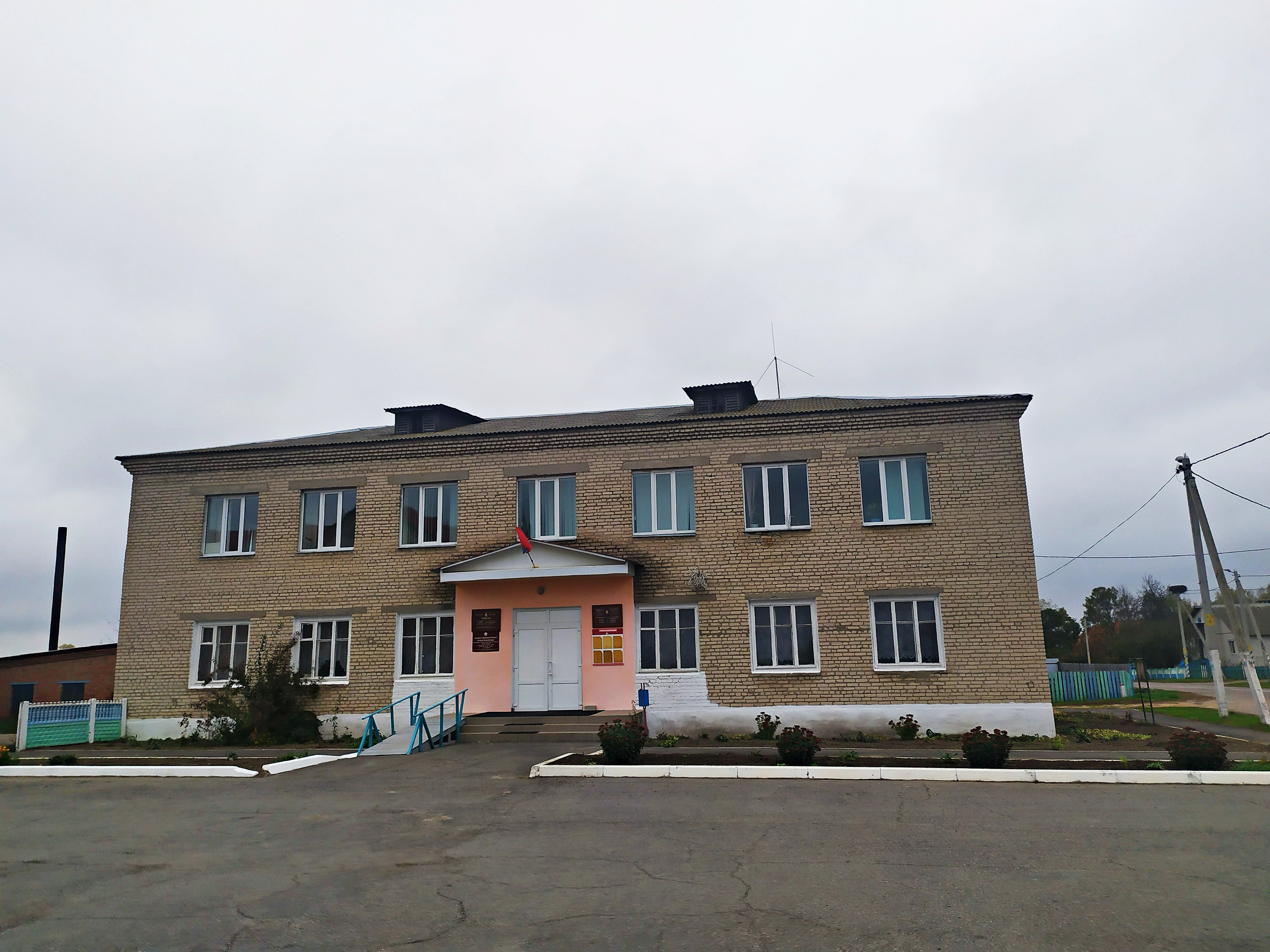
Chamyarysy rural council seat

Chamyarysy rural council (Belarusian: Чемерисский сельсавет, Russian: Маложинский сельсовет) is a lower-level subdivision (selsoviet) of Brahin district, Gomel region, Belarus. Its capital is the agrotown of Chamyarysy. According to the 2019 Belarus census, its population was 914.
