= Burki rural council =

Burki rural council (Belarusian: Буркоўскі сельсавет, Russian: Бурковский сельсовет) is a lower-level subdivision (selsoviet) of Brahin district, Gomel region, Belarus. Its capital is the agrotown of Burki. According to the 2019 Belarus census, its population was 1,034.
