= Barawlyany rural council =

Barawlyany rural council (Belarusian: Бараўлянскі сельсавет) may refer to:

- Barawlyany, Minsk district rural council
- Barawlyany, Vitebsk district rural council
