= Stulhi =

Village in Belarus

Coordinates: 54°20′49″N 25°44′12″E

Stulhi (Belarusian: Стульгі, Russian: Стульги, Polish: Stulgi, Lithuanian: Stulgiai) is a village in Krayvantsy selsoviet, Ashmyany district, Grodno region, Belarus.

By the 2009 Belarus census, its population was 6. By the 2019 Belarus census, its population was 4.

The village is in the Belarus-Lithuanian border area.

== History ==
When in Russian Partition of Poland, the village was in Graužiškės gmina, Oszmiany powiat, Vilna Governorate, Russian Empire. It also belonged to the interwar Poland.

During 1940-1954 it was the administrative center of the Stulhi rural council.
