= Stulgiai =

Stulgiai is the name of several rural locations in Lithuania. It may refer to:

- Stulgiai (Jurbarkas), Jurbarkas district
- Stulgiai (Kelmė), Kelmė district
- Stulgiai (Tytuvėnai), Kelmė district
- Stulgiai (Šakiai), Šakiai district

== See also ==
- Stulgiai is the Lithuanian name of Stulhi/Stulgi, formerly Lithuanian village in Belarus
