= Lyasny, Minsk region =

Agrotown in Minsk Region, Belarus

Lyasny Лясны (Belarusian) Лесной (Russian)
- Agrotown
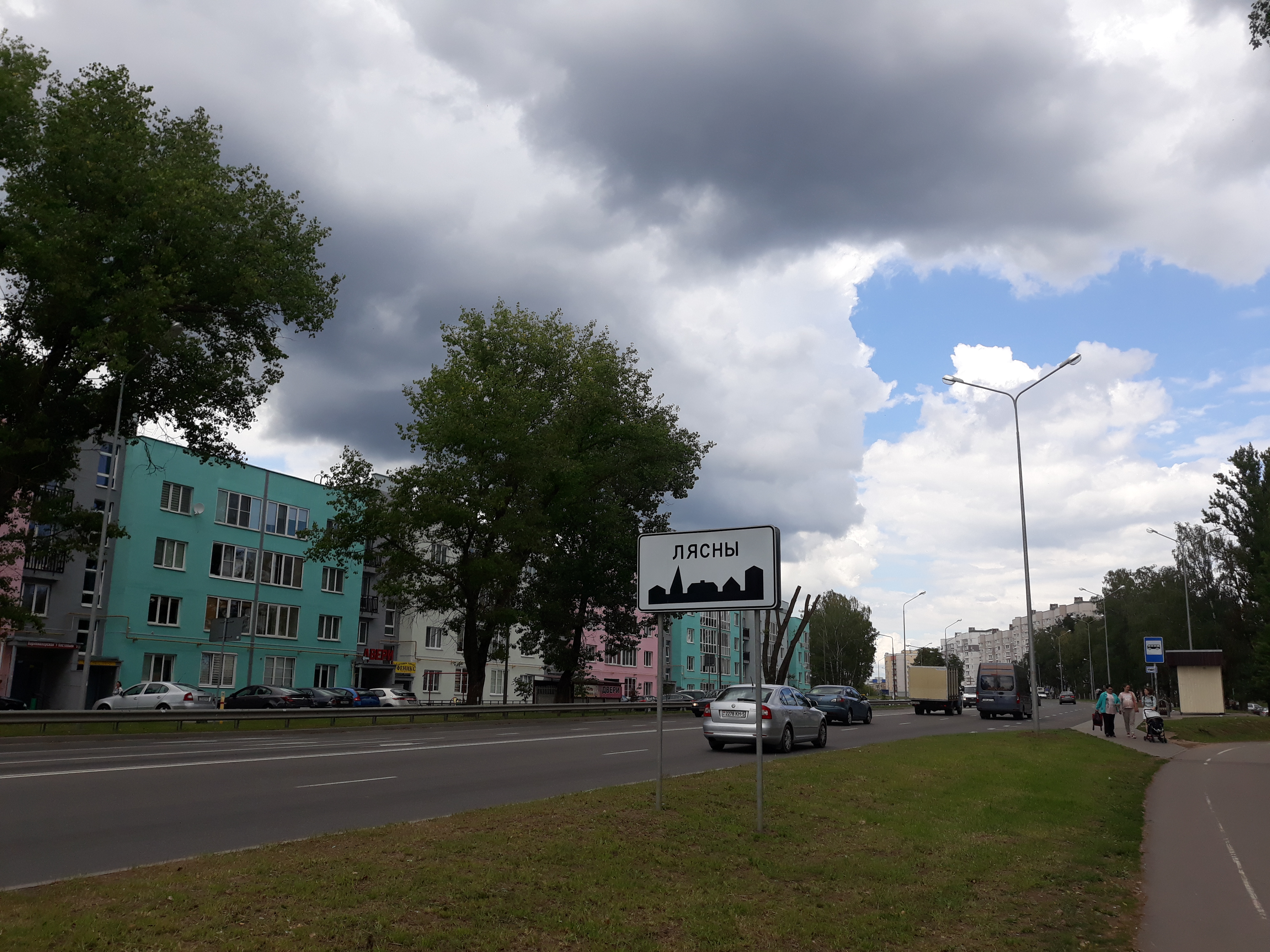

- Location within Belarus
- Coordinates: 54°00′16″N 27°41′05″E
- Country: Belarus
- Region: Minsk Region
- District: Minsk District

Population (2023)
  - Total: 21,638
- Time zone: UTC+3 (MSK)

Lyasny (Belarusian: Лясны, romanized: Liasny; Russian: Лесной, romanized: Lesnoy) is an agrotown in Minsk District, Minsk Region, Belarus. It serves as the administrative center of Barawlyany rural council. It is located north of the capital Minsk, 14 kilometres (8.7 mi) from its center and about six kilometres (3.7 mi) from the Minsk Ring Road (the approximate boundary of Minsk). In 1999, it had a population of 8,350. As of 2023, it has a population of 21,638.

== History ==
It received the status of agrotown in 2010 according to the "State program for the revival and development of rural areas, for years 2005–2010".

In 2021, Belarusian president Alexander Lukashenko suggested to merge Lyasny and the neighboring village of Barawlyany, together with two other adjacent settlements, Vopytny settlement and Lyeskawka village, into a city with a population of about 70,000, but soon the idea was abandoned.
