= Vopytny =

Settlement in Minsk Region, Belarus

Vopytny Вопытны (Belarusian) Опытный (Russian)
- Settlement
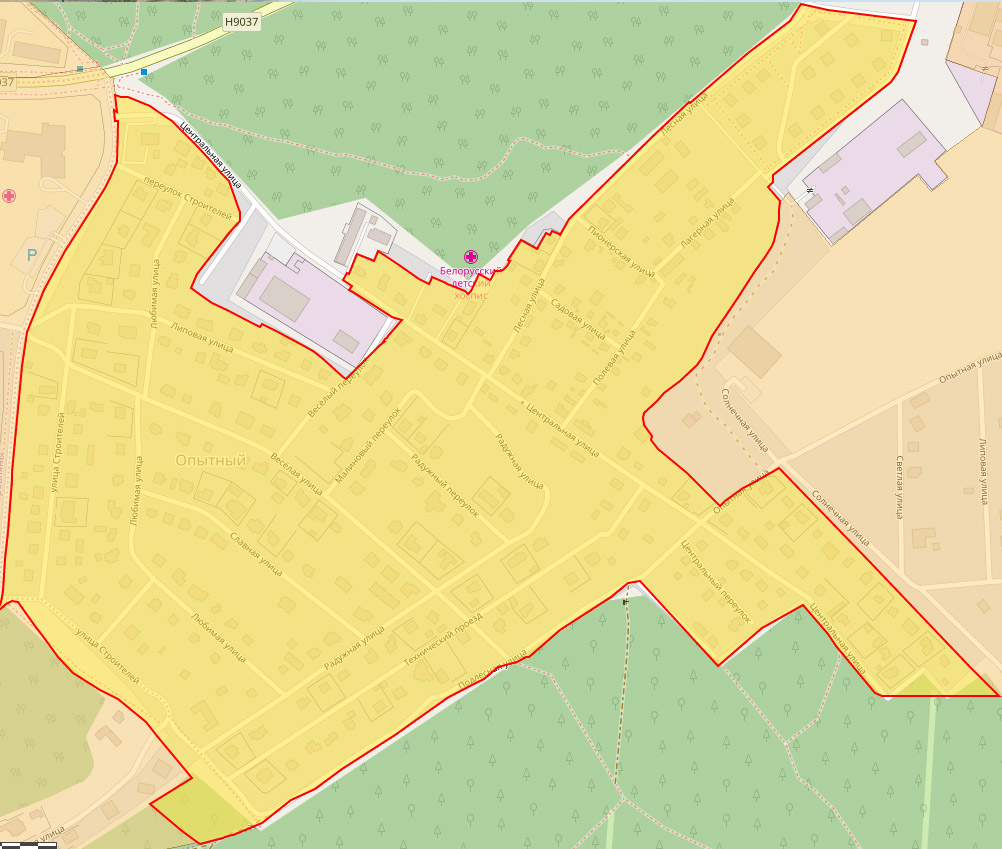
- Map of Vopytny

- Location within Belarus
- Coordinates: 53°59′38″N 27°41′58″E
- Country: Belarus
- Region: Minsk Region
- District: Minsk District

Population (2010)
  - Total: 368
- Time zone: UTC+3 (MSK)

Vopytny (Belarusian: Вопытны; Russian: Опытный, romanized: Opytny) is a settlement in Minsk District, Minsk Region, Belarus. It is administratively part of Barawlyany rural council. It is located about seven kilometres (4.3 mi) from the Minsk Ring Road, north of the capital Minsk. In 2010, it had a population of 368.

== History ==
In 2021, Belarusian president Alexander Lukashenko suggested to merge Vopytny with the neighboring settlements of Barawlyany, Lyasny, and Lyeskawka into a city with a population of about 70,000, but soon the idea was abandoned.
