= Rezgiukai =

- Village
- Location in Lithuania Rezgiukai (Lithuania)
- Coordinates: 55°25′56″N 23°39′12″E
- Country: Lithuania
- County: Kaunas County
- Municipality: Kėdainiai district municipality
- Eldership: Krakės Eldership

Population (2011)
  - Total: 0
- Time zone: UTC+2 (EET)
  - Summer (DST): UTC+3 (EEST)

Rezgiukai (formerly Polish: Rezgiuki, Rezginki) is a village in Kėdainiai district municipality, in Kaunas County, in central Lithuania. According to the 2011 census, the village was uninhabited. It is located 6 kilometres (3.7 mi) from Krakės, by the Šušvė river.

== History ==
At the end of the 19th century there were two Rezgiukai zaścianki, one of them belonged to the Jelenskiai, another to the Gailiavičiai.

== Demography ==
Historical population

Year	Pop.	±% p.a.
1923	18	—
1959	39	+2.17%
1970	7	−14.46%
1979	0	−100.00%

Year	Pop.	±% p.a.
1989	0	0.00%
2001	0	0.00%
2011	0	0.00%

Source: 1902, 1923, 1959 & 1970, 1979, 1989, 2001, 2011
