= Patskau =

Pаtskаu
- Пацкаў; Пацков
- Location within Belarus
- Coordinates: 51°47′N 30°17′E
- Country: Belarus
- Voblast: Homiel Voblast

Population
  - Total: 0
- Time zone: UTC+2 (EET)
  - Summer (DST): UTC+3 (EEST)

Pа́tskаu (Belarusian: Пацкаў; Russian: Пацков) — khutor in Belarus, in Brahin Raion of Gomel Region. Was included in Malojinsky selsoviet.

Patskov was excluded from the list of settlements according to decision of Gomelsky oblast government dated of 17 November 2005 № 793.
