= Saviečiai =

- Village
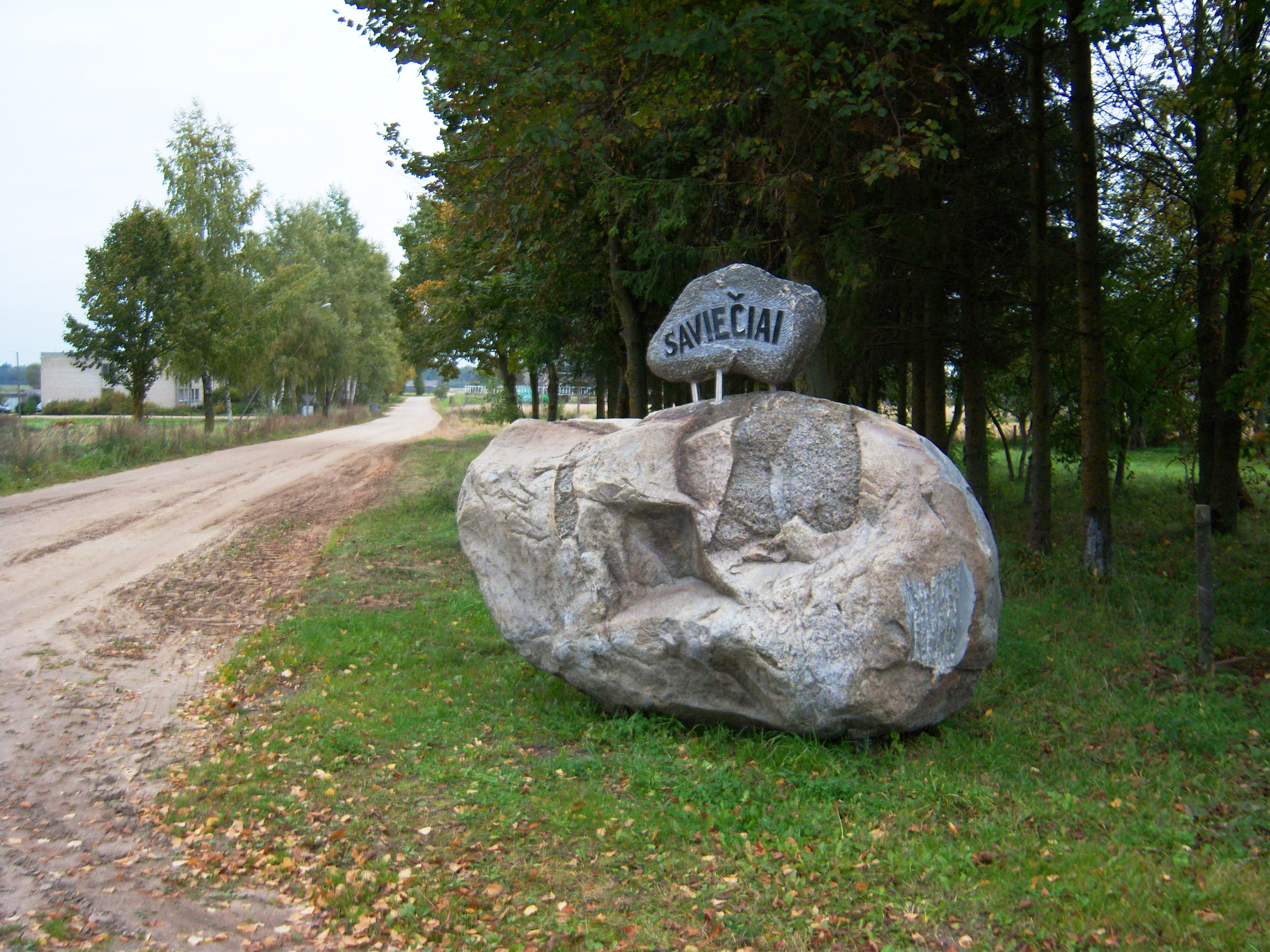

- Location in Lithuania Saviečiai (Lithuania)
- Coordinates: 55°10′19″N 24°00′22″E
- Country: Lithuania
- County: Kaunas County
- Municipality: Kėdainiai district municipality
- Eldership: Pelėdnagiai Eldership

Population (2011)
  - Total: 141
- Time zone: UTC+2 (EET)
  - Summer (DST): UTC+3 (EEST)

Saviečiai (formerly Russian: Савечаны, Polish: Saweczany, Sawieczany) is a village in Kėdainiai district municipality, in Kaunas County, in central Lithuania. According to the 2011 census, the village had a population of 141 people. It is located 6 kilometres (3.7 mi) from Vandžiogala, by the Mėkla river, alongside the A8 highway. There is a cemetery.

== History ==
At the beginning of the 20th century, Saviečiai was an okolica.

During the Soviet era, Saviečiai was a subsidiary settlement of the "Spike" kolkhoz.

== Demography ==
Historical population

Year	Pop.	±% p.a.
1798	29	—
1902	188	+1.81%
1923	213	+0.60%
1959	210	−0.04%
1970	170	−1.90%

Year	Pop.	±% p.a.
1979	269	+5.23%
1986	197	−4.35%
1989	180	−2.96%
2001	187	+0.32%
2011	141	−2.78%

Source: 1902, 1923, 1959 & 1970, 1979, 1989, 2001, 2011
