= Kalodzishchy =

Agrotown in Minsk Region, Belarus

Kalodzishchy Калодзішчы (Belarusian) Колодищи (Russian)
- Agrotown
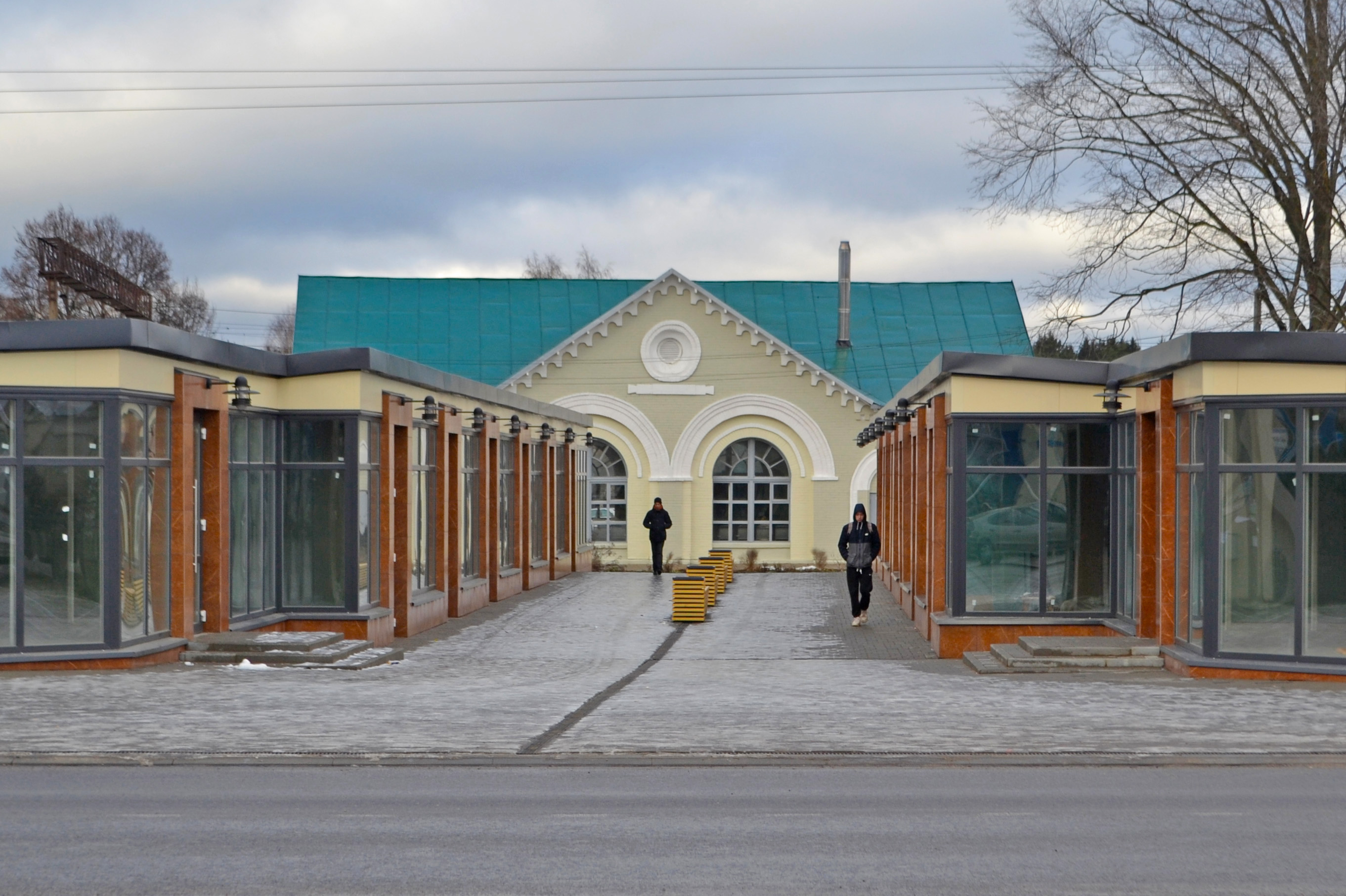

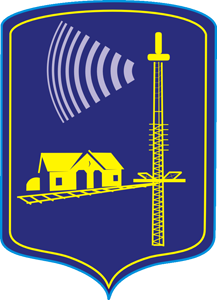
- Coat of arms

- Location within Belarus
- Coordinates: 53°57′03″N 27°47′10″E
- Country: Belarus
- Region: Minsk Region
- District: Minsk District

Population (2023)
  - Total: 19,898
- Time zone: UTC+3 (MSK)

Kalodzishchy (Belarusian: Калодзішчы, romanized: Kalodziščy; Russian: Колодишчи, romanized: Kolodishchi) is an agrotown in Minsk District, Minsk Region, Belarus. It serves as the administrative center of Kalodzishchy rural council. As of 2023, it has a population of 19,898.

== History ==
Kołodziszcze, as it was known in Polish, was a zaścianek. Following the Second Partition of Poland (1793), it was annexed by Russia.

On 31 October 2023, an explosion was reported at a military base near Kalodzishchy. The Ministry of Defence claimed that the explosion had been deliberately orchestrated.
