= Zaścianek =

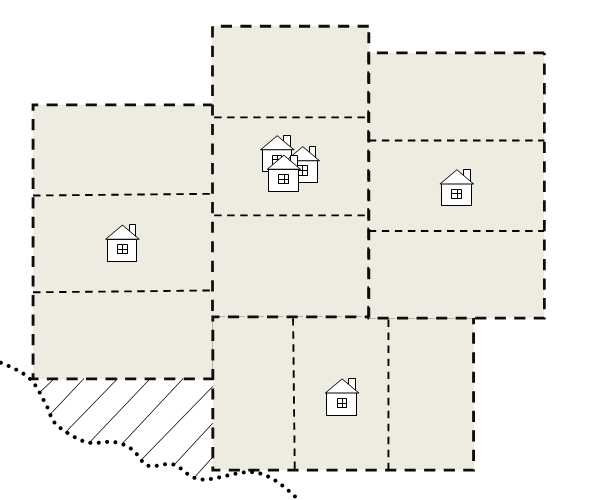
A sketch of land by the Volok Reform: the hatched area is "beyond the wall", i.e., a zaścianek

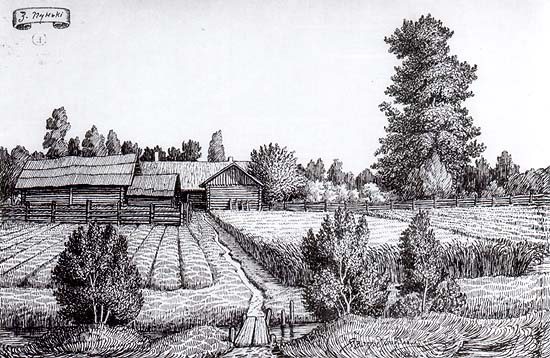
Zaścianek Punki. Jazep Drazdovič, 1922

Zaścianek (Polish: [zaˈɕt͡ɕa.nɛk], literally: "[place] beyond the wall") was historically a village or a part of a village where petty nobility (drobna szlachta) lived, who did not own peasants and cultivated their land by the hands of their own family. The derived adjective zaściankowy may mean "unsophisticated", "narrow-minded", or "out-of-the-way" and the word itself may be used in the meaning "backwater place".

In historical Poland the term referred to the undistributed land in nonconvenient places, usually separated from the arable land by some natural boundaries: forest, swamp, etc. Peasants were allowed to ameliorate these lands and rent it from the landowner.

Many settlements of this type arose in Grand Duchy of Lithuania as a result of the 16th century Volok Reform when the state land was consolidated and redistributed in a uniform way. The parts of the land outside the standard plots was placed into common use or leased, e.g., for manors of petty nobility.In the latter case a more specific term was used: zaścianek szlachecki ("szlachta" zaścianek). Accordingly, the term szlachta zaściankowa (or, more "polite", szlachta zagrodowa (see Association of Szlachta Zagrodowa)) referred to landless szlachta who rented the land, and by extension to petty szlachta.

Examles of former zaściankis include:

- Giełny
- Kołodziszcze, now agrotown
- Rezgiuki

== See also ==
- Khutor
- Barefoot szlachta
