= Mėkla =

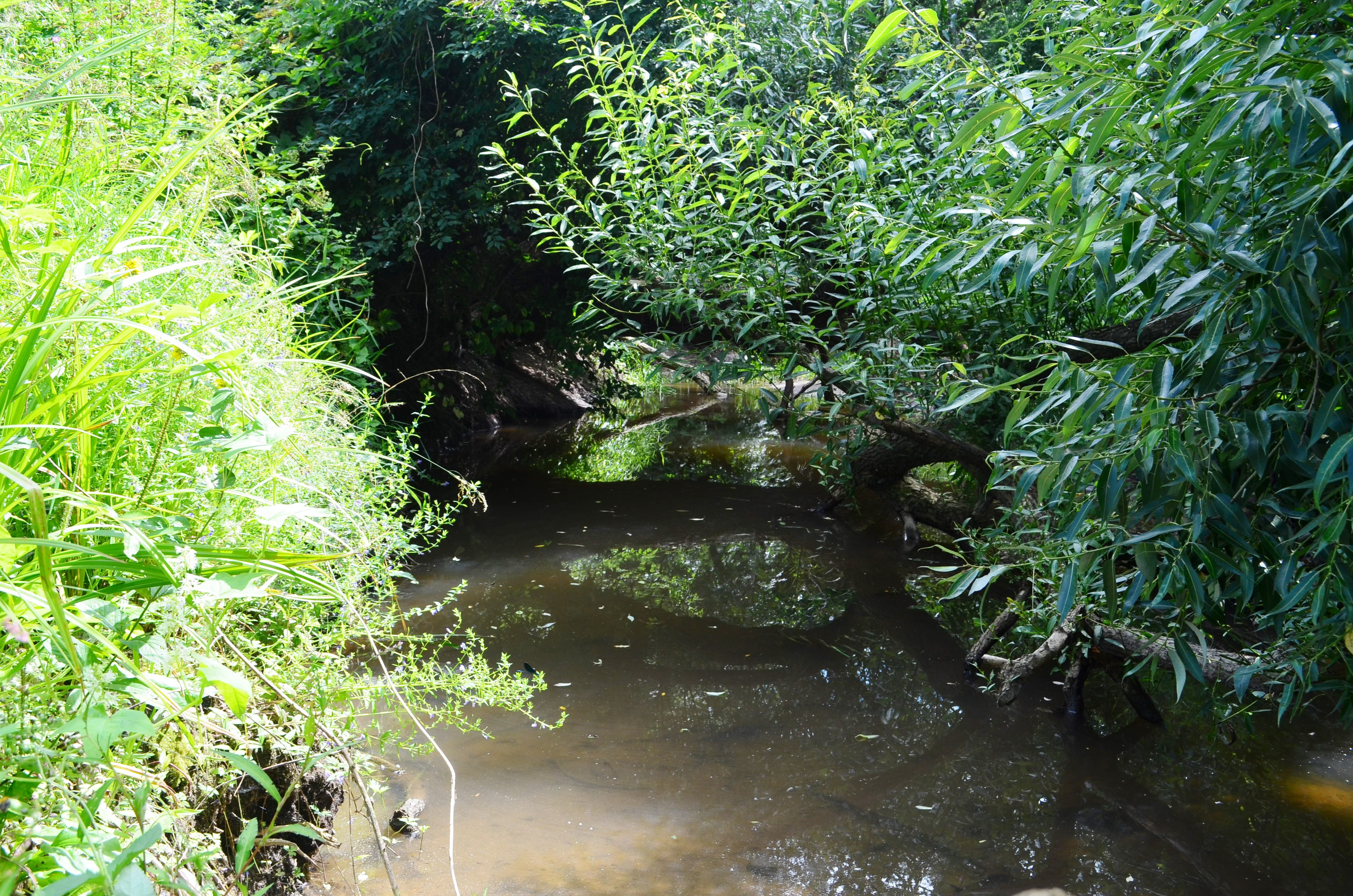
- The lower course of the Mėkla nearby Žiogaičiai

Location
- Country: Lithuania
- Region: Kaunas County

Physical characteristics
- Source
  - location: Jonava District Municipality, nearby Preišiogala
- Mouth: Barupė (Labūnava Reservoir) in Pamėkliai
  - coordinates: 55.187°N 23.936°E
- Length: 26.9 km (16.7 mi)
- Basin size: 93.3 km^{2} (36.0 sq mi)
- Discharge
  - average: 0.4 m³/s

Basin features
- Progression: Barupė→ Nevėžis→ Neman→ Baltic Sea
- Tributaries
  - right: Klampis, Varnaližis, Vadavė

The Mėkla is a river of Kaunas County, central Lithuania. It flows for 27 kilometres and has a basin area of 93 km^{2}. It is a left tributary of the Barupė.

The Mėkla river starts nearby Preišiogala, in Jonava District Municipality. It flows towards north western direction through Kaunas District Municipality and Kėdainiai District Municipality, then empties into the Labūnava Reservoir on the Barupė river next to Pamėkliai village.

Preišiogala, Puikoniai, Gelnai, Saviečiai, Pamėkliai villages are located on the shores of the Mėkla.

The hydronym probably derives from Lithuanian words mėkla ('dummy') and pamėklė, pamėkla ('phantom, ghost, spook').
