= Julija Cimafiejeva =

Belarusian poet and translator (born 1982)

- Юлія Цімафеева
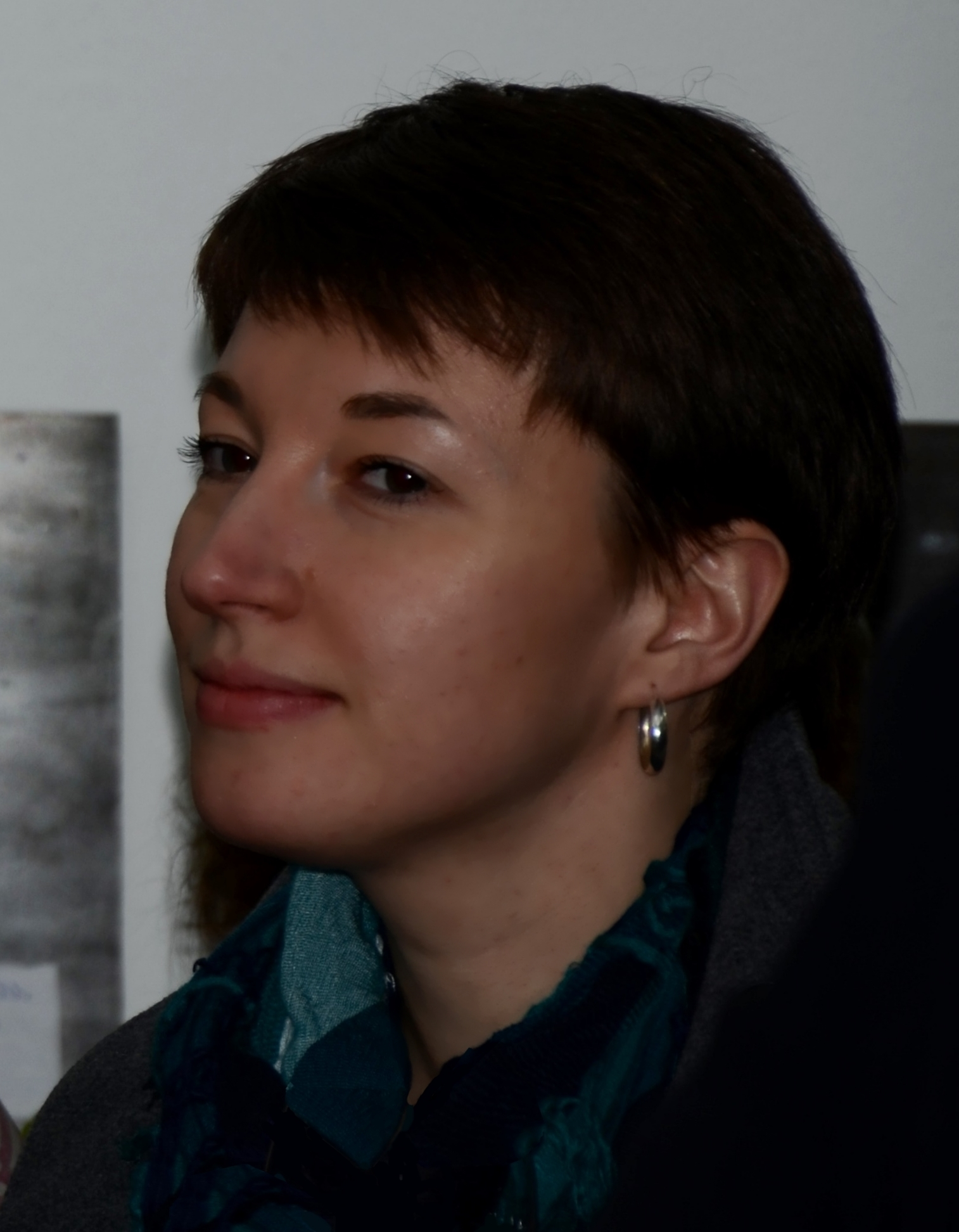
- Born: January 12, 1982 (age 44); Śpiaryžža (Сьпярыжжа), Brahin District, Homel Region, Belarus
- Education: Minsk State Linguistic University
- Occupations: Poet, translator
- Spouse: Alhierd Bacharevič (2013-present)
- Writing career
- Language: Belarusian
- Years active: 2013–present

Julia Cimafiejeva (Belarusian: Юлія Цімафеева, born on 12 January 1982 in the village of Śpiaryžža (Сьпярыжжа), (in Brahin District, Homel Region) is a Belarusian poet and translator from English and other languages. She graduated from the Department of English at Minsk State Linguistic University and from the Belarusian College. She is one of the founders and editors of the online magazine of translated literature PrajdziSviet ('Pass the World'). Cimafiejeva is a member of the Belarusian PEN Center and of the Union of Belarusian Authors.

== Books ==
- 2014 Кніга памылак. Вершы і пераклады Kniha pamyłak. Veršy i perakłady [A Book of Errors: Poems and Translations]. Minsk: Halijafy. ISBN 978-985-7021-66-6.
- 2016 Цырк. Вершы Cyrk. Вершы [Circus: Poems]. Minsk: Зміцер Колас Zimcier Kołas. 72 pp. ISBN 9789857164257.
  - Polish translation: Julia Cimafiejewa. 2018. Cyrk i inne wiersze / Цырк і іншыя вершы [Circus and Other Poems] [translated from the Belarusian by Bohdan Zadura] (Ser: Wschodni Express). Lublin: Warsztaty Kultury, 128 pp. ISBN 9788364375293. NB: A bilingual edition.
  - Ukrainian translation (fragments): Юлія Петрівна Тимофєєва Yuliya Petrivna Tymofyeyeva. 2019. Вірші Юлі Цімафєєвої в перекладах українською Virshi Yuli Tsimafyeyevoyi v perekladakh ukrayinsʹkoyu [Poems by Julija Cimafiejeva translated into Ukrainian] [translated from the Belarusian into Ukrainian by Ія Ківа (Iya Kiva)]. 2019. Litcentr. 16 Apr.
  - German translation: Julia Cimafiejeva. 2020. Zirkus. Gedichte [Circus: Poems] [translated from the Belarusian by Thomas Weiler and Tina Wünschmann]. Berlin: edition.fotoTAPETA, 96 pp.
- 2020 ROT. Вершы ROT. Veršy [ROT: Poems]. Minsk: Янушкевіч Januškievič and Prague: Vesna Vaško, 84 pp. ISBN 978-80-907359-3-4 (Vesna Vaško) ISBN 978-985-7210-57-2 (А. М. Янушкевіч)
- 2020 Days in Miensk: A Diary, a diary on the 2020 Peaceful White Revolution in Belarus
  - Swedish translation: Julia Tsimafejeva. 2020. Dagar i Belarus [Days in Belarus] [translated from the English by Ida Börjel]. Stockholm: Norstedts, 88 pp. ISBN 978-91-1-311651-8.
  - German translation: Julia Cimafiejeva. 2021. Minsk. Tagebuch [Minsk: A Diary] [translated from the English by Andreas Rostek]. Berlin: edition.fotoTAPETA, 128 pp. ISBN 978-3-949262-04-3.
  - Dutch translation: Julia Cimafiejeva. 2022. Dagen in Minsk, dagboek van een opstand [Days in Minsk, diary of an uprising] [translated from the English by Henny Corver]. Amsterdam: Atlas Contact, 136 pp. ISBN 978-9045046235.
- 2022 Der Angststein. Gedichte [The Stone of Fear: Poems]. [translated from the Belarusian by Tina Wünschmann, Thomas Weiler, Uljana Wolf and Lydia Nagel]. Berlin: edition.fotoTAPETA, 104 pp. ISBN 978-3949262203
- 2022 Minsk. Die Stadt, die ich vermisse. Fotografie Gedichte [Minsk. The city I have missed. Photography. Poems]. [translated from the Belarusian and English by Tina Wünschmann, Thomas Weiler and Georgia Rauer]. Berlin: Edition frölich, 104 pp. ISBN 978-3-9824450-1-4
- 2022 Motherfield: Poems & Belarusian Protest Diary. [translated from the Belarusian by Valzhyna Mort and Hanif Abdurraqib]. Dallas: Deep Vellum, 280 pp. ISBN 978-1646052257
- 2022 Воўчыя ягады. Вершы Voŭčyja Jahady. Veršy [Bogberries: Poems]. Prague: Vesna Vaško, 102 pp. ISBN 978-80-907359-6-5 (Vesna Vaško)

== Cimafiejeva's translations ==
- 2018 Стыян Холе Stian Hole. Лета Гармана Lieta Harmana [Garmann's Summer]. Minsk: Янушкевіч Januškievič, 44 pp. ISBN 978-985-7165-79-7
- 2018 Ўолт Ўітмэн Walt Whitman. Выбраная паэзія Vybranaja paezija [Selected Poetry] (Ser: Паэты планеты). Minsk: Зміцер Колас Zimcier Kołas, 96 pp. ISBN 978-985-23-0026-1
- 2019 Энхедуанна Enheduanna. Сакральная паэзія: з шумерскай Sakrałnaja paezija: z šumierskaj [Sacred Poetry: Translated from the Sumerian]. Minsk: Зміцер Колас Zimcier Kołas. 74 pp. ISBN 978-985-23-0079-7 (NB: Co-translator: Леанід Баршчэўскі Lieanid Barščeŭski).
- 2020 Мередит Артур Meredith Arthur. Вон из моей головы! : как избавиться от тревоги и найти вдохновение Von iz moyey golovy! : kak izbavit'sya ot trevogi i nayti vdokhnoveniye [Get out of my head: inspiration for overthinkers in an anxious world]. Minsk: Попурри Popurri, 112 pp. ISBN 978-985-15-4682-0.
- 2020 Стывен Крэйн Stephen Crane. Выбраныя вершы Vybranyja veršy [Selected Poems] (Ser: Паэты планеты). Minsk: Зміцер Колас Zimcier Kołas, 84 pp. ISBN 978-985-23-0099-5
- 2020 Мая Лундэ Maja Lunde. Снежная сястра: калядная гісторыя Sniežnaja siastra: kaliadnaja historyja [Snow Sister: A Christmas Story]. Minsk: Янушкевіч Januškievič, 192 pp. ISBN 978-985-7210-67-1
- 2020 Стыян Холе Stian Hole. Неба Ганны Nieba Hanny [Hanna's Heaven]. Minsk: Янушкевіч Januškievič, 40 pp. ISBN 978-985-90541-3-6
- 2020 Лиза Робертс Lisa Roberts. Научите ребенка медитации: 70 простых и веселых упражнений, которые помогут детям снять стресс и расслабиться Nauchite rebenka meditatsii: 70 prostykh i veselykh uprazhneniy, kotoryye pomogut detyam snyat' stress i rasslabit'sya [Teach Your Child Meditation: 70+ Fun & Easy Ways to Help Kids De-Stress and Chill Out]. Minsk: Попурри Popurri, 190 pp. ISBN 978-985-15-4397-3
