= Kamaryn =

Kamaryn Камарын (Belarusian)
- Urban-type settlement
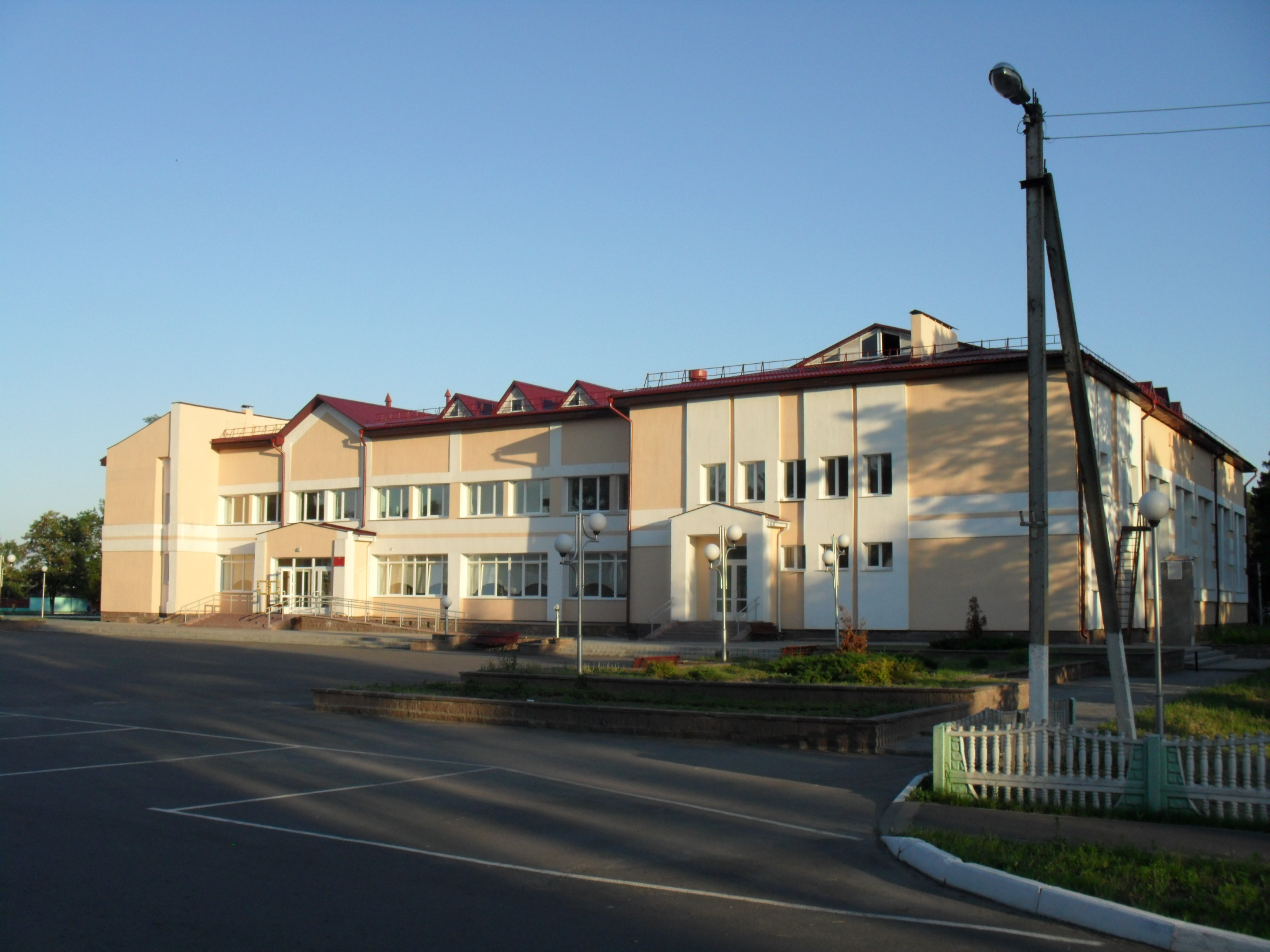

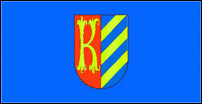
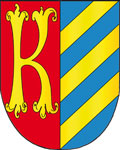
- Flag Coat of arms

- Location in Belarus
- Coordinates: 51°26′15″N 30°34′10″E
- Country: Belarus
- Region: Gomel Region
- District: Brahin District

Population (2025)
  - Total: 2,022
- Time zone: UTC+3 (MSK)

Kamaryn (Belarusian: Камарын; Russian: Комарин, romanized: Komarin) is an urban-type settlement in Brahin District, Gomel Region, Belarus. It is located near the town of Pripyat in Ukraine. As of 2025, it has a population of 2,022. It is the center of the Kamaryn rural council.

== Geography ==
Kamaryn is on the Dnieper at the edge of a forest, near the southernmost tip of Belarus.
