= Barawlyany, Minsk district rural council =

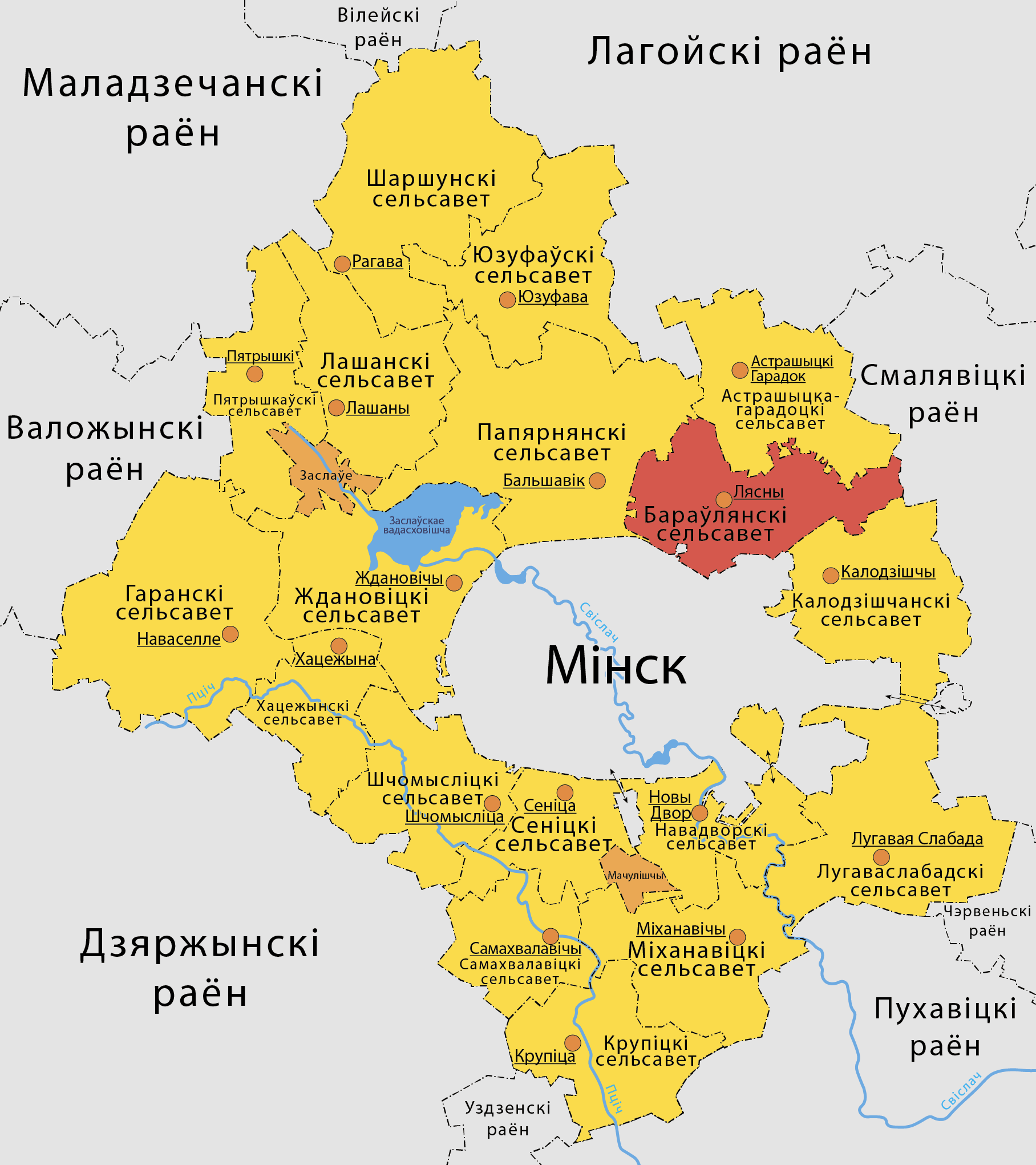
Map of Minsk District

Barawlyany rural council (Belarusian: Бараўлянскі сельсавет; Russian: Боровлянский сельсовет) is a lower-level subdivision (selsoviet) of Minsk district, Minsk region, Belarus. Its administrative center is the agrotown of Lyasny.

== Rural localities ==
The populations are from the 2009 Belarusian census (25,687 total) and 2019 Belarusian census (63,147 total)

Russian name	Belarusian name	Pop. 2009	Pop. 2019
д Боровая (Borovaya)	в Баравая (Baravaya)	109	1287
д Боровляны (Borovlyany)	в Бараўляны (Barawlyany)	7339	19210
д Валерьяново	в Валяр'янава	1741	1450
д Вербицкие	в Вярбіцкія	31	32
д Дроздово	в Дроздава	515	1079
д Жуков Луг	в Жукаў Луг	110	83
д Заболотье	в Забалоцце	80	81
д Копище	в Копішча	488	11433
д Королев Стан	в Каралёў Стан	1188	1203
д Курганы	в Курганы	238	234
д Лесковка (Leskovka)	в Лескаўка (Lyeskawka)	1664	3898
аг Лесной (Lesnoy)	аг Лясны (Lyasny)	11260	21053
д Малиновка	в Малінаўка	323	312
п Опытный (Opytny)	п Вопытны (Vopytny)	349	593
д Скураты	в Скураты	31	18
д Слободщина	в Слабашчына	168	127
п Сонечный	п Сонечны	-	870
д Чертяж	в Чарцяж	53	184
