= Lyeskawka =

Village in Minsk Region, Belarus

Lyeskawka Лескаўка (Belarusian) Лесковка (Russian)
- Village
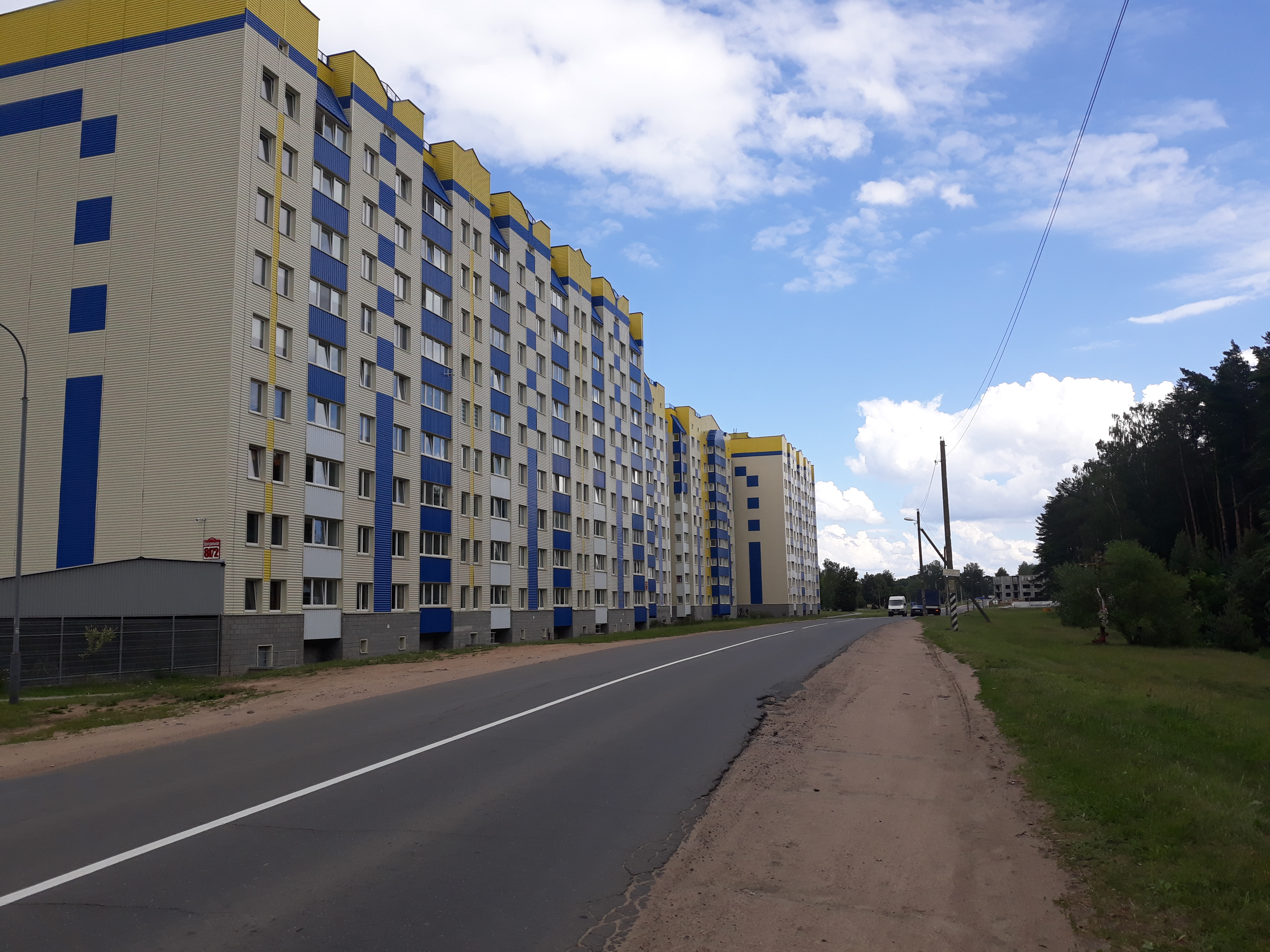

- Location within Belarus
- Coordinates: 54°00′09″N 27°42′42″E
- Country: Belarus
- Region: Minsk Region
- District: Minsk District

Population (2010)
  - Total: 1,643
- Time zone: UTC+3 (MSK)

Lyeskawka (Belarusian: Лескаўка, romanized: Lieskaŭka; Russian: Лесковка, romanized: Leskovka) is a village in Minsk District, Minsk Region, Belarus. It is administratively part of Barawlyany rural council. It is located about eight kilometres (5.0 mi) from the Minsk Ring Road, north of the capital Minsk. In 2010, it had a population of 1,643.

== History ==
In 2021, Belarusian president Alexander Lukashenko suggested to merge Lyeskawka with the neighboring settlements of Barawlyany, Lyasny, and Vopytny into a city with a population of about 70,000, but soon the idea was abandoned.
