= Žiogaičiai, Kėdainiai =

Žiogaičiai
- Village
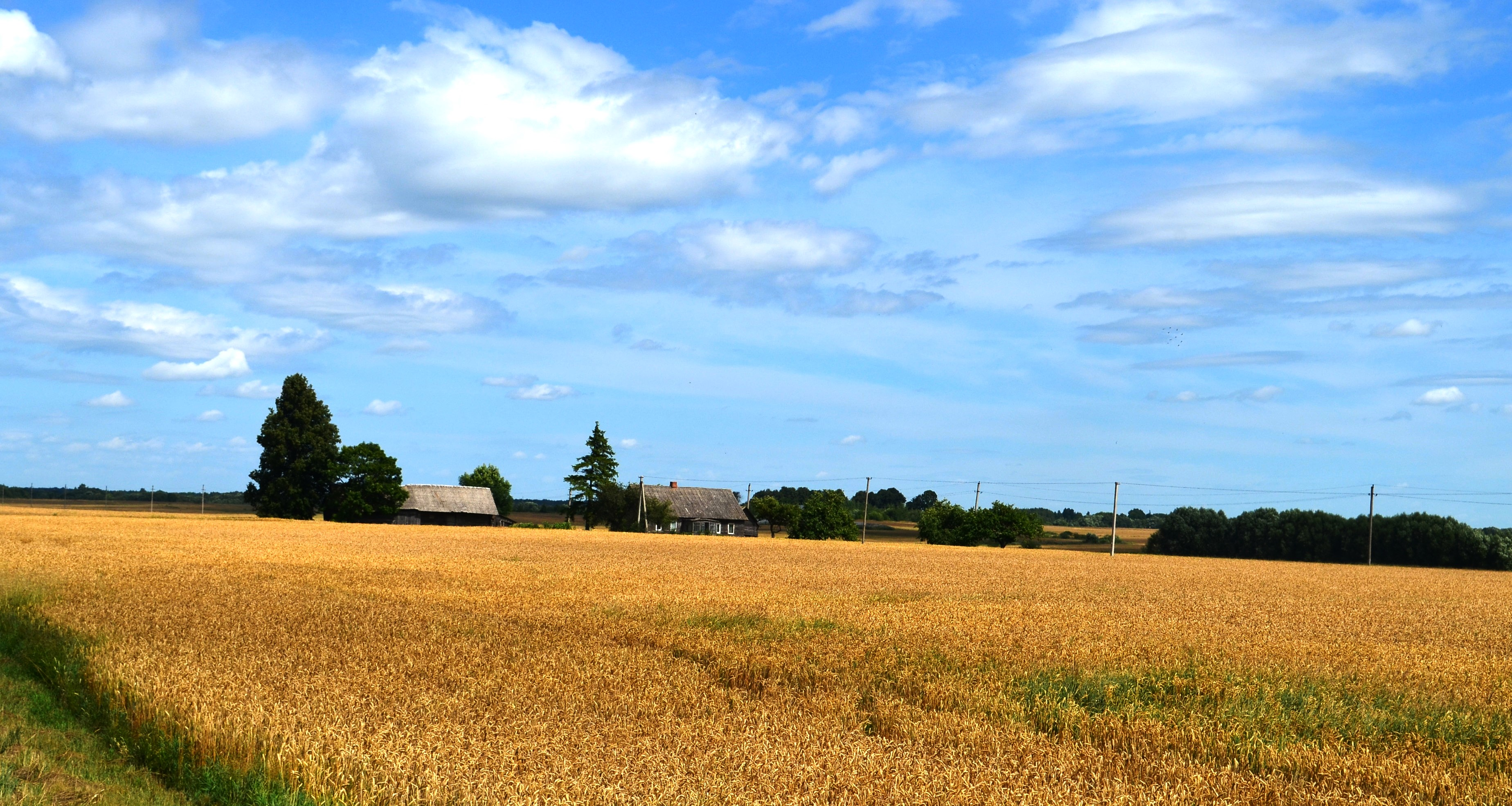

- Location in Lithuania Žiogaičiai (Lithuania)
- Coordinates: 55°10′41″N 24°01′19″E
- Country: Lithuania
- County: Kaunas County
- Municipality: Kėdainiai district municipality
- Eldership: Pelėdnagiai Eldership

Population (2011)
  - Total: 14
- Time zone: UTC+2 (EET)
  - Summer (DST): UTC+3 (EEST)

Žiogaičiai (formerly Russian: Жьогайчяй, Polish: Żygowicze) is a village in Kėdainiai district municipality, in Kaunas County, in central Lithuania. According to the 2011 census, the village had a population of 14 people. It is located 3 kilometres (1.9 mi) from Nociūnai, by the Mėkla and the Vadavė rivers, next to the A8 highway.

== Demography ==
Historical population

Year	Pop.	±% p.a.
1923	291	—
1959	119	−2.45%
1970	130	+0.81%
1979	45	−11.12%

Year	Pop.	±% p.a.
1989	18	−8.76%
2001	18	+0.00%
2011	14	−2.48%

Source: 1902, 1923, 1959 & 1970, 1979, 1989, 2001, 2011
