= Pamėkliai =

- Village
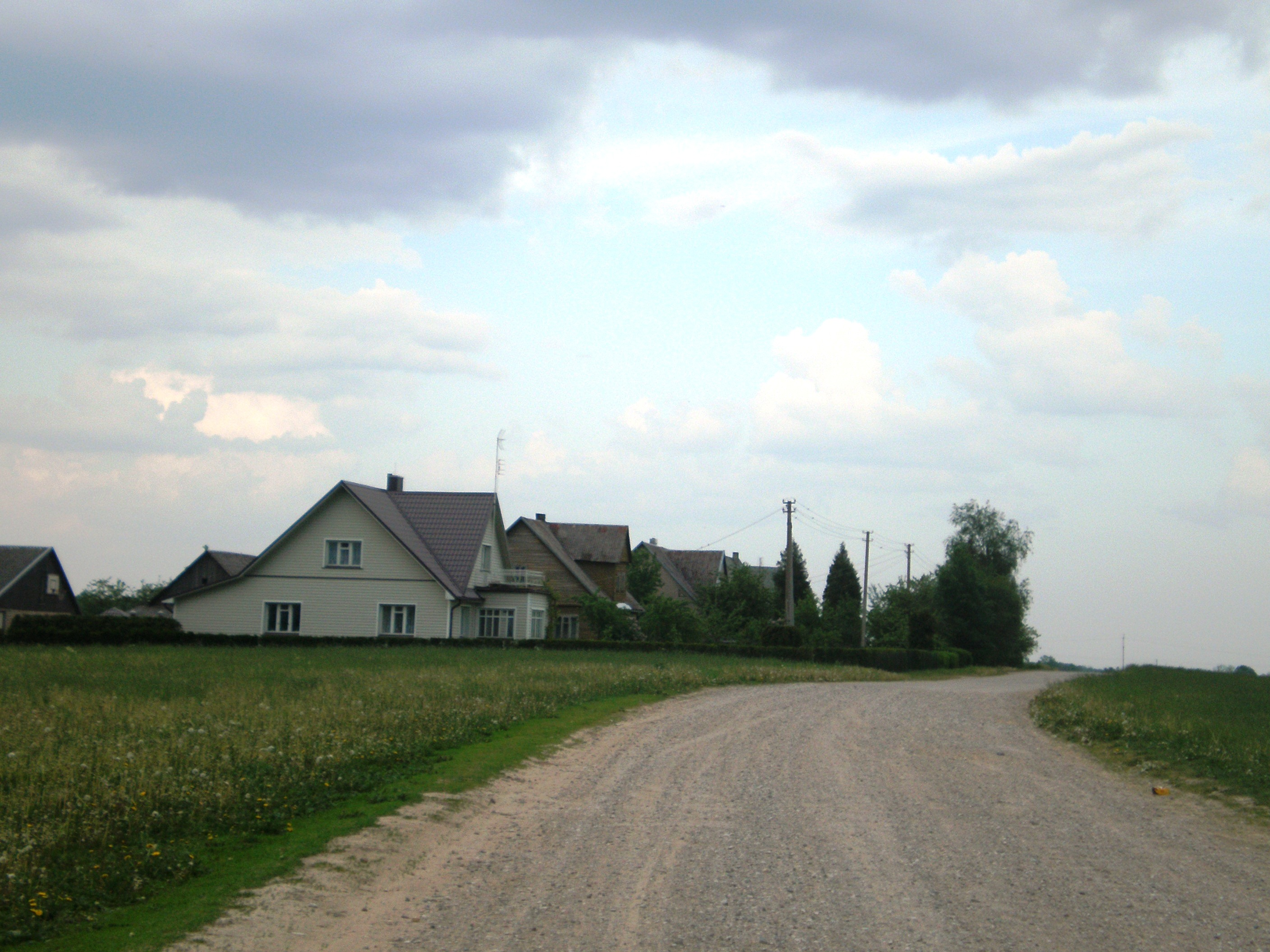

- Location in Lithuania Pamėkliai (Lithuania)
- Coordinates: 55°11′20″N 23°57′00″E
- Country: Lithuania
- County: Kaunas County
- Municipality: Kėdainiai district municipality
- Eldership: Pelėdnagiai Eldership

Population (2011)
  - Total: 42
- Time zone: UTC+2 (EET)
  - Summer (DST): UTC+3 (EEST)

Pamėkliai (formerly Russian: Помекли, Polish: Pomiekle) is a village in Kėdainiai district municipality, in Kaunas County, in central Lithuania. According to the 2011 census, the village had a population of 42 people. It is located 3 kilometres (1.9 mi) from Labūnava, by the Labūnava Reservoir (on the former confluence of the Mėkla and the Barupė).

== Demography ==
Historical population

Year	Pop.	±% p.a.
1902	51	—
1923	65	+1.16%
1959	26	−2.51%
1970	60	+7.90%

Year	Pop.	±% p.a.
1979	58	−0.38%
1989	36	−4.66%
2001	41	+1.09%
2011	42	+0.24%

Source: 1902, 1923, 1959 & 1970, 1979, 1989, 2001, 2011

== Images ==
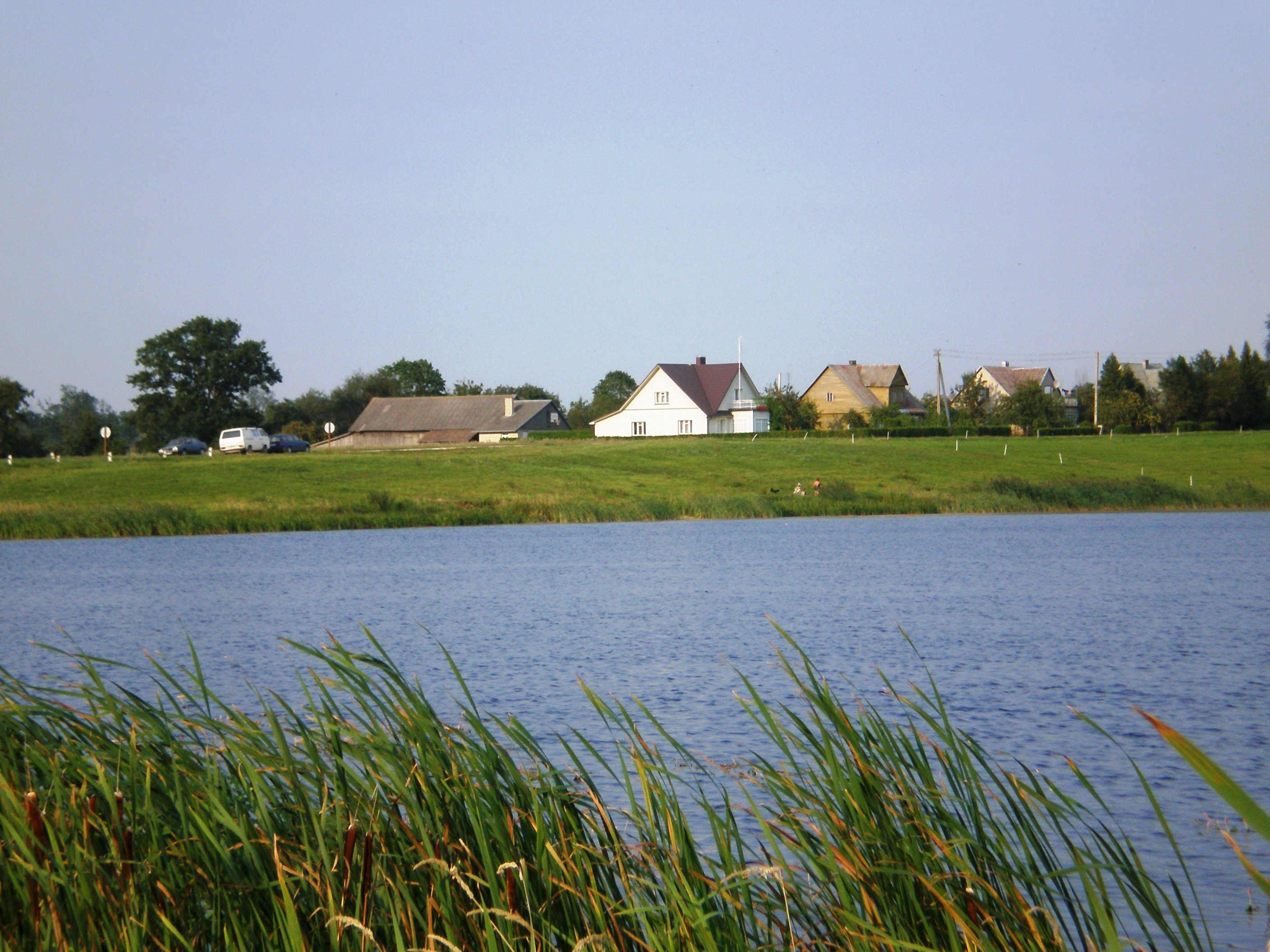
Pamėkliai and the Labūnava Reservoir

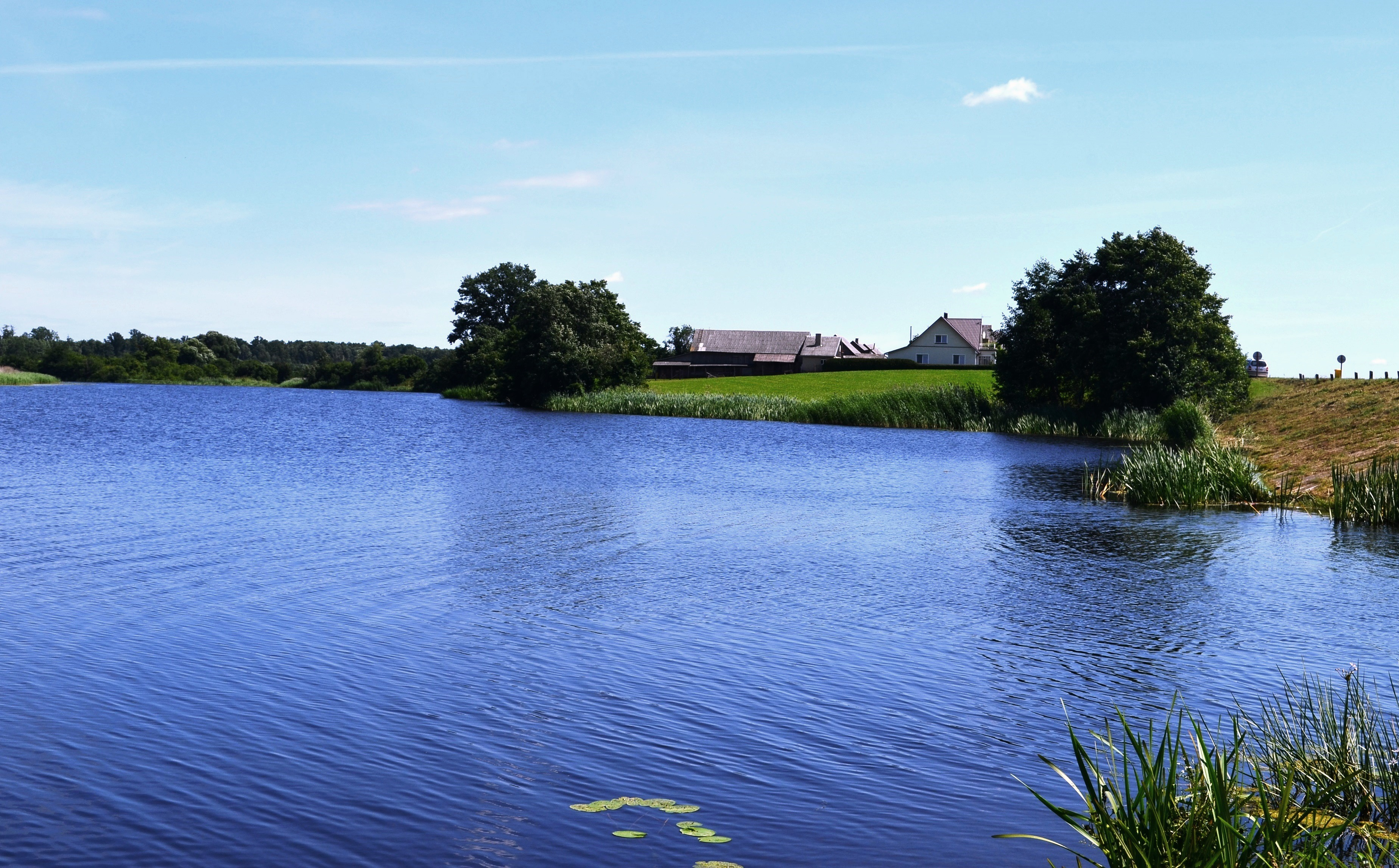
Pamėkliai and the Labūnava Reservoir

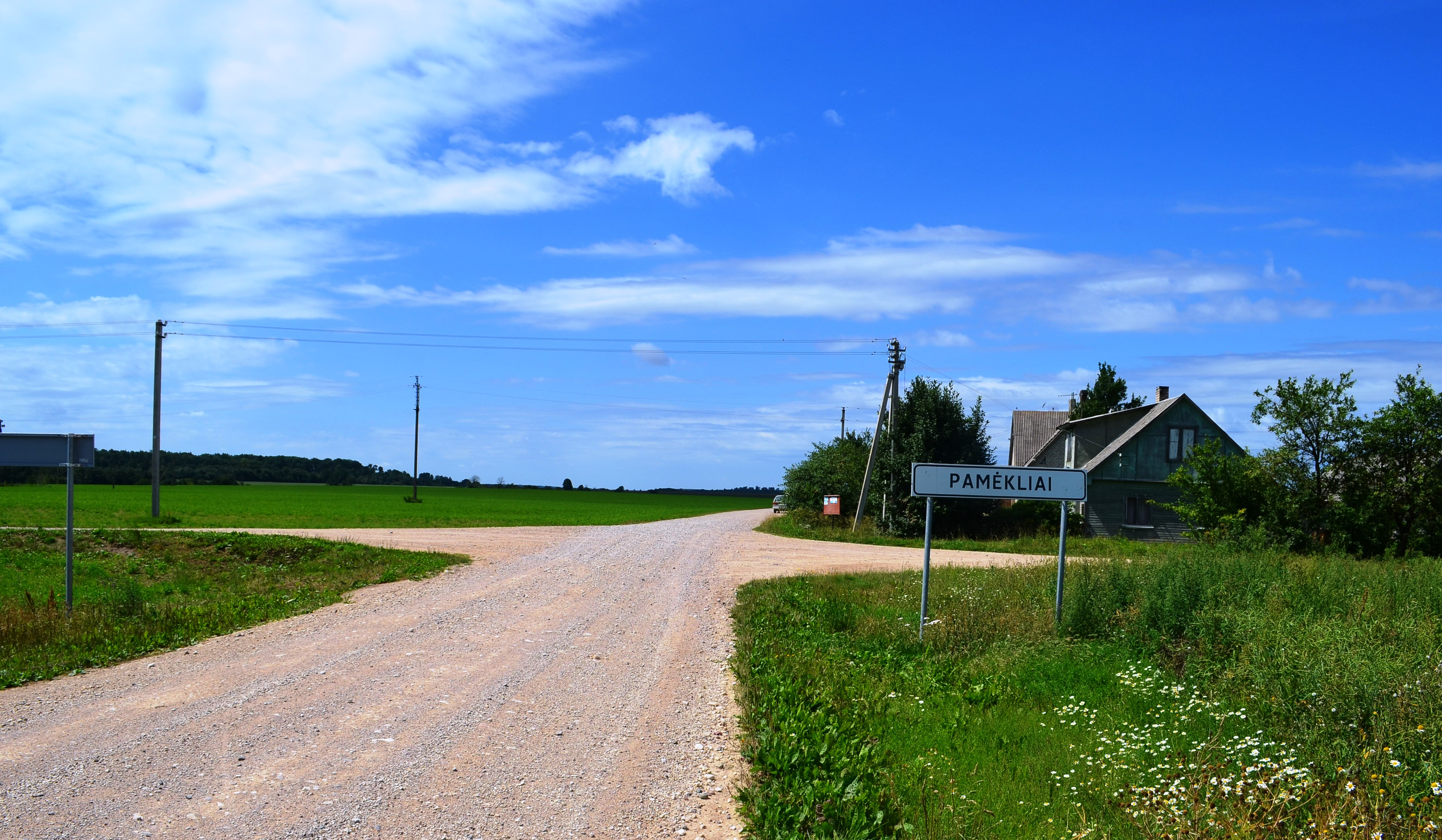
Pamėkliai from the eastern side
