= Gelnai =

- Village
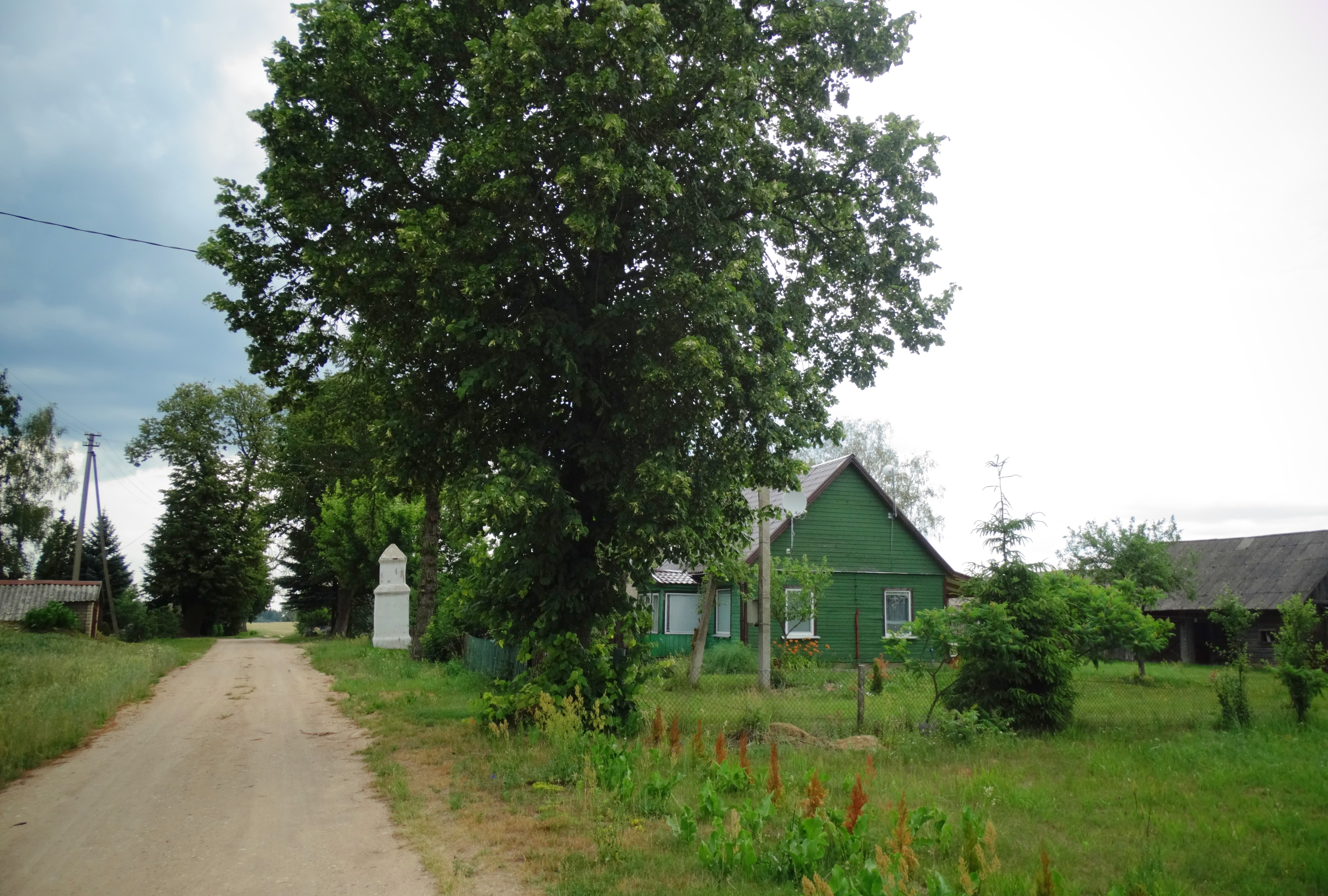

- Location in Lithuania Gelnai (Lithuania)
- Coordinates: 55°08′31″N 23°58′41″E
- Country: Lithuania
- County: Kaunas County
- Municipality: Kėdainiai district municipality
- Eldership: Pelėdnagiai Eldership

Population (2011)
  - Total: 47
- Time zone: UTC+2 (EET)
  - Summer (DST): UTC+3 (EEST)

Gelnai (formerly Russian: Гельны, Polish: Giełny) is a village in Kėdainiai district municipality, in Kaunas County, in central Lithuania. According to the 2011 census, the village had a population of 47 people. It is located 3 kilometres (1.9 mi) from Vandžiogala, by the Mėkla river and its tributary the Klampis, next to the A8 highway, nearby the Labūnava Forest.

There is an agroservice, a wayside chapel (cultural heritage object), a cemetery and many wooden sculptures made by local wood carver.

== History ==
In the beginning of the 20th century, there was Gelnai village and zaścianek in Babtai volost.

== Demography ==
Historical population

| Year | Pop. | ±% p.a. |
|---|---|---|
| 1902 | 162 | — |
| 1923 | 267 | +2.41% |
| 1959 | 237 | −0.33% |
| 1970 | 177 | −2.62% |

| Year | Pop. | ±% p.a. |
|---|---|---|
| 1979 | 147 | −2.04% |
| 1989 | 94 | −4.37% |
| 2001 | 77 | −1.65% |
| 2011 | 47 | −4.82% |

Source: 1902, 1923, 1959 & 1970, 1979, 1989, 2001, 2011

== Notable people ==
- Bronius Vyšniauskas (1923–2015), Lithuanian sculptor.

== Images ==
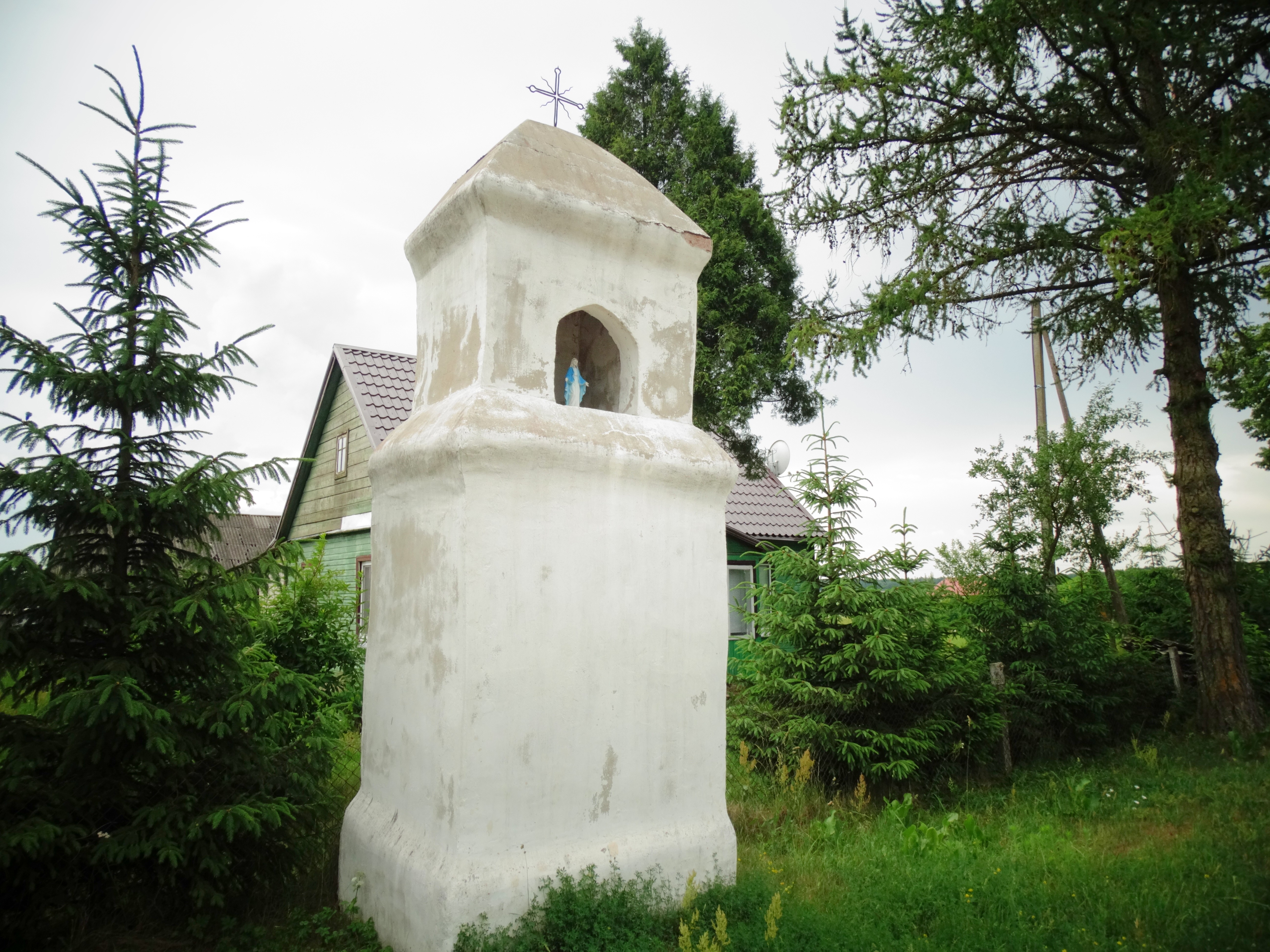
Gelnai chapel

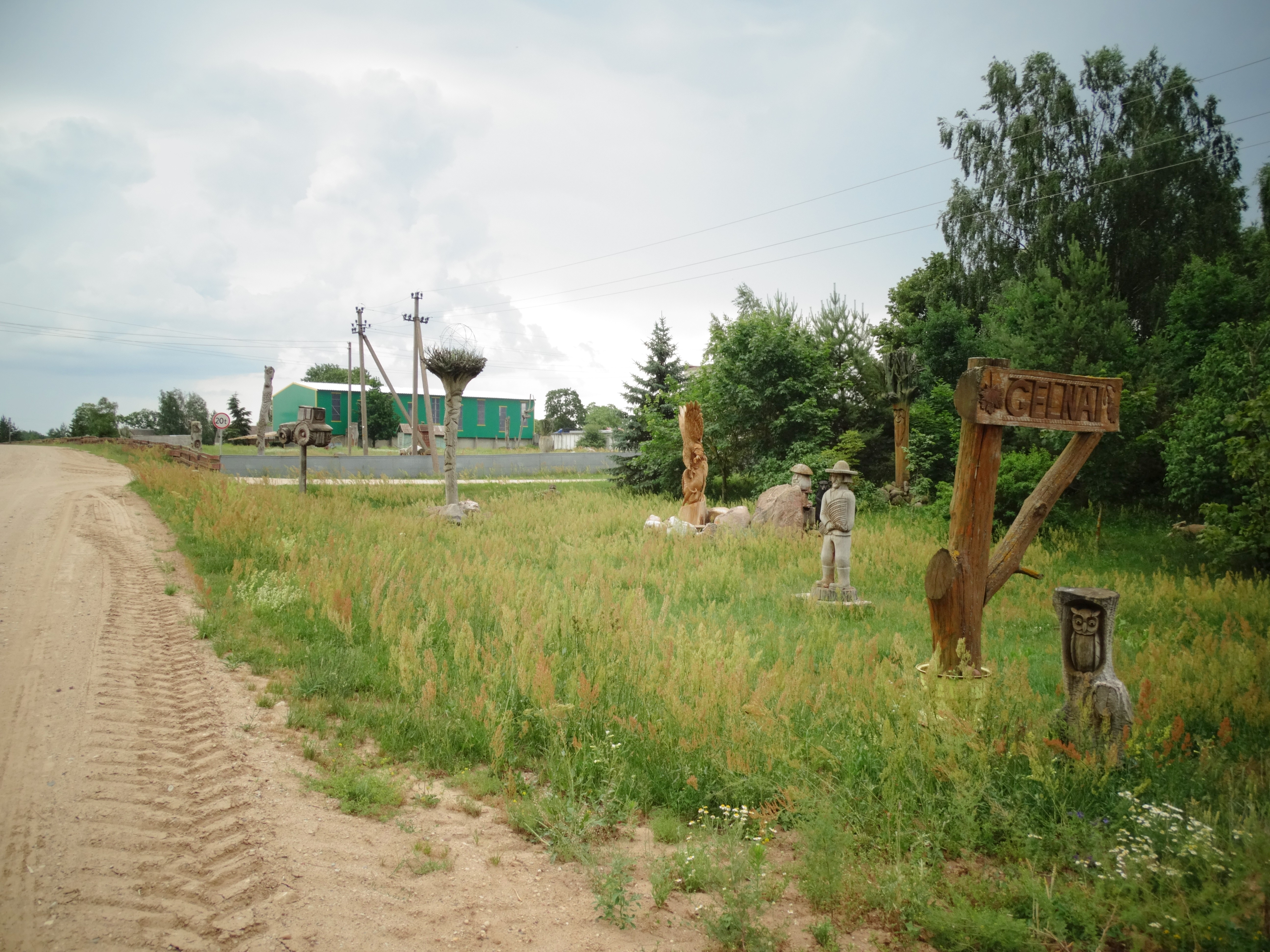
Wooden sculptures

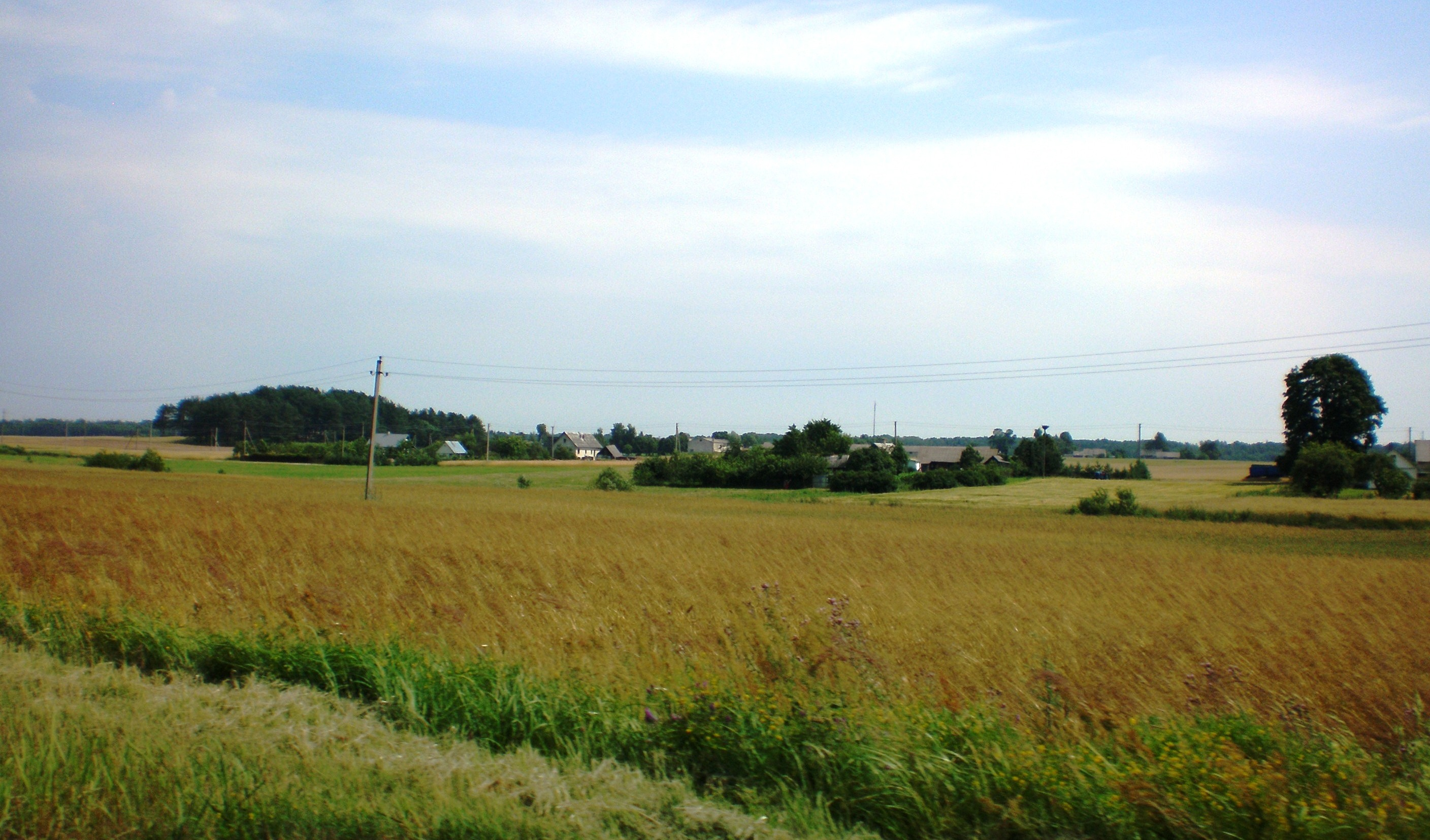
Gelnai from A8 road

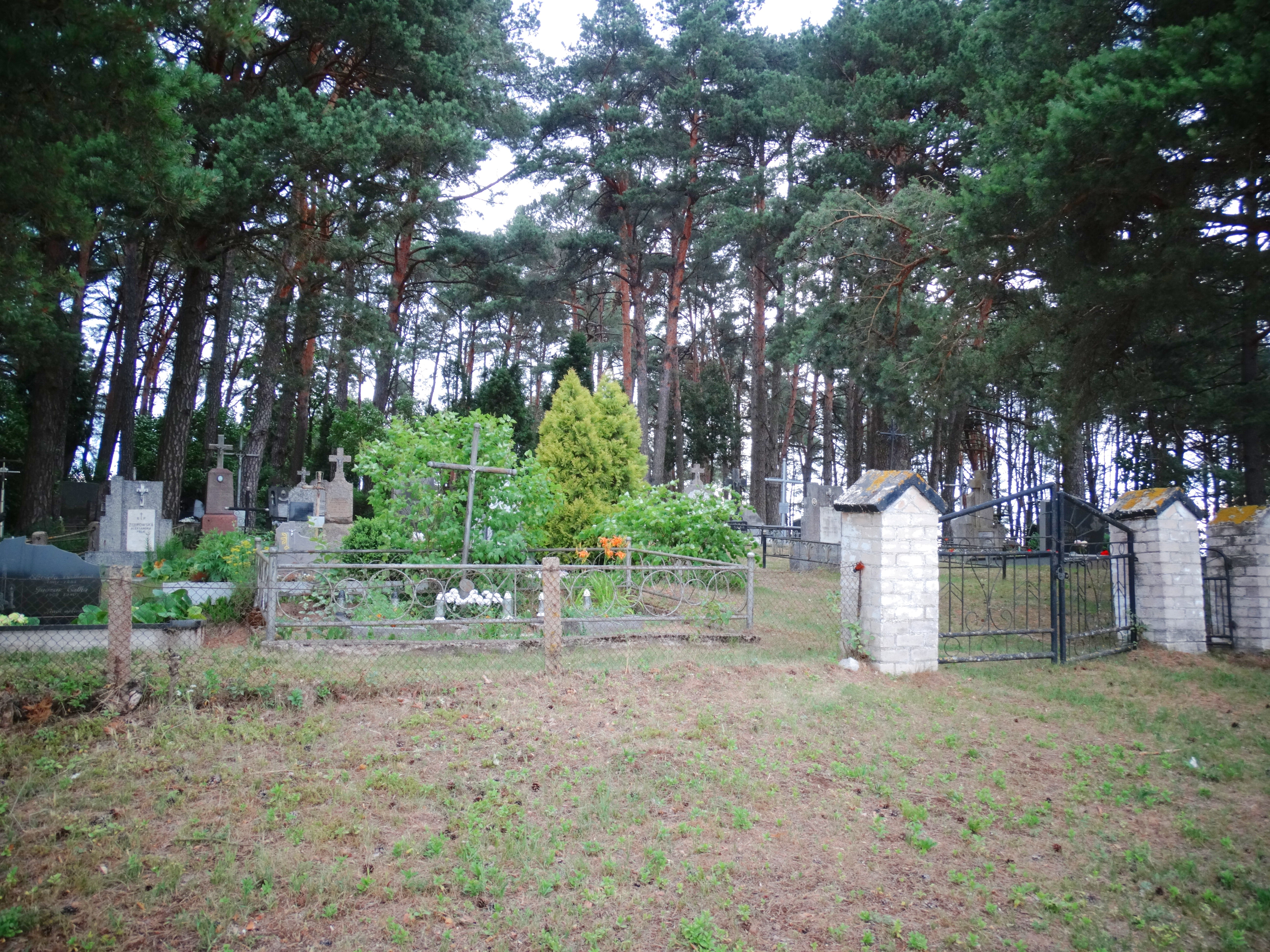
Cemetery
