= Barawlyany, Minsk district =

Village in Minsk Region, Belarus

Barawlyany Бараўляны (Belarusian) Боровляны (Russian)
- Village
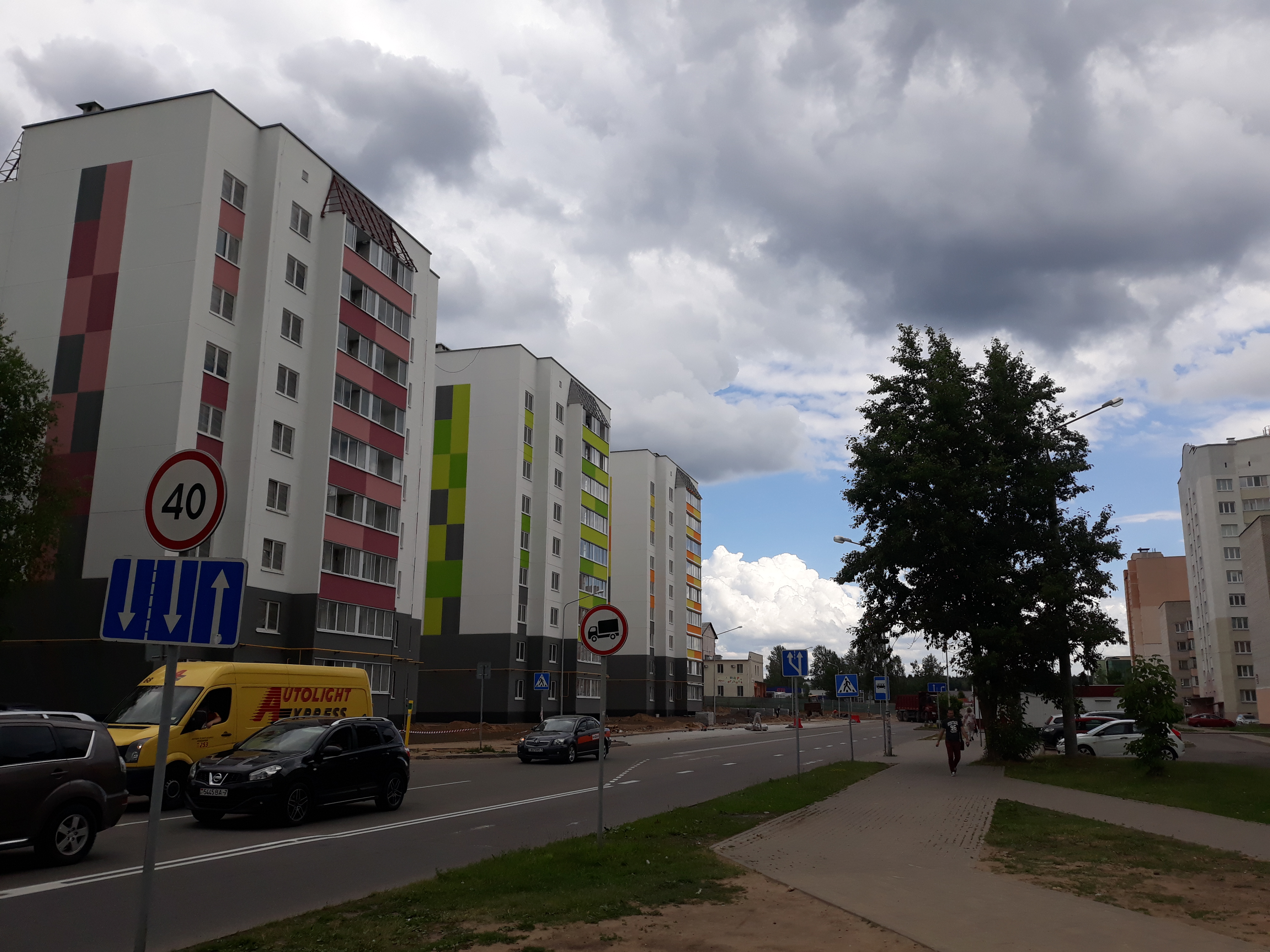

- Location within Belarus
- Coordinates: 53°59′53″N 27°40′04″E
- Country: Belarus
- Region: Minsk Region
- District: Minsk District

Population (2010)
  - Total: 8,219
- Time zone: UTC+3 (MSK)

Barawlyany (Belarusian: Бараўляны, romanized: Baraŭliany; Russian: Боровляны, romanized: Borovlyany) is a village in Minsk district, Minsk region, Belarus. It is administratively part of Barawlyany rural council (selsoviet). It is located about six kilometres (3.7 mi) from the Minsk Ring Road, north of the capital Minsk. In 2010, it had a population of 8,219.

== History ==
In 2021, Belarusian president Alexander Lukashenko suggested to merge Barawlyany with adjacent settlements: Lyasny agrotown, Vopytny settlement and Lyeskawka village, into a city with a population of about 70,000, but soon the idea was abandoned.
