= 1999 Belarus census =

The 1999 Belarusian census was the first census in Belarus after it became an independent state after the dissolution of the Soviet Union. Previous census data in the territory of Belarus may be found in Soviet censuses and the Russian Empire census.

== See also ==
- 2009 Belarusian census
