= 2009 Belarus census =

The 2009 Belarusian census was the second census in Belarus after it became an independent state after the dissolution of the Soviet Union. The census was carried out during October 14–24, 2009. The initial results are to be announced by February 1, 2010. Full processing of census data is expected to take about two years.

97% of residents of the country took part in the census.

In 2008, it was announced that the United Nations Commission on Population and Development approved a grant of $800 million to Belarus for this purpose.

== Maps ==
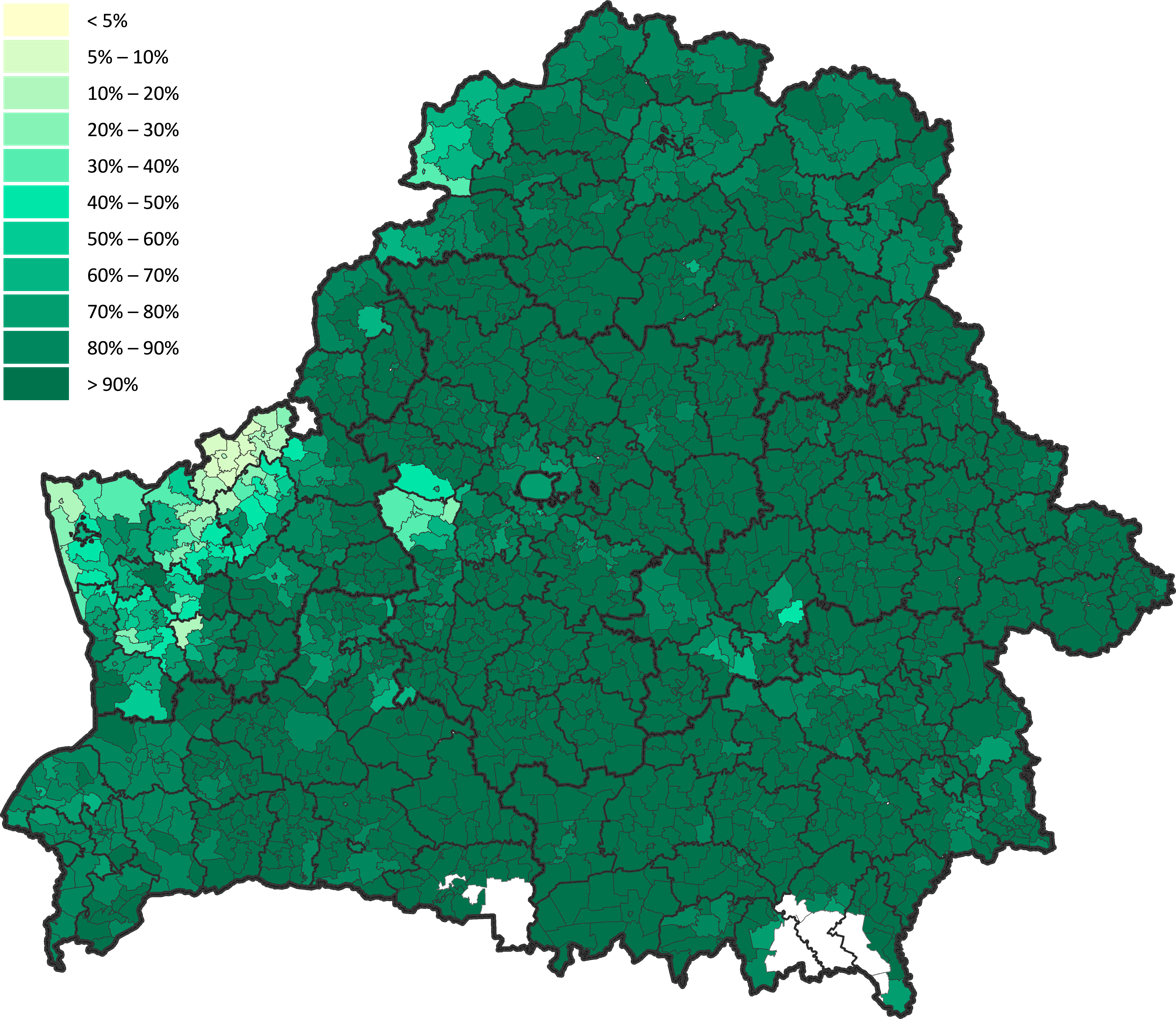
Distribution of Belarusians by 3rd level administrative units

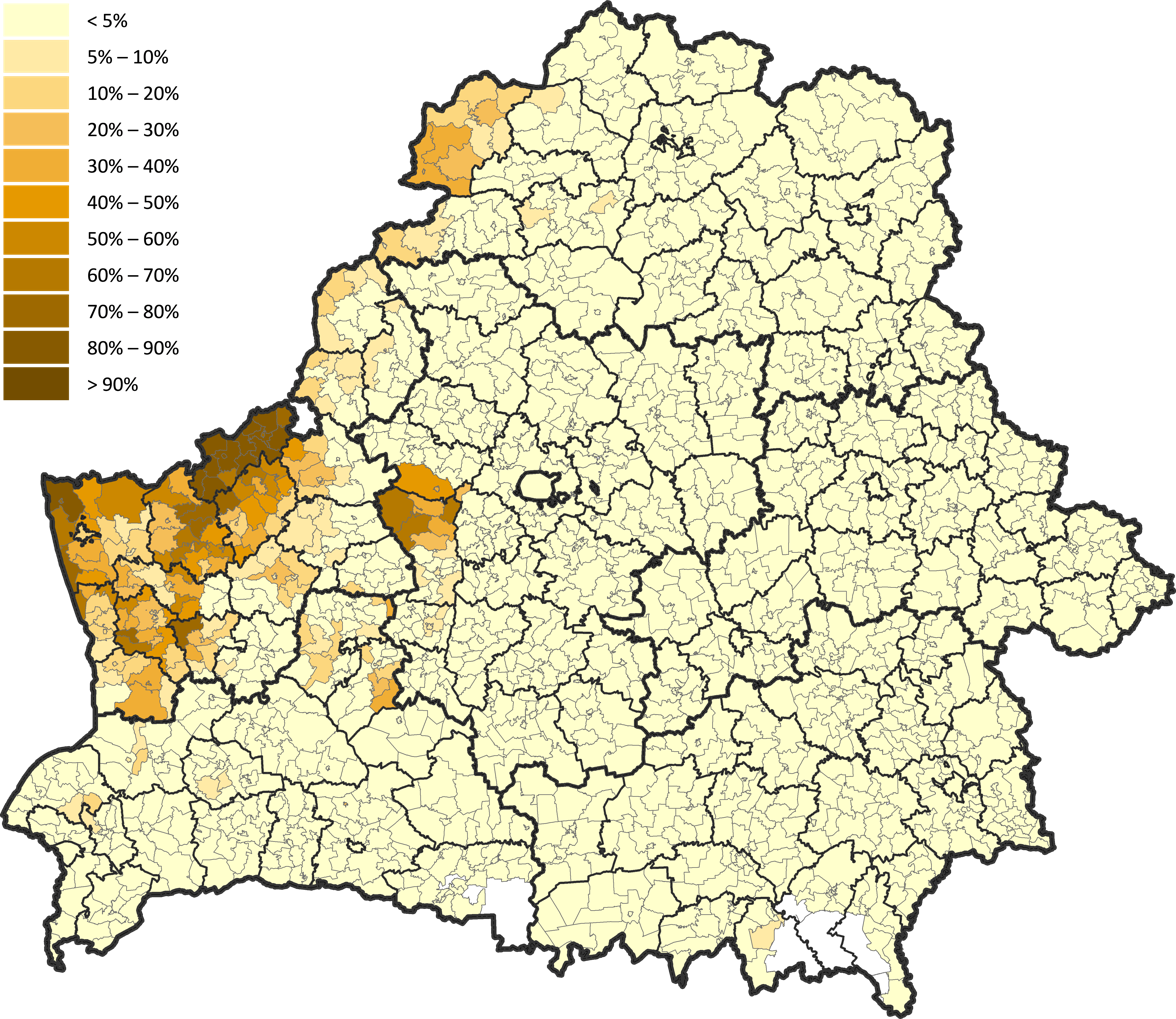
Distribution of Poles by 3rd level administrative units

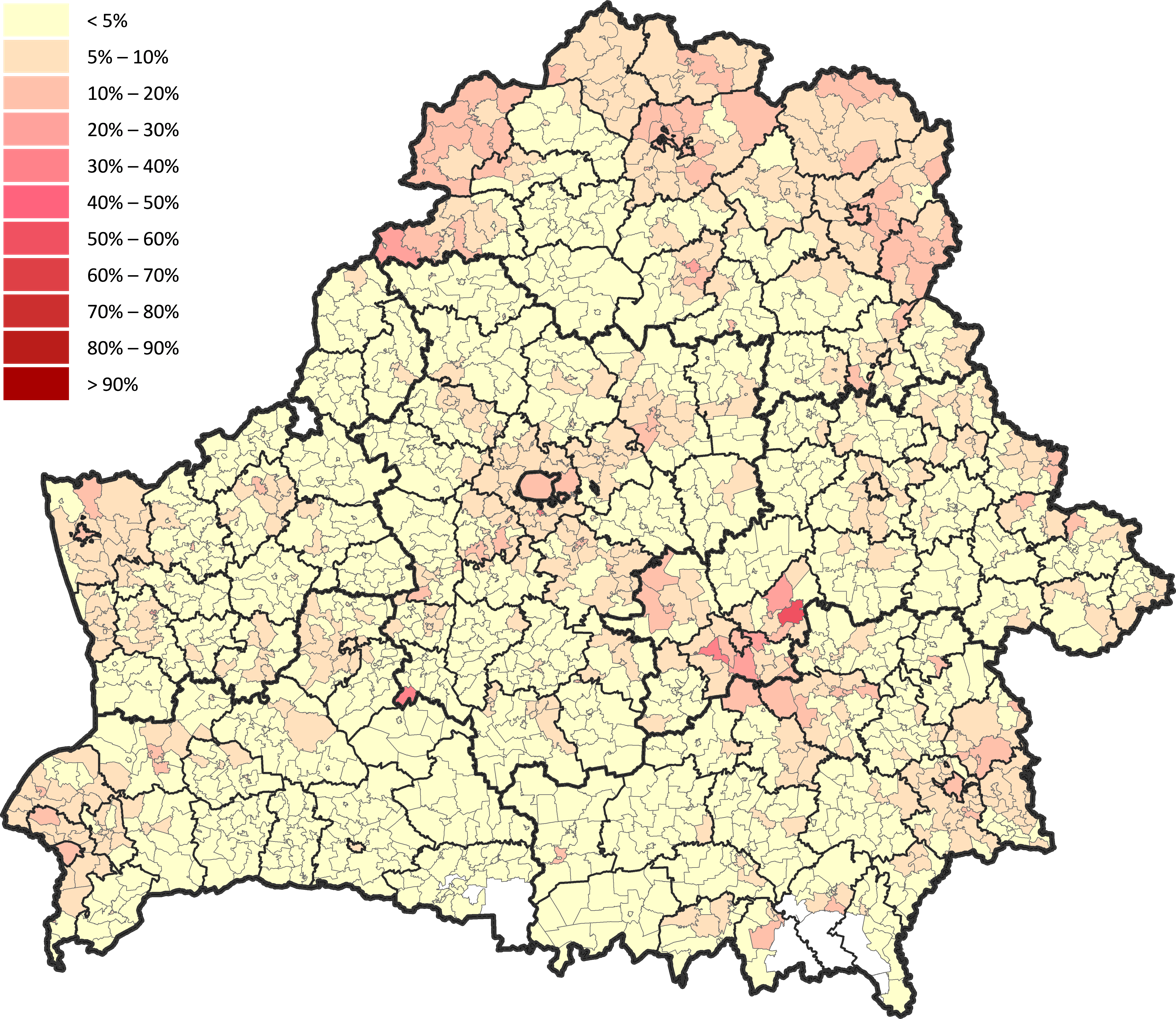
Distribution of Russians by 3rd level administrative units

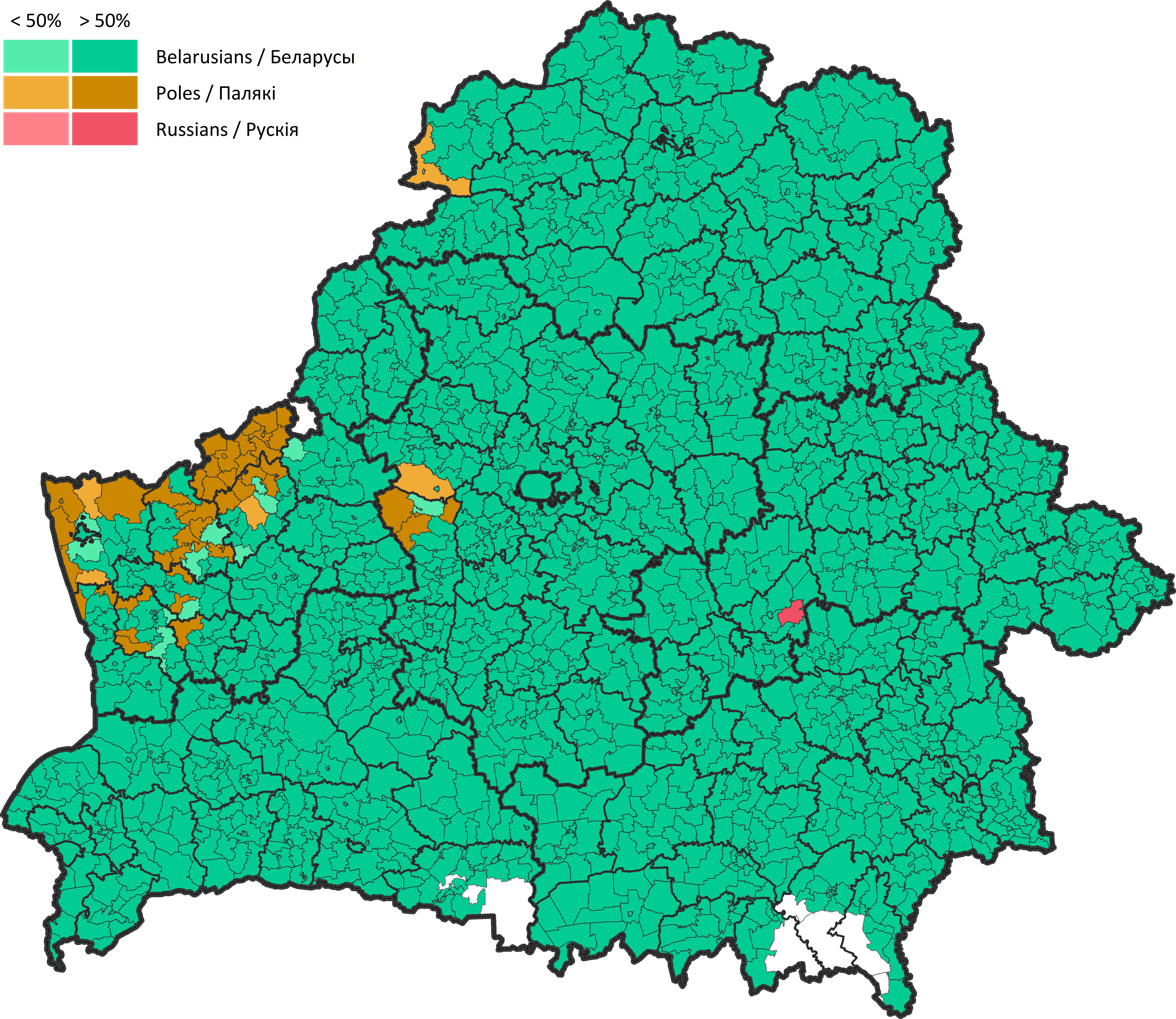
3rd level administrative units by ethnic majority

== See also ==
- 1999 Belarusian census
- 2019 Belarus census
- Soviet census
- Russian Empire census
