= Brahin district =

District of Gomel region, Belarus

Brahin district Брагінскі раён (Belarusian) Брагинский район (Russian)
- District
- Flag Coat of arms

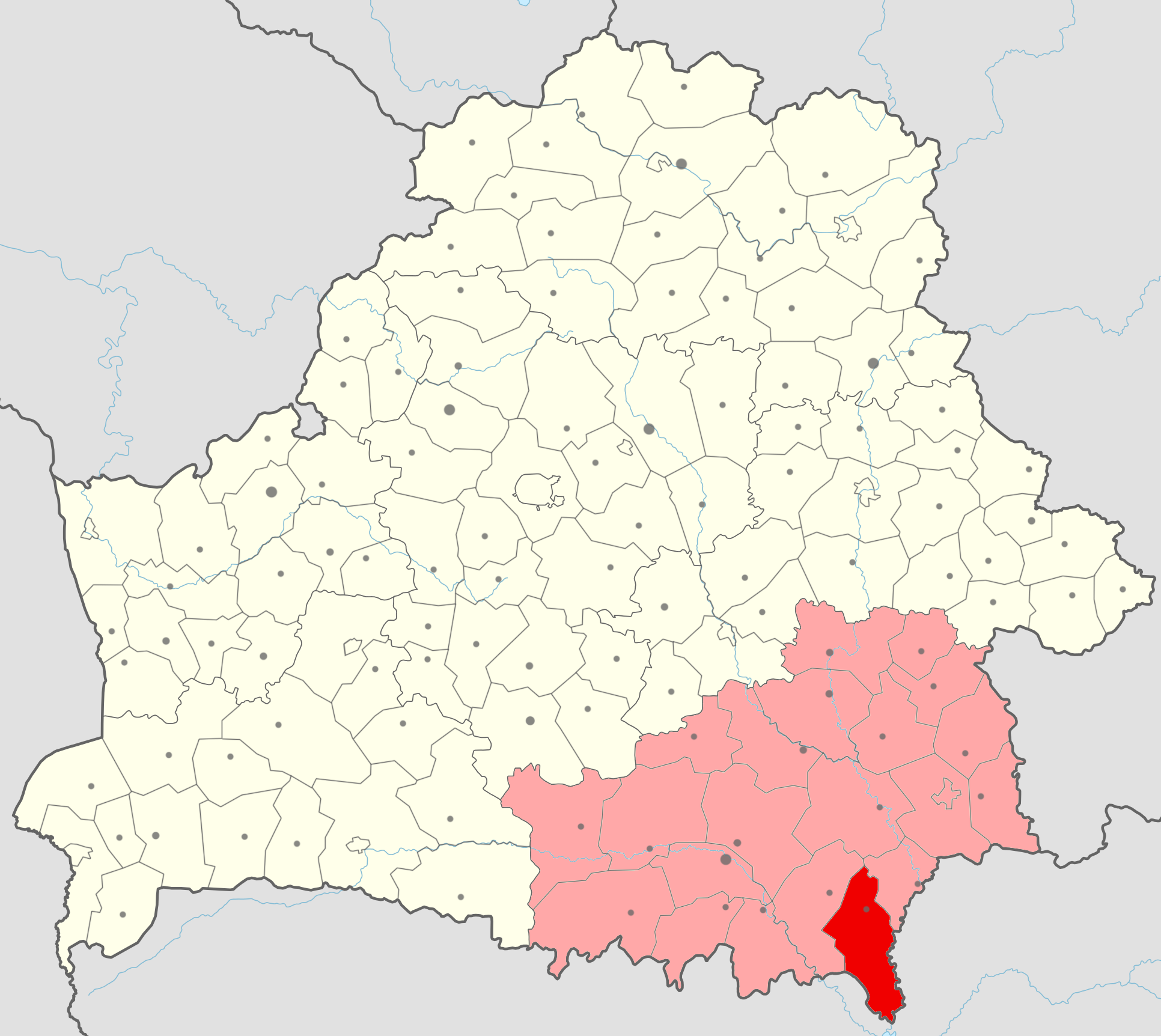
- Location of Brahin district within Gomel region
- Coordinates: 51°47′N 30°16′E
- Country: Belarus
- region: Gomel Region
- Administrative center: Brahin

Area
  - Total: 1,960.46 km^{2} (756.94 sq mi)

Population (2024)
  - Total: 11,726
- Time zone: UTC+3 (MSK)
- Website: Official website

Brahin district or Bragin district (Belarusian: Брагінскі раён, romanized: Brahinski rajon; Russian: Брагинский район) is a district (raion) of Gomel region in Belarus. Its administrative seat is the town of Brahin. As of 2024, it has a population of 11,726.

== Geography ==
The district includes the towns of Brahin and Kamaryn, and 14 rural councils (selsoviets). Following the 1986 Chernobyl disaster, it is partially included in the Polesie State Radioecological Reserve. To the south of Kamaryn is situated the southernmost point of Belarus.

== Notable residents ==
- Julija Cimafiejeva (b. 1982, Śpiaryžža village), Belarusian poet and translator

== See also ==
- Brahin (meteorite)
- Chernihiv–Ovruch railway
- Chernobyl Nuclear Power Plant
- Patskau, a former settlement in Brahin
