= 2019 Belarus census =

Census of Belarus

The Belarus Census of 2019 is the third census in Belarus after it became an independent state after the dissolution of the Soviet Union. The census was carried out during October 4–30, 2019. It is the first census in the country that incorporated a website where residents could fill out an online form to participate.

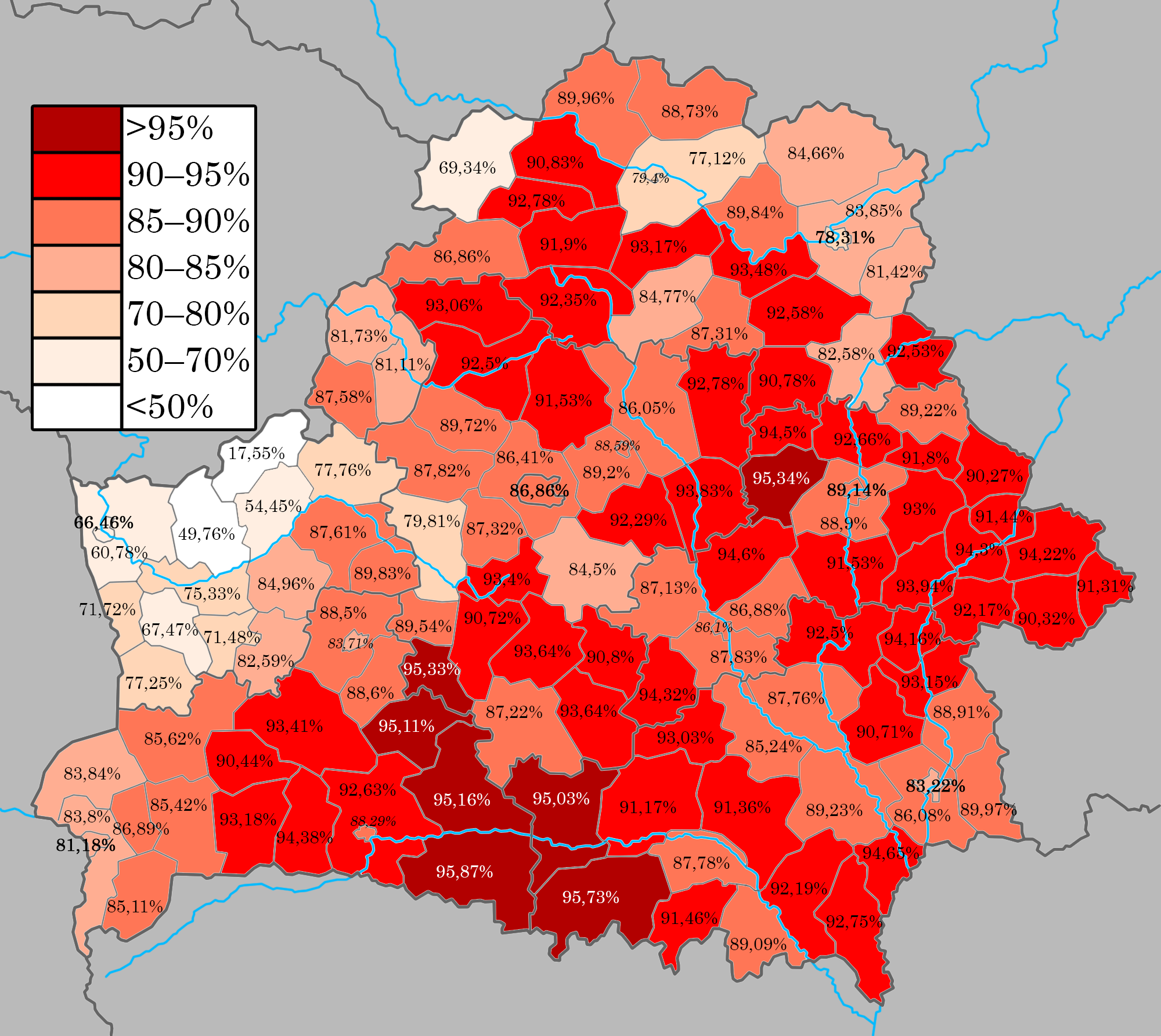
Belarusians

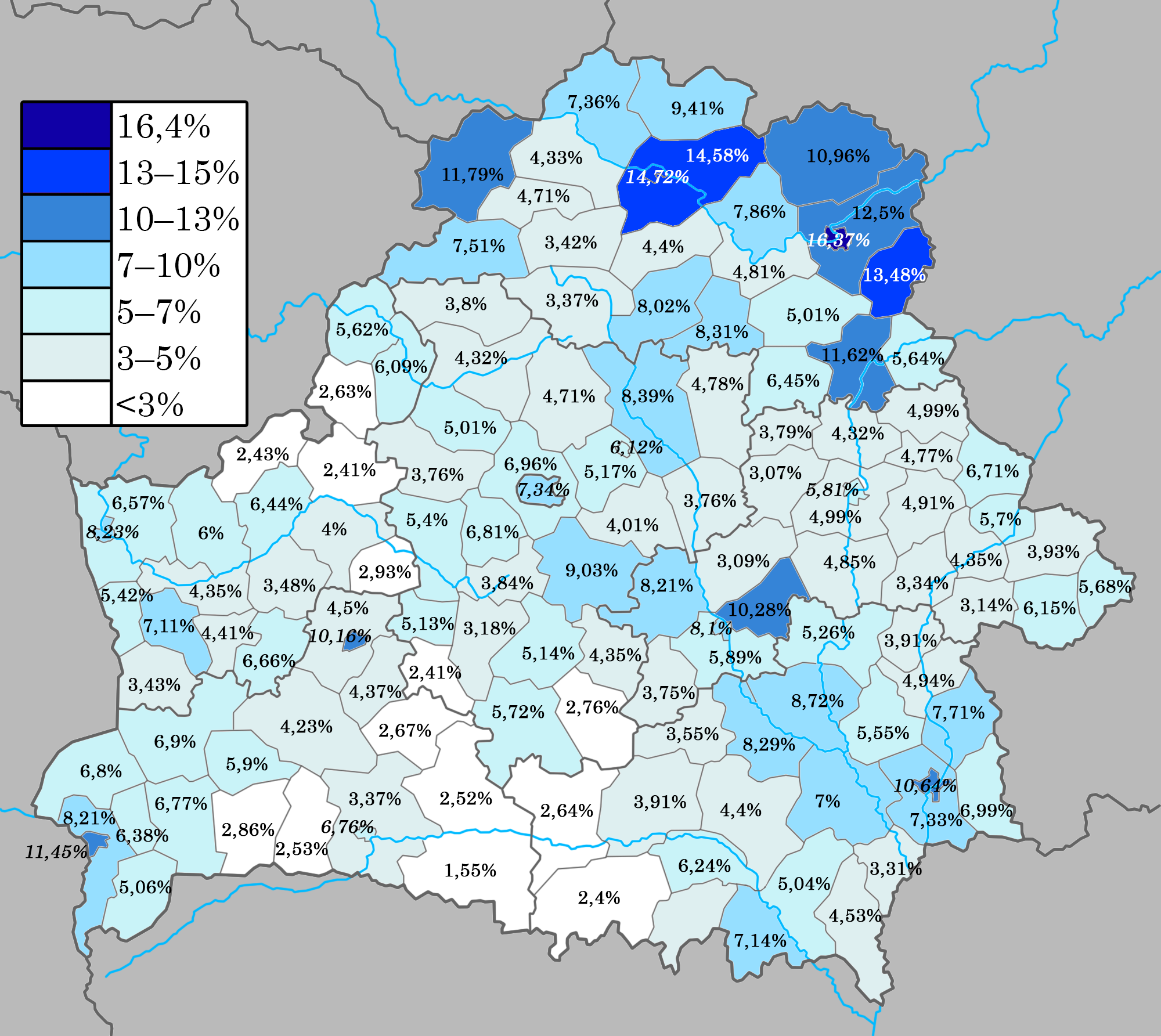
Russians

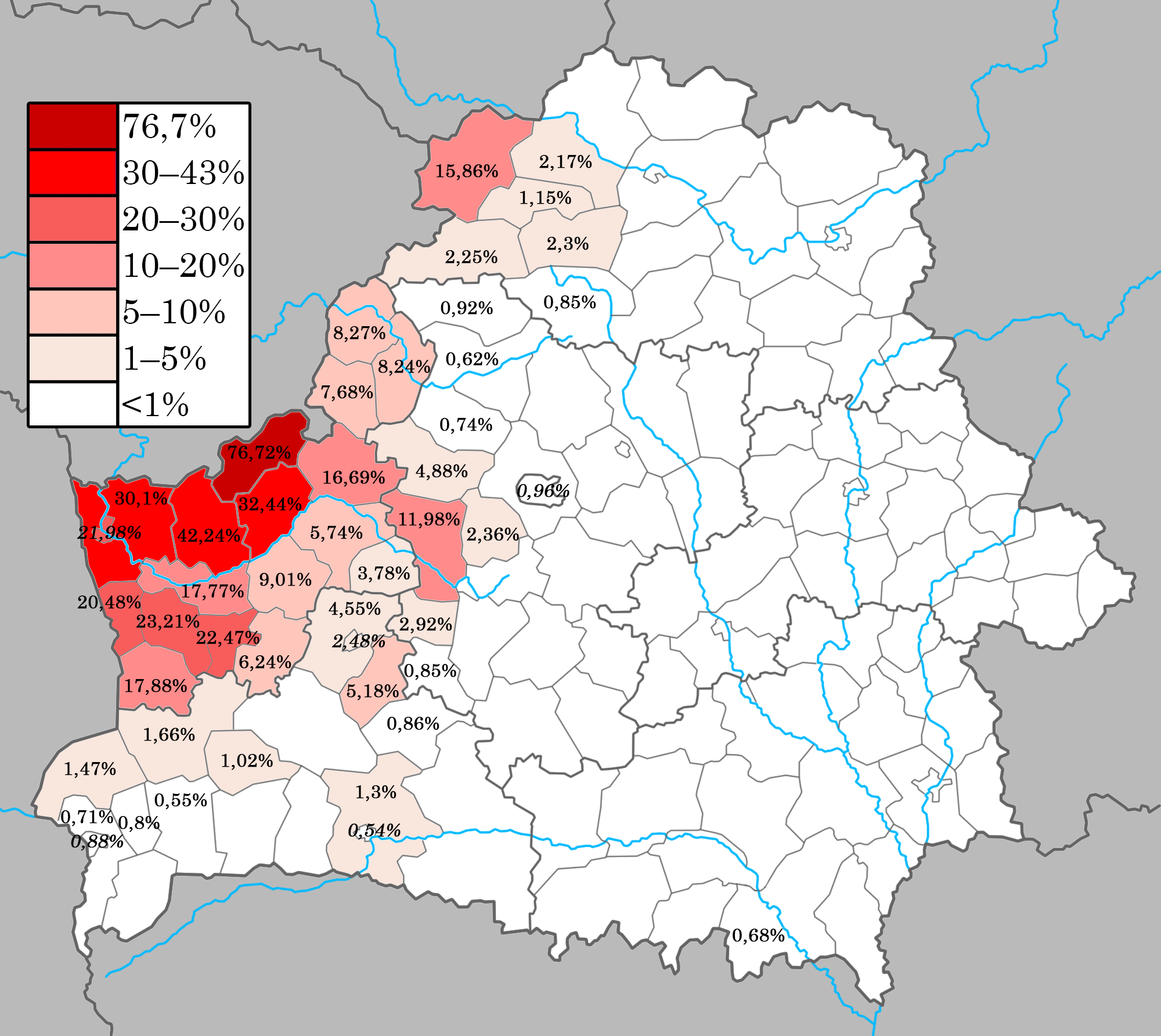
Poles

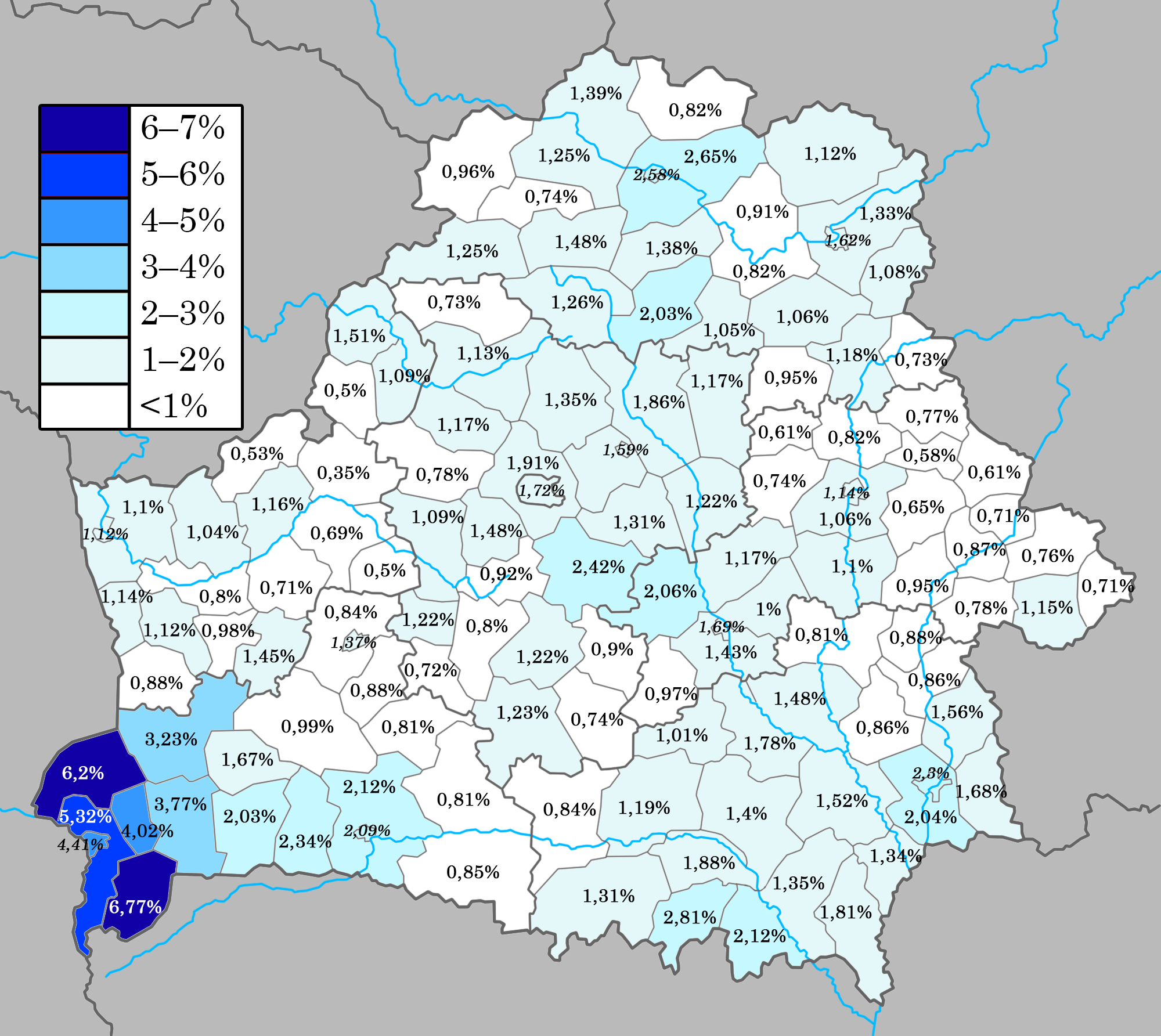
Ukrainians

== See also ==
- 1999 Belarusian census
- 2009 Belarusian census
