= Medekšiai =

- Village
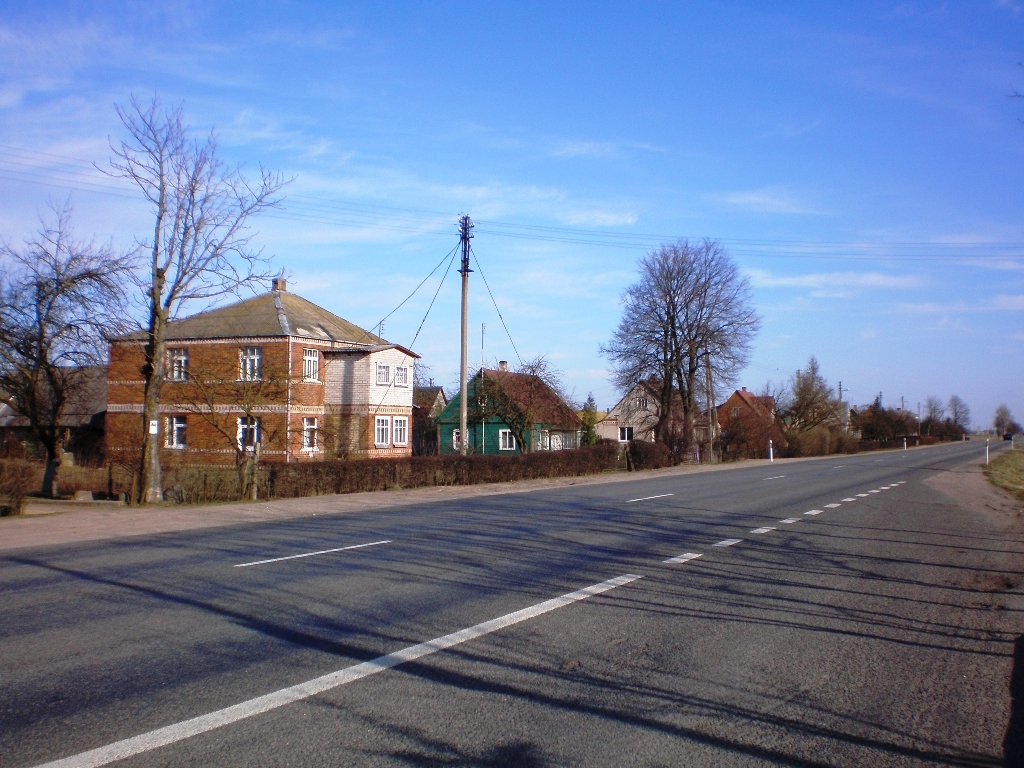

- Location in Lithuania Medekšiai (Lithuania)
- Coordinates: 55°14′10″N 23°59′49″E
- Country: Lithuania
- County: Kaunas County
- Municipality: Kėdainiai district municipality
- Eldership: Pelėdnagiai Eldership

Population (2011)
  - Total: 184
- Time zone: UTC+2 (EET)
  - Summer (DST): UTC+3 (EEST)

Medekšiai (formerly Russian: Медекши, Polish: Medeksze) is a village in Kėdainiai district municipality, in Kaunas County, in central Lithuania. According to the 2011 census, the village had a population of 184 people. It is located 5 kilometres (3.1 mi) from Kėdainiai, by the Šerkšnys river, alongside the Jonava-Šeduva (KK144) road. A phosphogypsum waste dump of "Lifosa" fertilizer factory is located next to Medekšiai.

== History ==
Medekšiai has been known since the 15th century. King Jogaila presented the village to a certain Proszczy whose nickname was Medekša. Pranciškus Medekša, a judge of Kovensky Uyezd, was a member of this family. At the end of the 19th century, Medekšiai was a property of the Geištarai. Činkiai village and Slabadėlė folwark belonged to the Medekšiai Manor.

During the Soviet era, Medekšiai was a subsidiary settlement of the "Spike" kolkhoz.

== Demography ==
Historical population

Year	Pop.	±% p.a.
1902	99	—
1923	111	+0.55%
1959	277	+2.57%
1970	313	+1.12%
1979	295	−0.66%

Year	Pop.	±% p.a.
1986	245	−2.62%
1989	225	−2.80%
2001	202	−0.89%
2011	184	−0.93%

Source: 1902, 1923, 1959 & 1970, 1979, 1989, 2001, 2011

== Images ==
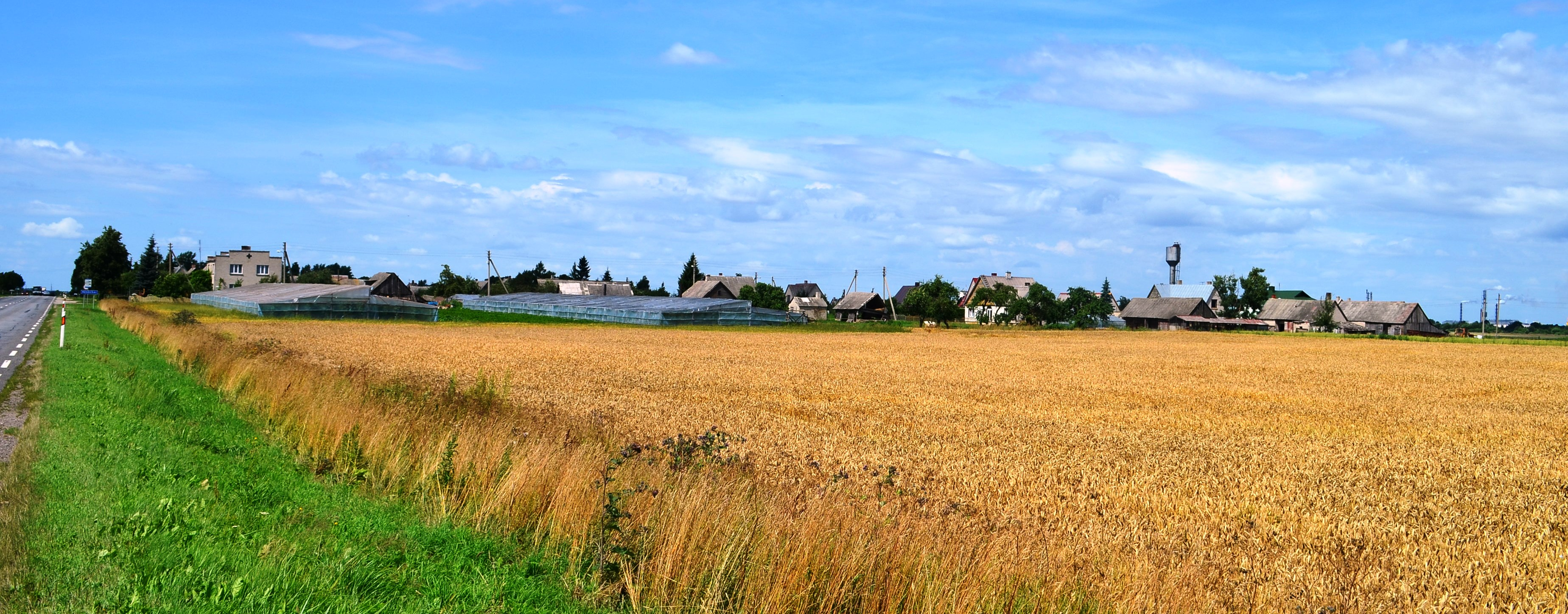
Medekšiai from Nociūnai side

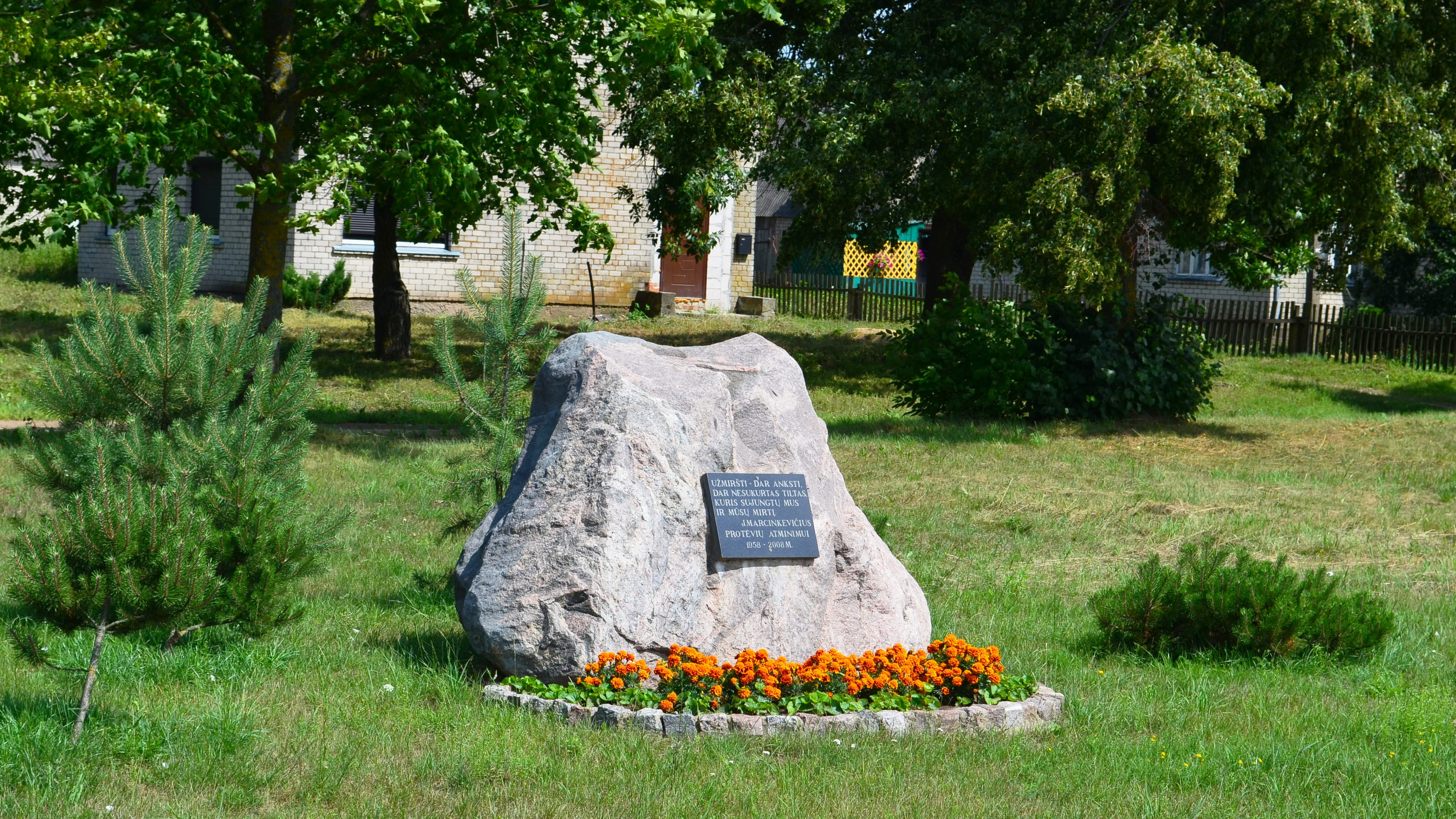
A monument to the forefathers of poet Justinas Marcinkevičius

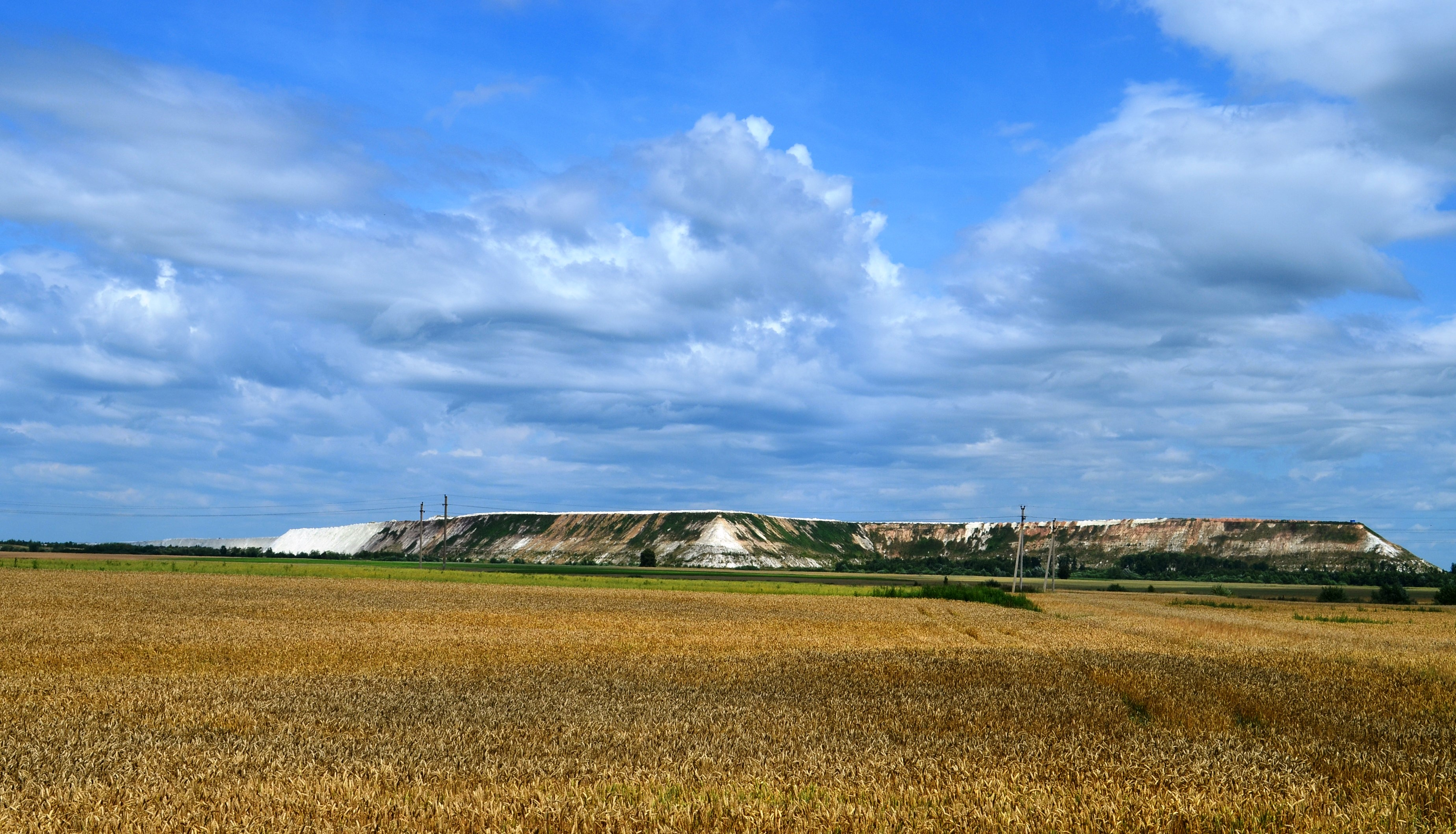
"Lifosa" phosphogypsum "mountains"
