= Ašarėna =

River in Lithuania

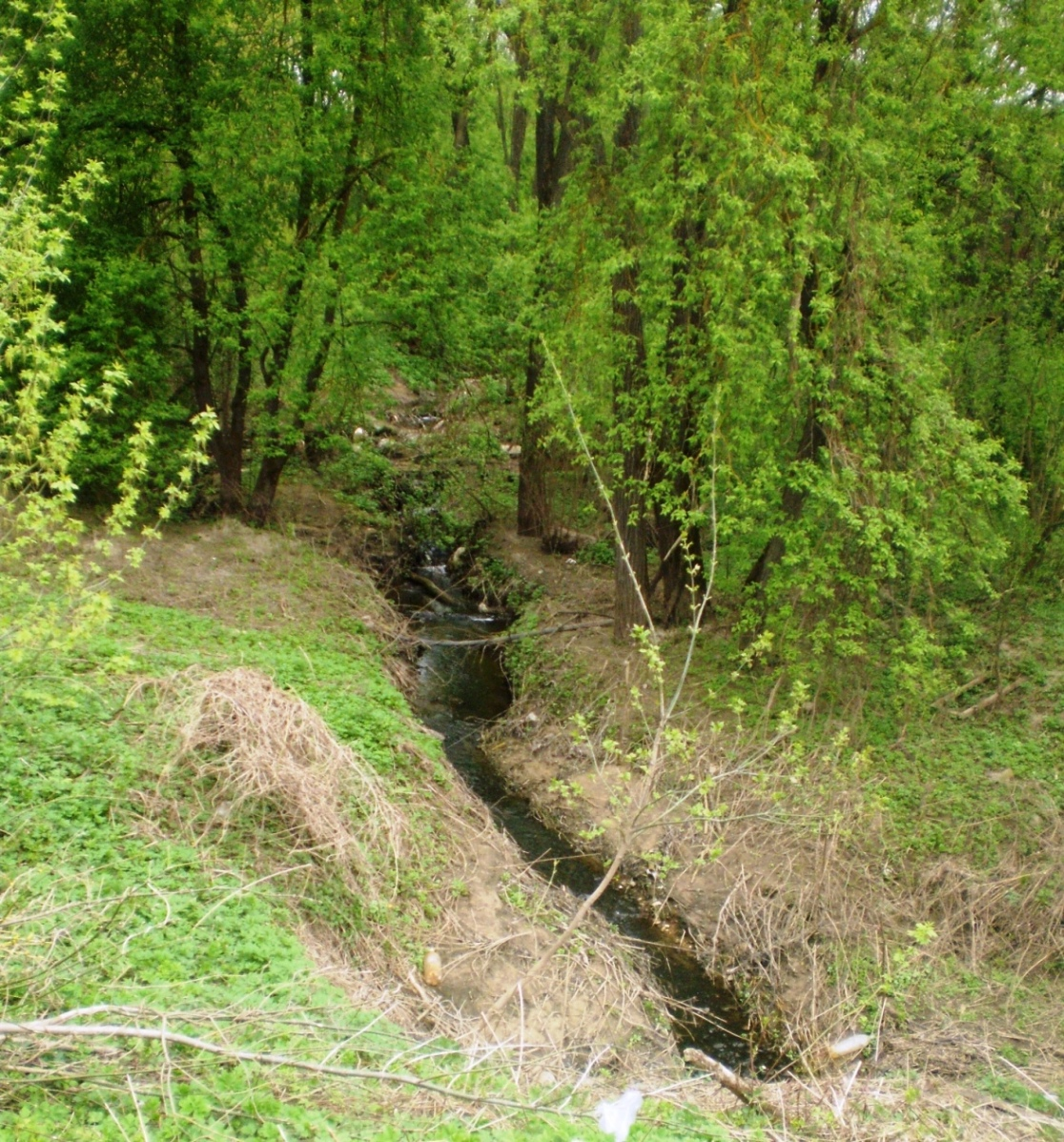
- The lower course of Ašarėna downstream Pelėdnagiai

Location
- Country: Lithuania
- Location: Kėdainiai district municipality, Kaunas County

Physical characteristics
- Source
  - location: Pašiliai Forest
- Mouth: Nevėžis, nearby Pelėdnagiai
  - coordinates: 55.2464°N 23.9494°E
- Length: 6.4 km (4.0 mi)
- Basin size: 8.8 km^{2} (3.4 sq mi)
- Discharge
  - average: 0.053 m^{3}/s

Basin features
- Progression: Nevėžis→ Neman→ Baltic Sea

The Ašarėna is a river in Kėdainiai district municipality, Kaunas County, in central Lithuania. It flows for 6.4 kilometres and has a basin area of 8.8 km^{2}.

A left-bank tributary of the Nevėžis, the Ašarėna starts in the Pašiliai Forest, 1 kilometre (0.62 mi) from Medekšiai. It meets the Nevėžis next to Pelėdnagiai. There are two ponds on the Ašarėna in Pelėdnagiai.

The hydronym possibly derives from Lithuanian word ešerys (or ašarys in local dialect, 'perch'). Its original form could have been *Ešerinė.
