= Paobelys =

- Village
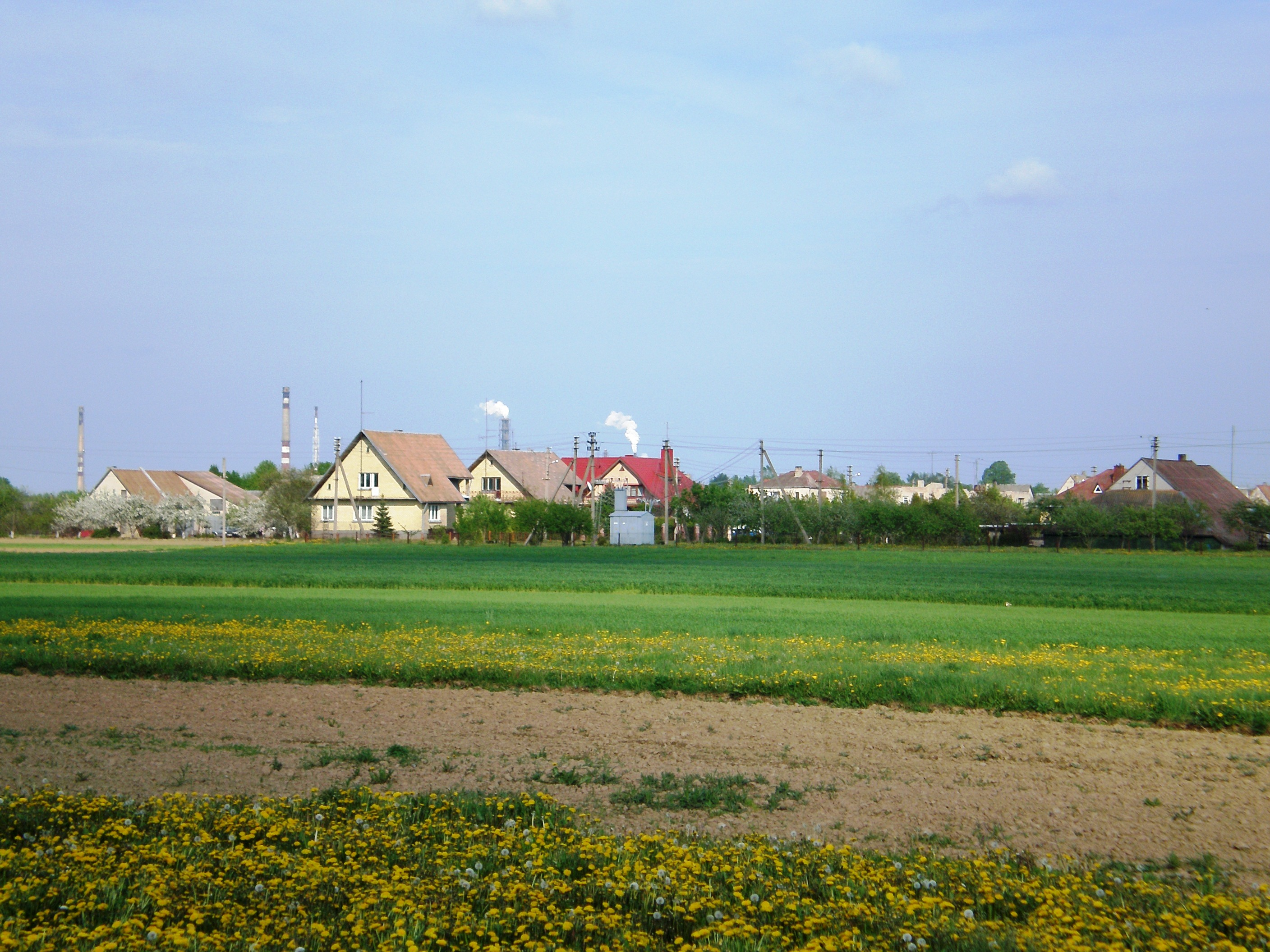

- Location in Lithuania Paobelys (Lithuania)
- Coordinates: 55°15′50″N 23°58′01″E
- Country: Lithuania
- County: Kaunas County
- Municipality: Kėdainiai district municipality
- Eldership: Pelėdnagiai Eldership

Population (2011)
  - Total: 293
- Time zone: UTC+2 (EET)
  - Summer (DST): UTC+3 (EEST)

Paobelys (Paobelė, formerly Russian: Поабель, Polish: Poabele) is a village in Kėdainiai district municipality of Kaunas County, in central Lithuania. According to the 2011 census, the village residents numbered 293. It is located by the southeastern edge of Kėdainiai city, by the confluence of the Obelis and Nevėžis rivers, next to the intersection of the Jonava-Šeduva (KK144) and Kėdainiai-Babtai roads. The Šerkšnys river passes through the village.

== History ==
In the beginning of the 20th century, Paobelys was a small falwark.

During the Soviet era, Paobelys was a subsidiary settlement of the "Spike" kolkhoz.

== Demography ==
Historical population

Year	Pop.	±% p.a.
1902	9	—
1923	21	+4.12%
1959	61	+3.01%
1970	247	+13.56%
1979	347	+3.85%

Year	Pop.	±% p.a.
1986	332	−0.63%
1989	307	−2.58%
2001	292	−0.42%
2011	293	+0.03%

Source: 1902, 1923, 1959 & 1970, 1979, 1989, 2001, 2011
