= Lost Shtetl Museum =

Jewish history museum

Coordinates: 55.7472°N 23.7720°E

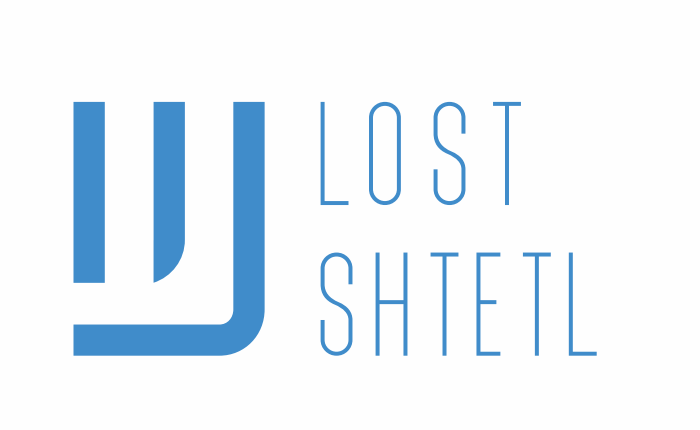
Logo of the Lost Shtetl Museum

The Lost Shtetl Museum, also known as Šeduva Jewish Museum "The Lost Shtetl" is a privately owned NGO museum of Jewish history. The museum tells about the Jewish community that lived in Šeduva, Lithuania, through the stories of their daily life, social and religious practices, commercial and cultural ties, as well as the destruction of this and other Jewish communities during The Holocaust.

== Museum mission ==
"Shtetl" is a Yiddish word meaning a "town" with a large Jewish community. There were several thousand shtetls in the territory of the Grand Duchy of Lithuania—where Jewish communities lived alongside neighbours such as Lithuanians, Latvians, Poles, Belarusians, and Ukrainians for centuries. In independent Lithuania during the interwar period (1918–1940), about 200 small towns could be referred to as shtetls: Jonava, Radviliškis, Švenčionys, Eržvilkas, Rozalimas, Žasliai, Žiežmariai, Šeduva, Telšiai and dozens of others, where Jews made up 20-70% of the population. During the Holocaust in Lithuania the majority of the Jewish population in Lithuania perished. Their unique way of life in shtetls was also lost.

The building of "The Lost Shtetl" museum is like a small shtetl, consisting of separate houses with architectural forms characteristic of Jewish architecture, with a building that resembles a synagogue architecture dominating the space (architect Rainer Mahlamäki and Lahdelma & Mahlamäki Architects). The museum area includes the museum building (exhibition and visitor center), as well as a park established next to the museum and the nearby old Šeduva Jewish cemetery.

=== Collection ===
The museum's collection consists of historical material gathered from archives, libraries, and museums in Lithuania and abroad. A significant portion of the museum's collections includes historical photographs received from the descendants of the Šeduva Jewish community living in Lithuania and abroad, along with other items they have donated and stories they have told. The museum's archives also store filmed interview material from the museum curators' expeditions to Israel and South Africa – countries where part of the Šeduva Jewish community emigrated to after surviving the Holocaust. "The Lost Shtetl" collects exhibits not only from Šeduva but also from other Lithuanian shtetls – the museum displays artifacts from the Ashmena, Seda, and Valkininkai synagogues.

=== Design and architecture ===
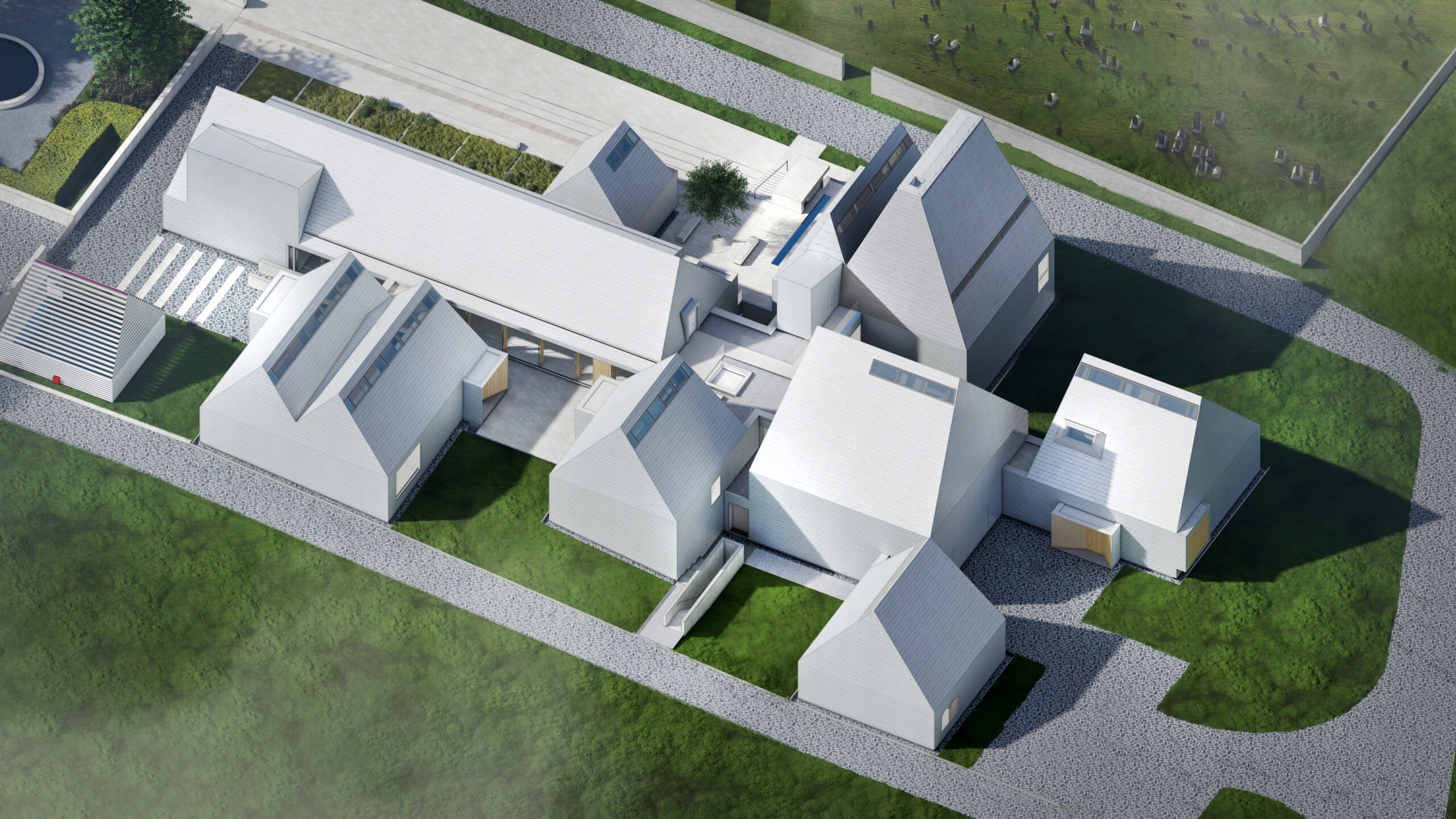
The Lost Shtetl museum from above in Šeduva, Lithuania

The building of "The Lost Shtetl" museum covers an area of more than 3,400 square meters. The exhibition interior is being designed by the U.S. design firm "Ralph Appelbaum Associates", and the building was designed by the Finnish company "Lahdelma & Mahlamäki Architects". The project is led by architect Rainer Mahlamäki, who previously designed the POLIN Museum of the History of Polish Jews. The architectural partner in Lithuania is "Studija 2A".

=== Memorial complex ===
The museum buildings form part of an overall memorial complex, which includes the restored old Jewish cemetery in Šeduva, three memorial monuments near the sites of Jewish executions (Šeduva Jewish Holocaust I site, Šeduva Jewish Holocaust II site, Pakutėnai forest), and a sculpture "The Girl" erected in the centre of Šeduva to commemorate the Jewish community. All of these monuments were designed by Lithuanian sculptor Romualdas Kvintas. A monument has also been erected in the current town square to honour the synagogues that once stood there, created by sculptor Marijonas Šlektavičius.

The three memorial monuments mark the sites in the Pakutėnai and Liaudiškės forests, where Šeduva Jews were killed on August 25–26, 1941. In the Liaudiškės forest, 664 Šeduva residents were murdered—230 men, 275 women, and 159 children—their remains rest in two graves. Near the village of Pakutėnai, slightly earlier than in Liaudiškės, about 20 Jews were killed, including the last rabbi of Šeduva, Mordechai Henkin. The area around these mass execution sites has been organized, with road signs installed, so it is not difficult to locate and approach these sites at any time of year.

== Museum history ==
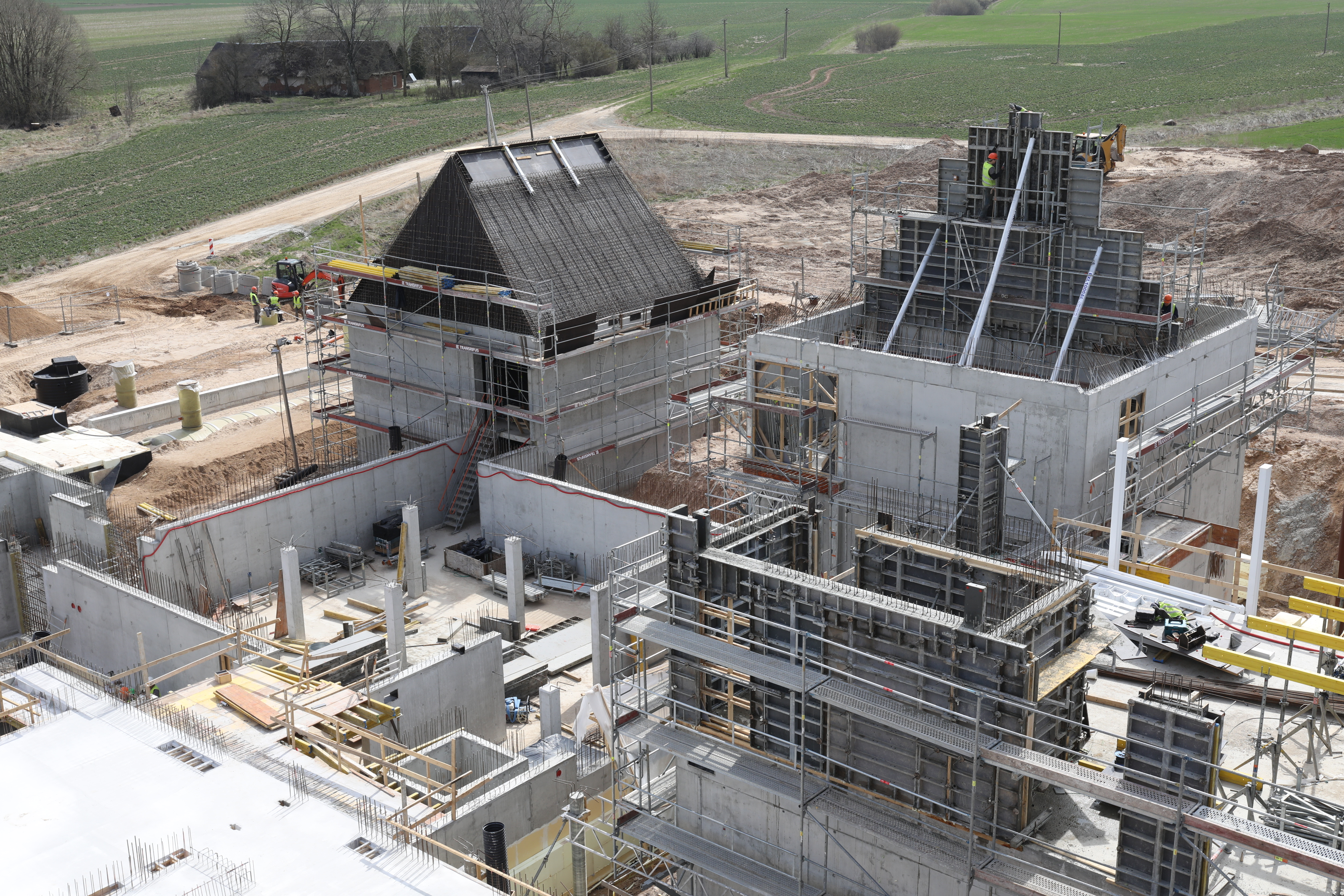
Construction of the museum, circa 2022

The Šeduva Jewish Museum "The Lost Shtetl", a public institution, has been carrying out the construction of a modern museum complex in Šeduva since 2015, coordinating the creation and installation of exhibitions, as well as scientific research. The cornerstone of the museum complex in Šeduva was laid in the spring of 2018, and the museum opening is planned for August 2025. The idea of the museum was initiated in 2014 by a founder and former CEO of "The Lost Shtetl" Sergey Kanovich (Sergejus Kanovičius). In 2017, the sponsor of organization purchased the shareholder rights from [Kanovičius, the founder of the non-profit "Šeduva Jewish Memorial Fund". In 2022, to better reflect the ongoing activities and the institution's mission, the organization's name was changed to "The Lost Shtetl Museum".

Since 2014, the museum (until 2022, the "Šeduva Jewish Memorial Fund") has been led by director Jonas Heraklis Dovydaitis. From 2012 to 2014, the "Šeduva Jewish Memorial Fund" was led by Juozas Bulota.

The Šeduva Jewish Museum "The Lost Shtetl" has assembled a team of curators and educators. The exhibition has been developed with consultations from Lithuanian and international experts. The exhibition concept was created and implemented by "The Lost Shtetl" team led by Sergejus Kanovičius and former chief curator of the exhibition Milda Jakulytė-Vasil, along with freelance consultants from the USA, Israel, Germany, Poland, and Lithuania.

The museum has been open since September 20, 2025.
