= Šerkšnys =

River in Lithuania

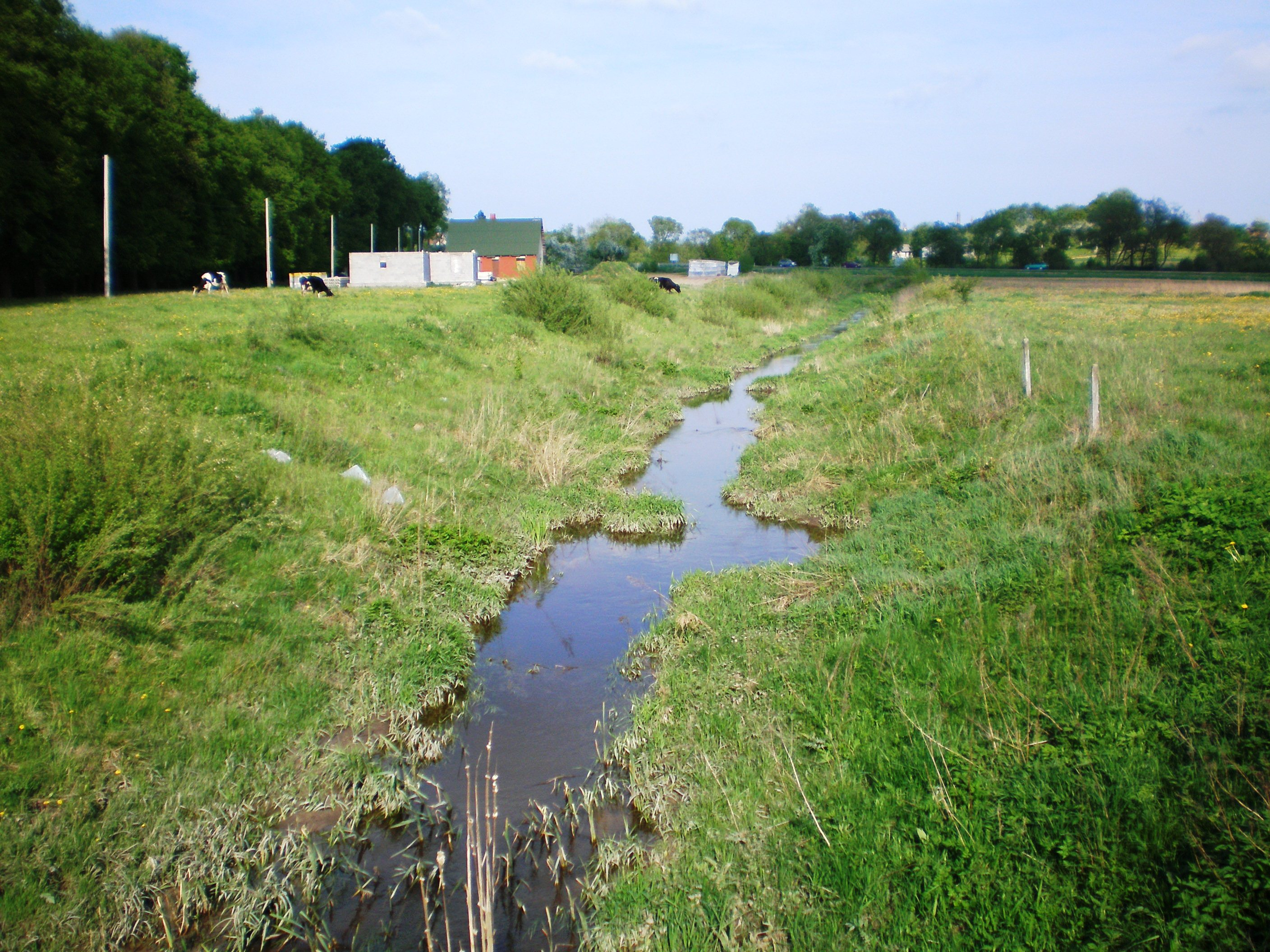
- Šerkšnys between Pelėdnagiai and Paobelys

Location
- Country: Lithuania
- Region: Kėdainiai district municipality, Kaunas County

Physical characteristics
- Source
  - location: Nearby Nociūnai
- Mouth: Nevėžis in Paobelys
  - coordinates: 55.2588°N 23.9546°E
- Length: 13.7 km (8.5 mi)
- Basin size: 34.6 km^{2} (13.4 sq mi)

Basin features
- Progression: Nevėžis→ Neman→ Baltic Sea
- Tributaries
  - right: Gentrinė

The Šerkšnys, or Šerkšnė, is a river of Kėdainiai district municipality, Kaunas County, in central Lithuania. The 14 kilometres (8.7 mi) long river has a basin area of 35 km^{2} (14 sq mi). The Šerkšnys flows into the Nevėžis, a tributary of the Neman.

The Šerkšnys begins near Nociūnai village and flows westwards in the Kėdainiai Industrial Zone surroundings. The Šerkšnys meets the Nevėžis from the left, next to Paobelys village.

The hydronym is derived from Lithuanian adjective šerkšnas ('hoar, hoary, greyish').
