= Pelėdnagiai =

- Town
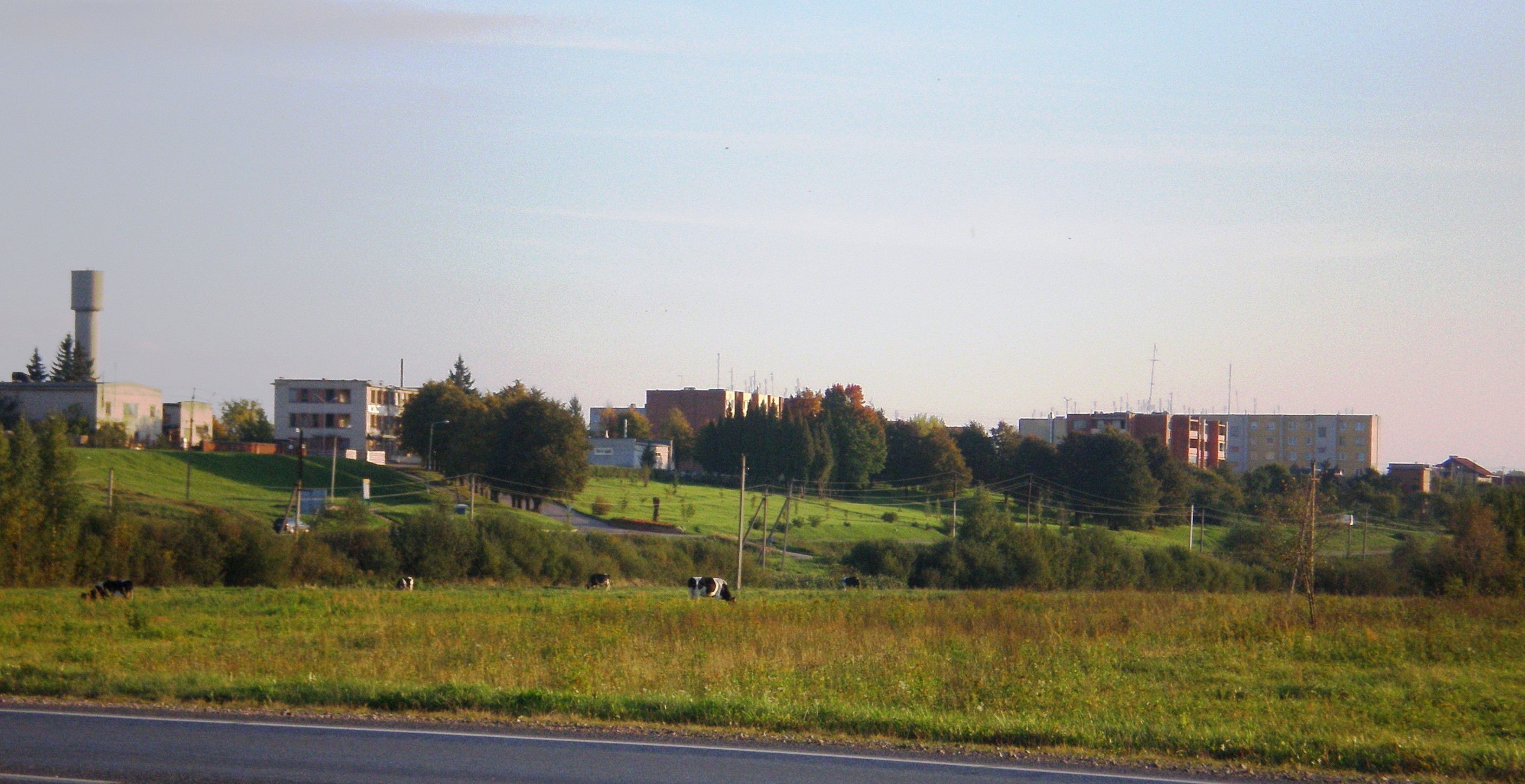

- Location in Lithuania Pelėdnagiai (Lithuania)
- Coordinates: 55°14′49″N 23°57′40″E
- Country: Lithuania
- County: Kaunas County
- Municipality: Kėdainiai district municipality
- Eldership: Pelėdnagiai Eldership
- Capital of: Pelėdnagiai Eldership

Population (2011)
  - Total: 1,016
- Time zone: UTC+2 (EET)
  - Summer (DST): UTC+3 (EEST)

Pelėdnagiai (formerly Russian: Пеладноги, Polish: Pełednogi) is a small town in Kėdainiai district municipality, in Kaunas County, in central Lithuania. According to the 2011 census, the town had a population of 1016 people. It is located 4 kilometres (2.5 mi) from Kėdainiai, on the left bank of the Nevėžis river, by its tributary the Ašarėna. Roads to Kėdainiai, Babtai, Jonava, Šeduva go next to Pelėdnagiai. There is a kindergarten, a library, a culture house, and a cemetery in Pelėdnagiai. The Pelėdnagiai Botanical Sanctuary is located nearby.

== History ==
The name derives from the Lithuanian word pelėdnagis (literally 'one with owl's claws') which means 'ham-fisted, dummy'.

Pelėdnagiai has been known since 1659. There was the Pelėdnagiai manor (some of its buildings are still present nearby the Nevėžis river) and watermill. During the Soviet era Pelėdnagiai largely developed as it was a central settlement of Kėdainiai forestry farm and an administration of the Directorate of Land Development and Building (Lithuanian: Melioracijos statybos valdyba, MSV).

== Demography ==
Historical population

Year	Pop.	±% p.a.
1859	395	—
1902	187	−1.72%
1923	192	+0.13%
1959	234	+0.55%
1970	505	+7.24%

Year	Pop.	±% p.a.
1979	760	+4.65%
1986	975	+3.62%
1989	1,066	+3.02%
2001	1,039	−0.21%
2011	1,016	−0.22%

Source: 1902, 1923, 1959 & 1970, 1979, 1989, 2001, 2011

== Notable people ==
- Vytautas Koncevičius (1941–1991), one of the 13 January Events victims, lived in Pelėdnagiai before his death.

== Images ==
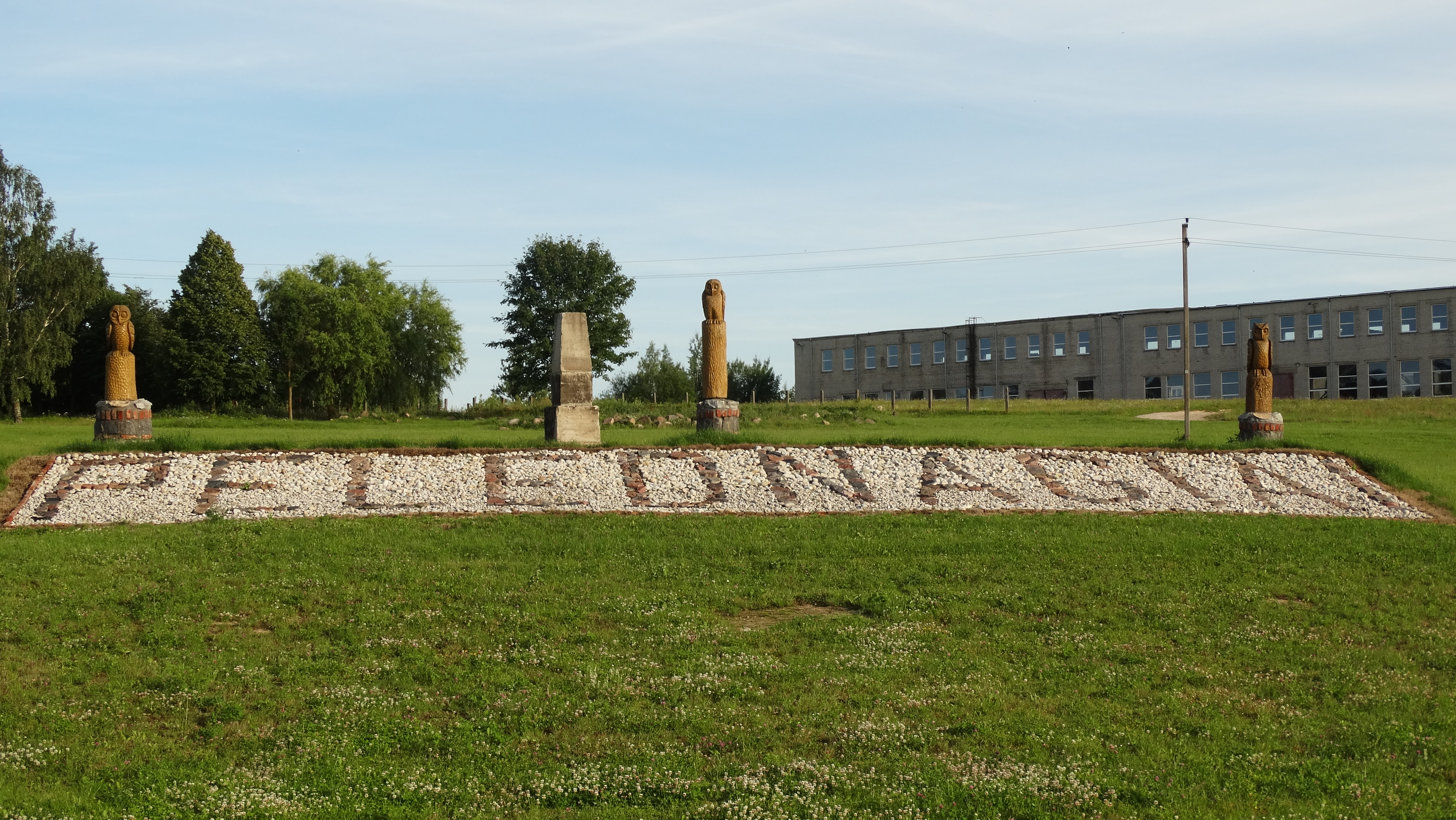
Toponym geosculpture

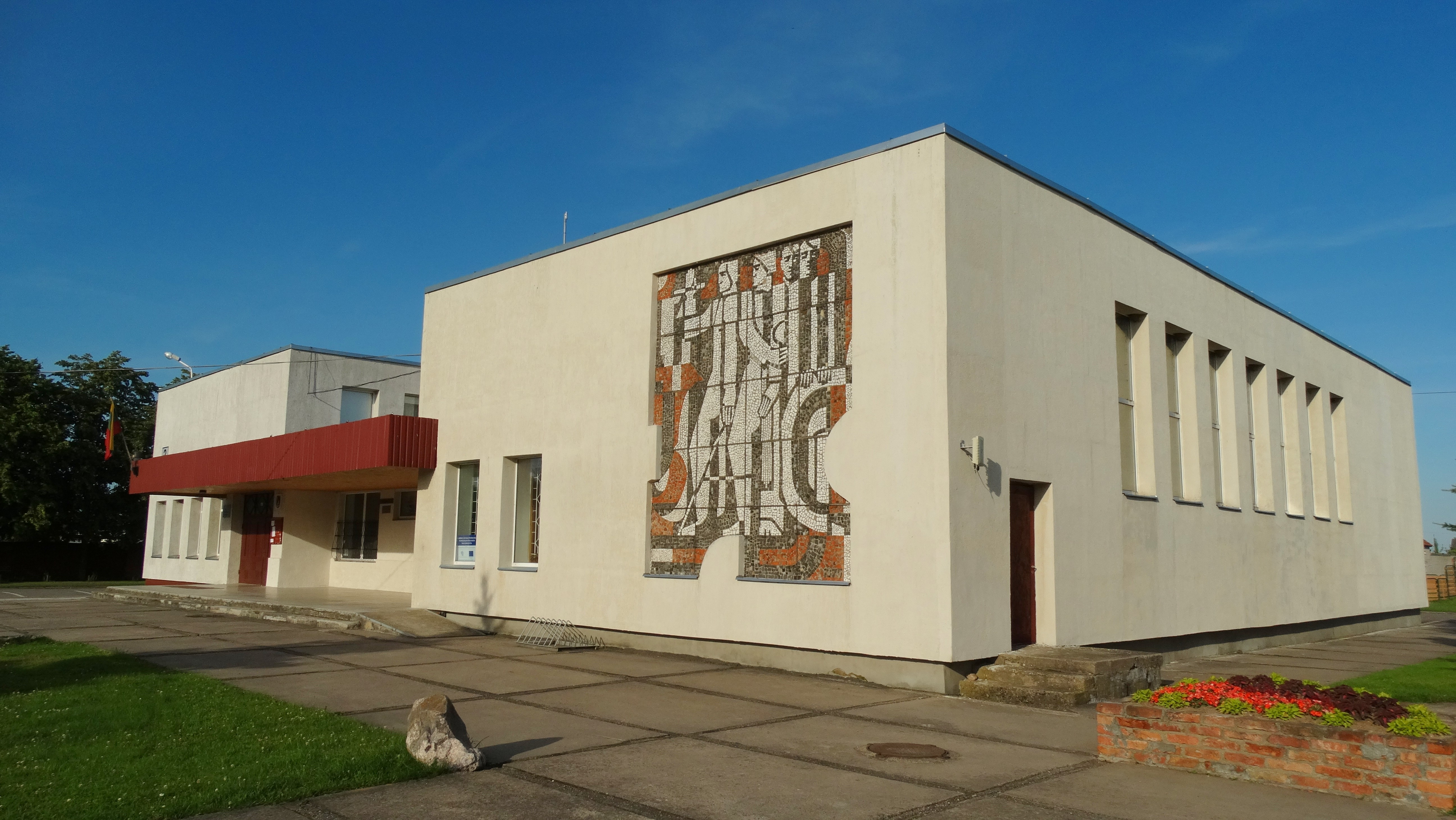
Eldership administration

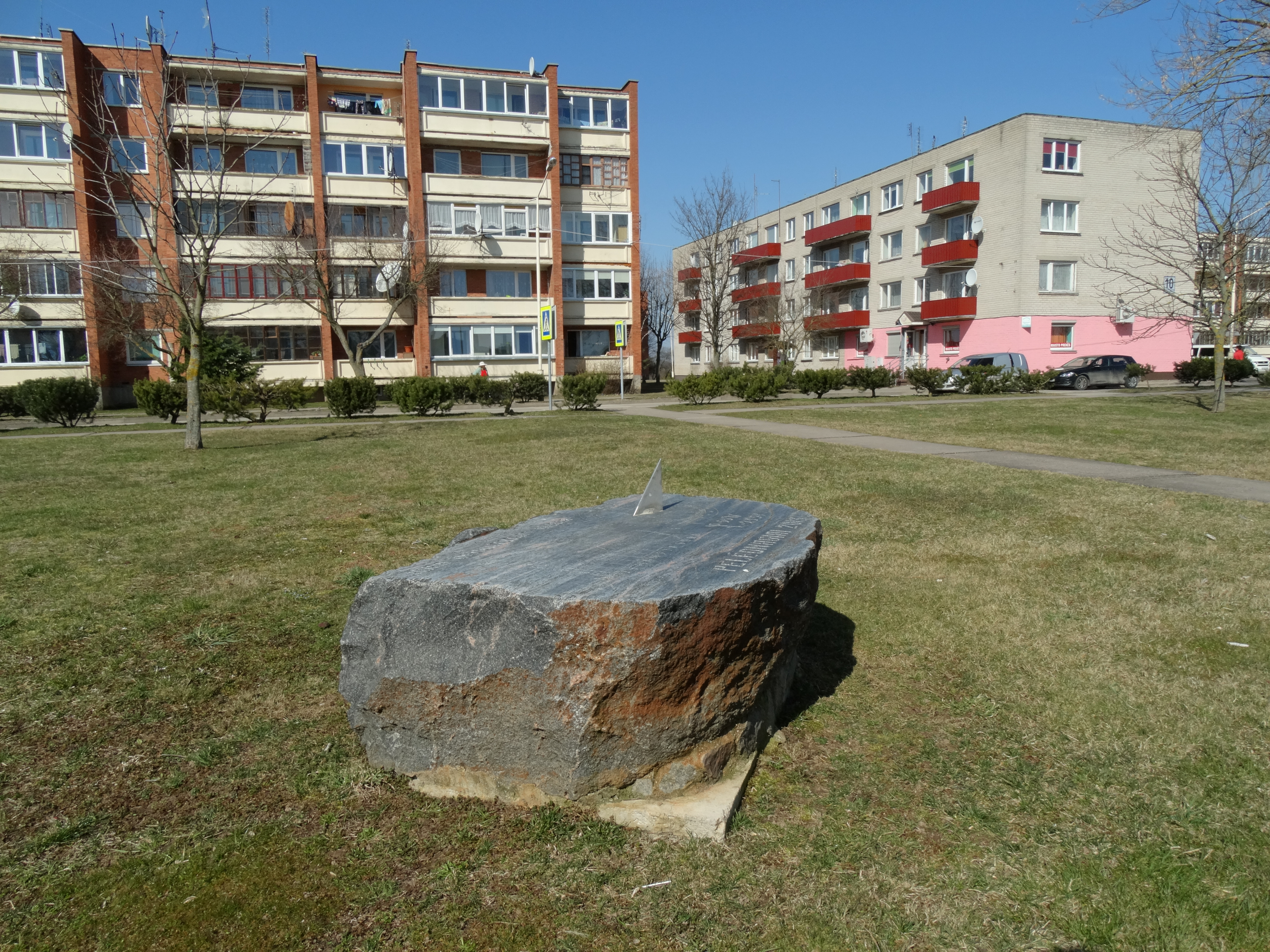
Solar clock in Pelėdnagiai
