= Lithuanian Black-headed =

Breed of sheep

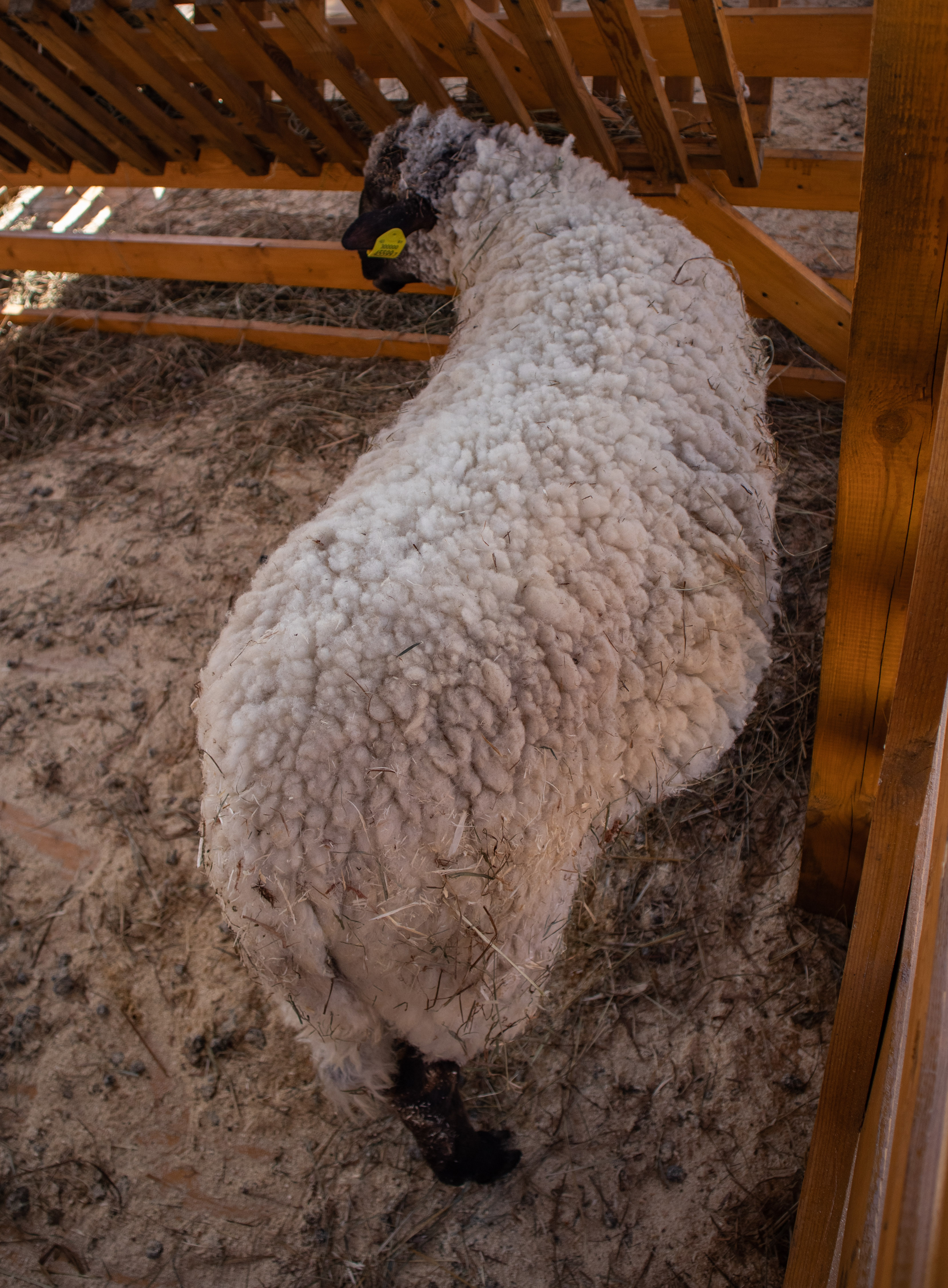
Lithuanian black-headed sheep

The Lithuanian Black-Headed Sheep (Lithuanian: "Lietuvos vietinės šiurkščiavilnės") is a multipurpose breed developed in Lithuania during the mid-20th century.

The breed was created through crossing local sheep with English Shropshire and meaty German black-headed rams, in an attempt to combine the best characteristics of both. These sheep mature early and supply homogenous semi-fine wool. They have short and white wool, while their head, ears, and legs are covered with black hair. The sheep has no horns.

To form productive herds of thoroughbred sheep, state-run Black-Headed sheep breeding nucleus farms were established in Pasvalys in 1952, and in Telšiai in 1956. In 1963 the Šeduva Experimental Farm was launched to preserve the breed. Since its inception the farm has performed scientific research, including evaluation of sheep health and fertility, milking capacity, chemical composition of sheep milk, and quality of wool and meat.

The first Lithuanian Black-Headed breed herd book was issued in 1963, and the last in 1993. As of 2007, thoroughbred Lithuanian Black-Headed sheep were being raised in four farming herds totaling about 470 ewes. Its genetic material is being stored as a resource, and a 2005 United Nations-sponsored initiative purchased the sheep in support of traditional Lithuanian textile arts.
