= Rainer Mahlamäki =

Finnish architect (born 1956)

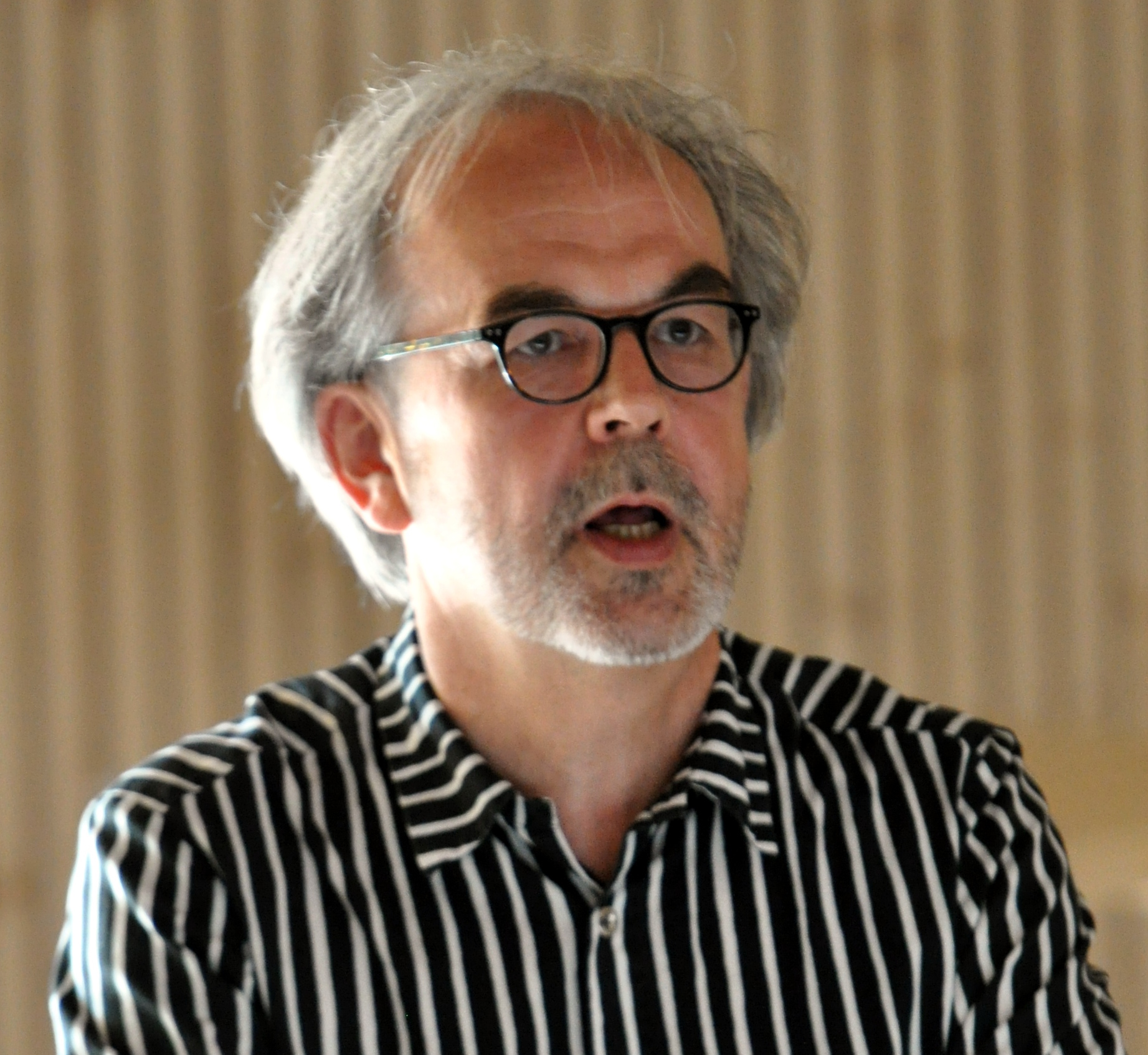
- Born: 12 June 1956 (age 70); Ilmajoki, Finland
- Education: Tampere University of Technology
- Occupation: Architect
- Awards: Finland Prize, Ministry of Education Award, 2008
- Practice: Lahdelma & Mahlamäki Architects
- Buildings: Museum of the History of Polish Jews

Rainer Mahlamäki (born 12 June 1956) is a Finnish architect, president of the Finnish Association of Architects (SAFA) from 2007 to 2011, Professor of Contemporary Architecture at the University of Oulu, and joint partner with Ilmari Lahdelma of the Helsinki-based architecture firm Lahdelma & Mahlamäki Architects, one of the most prolific such firms in Finland. A significant part of their work started as entries in architectural competitions, in which they have received 35 first prizes (and 59 other prizes).

Mahlamäki studied architecture at the Tampere University of Technology, and was awarded the Master of Science in Architecture in 1987. He, along with Lahdelma and 6 others, was a partner in the architecture firm 8 Studio from 1986 to 1993. From 1992 he together with Lahdelma and architect Mikko Kaira founded Kaira-Lahdelma-Mahlamäki Architecture, and from 1997 Mahlamäki and Lahdelma have been in partnership in the firm Lahdelma & Mahlamäki Architects.

Mahlamäki was appointed Professor of Contemporary Architecture at the University of Oulu Department of Architecture in 1997, from 2000 to 2007 he was head of the department and since 2007 vice-head of the department. In 2007 to 2011 he was appointed President of the Finnish Association of Architects (SAFA).

Mahlamäki was the Chair of the Jury for the 2009 International Architecture Awards.

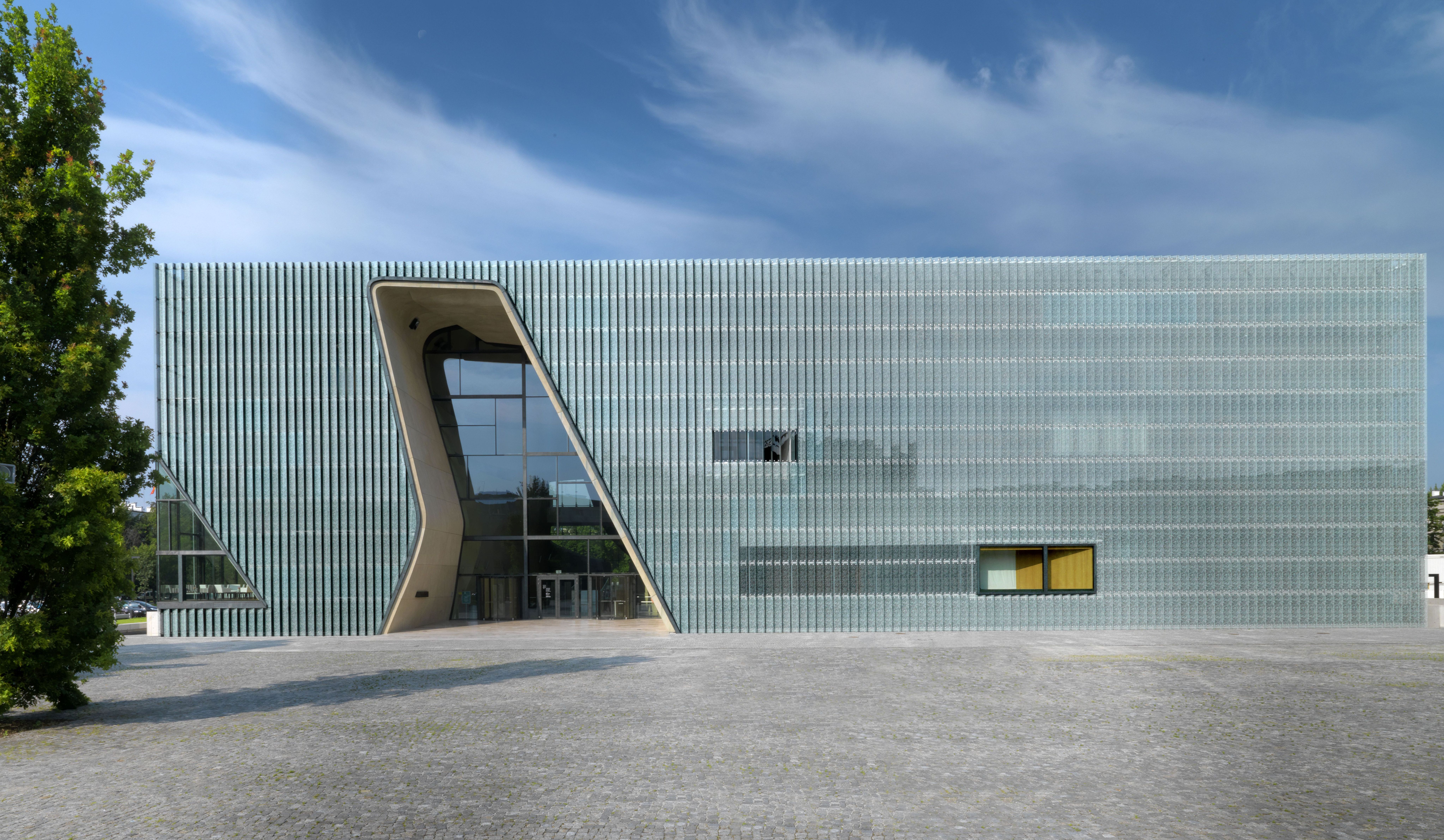
Lahdelma & Mahlamäki, Museum of the History of Polish Jews in Warsaw, Poland (2013).

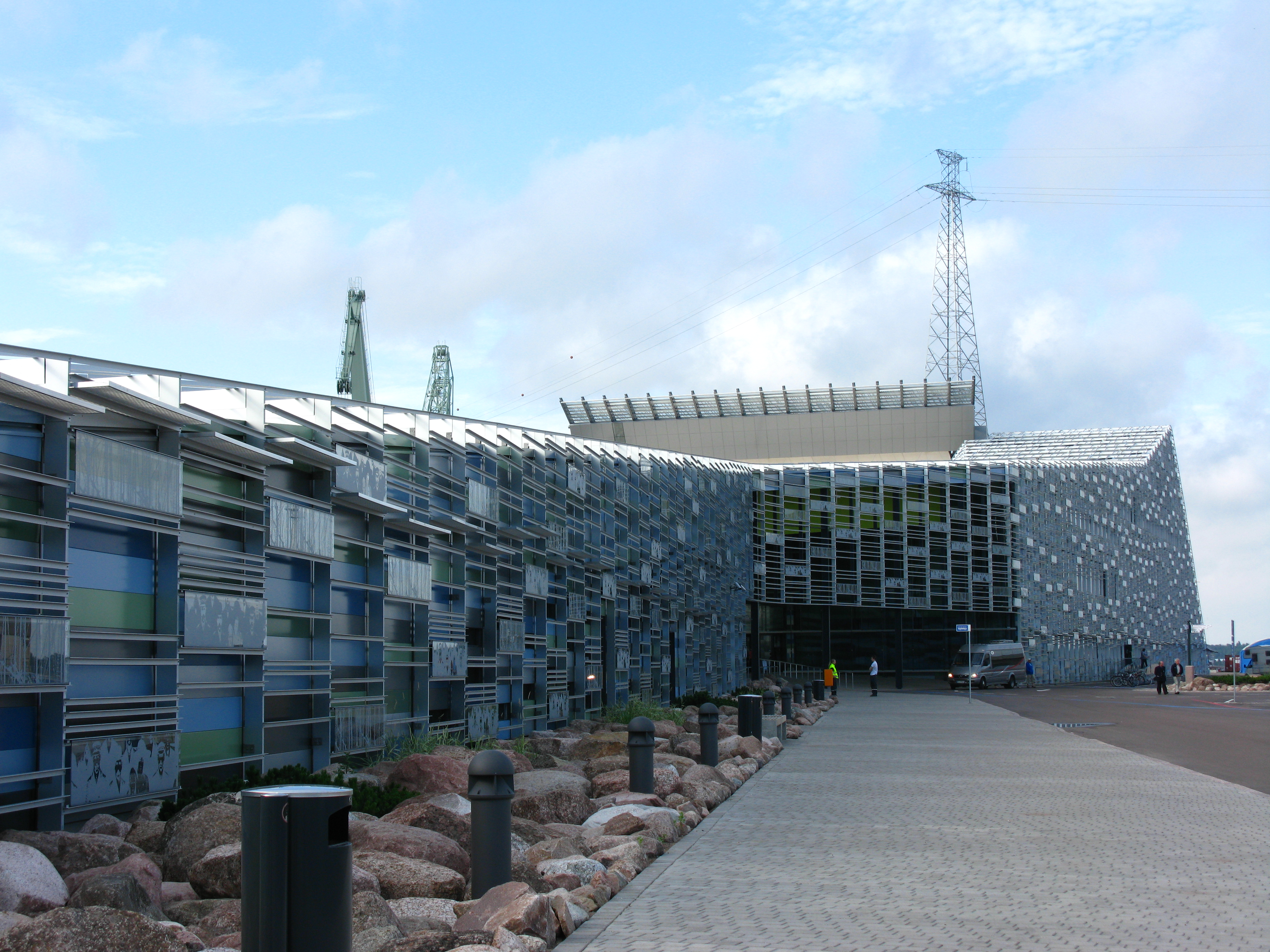
Lahdelma & Mahlamäki, Maritime Centre Vellamo, Kotka, 2008.

== Selection of works by Lahdelma & Mahlamäki Architects ==
The work of the firm Lahdelma & Mahlamäki Architects is generally split between the two partners, though with each having some input in all the works. The style of the firm has been described as contextual, varying dramatically in character depending on the project, from minimalism to expressionism. The contextualism is typified by Lahdelma's design of the Jyväskylä University Teacher Training School (2002) built adjacent to several buildings on the university campus designed by Alvar Aalto. The form of the new building complex was generated by the "sight lines" of the surrounding buildings, resulting in a "fortress-like" appearance.

- The Lost Shtetl Museum, Šeduva, Lithuania, 2025
- Finnish Nature Centre Haltia, Espoo, Finland 2013
- Derby Business Park, Espoo, Finland, 2013
- Helsingin Studio, Residential Building, Helsinki, Finland, 2013
- Museum of the History of Polish Jews, Warsaw, Poland, 2013
- Helsingin Vanhalinna, Residential Building, Helsinki, Finland, 2012
- Meilahti Hospital Area, New Entrance Lobby, Helsinki, Finland, 2010
- Maritime Centre Vellamo, Kotka, Finland, 2008
- Wooden Boat Centre, Kotka, Finland, 2008
- Joensuu Primary School, Joensuu, Finland, 2006
- Evira, Finnish Food Safety Authority, Helsinki, Finland, 2006
- ICT-Building, Turku, 2006
- Helsingin Pasaatituuli, Residential Building, Helsinki, Finland, 2006
- Lusto Finnish Forest Museum, Extension Punkaharju, Finland, 2005
- Lohja City Library, Finland, 2005
- Exactum building, University of Helsinki, Finland, 2004
- Iiris, Office Building and Service Centre for the Visually Impaired, Helsinki, Finland, 2004
- Tapiola Church Yard, Urn Cemetery, Espoo, Finland, 2004
- Rauma Main Library, Rauma, Finland, 2003
- Office Building for Finland Post Corporation, Helsinki, Finland, 2003
- Jyväskylä University Teacher Training School, Jyväskylä, Finland, 2002
- Vaasa City Library, Vaasa, Finland, 2001
- Skanska Ltd. Headquarters, Helsinki, Finland, 2000
- Bulevardin Aaria, Residential Building, Helsinki, Finland, 2000
- Physicum building, University of Helsinki, Finland, 2001
- Folks Arts Centre, Kaustinen, Finland, 1997
- Soininen Primary School, Helsinki, Finland, 1997
- Festia building, Tampere University of Technology, Finland, 1995
- Lusto Finnish Forest Museum, Punkaharju, Finland, 1994

== Awards to Lahdelma & Mahlamäki Architects ==
- Architectural Arts Suomi Award, 1997
- Finland Prize, Ministry of Education Award, 2008

== Gallery of works by Lahdelma & Mahlamäki Architects ==
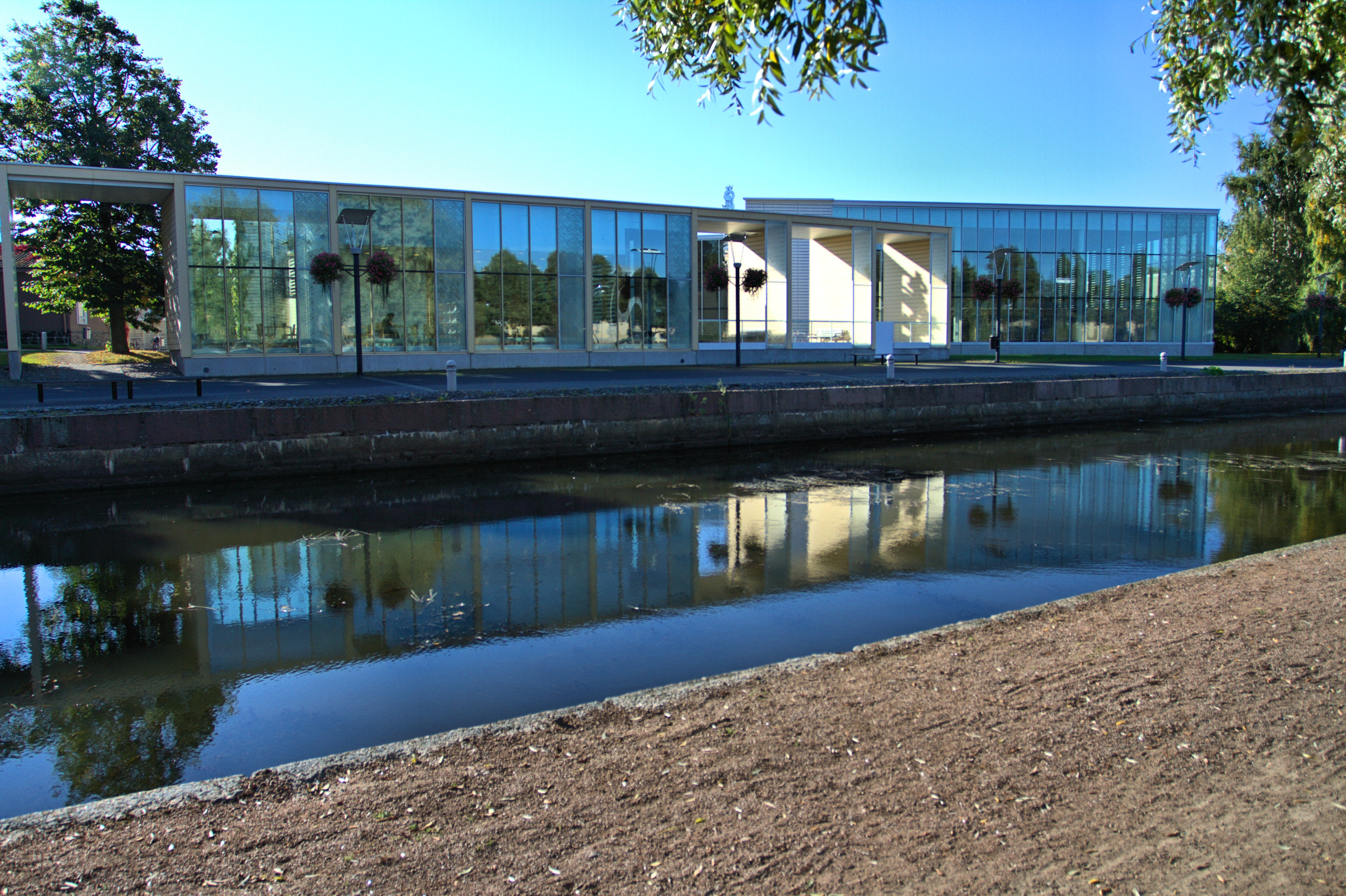
Rauma Library (2003).

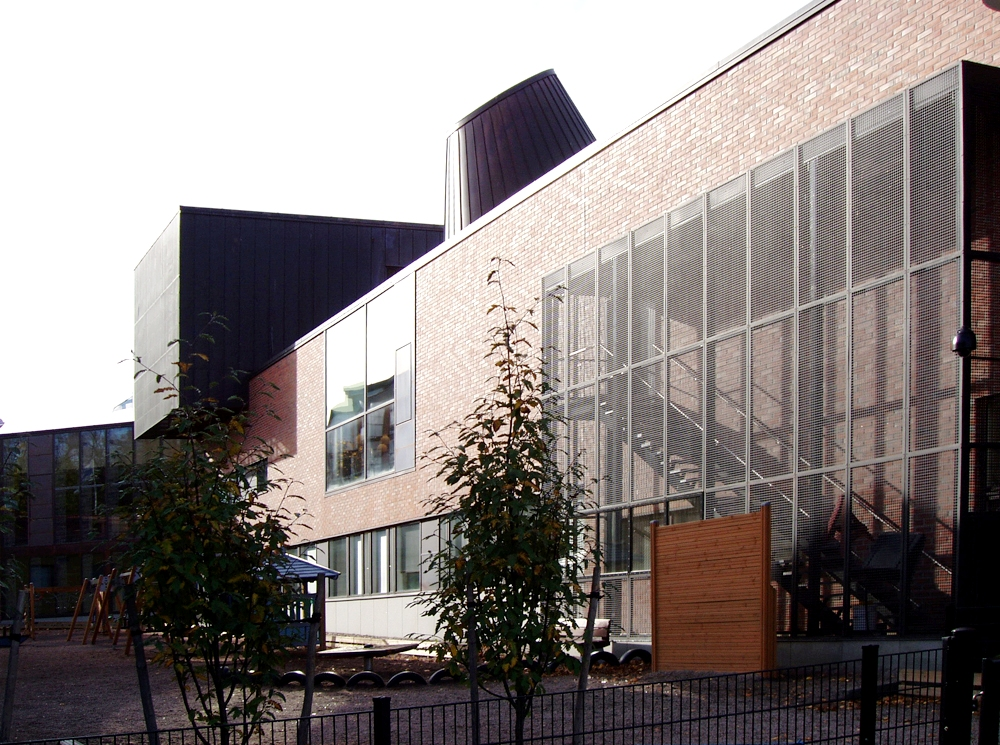
Lohja City Library (2005).

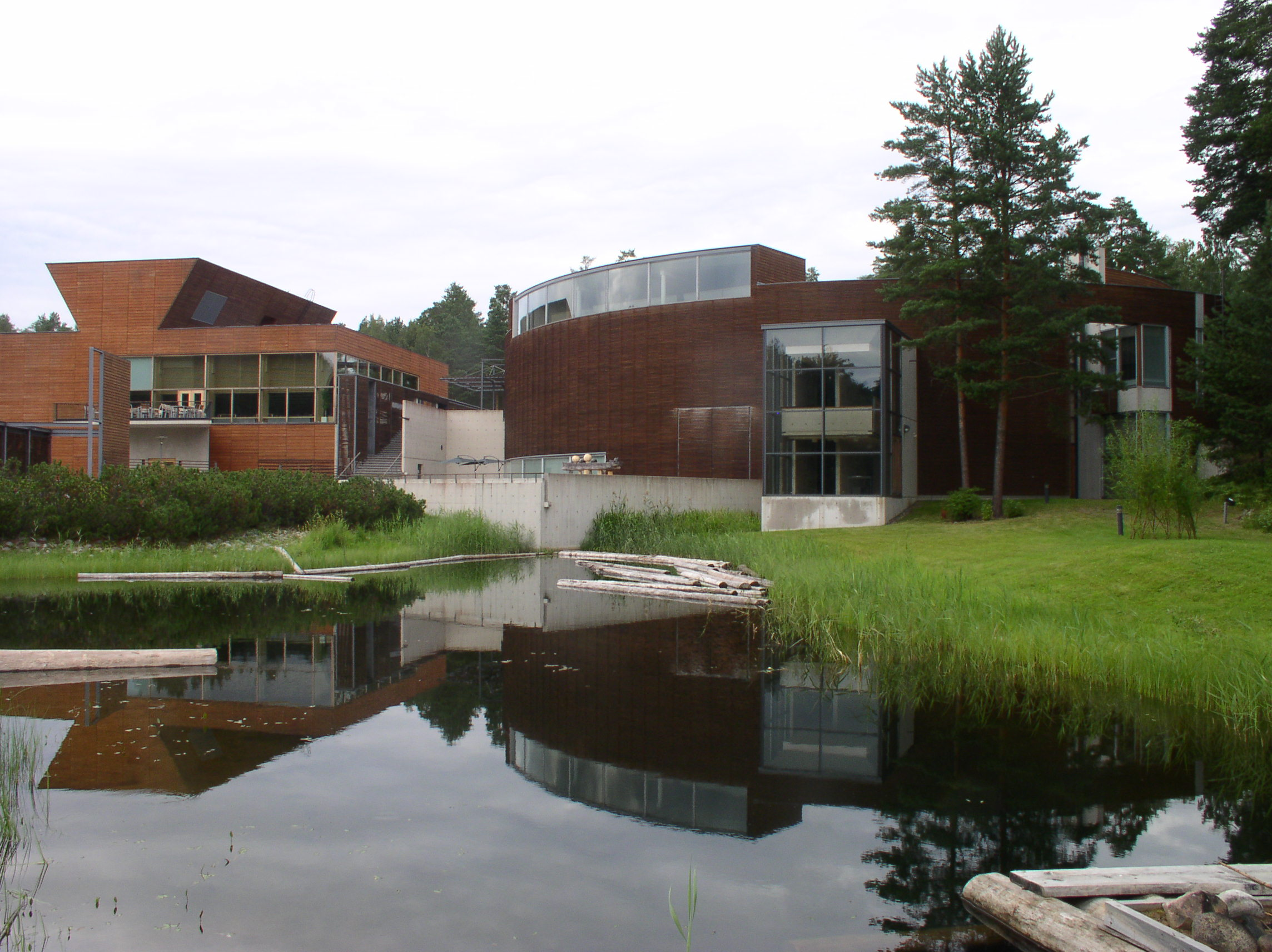
Lusto Finnish Forest Museum, Punkaharju, (1994/2005).

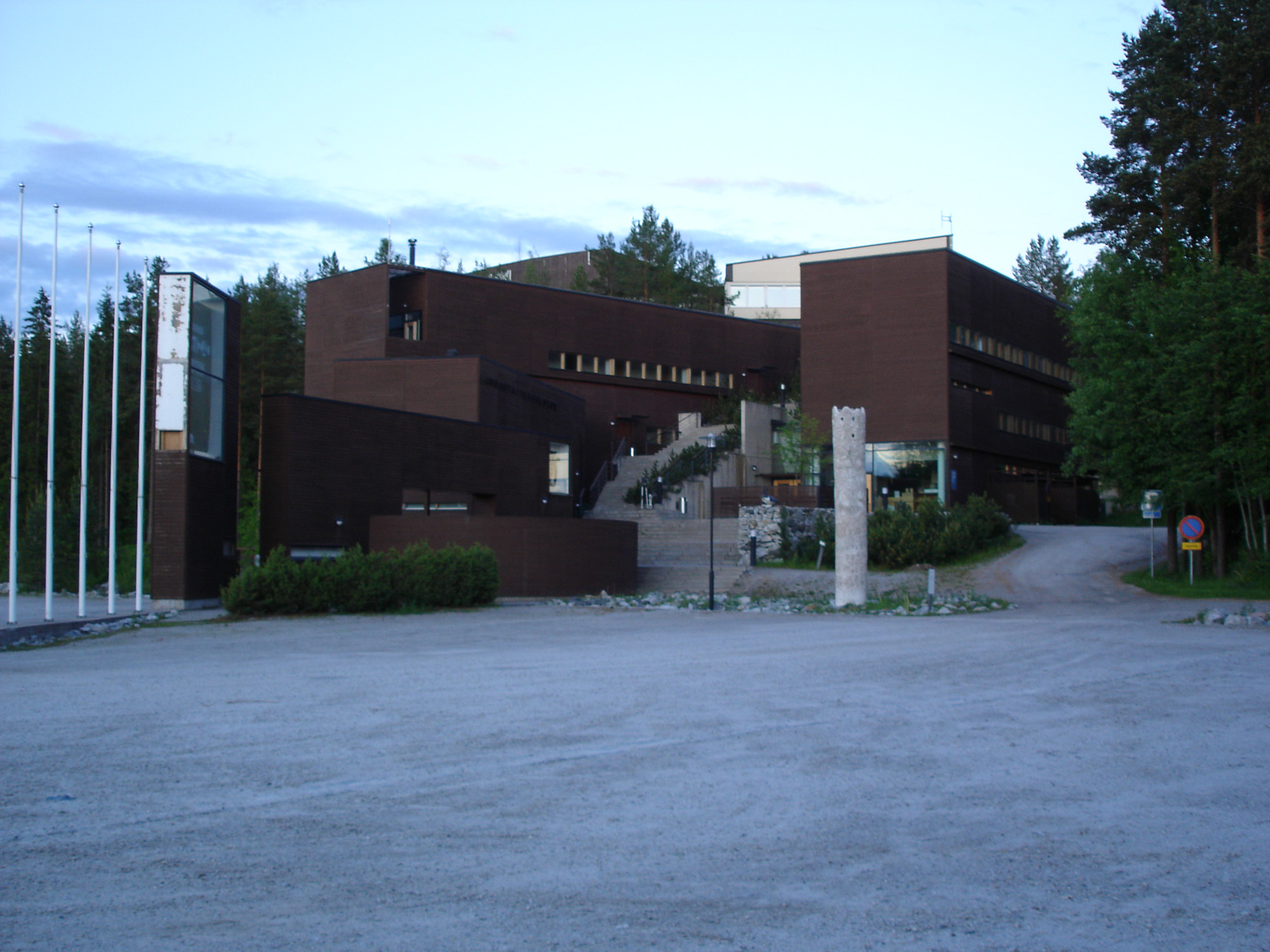
Folks Arts Centre, Kaustinen, (1997).

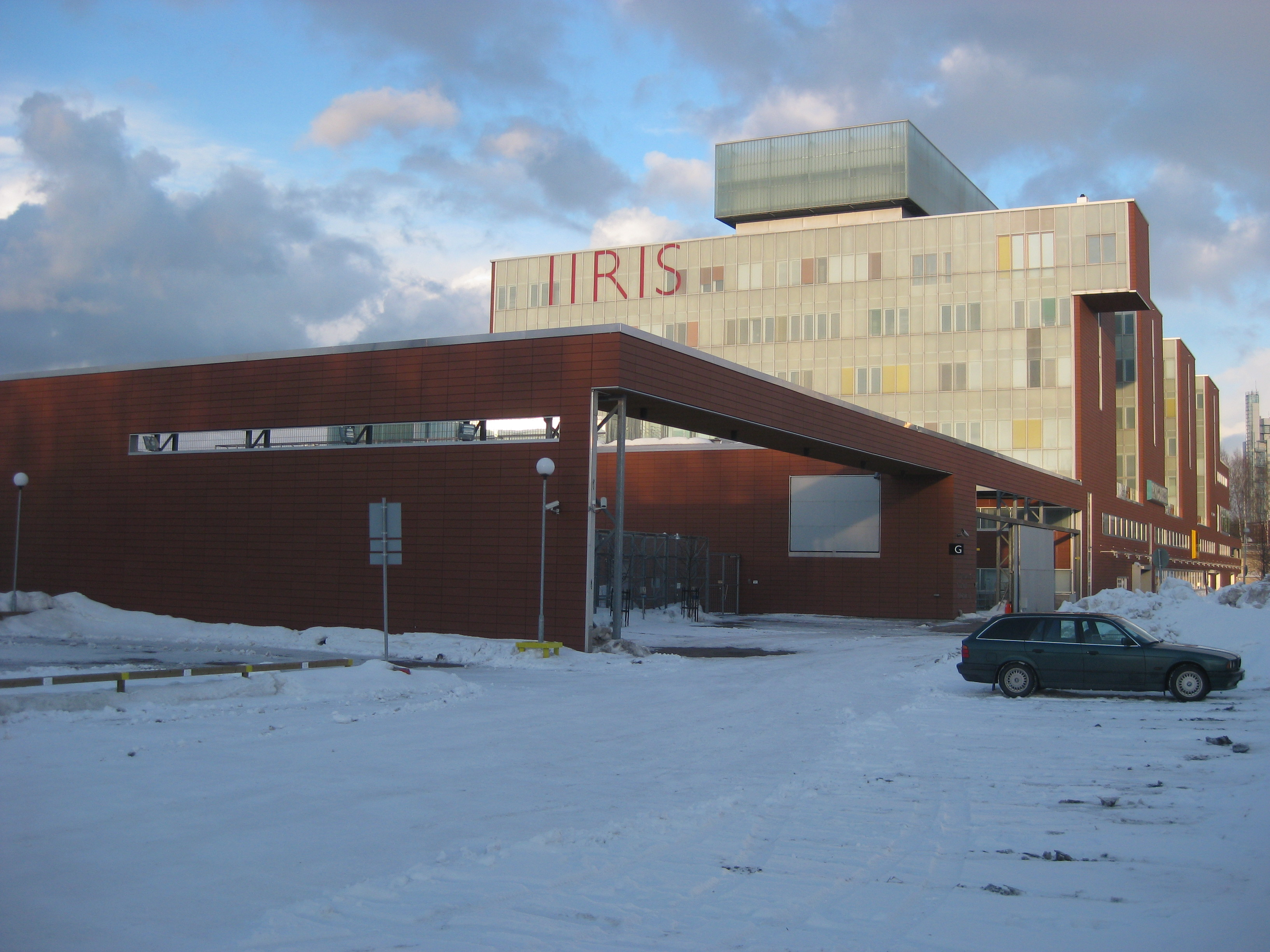
Iiris, Offices and Service Centre for the Visually Impaired, Helsinki (2004)

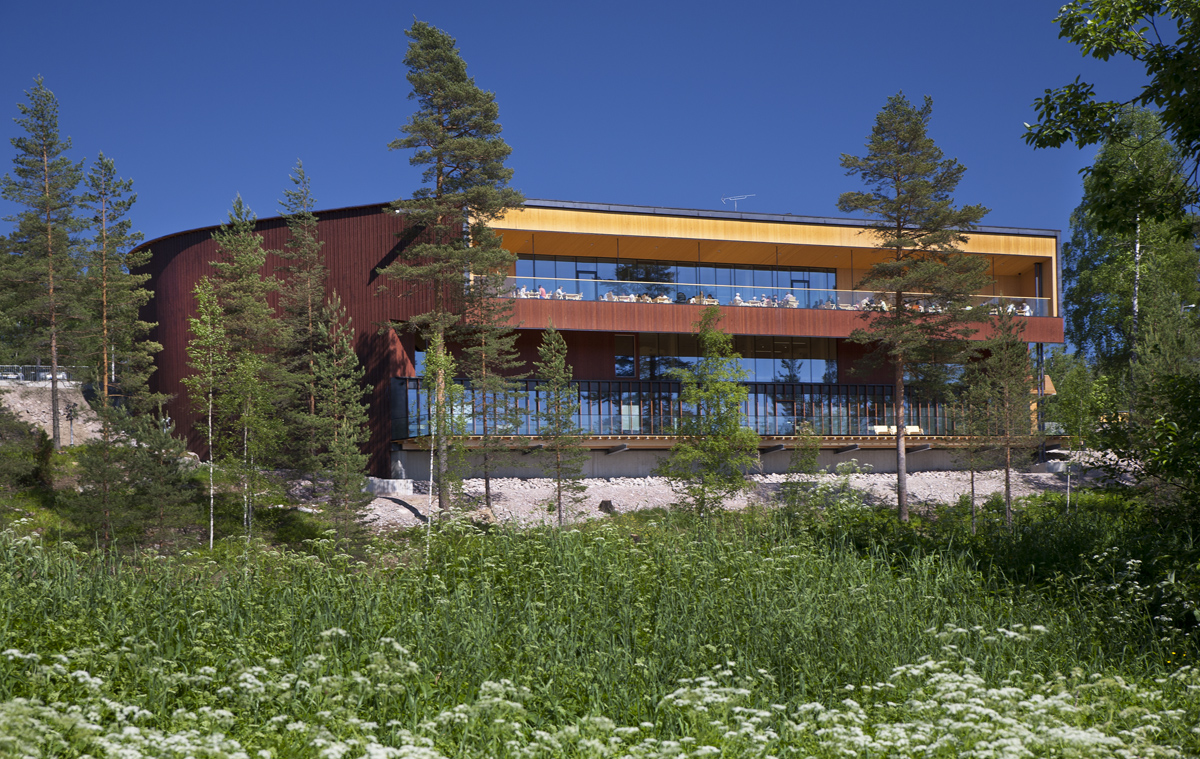
Finnish Nature Centre Haltia, Espoo, (2013)

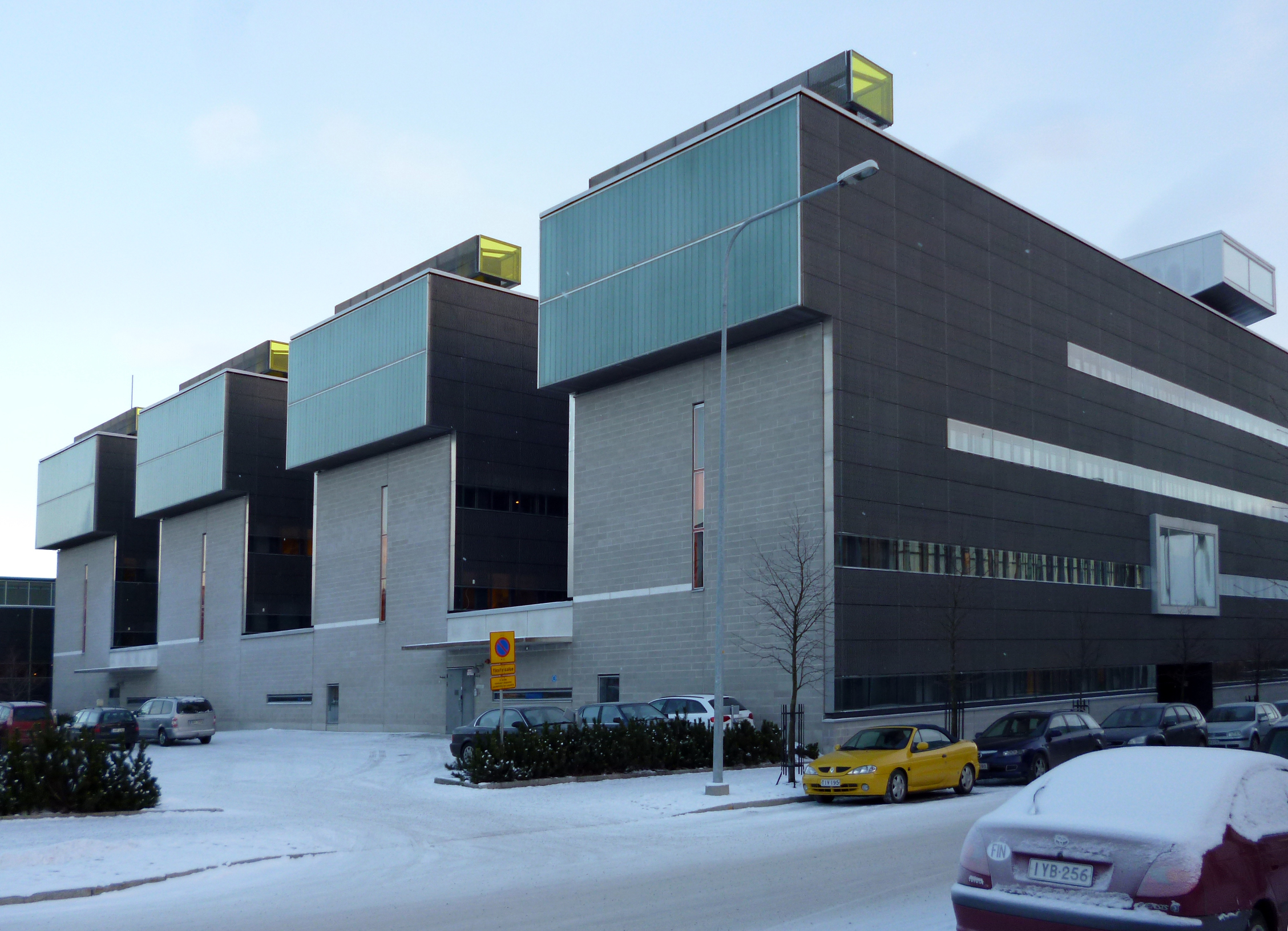
Exactum building, University of Helsinki, (2004)

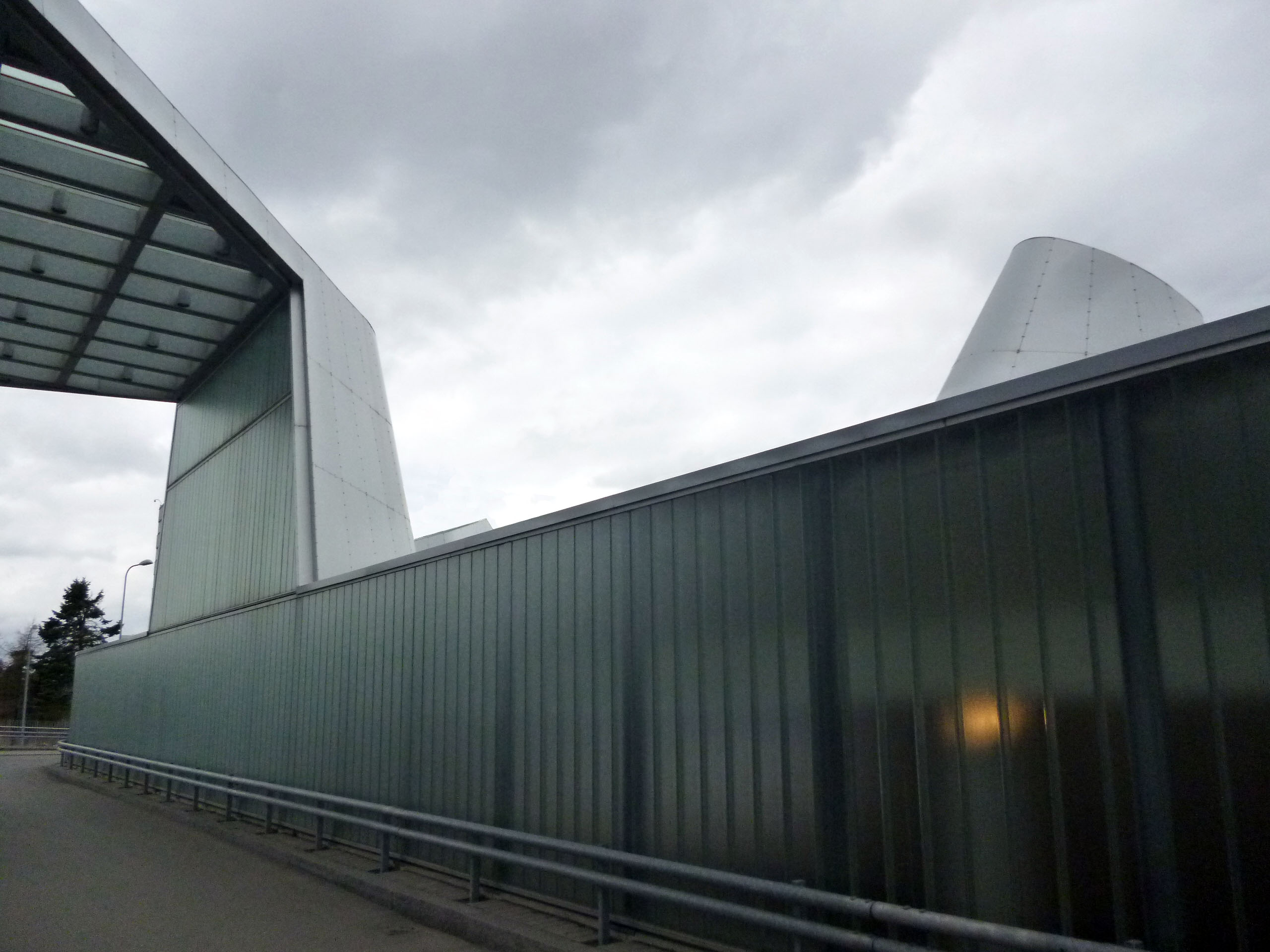
Meilahti Hospital, new entrance, Helsinki (2013)

== See also ==
- Architecture of Finland
