= Šeduva =

- Town
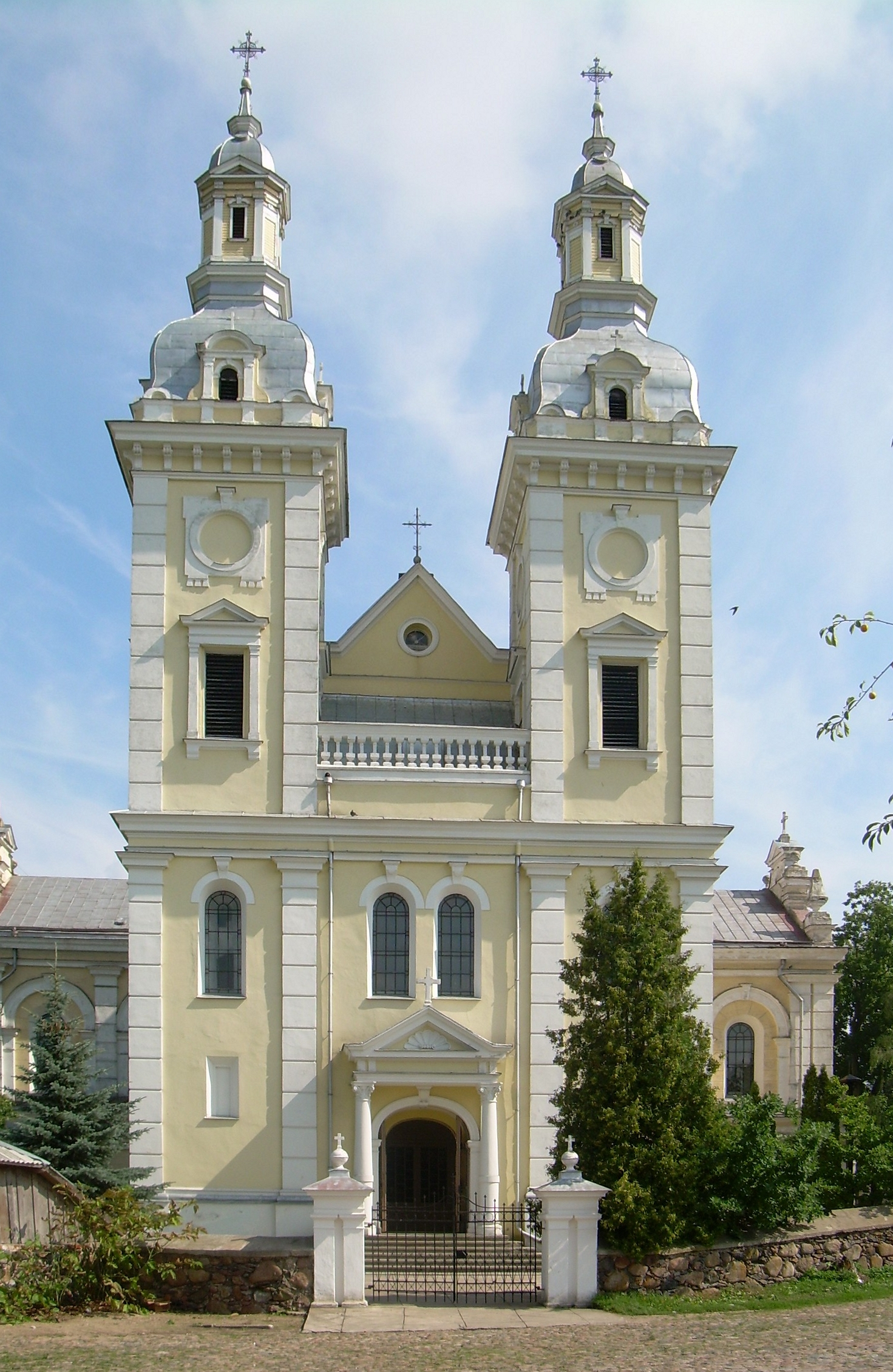

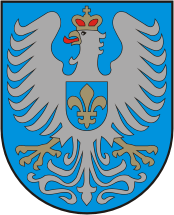
- Coat of arms

- Location of Šeduva
- Coordinates: 55°46′0″N 23°45′0″E
- Country: Lithuania
- Ethnographic region: Aukštaitija
- County: Šiauliai County
- Municipality: Radviliškis district municipality
- Eldership: Šeduva eldership
- Capital of: Šeduva eldership
- First mentioned: 1539
- Granted city rights: 1654

Population (2022)
  - Total: 2,383
- Time zone: UTC+2 (EET)
  - Summer (DST): UTC+3 (EEST)

Šeduva (Polish: Szadów; Yiddish: שאַדעווע, romanized: Shadeve; German: Schadow) is a town in the Radviliškis district municipality, Lithuania. It is located 18 km (11 mi) east of Radviliškis.

== History ==
Šeduva was an agricultural town dealing in cereals, flax and linseed, pigs and geese and horses, at the site of a royal estate and beside a road from Kaunas to Riga. The population from the fifteenth century was Catholic and Jewish. Until then, Lithuania had been the last pagan kingdom in Europe and allowed freedom of worship and toleration of Jews and other religions. The first Catholic shrine of Šeduva, the Church of the Invention of the Holy Cross, was built and the parish founded between 1512 and 1529. The present brick church Cross was built in Šeduva in 1643 with a donation from bishop Jerzy Tyszkiewicz of Vilnius. During the 18th century, the bell tower was added to the structure, with further renovations and extensions in 1905. Baroque and Renaissance architectural styles characterise both the exterior and interior of the church. It has a cruciform plan with an apse, a low sacristy and five altars.

During the 15th century, the region was redefined as the Voivodeship of Trakai and Vilnius. Later it became part of the Grand Duchy of Lithuania until the Union of Lublin in 1569 created the Polish-Lithuanian Commonwealth.

The Šeduva coat of arms was granted on June 25, 1654, by John II Casimir Vasa, King of Poland and Grand Duke of Lithuania and at the same time, the city was granted burger rights at the request of Marie Louise Gonzaga, Queen and Grand Duchess consort. She descended from the Princes of Gonzaga, from Mantua in Italy. The arms of the family showed a black eagle. The small breastshield shows the French fleur-de-lis, because the Gonzaga family was related to the French Royal family. The eagle was made white in reference to the white eagle of Poland.

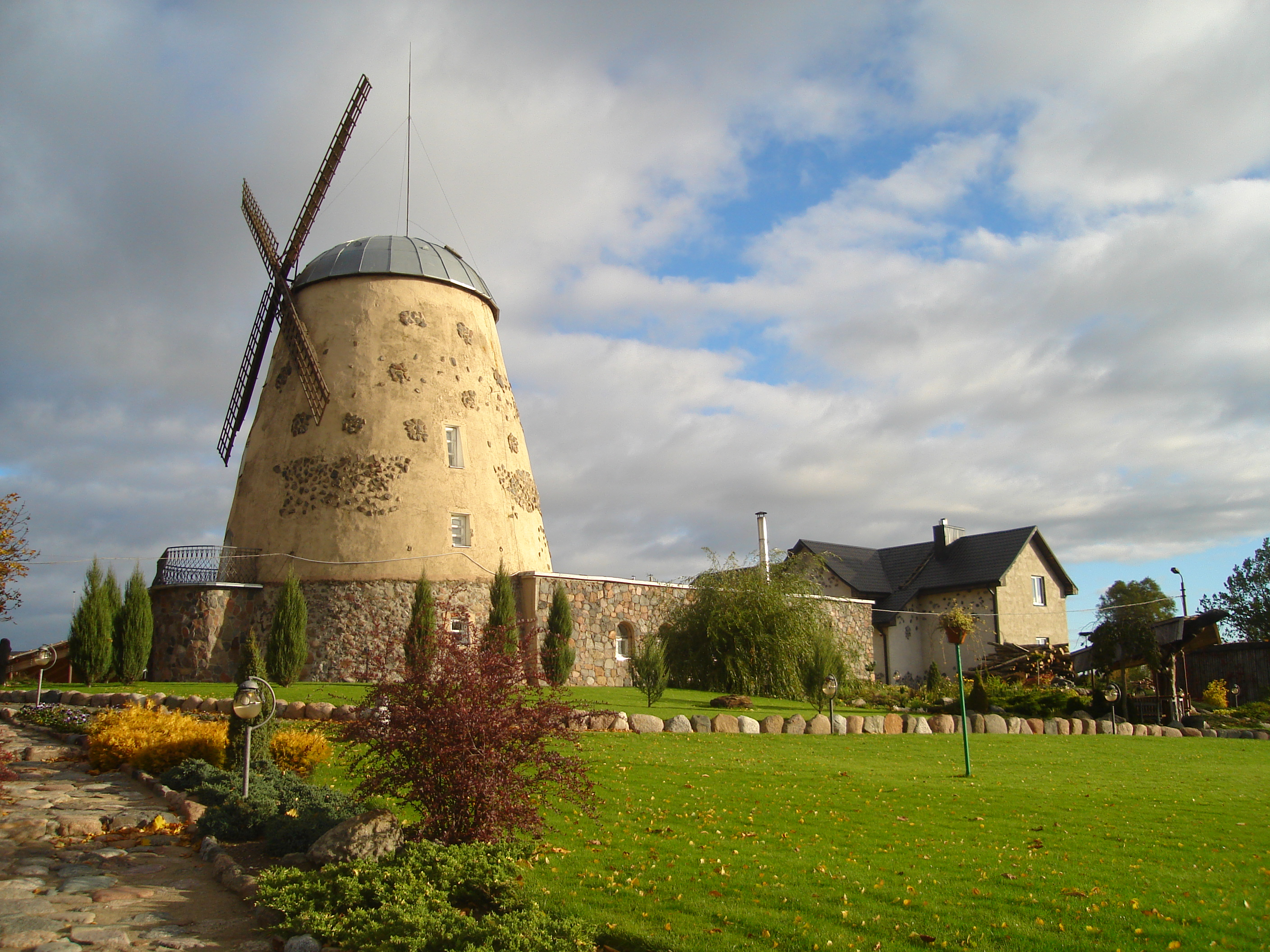
Devil's mill

1792 Stanislaw II August Poniatowski, the last royal proprietor of Šeduva, concluded an agreement with the town's citizens, giving them rights to be excused from labour on the estate for a fee. In 1795, the year of a terrible fire in Šeduva, the town was annexed by Russia as a result of the Third Partition of Polish-Lithuanian Commonwealth. From 1798, Baron Theodore von Ropp did not acknowledge the rights of Šeduva citizens and required of the citizens to perform labour in the town's manor. The citizens petitioned for their rights to the Russian Senate. In 1812, the Senate passed a decision to recognise the former charters of Šeduva.

Between 1696 and 1762, a Jesuit mission, connected with their college at Pašiaušė, was active in the town, operating a lower school with 96 pupils up until 1828. After an insurrection in 1863 (the January Uprising), all parish schools in Šeduva were closed and replaced by public Russian language schools. In the same year, a Russian Orthodox Church, designed by the architect Ustinas Golinevicius, was built, and in 1866 a wooden Synagogue was added near the central market square.

The Molotov–Ribbentrop Pact between Nazi Germany and Communist Russia in August 1939 and the German-Soviet Boundary and Friendship Treaty a month later placed Lithuania under Soviet control. By June 1940, the Soviets had set up a pro-Soviet government and stationed many Red Army troops in Lithuania as part of the Mutual Assistance Pact between the countries. President Antanas Smetona was forced to leave as 15 Red Army divisions came in.

In July 1941, during the Nazi German occupation of Lithuania, a temporary Jewish ghetto was established at the Šeduva airfield. At the end of August 1941, on orders issued by the Germans, 664 Jews were executed over two days in Liaudiškės forest by Šeduva policemen and local Hiwis.

Vladimir Dekanozov and Justas Paleckis controlled the pro-Soviet puppet government, and eventually Lithuania was occupied by the Soviet Union. A Sovietisation programme began immediately. Land, banks and large businesses were nationalised. All religious, cultural, and political organizations were abolished except the Communist Party. 17,000 people were deported to Siberia, where many would perish.

During the years of Lithuanian anti-Soviet partisan resistance (1944–1953) in Šeduva and neighbouring districts, Lithuanian Žalioji rinktinė (The Green Squad), belonging to partisans' Algimantas military district was active.

== Industry ==
Šeduva is famous for sheep farming, Lithuanian Black-headed sheep are grown. The state enterprise Šeduvos avininkystė is responsible for the preservation of the genetic stock of Lithuanian Black-Headed sheep.

== Culture ==
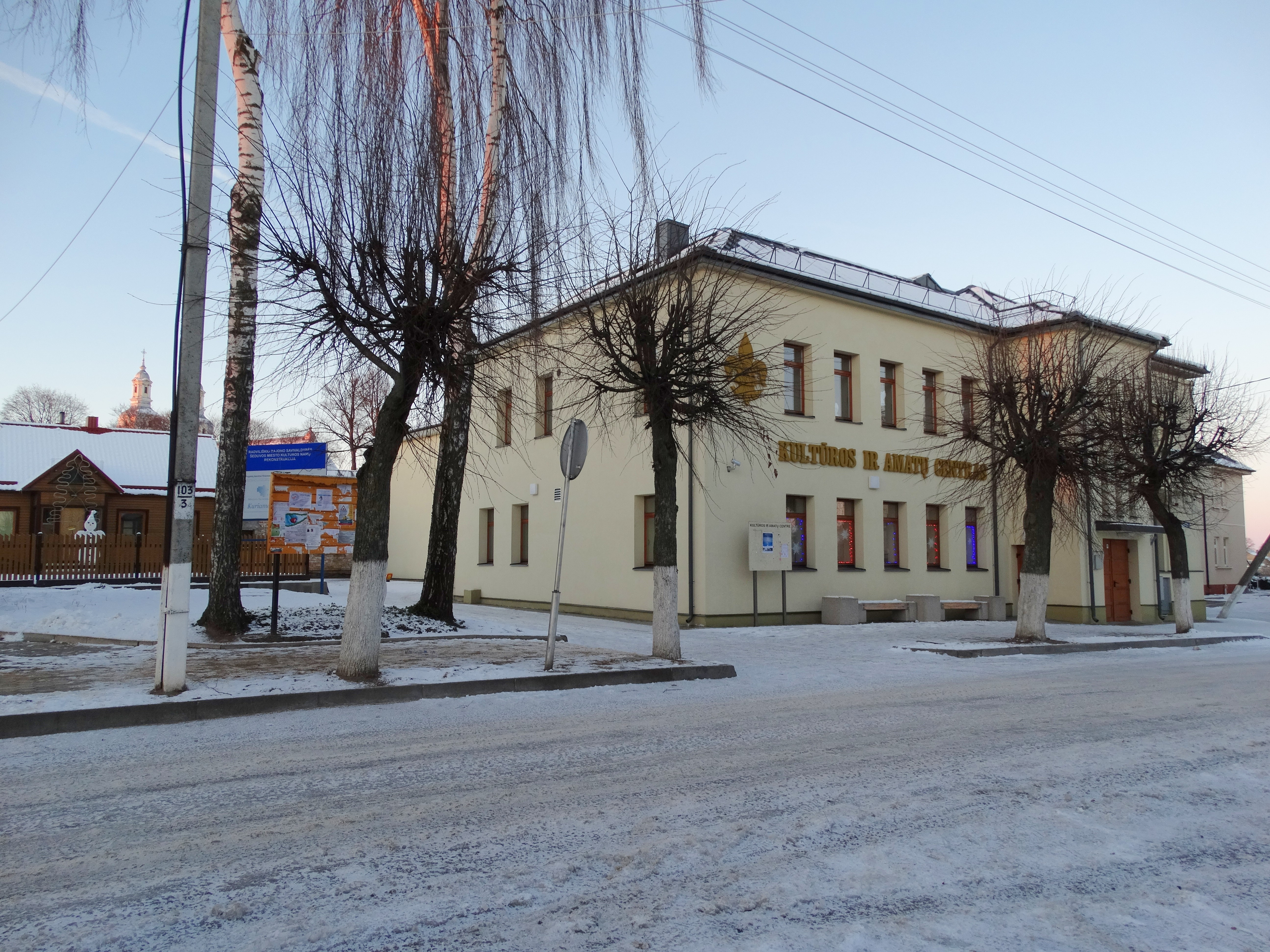
Culture Center

=== Lost Shtetl Museum ===
The Lost Shtetl Museum is a privately funded museum of the history of Jewish towns (shtetls) that opened in September 2025. Its aim is to tell the history of the Jews of Šeduva before the Second World War and to present the traditions, businesses and cultural phenomena that are characteristic of other Lithuanian shtetls of that time. With the estimated floor space of 2.7 thousand square meters, the museum's building is designed by Finnish architect Rainer Mahlamäki while the interior of permanent exhibition is overseen by the Ralph Appelbaum Associates.
