= Rinktinė =

Lithuanian partisan military unit type

Rinktinė (transl. territorial unit) was a type of Lithuanian partisan military unit that existed from the end of 1944 to 1954, who fought against the second Soviet occupation of Lithuania. Instead of destroyed or disintegrated rinktinė, new ones were founded, often with different names.

Due to the difficulties of guerrilla warfare, as well as for tactical reasons, the territorial units' boundaries changed, so, depending on the case, they operated in one county, a part of thereof, or several neighboring counties. Sometimes territorial units were transferred from one military district to another. Territorial units, thought not all, published their own press.

== Beginning ==
The first rinktinė were formed in Southern and Eastern Lithuania at the end of 1944. At the beginning of the partisan war in Lithuania, some territorial units formed and operated independently (e.g. Perkūnas, Deer, Vytautas in the Tauras military district).

== Composition ==
A rinktinė was made up of several squads, companies, battalions, districts. Most frequently, it included several companies. In turn, several territorial units made up a military district (Lithuanian: Apygarda). After the founding of the Lithuanian Freedom Fighters Union in 1949, a territorial unit was composed of several homelands (Lithuanian: Tėvūnija).

Territorial units differed in the number of fighters (from roughly 50 to about 200 people). Sometimes, they were 700-strong. They were active anywhere from several to 8 years.

== Command ==
The military district's commander appointed the territorial unit's commander. The people chosen were either staff officers or distinguished commanders of companies or other formations. Generally, these were Lithuanian Army officers and school teachers.

== List of territorial units ==
The following rinktinė were active at various times:

| Formation name | Date created | | Date formation ceased to exist | | Unit insignia | Part of Military District (MD) | Notable battles | Notes | Source(s) |
| Formation name | Month | Year | Month | Year | | | | | |
|---|---|---|---|---|---|---|---|---|---|
| Duke Margis | May | 1947 | Autumn | 1950 | | Algimantas | | | |
| Šarūnas | January | 1945 | November | 1950 | | Algimantas | | | |
| Green | March | 1946 | November | 1953 | | Algimantas | Ažagai | | |
| Dzūkai | June | 1945 | August 16 | 1954 | | A or Algirdas MD; since May 1946: Dainava MD | | | |
| Šarūnas | April | 1945 | December 26 | 1951 | | A or Algirdas MD; since May 1946: Dainava MD | Liepakojai, Kalniškės | | |
| Iron Wolf | May | 1945 | August | 1946 | | A or Algirdas MD; since May 1946: Dainava MD | | | |
| Merkys | June | 1945 | September | 1947 | | A or Algirdas MD; since May 1946: Dainava MD | Varčios Forest, Liberation of Merkinė | | |
| Kazimieraitis | September 25 | 1945 | February | 1952 | | A or Algirdas MD; since May 1946: Dainava MD | | A (Note: Kazimieraitis TU was formed on the basis of Merkys TU.) | |
| A | December | 1945 | September | 1948 | | Grand Fight | | A (Note: Both were united into Grand Fight MD, which operated as the Grand Fight TU until early 1945.) | |
| B | December 1 | 1945 | November 25 | 1950 | | Grand Fight | | A | |
| Krikštaponis | April 20 | 1949 | January | 1951 | | Vytis | | | |
| Moose | April 20 | 1949 | January | 1951 | | Vytis | | | |
| Gediminas | January | 1951 | April 17 | 1953 | | Vytis | | | |
| Falcon | May 23 | 1945 | July | 1945 | | Vytautas | | | |
| Tiger | November 20 | 1944 | June | 1952 | | Vytautas | Kiauneliškis | | |
| Bear | December 15 | 1944 | April | 1951 | | Vytautas | Antazavė Pinewood | | |
| Lion (Note: Until June 1946, Šarūnas.) | June | 1946 | May | 1952 | | Vytautas | | | |
| Tumas-Vaižgantas | November | 1950 | October | 1952 | | Vytautas | | | |
| Iron Wolf | October | 1945 | April | 1953 | | Tauras | Būdininkai, Palios–Žuvintas, Raišupis | | |
| Žalgiris (Note: Vytautas Territorial Unit was known as the Deer Territorial Unit from 15 August 1945 to 31 January 1946) | August 15 | 1945 | July | 1952 | | Tauras | Opšrūtai | | |
| Vytautas | June 25 | 1945 | January 21 | 1952 | | Tauras | | | |
| Gediminas | April | 1945 | August | 1946 | | Tauras | | | |
| Birutė | September 24 | 1947 | February 28 | 1949 | | Tauras | | | |
| Šarūnas | January | 1945 | November | 1950 | | Tauras | | | |
| Patrimpas | August | 1945 | October 22 | 1945 | | Tauras | | | |
| Kęstutis | | 1947 | | 1949 | | Tauras | | | |
| Seinai | July | 1945 | July | 1946 | | Tauras | | | |
| Altar (Note: Until July 1947, Lydis. From summer 1948, Butigeidis.) | September | 1946 | July 8 | 1948 | | Kęstutis | | | |
| Butigeidis | July | 1948 | June 13 | 1954 | | Kęstutis | | | |
| Vaidotas | Summer | 1946 | August 5 | 1953 | | Kęstutis | | | |
| Lydis | Early | 1945 | July | 1947 | | Kęstutis | | | |
| Naras (Note: Renamed to Vaidotas in late 1947.) | December | 1946 | July | 1947 | | Kęstutis | | | |
| LLA's March district (Note: Renamed to Lukšys Territorial Unit in 1946.) | | 1945 | | 1946 | | Kęstutis | | | |
| Amber | February | 1948 | March | 1949 | | Kęstutis | | | |
| Weasel (Note: After the Battle of Pyragiai, Weasel Territorial Unit was renamed to Boar TU from August 1946. From November 1946 to June 1947 – Volunteer's TU. From July 1947 to January 1948 – Book smuggler's TU. From February 1948 to March 1949 – Amber TU. From April 1949 to late 1951 – Birutė TU.) | July 22 | 1945 | Late | 1951 | | Kęstutis | Pyragiai | | |
| Squirrel (Note: Renamed to Duke Žvelgaitis TU from April 1948.) | October | 1946 | May | 1952 | | Resurrection | | | |
| Vytautas the Great (Note: Also known as Sapling TU from 1947-1948.) | January | 1946 | April | 1948 | | Resurrection | | | |
| Lithuanian Green | April | 1948 | November | 1950 | | Resurrection | | | |
| Lukšys (Note: From March 1946 to February 1952, Maironis TU.) | March | 1946 | March | 1953 | | Resurrection | | | |
| Alka | October | 1945 | | 1949 | | Žemaičiai | | | |
| Sword | November 15 | 1945 | | 1953 | | Žemaičiai | | | |
| Šatrija | August | 1945 | March | 1953 | | Žemaičiai | | | |

== Bibliography ==
- Bernotas, Darius (2014). Lithuanian Freedom Fighters' Tactics: Resisting The Soviet Occupation 1944-1953. ISBN 9781782897088.

=== Universal Lithuanian Encyclopedia ===
- Gečiauskas, Geistautas (2018a). "Šarūno rinktinė". vle.lt (in Lithuanian).
- Gečiauskas, Geistautas (2018b). "Geležinio Vilko rinktinė". vle.lt (in Lithuanian).
- Gečiauskas, Geistautas (2018c). "Merkio rinktinė". vle.lt (in Lithuanian).
- Gečiauskas, Geistautas (2018d). "Gedimino rinktinė". vle.lt (in Lithuanian).
- Gečiauskas, Geistautas (2018e). "Sakalo rinktinė". vle.lt (in Lithuanian).
- Gečiauskas, Geistautas (2018f). "Vaižganto rinktinė". vle.lt (in Lithuanian).
- Gečiauskas, Geistautas (2018g). "Šarūno rinktinė". vle.lt (in Lithuanian).
- Gečiauskas, Geistautas (2018h). "Seinų rinktinė". vle.lt (in Lithuanian).
- Gečiauskas, Geistautas (2018i). "Lietuvos žalioji rinktinė". vle.lt (in Lithuanian).
- Gečiauskas, Geistautas (2018j). "Šatrijos rinktinė". vle.lt (in Lithuanian).
- Gečiauskas, Geistautas; Rimkus, Henrikas (2018). "Kazimieraičio rinktinė". vle.lt (in Lithuanian).
- Girdzijauskas, Petras (2018). "Lydžio rinktinė". vle.lt (in Lithuanian).
- Jankauskienė, Edita (2018a). "Žalioji rinktinė". vle.lt (in Lithuanian).
- Jankauskienė, Edita (2018b). "Vaidoto rinktinė". vle.lt (in Lithuanian).
- Jankauskienė, Edita (2018c). "Žebenkšties rinktinė". vle.lt (in Lithuanian).
- Kašėta, Algis (2011-12-08). "rinktinė". vle.lt (in Lithuanian).
- Kuodytė, Dalia (2018). "Alkos rinktinė". vle.lt (in Lithuanian).
- Malinauskaitė, Aurelija (2018a). "Voverės rinktinė". vle.lt (in Lithuanian).
- Malinauskaitė, Aurelija (2018b). "Lukšio rinktinė". vle.lt (in Lithuanian).
- Malinauskaitė, Aurelija (2018c). "Vytauto Didžiojo rinktinė". vle.lt (in Lithuanian).
- Rimkus, Henrikas (2018-07-27). "Dzūkų rinktinė". vle.lt (in Lithuanian).
- Sajauskas, Justinas (2018a). "Vytauto rinktinė". vle.lt (in Lithuanian).
- Sajauskas, Justinas (2018b). "Tauro apygarda". vle.lt (in Lithuanian).
- Šidlauskas, Gintaras (2018). "Kardo apygarda". vle.lt (in Lithuanian).
- Tutlys, Sigitas (2018a). "Gedimino rinktinė". vle.lt (in Lithuanian).
- Tutlys, Sigitas (2018b). "Kunigaikščio Žvelgaičio rinktinė". vle.lt (in Lithuanian).
- Tutlys, Sigitas (2019a). "Kunigaikščio Margio rinktinė". vle.lt (in Lithuanian).
- Tutlys, Sigitas (2019b). "Krikštaponio rinktinė". vle.lt (in Lithuanian).
- Ulevičius, Bonifacas (2018a). "Geležinio vilko rinktinė". vle.lt (in Lithuanian).
- Ulevičius, Bonifacas (2018b). "Birutės rinktinė". vle.lt (in Lithuanian).
- Vaičiūnas, Gintaras (2018-04-18). "Briedžio rinktinė". vle.lt (in Lithuanian).
- Vilutienė, Aldona (2018a). "Šarūno rinktinė". vle.lt (in Lithuanian).
- Vilutienė, Aldona (2018b). "Tigro rinktinė". vle.lt (in Lithuanian).
- Vilutienė, Aldona (2018c). "Lokio rinktinė". vle.lt (in Lithuanian).
- Vilutienė, Aldona (2018d). "Liūto rinktinė". vle.lt (in Lithuanian).
- Vilutienė, Aldona (2018e). "Žalgirio rinktinė". vle.lt (in Lithuanian).
- Gaškaitė-Žemaitienė, Nijolė (2001). "A rinktinė". vle.lt (in Lithuanian).
- Gaškaitė-Žemaitienė, Nijolė (2018a). "B rinktinė". vle.lt (in Lithuanian).
- Gaškaitė-Žemaitienė, Nijolė (2018b). "Aukuro rinktinė". vle.lt (in Lithuanian).
- Gaškaitė-Žemaitienė, Nijolė (2018c). "Butigeidžio rinktinė". vle.lt (in Lithuanian).
