= Nachman Dushanski =

Lithuanian Soviet intelligence officer

- Nachmanas Dušanskis
- Born: December 29, 1919; Šiauliai, Lithuania
- Died: February 20, 2008 (aged 88); Haifa, Israel
- Education: Vilnius University (1964)
- Military career
- Allegiance: Soviet Union
- Branch: NKVD, NKGB, MGB, KGB
- Service years: 1941–1971
- Rank: Lieutenant colonel
- Awards: Medal for Courage; Order of the Patriotic War; Order of Lenin

Nachman Dushanski (Lithuanian: Nachmanas Dušanskis, Russian: Нахман Ноахович Душанский, Hebrew: נחמן דושנסקי; December 29, 1919 – February 20, 2008) was a Lithuanian-born Jewish officer of Soviet security agencies.

His parents and three of his four siblings were killed in The Holocaust. For over thirty years, he was involved in the suppression of the anti-Soviet Lithuanian partisans.

In Russia, he was regarded as a war hero and was awarded the Medal for Courage, Order of the Patriotic War, and Order of Lenin, while many Lithuanians perceived him as a war criminal for the killing and torture of Viktoras Vitkauskas, Juozas Lukša, and other partisans.

In 1989, Dushanski immigrated to Israel. After Lithuania declared independence in 1990, Lithuanian prosecutors began a case for 9 criminal activities, but Israel refused to extradite him on the grounds that the case was motivated by anti-Semitism. Dushanski died a free man in 2008.

== Early life ==
He was born in to a large Jewish family with a long military background. Dushanski's father was blinded during World War I and could not provide for the large family. Therefore, after graduating from the 6th grade, Dushanski began working. This early exposure to manual labor pushed him into communism–socialism and, in 1934, he joined the illegal Lithuanian branch of the Komsomol (Communist Union of Youth) and helped distributing underground communist publications. For such communist activities he was arrested in June 1936. First, he was jailed in a juvenile prison; later he was transferred to prisons in Šiauliai and Raseiniai. While in prison, Dushanski joined the Lithuanian Communist Party in 1938.

== Soviet security officer ==
=== World War II ===
He was released when Soviet Union occupied Lithuania in June 1940 and was given a job as an assistant security officer at the NKVD office in Telšiai. His duties included securing the Soviet Union – Nazi Germany border. He was involved in mass arrests of the "enemies of the people" and the June deportation. Conflicting witnesses testimony implicated Dushanski in the Rainiai massacre, one of the many NKVD prisoner massacres at the beginning of the German invasion of the Soviet Union.

According to Dushanski, at the time he was returning from a vacation in Crimea and was attempting to evacuate his family from Šiauliai into Russia. However, the train did not leave the station and his parents and three siblings perished during the Holocaust; only his brother Jacob survived.

Dushanski evacuated through Pskov to Leningrad. He was stationed in Moscow during the Battle of Moscow and was put on firewood duty. Between spring 1942 and summer 1943, he attended intensive NKVD training courses on identification of spies, recruitment, interrogation, and other areas in preparation for work behind the German lines. He became a junior lieutenant of the KGB in January 1943, captain by 1945, and lieutenant colonel in 1956. He was deployed in the Smolensk area to capture German officers and other collaborators. Dushanski and other agents would dress in German uniforms, cross the front line, and arrest German officers.

=== Post-war ===
After the Minsk Offensive, Dushanski returned to Lithuania where he was assigned to the duties of the suppression of the Lithuanian partisans, the armed anti-Soviet guerrilla fighters. He was involved in the liquidation of the commands of the Tauras, Dainava, and Prisikėlimas districts, the killing of Juozas Vitkus and Juozas Lukša, and arrest and torture of Adolfas Ramanauskas. According to Dushanski, he was also involved in the apprehension of former Nazi collaborators, Holocaust perpetrators, and members of the Lithuanian Auxiliary Police Battalions (Schutzmannschaft).

In 1964, Dushanski graduated from the Law Faculty of Vilnius University. He retired from the Soviet security agencies in 1971 and worked as a jurist at a chemical factory and engineer at a computing directorate. He immigrated to Israel in 1989, just before the collapse of the Soviet Union.

== Lithuanian investigation ==
In 1996, now-independent Lithuanian prosecutors opened a criminal case against Dushanski. He was investigated on nine counts of repressions against the Lithuanian partisans. However, Israel refused to cooperate and did not respond to Lithuanian requests to question Dushanski as a witness or to extradite him on the grounds that the case stemmed from anti-Semitism.

Israel argued that there were at least 20 KGB and NKVD officers who were involved in similar reprisal actions and who lived in Lithuania, but were not prosecuted. Therefore, Israel concluded that Dushanski was being singled out because he was Jewish. Lithuania replied that the list contained names of people who had already died or who were born in post-war years and were too young to participate in the anti-partisan operations.

== See also ==
- Salomon Morel
