= Adolfas Ramanauskas =

American-Lithuanian partisan leader (1918–1957)

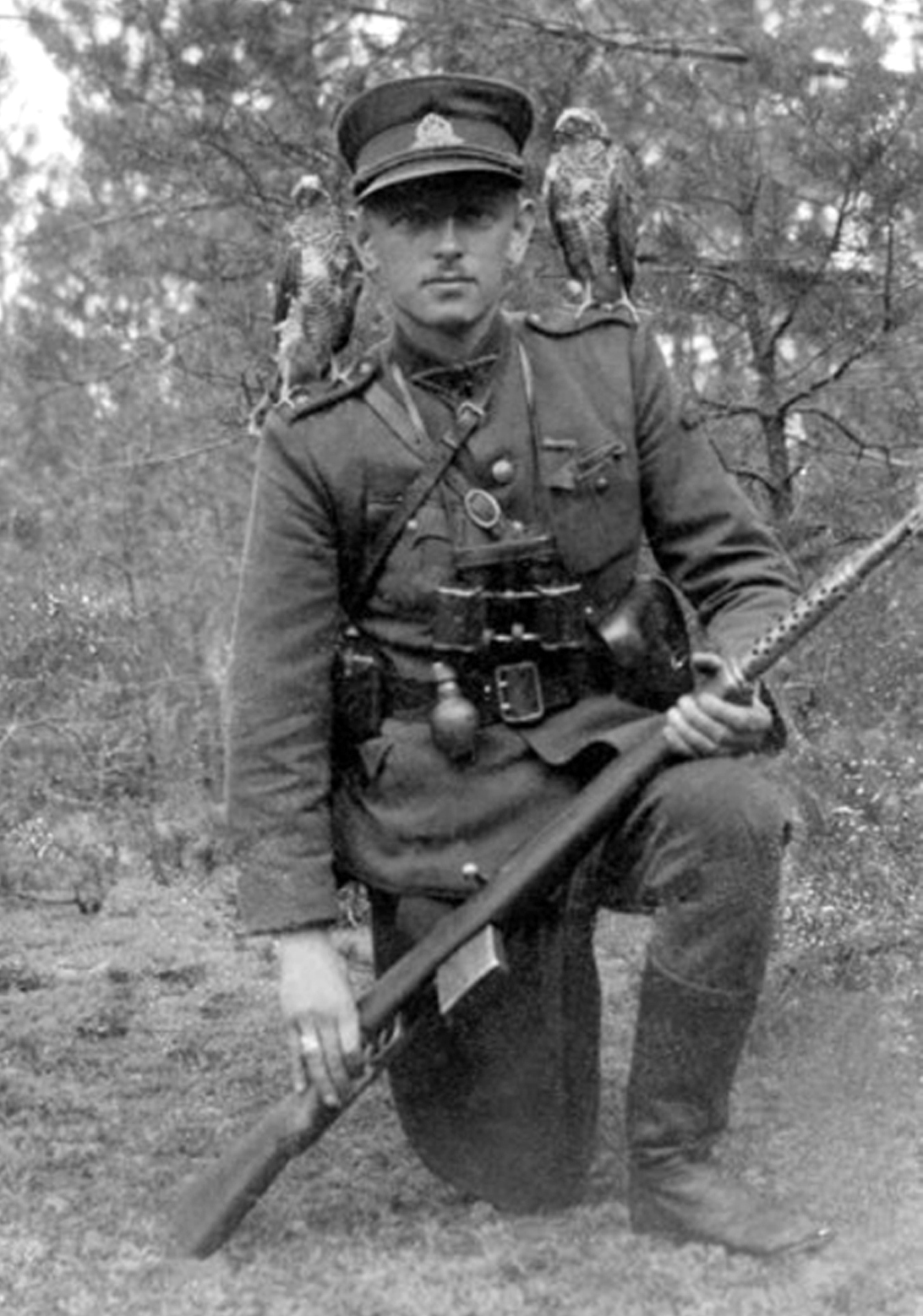
- Ramanauskas in 1947

Acting President of Lithuania (posthumous) (Note: Recognized as such posthumously on 20 November 2018.)
- Deputy Chairman of the Presidium of the Council of the Union of Lithuanian Freedom Fighters
- In office 26 November 1954 – 29 November 1957
- Preceded by: Jonas Žemaitis (as Chairman of the Union of Lithuanian Freedom Fighters)
- Succeeded by: Vytautas Landsbergis (first head of state of independent Lithuania in 1991)

Personal details
- Born: 3 March 1918 New Britain, Connecticut, United States
- Died: 29 November 1957 (aged 39) Vilnius, Lithuanian SSR, Soviet Union
- Cause of death: Execution by shooting
- Resting place: Antakalnis Cemetery
- Spouse: Birutė Mažeikaitė (m. 1945)
- Children: Daughter Auksutė
- Profession: Scout, teacher, journalist, partisan leader

Military service
- Allegiance: Lithuania
- Years of service: 1945–1956 (partisan service)
- Rank: Major (February 1949); Colonel (autumn 1949); Brigade General (26 January 1998; posthumously)
- Commands: Union of Lithuanian Freedom Fighters
- Awards: Grand Cross of the Order of the Cross of Vytis (1999)

Adolfas Ramanauskas (6 March 1918 – 29 November 1957), code name Vanagas (lit. 'The Hawk'), was one of the leaders of the Lithuanian partisans and the anti-Soviet resistance. In 2018, the Seimas of Lithuania posthumously recognized him as the Head of state of Lithuania.

Ramanauskas was born in the United States to a family of Lithuanian immigrants who returned to Lithuania when he was 3 years old. He worked as a teacher during the Soviet and German occupations of Lithuania in World War II. When Lithuania was re-occupied by the Soviet Union in 1944–45, he joined the anti-Soviet resistance after the NKVD pressured him to spy on his students. Eventually, Ramanauskas climbed the ranks from a platoon commander to the chairman of the Union of Lithuanian Freedom Fighters. Betrayed by a classmate in 1956, he was arrested, brutally tortured, and eventually executed. He was the last known partisan commander to be captured.

The erection of Ramanauskas' memorial in Chicago on May 4, 2019 was protested as "offensive" by Russia, the Simon Wiesenthal Center, the World Jewish Congress, and the Jewish Agency, which made allegations that he collaborated with the Nazis during the Holocaust. This was denied by the Lithuanian government, which summoned the Russian ambassador over these claims, while the Lithuanian Jewish Community stated that there was nothing offensive about the memorial to Ramanauskas "as there are no historical materials testifying to controversial facts, such as complicity in the Holocaust".

== Early life ==
Ramanauskas was born to a Lithuanian immigrant family in New Britain, Connecticut, United States. In 1921, his family returned to Lithuania, bought 6 hectares (15 acres) of land in Bielėnai near Rudamina, and took up farming. Ramanauskas graduated from Galiniai primary school in 1930, and from Lazdijai Gymnasium in 1937. Being a scout, he continued his studies at the Klaipėda Pedagogical Institute. Just before his graduation the Klaipėda Region was ceded to Nazi Germany due to the 1939 German ultimatum to Lithuania, in fear of full scale German invasion, and the institute was consequently evacuated to Panevėžys.

== World War II ==
In 1939, Ramanauskas enrolled into the War School of Kaunas. He graduated with the rank of second lieutenant in the reserve forces. His class of 1940 was the last graduating class before the Soviet Union occupied Lithuania in June 1940. After graduation, Ramanauskas moved to Krivonys near Druskininkai where he became a teacher. He participated in the anti-Soviet June Uprising in Lithuania at the start of the German invasion of the Soviet Union in June 1941.

Efraim Zuroff, chief of the Simon Wiesenthal Center, said that Ramanauskas admitted to commanding a partisan unit during the uprising that witnesses said butchered Jews in the ghetto of Druskininkai, 75 miles southwest of Vilnius. He added that, although there is no proof that Ramanauskas himself directly murdered anyone, "it is the Center's position that his leadership during this period of persecution should automatically disqualify him from being declared a national hero." The Lithuanian government replied that Ramanauskas' unit did not engage in any actions against Jews and were actually focused on protecting private property during the time of the uprising. In addition, the Lithuanian Ministry of Foreign Affairs and state-funded Genocide and Resistance Research Centre maintain that the allegations of collaboration with Nazis are "lies [...] spread first by the Soviet-era KGB secret police to discredit him." Historian and politician Arvydas Anušauskas has similarly claimed that the allegations have their origins in a "Russian backed anti-Lithuanian disinformation campaign" led by the KGB officer and his torturer Nachman Dushanski. Ramanauskas himself, already in 1952, wrote in his diary that:

Soviet occupants called us "German Nationalists". They used this term in order to discredit us inside the country and abroad - hoping that perhaps some people will believe that we were fighting for Nazi affairs, at the same time betraying our homeland".

During the German occupation of Lithuania, Ramanauskas lived in Alytus and taught mathematics, the Lithuanian language, and physical education at the Alytus Teachers' Seminary. The Red Army's eventual victory over the Wehrmacht led to the re-occupation of Lithuania and the mass deportations, killings and other repressions that came with it.

== Guerrilla warfare (1945–1952) ==
=== 1945 ===
In early 1945, Ramanauskas joined the Lithuanian partisans who waged a guerrilla war against the Soviet occupants. He adopted the nom-de-guerre Vanagas ("Hawk") and joined partisan formations in southern Lithuania (Suvalkija and Dzūkija), which were most active among Lithuanian partisans.

Ramanauskas joined a partisan platoon operating in the environs of Nemunaitis and Alovė and was immediately elected its commander. He organised disorganised resistance members into a 140-men Merkinė company (later reorganized into a battalion). The early stages of resistance saw open battles with the NKVD and destruction battalions. Two of such encounters were in the Varčios Forest between Alovė and Daugai on 14 and 23 June 1945. During the shootout, 30–47 partisans were killed and 6–14 taken prisoners. On 1 July 1945, Ramanauskas was promoted to commander of Merkys Brigade (composed of three battalions – Merkinė, Marcinkonys and Druskininkai).

In October 1945, in Nedzingė he married Birutė Mažeikaitė, a former student at the Alytus Teachers' Seminary and fellow partisan fighter (codename Vanda). On 15 December 1945, he led a daring but unsuccessful attack on Merkinė. The partisans destroyed Soviet records, but they could not free prisoners or overpower the Soviet troops in the local church. Ramanauskas strove to improve organisation and centralised command of the partisans.

=== 1946–1948 ===
He became commander of the Dainava military district after the death of Dominykas Jėčys-Ąžuolas in September 1947 and of the Southern Lithuania Region in 1948. He also wrote, edited, and published numerous partisan newspapers, including Mylėk Tėvynę (tr. Love Your Fatherland, 1946–47), Laisvės varpas (tr. The Bell of Freedom, 1947–49), Свободное слово (The Free Word, 1947–49), a Russian-language newspaper for Soviet soldiers, and Miško brolis (The Forest Brother, 1951–52).

=== 1949–1952 ===
In February 1949, he participated in a meeting of all partisan commanders in the village of Minaičiai. The Union of Lithuanian Freedom Fighters, chief command of the partisans, was established during the meeting. Ramanauskas was elected to the presidium of the Union and as the first deputy of its chairman Jonas Žemaitis. He was also promoted to the rank of major. Ramanauskas was one of the signatories of the Lithuanian Partisans Declaration of February 16, 1949, which proclaimed Lithuania as a democratic republic and the Lithuanian nation as a sovereign power.

In autumn 1949, Ramanauskas was further promoted to colonel and chief commander of the defensive forces of the Union of Lithuanian Freedom Fighters. When Žemaitis resigned due to poor health in 1952, Ramanauskas became the leader of the Union. However, by that time the armed resistance had diminished. Due to heavy losses organised structures broke down and partisans continued their struggles individually. Ramanauskas officially ordered cessation of armed struggle in favour of passive resistance.

== Hiding (1953–1956) ==
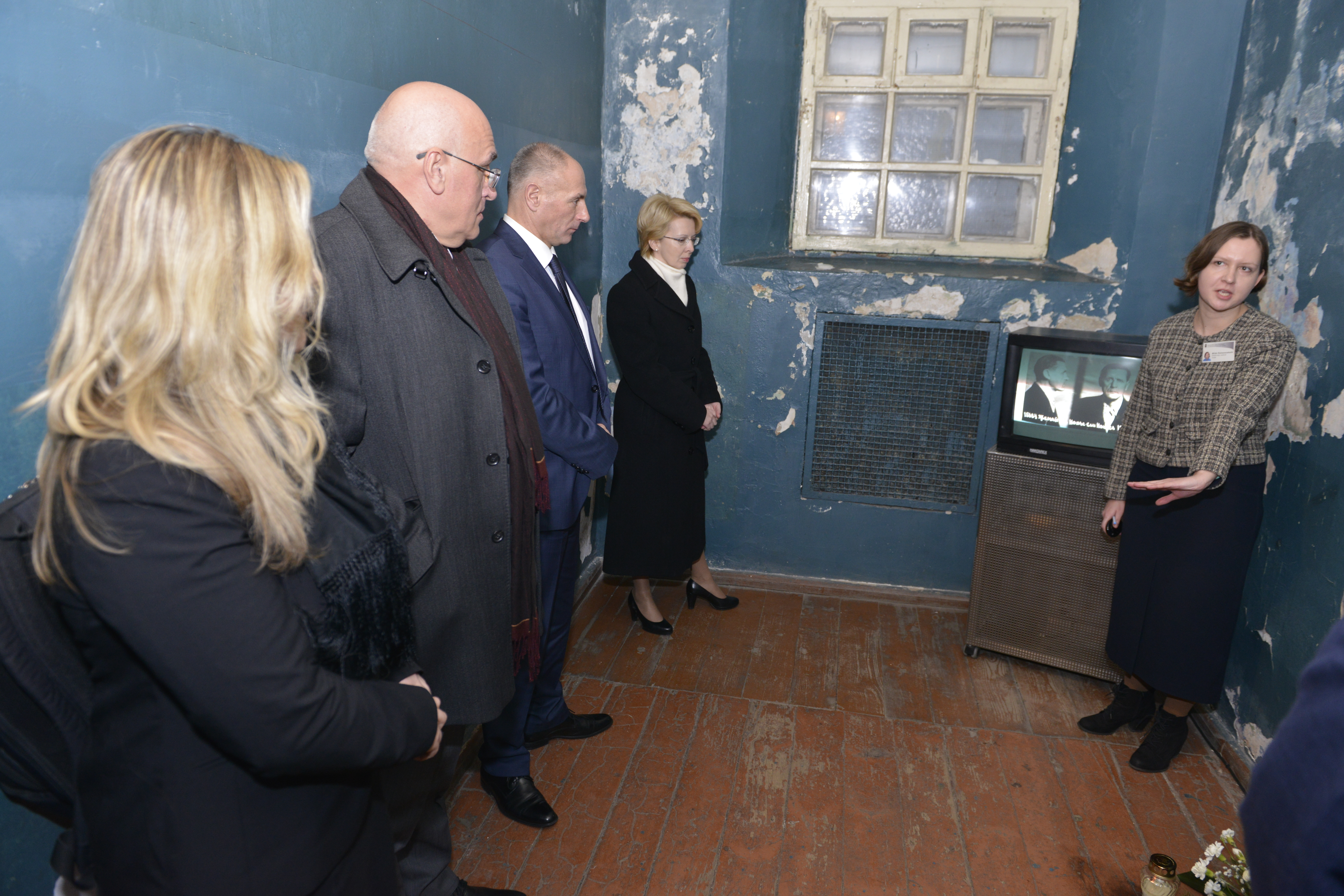
Chamber where Ramanauskas was previously held in the former KGB building in Vilnius

He obtained fake documents and lived in hiding. While in hiding he wrote three-part memoirs, which were hidden by trusted people and uncovered only in 1988–89 during the era of glasnost and first published as Daugel krito sūnų... (Many Sons Have Fallen...) in 1991.

The KGB formed a permanent operational group led by Petras Raslanas and Nachman Dushanski to capture Ramanauskas, which, according to Auksutė Ramanauskaitė-Skokauskienė, had as many as thirty agents in 1956. Ramanauskas was betrayed by Antanas Urbonas, a former classmate at Kaunas, and arrested on 11 October 1956.

== Capture, torture and death (1956–1957) ==
He was taken to the KGB prison in Vilnius (now the Museum of Genocide Victims) and tortured. On 12 October barely alive, he was transferred to a hospital, where doctors noted his many wounds – his eye was punctured 5 times, he was missing genitals, had a bruised stomach, etc. He was cut alive and then stitched. Scissors were actively used during his torture. This took place despite Nikita Khrushchev having officially claimed to have abolished torture. Sentenced to death on 25 September 1957, Vanagas was executed on 29 November 1957.

His wife Birutė Mažeikaitė was sentenced to 8 years in the Gulag system.

== Awards ==
=== Antemortem ===
On 9 April 1946, Ramanauskas-Vanagas was awarded the Zeal Stripe (Uolumo juostelė) for conducting organizational work for the resistance movement and the Bravery Stripe (juostelė "Už narsumą") for heading the attack on Soviet occupiers in Merkinė. In 1949–1950, he received the Freedom Fight Cross with Swords (1st and 2nd class).

=== Postmortem ===
On 27 December 1997, Ramanauskas-Vanagas, was granted the status of a "military volunteer," and on 26 January 1998, he was posthumously granted the rank of reserve brigadier general by decree of the President of Lithuania, in addition to being awarded the Order of the Cross of Vytis (second class) and in 1999 the Order of the Cross of Vytis (first class). In 2018, Seimas passed a resolution identifying Ramanauskas as the "highest-ranking Lithuanian official in the fight against Soviet occupation" from 1954 to 1957.

== Commemoration ==
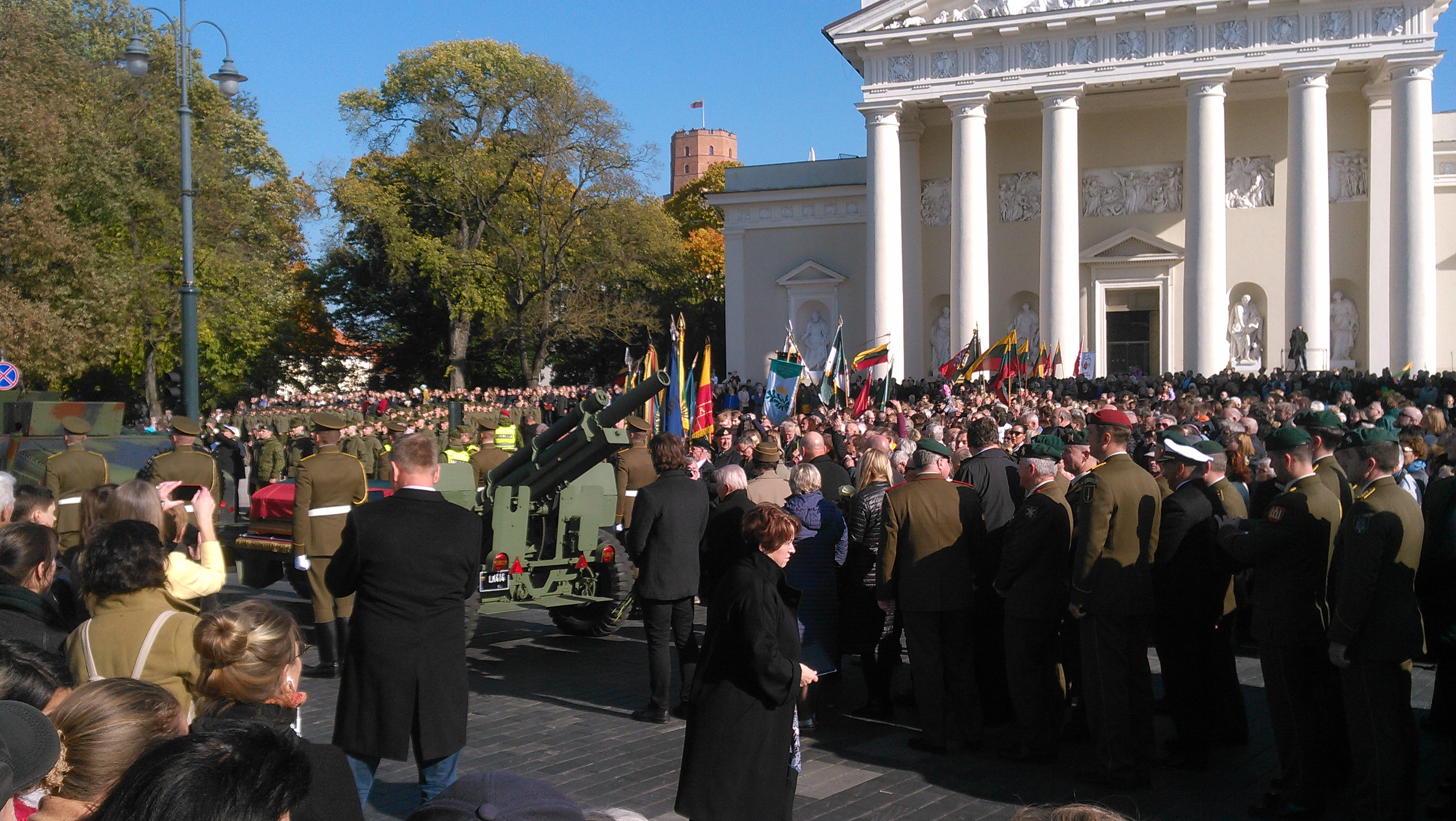
State funeral of the Lithuanian partisan commander Adolfas Ramanauskas-Vanagas, 2018

A book of memoirs by Ramanauskas, written between 1952 and 1956 and assembled by his daughter Auksutė Ramanauskaitė-Skokauskienė, was published in 1991 under the title Daugel krito sūnų ("Many sons fell"). In 2018, the Lithuanian Genocide and Resistance Research Centre published an English translation of the work, entitled Many Sons Have Fallen in the Partisan Ranks. Auksutė was also elected to the Seimas in 2008.

In December 2017, Israeli ambassador Amir Maimon visited Ramanauskas's daughter and reportedly "expressed indirect diplomatic support to the memory of the freedom fighter."

=== Monument in the U.S. ===
In 2017, plans to erect a monument for the 100th anniversary of Ramanauskas's birth in his native New Britain, Connecticut were cancelled following the adoption of a council petition.

On May 4, 2019, a monument to Ramanauskas was unveiled in Chicago, which was criticized by Russia, the Simon Wiesenthal Center, the World Jewish Congress, and the Jewish Agency, which made allegations that he collaborated with the Nazis during the Holocaust. The Lithuanian Jewish Community, however, issued a statement that "at the present time [they have] no reliable information implicating Lithuanian partisan leader Adolfas Ramanauskas in Holocaust crimes."

=== Other monuments ===
In 2022, a monument for Ramanauskas was unveiled in Merkinė. The monument was soon vandalised, twice – in 2023 and 2024. Three individuals associated with the second incident were arrested in Estonia – two Estonian-Russian citizens and one Russian citizen – and prosecuted in Lithuania, following their extradition. In July 2025, Lithuanian prosecutors concluded that they acted on behalf of the Russian GRU.

=== Grave ===
In 2018, Ramanauskas's grave was found at the Našlaičiai (lit. Orphans) Cemetery in Antakalnis, Vilnius. The identity was confirmed by anthropological analysis of the skull, DNA investigation, and photographic matching. His death was the result of a gunshot in the vertex of his head. His remains were discovered and reburied in a state funeral among other state leaders in the Antakalnis Cemetery, at which Lithuanian President Dalia Grybauskaitė spoke, diplomats from 30 countries and thousands of ordinary people participated. The Seimas designated 2018 the year of Ramanauskas-Vanagas.
