= Misiūnas =

Misiūnas is a Lithuanian surname. Notable people with the surname include:

- Dalius Misiūnas (born 1978), Lithuanian manager and university rector
- Eimutis Misiūnas (1911–1947), Lithuanian commander
- Jonas Misiūnas (born 1973), Lithuanian jurist and politician
