= Juozas Vitkus =

Lithuanian anti-soviet partisan commander (1901–1946)

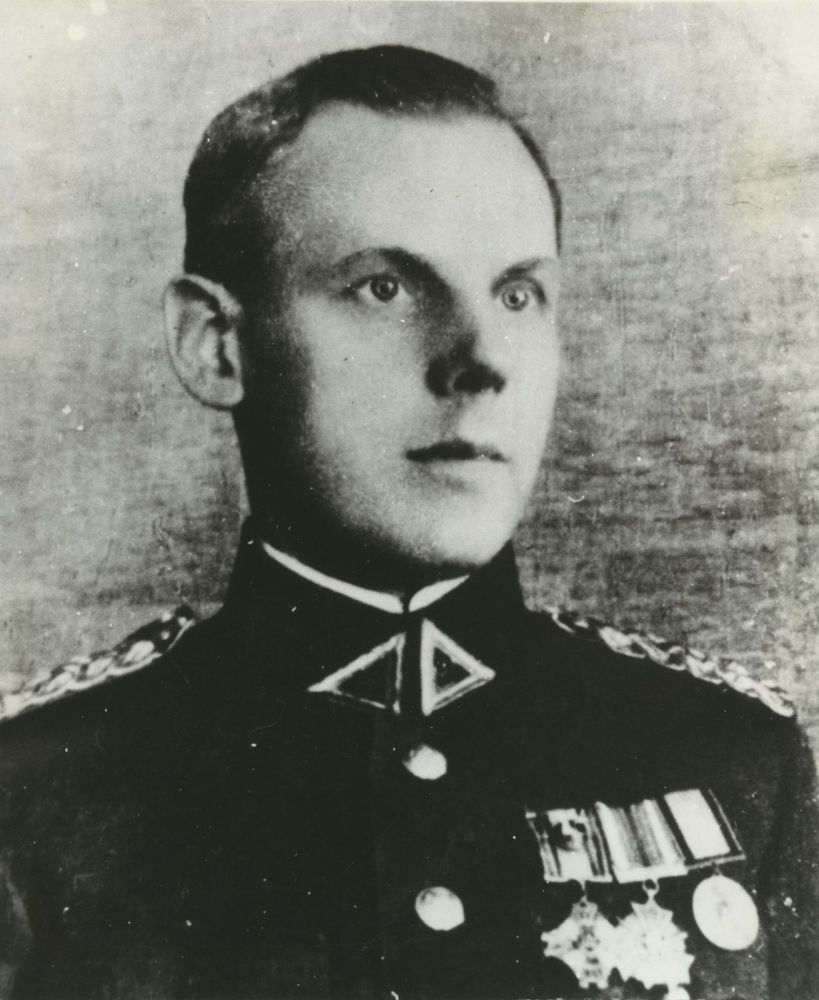
- Portrait of Juozas Vitkus-Kazimieraitis

Personal details
- Born: 10 December 1901 Ketūnai, Kovno Governorate, Russian Empire
- Died: 2 July 1946 (aged 44) Žaliamiškis, Lazdijai County, Lithuanian SSR
- Spouse: Genovaitė Grybauskaitė
- Children: 7
- Education: War School of Kaunas, Royal Military Academy
- Occupation: Lithuanian partisan, officer, teacher
- Known for: Leader of partisans in southern Lithuania

Military service
- Allegiance: Lithuania
- Years of service: 1920–1940 (Lithuanian Army); 1940–1941 (Red Army); 1942–1946 (Lithuanian partisans)

Juozas Vitkus, also known by his partisan codename Kazimieraitis (10 December 1901 – 2 July 1946) was an anti-Soviet Lithuanian partisan commander.

He was an officer in the interwar Lithuanian army and a lector in the War School of Kaunas. After the Soviet occupation of Lithuania, he was head of the apartments and property department in Vilnius. From 1942 he was involved in the Lithuanian Front, an underground anti-Nazi resistance movement. In 1945 he got involved with the anti-Soviet partisan movement and joined the partisans in the Varėna District of southern Lithuania, where he was appointed its commander. He died fighting in an ambush in 1946.

== Biography ==
=== Early life ===
Juozas Vitkus was born on 10 December 1901 in the Ketūnai village of the Mažeikiai District to peasants Juozapas Vitkus and Marijona Plonytė. According to Vytautas Vitkus, his future son, and the memoirs published about his father, Vitkus's grandfather Mykolas Vitkus was a book smuggler. His son and the father of Juozas Vitkus, Juozapas Vitkus, secretly emigrated to the United States in 1903 or 1904 to earn money. He later called upon the family to emigrate as well, in order to avoid the consequences of the Russo-Japanese War, but in 1906 the family got stuck in London. The family, not being to read or write English, and also due to their mother's illness which prohibited her from immigration, were put into financial hardship. Consequently, the sons were put in an orphanage, while the mother worked a minimum wage job. The father then emigrated to London to find his family, succeeding only after some bureaucratic trouble. They then moved back to Lithuania, to Tirkšliai.

=== Education and interwar Lithuania ===
Juozas Vitkus completed primary education in Tirkšliai, where he also learned to play the violin. In 1913 he studied at the Mažeikiai trade school, where he learned French and German, as well as at the Telšiai high school, from which he graduated in 1922. At the end of 1918, he started working as a clerk and secretary of Tirkšliai municipality. In 1920, he joined the Kaunas war school and participated in the Lithuanian Wars of Independence. From 1924 to 1926 he studied higher military technical courses in Kaunas. He married Genovaitė Grybauskaitė in 1927, with whom he had 7 children. From 1929 to 1934 he studied military engineering at the Royal Military Academy in Brussels. By performance he placed second, while first place was taken by Prince Albert of Belgium. In 1938 he was awarded the rank of lieutenant colonel and began teaching engineering in the Kaunas war school. Vitkus actively participated and collaborated in publications like Kardas, Karys, and Mūsų žinynas.

=== Life in the LAF and the partisan movement ===
In 1941, Vitkus was a staff member of the Lithuanian Activist Front in Vilnius, which organized an uprising on June 22, 1941. To avoid being taken into the Nazi army, his close friend organized for him to work in the department of apartments and property. Due to his prominence as an officer and underground staff member and teacher, he was later increasingly unsuccessfully persecuted by Soviet agents. To avoid full capture, he moved to Dzūkija and got a job as an accountant in the Kabeliai forestry. In May 1945, he founded the Dzūkija partisan headquarters and formed the Merkis partisan group, which was renamed to the Kazimieriatis group after his death. He founded the "partisan district A", and in the spring of 1946, together with the Tauras partisan district, he formed the southern Lithuanian partisan district and was elected its commander. Vitkus also prepared a partisan statute, as well as signed a decree announcing the main principles of the restoration of Lithuania and its independence. During this time he published the newspaper Laisvės varpas (bell of freedom). He modeled the partisans in the form of the Lithuanian army, enforcing strict discipline as well as the use of codenames, uniforms, as well as creating a mobilization plan. In 1946 he was heavily wounded in fights against the Soviet Army in a forest in the Lazdijai District. He was later taken into custody but died while being driven to headquarters in Leipalingis. The death of Juozas Vitkus-Kazimieraitis was reported to Stalin himself. His body was not discovered until 2022 in the yard of former MGB headquarters in Druskininkai.

== Remembrance ==
The Presidium of the Union of Lithuanian Freedom Fighters in 1949 awarded Vitkus the title of freedom fighter-warrior, and was awarded the Cross of Freedom Fighters, 1st degree. In independent Lithuania in 1997, via the president's decree, Vitkus was also awarded the Order of the Cross of Vytis, 1st degree. In 1998 he was awarded the rank of colonel. An engineering battalion in Kaunas, as well as some streets in Vilnius and Kaunas are named after him. Multiple memorials were built in his home village, his death place, as well as in Vilnius, Marijampolė, Kaunas (near the war school and engineers' headquarters), and Varėna District. The middle school in Tirkšliai is named after him. A documentary dedicated to Vitkus called Nepaprasta auka was directed by Agnė Zalanskaitė in 2017. A second documentary entitled Bučiuoju, Juozas was made in 2023. Vitkus's son has created a series of memoirs about his father entitled Pulkininkas Kazimieraitis.

== See also ==
- Anti-Soviet partisans
- Forest Brothers
