= Red Terror on the Amber Coast =

- Directed by: Ken Gumbert
- Written by: David O’Rourke, Ken Gumbert
- Produced by: David O’Rourke
- Release date: 2008
- Running time: 60 minutes
- Country: United States
- Language: English

Red Terror on the Amber Coast is an American documentary film about the Lithuanian resistance to the Soviet occupation from the signing of the Molotov–Ribbentrop Pact in 1939 to the dissolution of the Soviet Union in 1991.

Two Dominican Order priests, David O'Rourke and Ken Gumbert, collaborated on the project with the intent to have it reach millions of American viewers through public broadcasting.

During a year teaching at Vilnius University, O'Rourke was inspired by an accidental visit to the former KGB headquarters in Vilnius, calling it "one of the most chilling experiences of my life." He teamed up with Gumbert, who had been making a documentary about the Czechoslovak coup d'état of 1948. They gained access to Lithuania's film and photo archives. It took several years of work in the archives before they gained the confidence of those featured in interviews - including former prisoners and Forest Brothers. Lithuanian president (at the time of filming) Valdas Adamkus appears in the film.

Red Terror was released in fall 2008. It was televised for the first time in January on Rhode Island PBS station WSBE-TV, Channel 36. It has subsequently been uploaded by NETA, the National Educational Telecommunications Association, for distribution to participating PBS stations, and is shown around the United States

== Recognition ==
The film received special screenings, including at The Heritage Foundation in December 2008, where it was introduced by Audrius Bruzga, Lithuania's ambassador to the US, followed by a discussion with Gumbert and O'Rourke, and at the Rhode Island International Film Festival in the summer of 2009. On 23 August 2010, the anniversary of the signing of the Molotov-Ribbentrop Pact of 1939, Lithuanian National Television broadcast Red Terror in prime time throughout the country in commemoration of the event and its impact.
