= Galiniai =

- Village
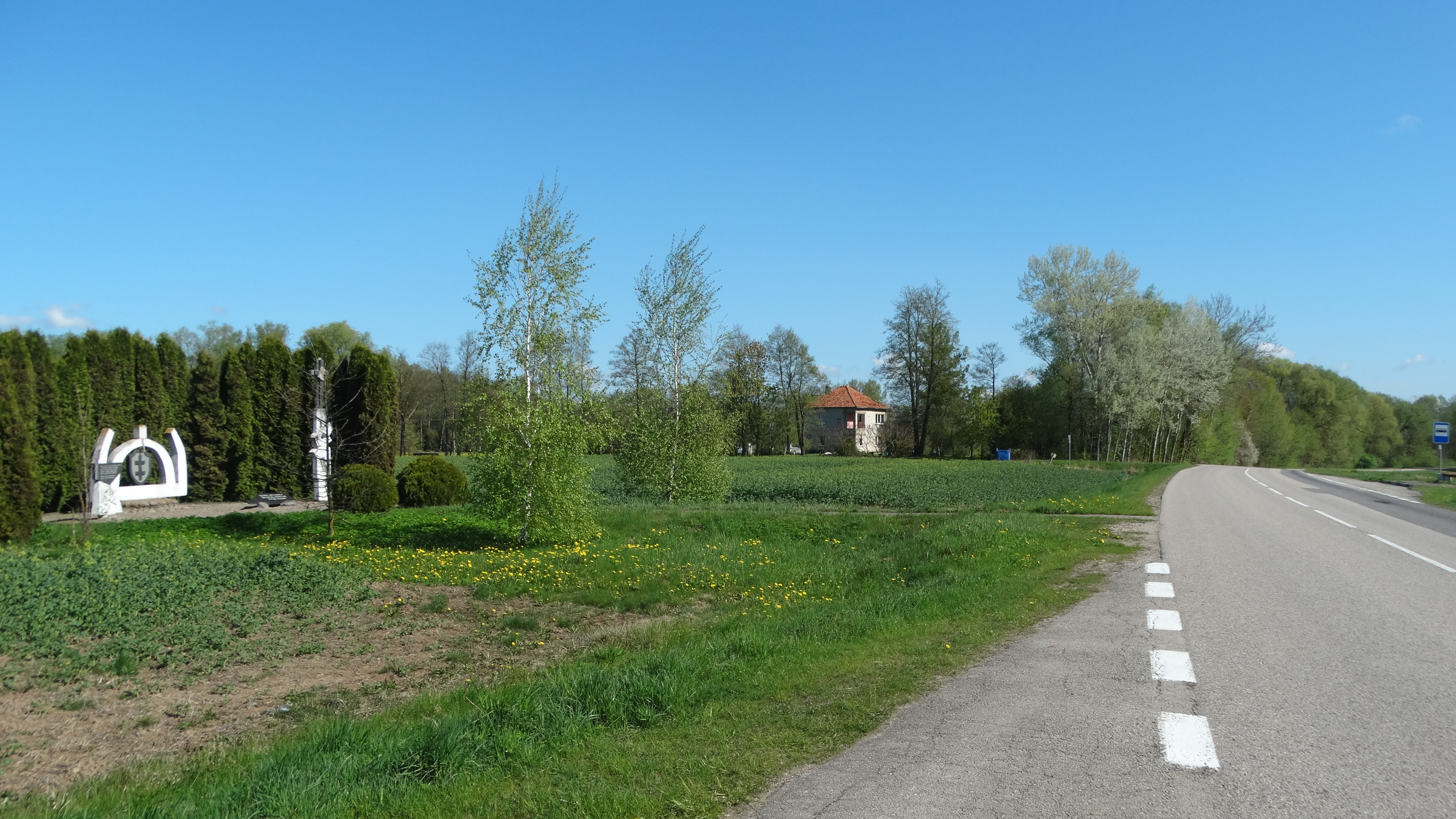

- Location of Galiniai
- Coordinates: 54°13′41″N 23°23′20″E
- Country: Lithuania
- Ethnographic region: Suvalkija
- County: Marijampolė County
- Municipality: Šakiai district municipality
- Eldership: Griškabūdis eldership

Population (2011)
  - Total: 9
- Time zone: UTC+2 (EET)
  - Summer (DST): UTC+3 (EEST)

Galiniai is a village in the region of Suvalkija, Lithuania, near the border with Poland.

It has the exact geographical coordinates, latitude and longitude — 55.30047399999999, 25.3862789, and is located in the Eastern European Standard Time zone.

Its official currency is the Euro.
