= Minaičiai =

- Village
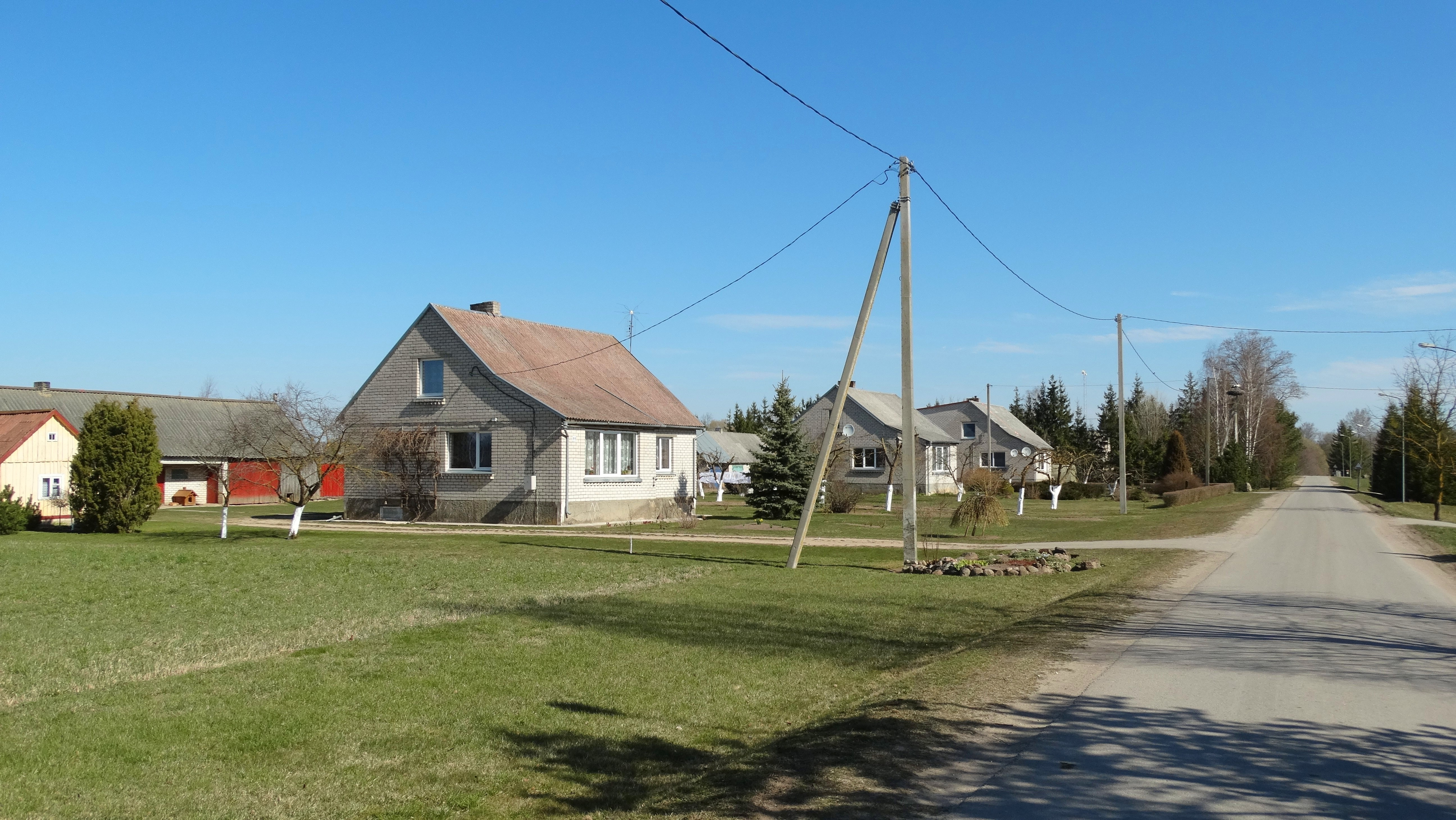
- One of the streets in Minaičiai

- Location of Minaičiai
- Coordinates: 55°37′52″N 23°33′11″E
- Country: Lithuania
- County: Šiauliai County
- Municipality: Radviliškis district municipality
- Eldership: Ginkiškis eldership

Population (2011)
  - Total: 179
- Time zone: UTC+2 (EET)
  - Summer (DST): UTC+3 (EEST)

Minaičiai or Mėnaičiai is a village in Lithuania, located on the Šušvė River. It has a primary school. According to the 2011 census, it had 179 residents. Minaičiai has a amateur football club called Minaičiai FK

== History ==
After World War II, the homestead of Stanislovas Miknius hid a bunker of Leonardas Grigonis (codename Užpalis), commander of the Lithuanian partisans of the Resurrection District (Prisikėlimo apygarda). In February 1949, the village was a meeting place of the commanders of the Lithuanian partisans, who established the Union of Lithuanian Freedom Fighters. In spring 1949, the partisans left the village and the bunker was destroyed by Miknius. In 2004, during a construction work, Miknius family found a hidden milk can with more than 2000 pages of various partisan documents. In November 2010, the partisan bunker was reconstructed; it displays a small exhibit of partisan documents and other items. The opening ceremony was attended by President of Lithuania Dalia Grybauskaitė.
