= Algimantas military district =

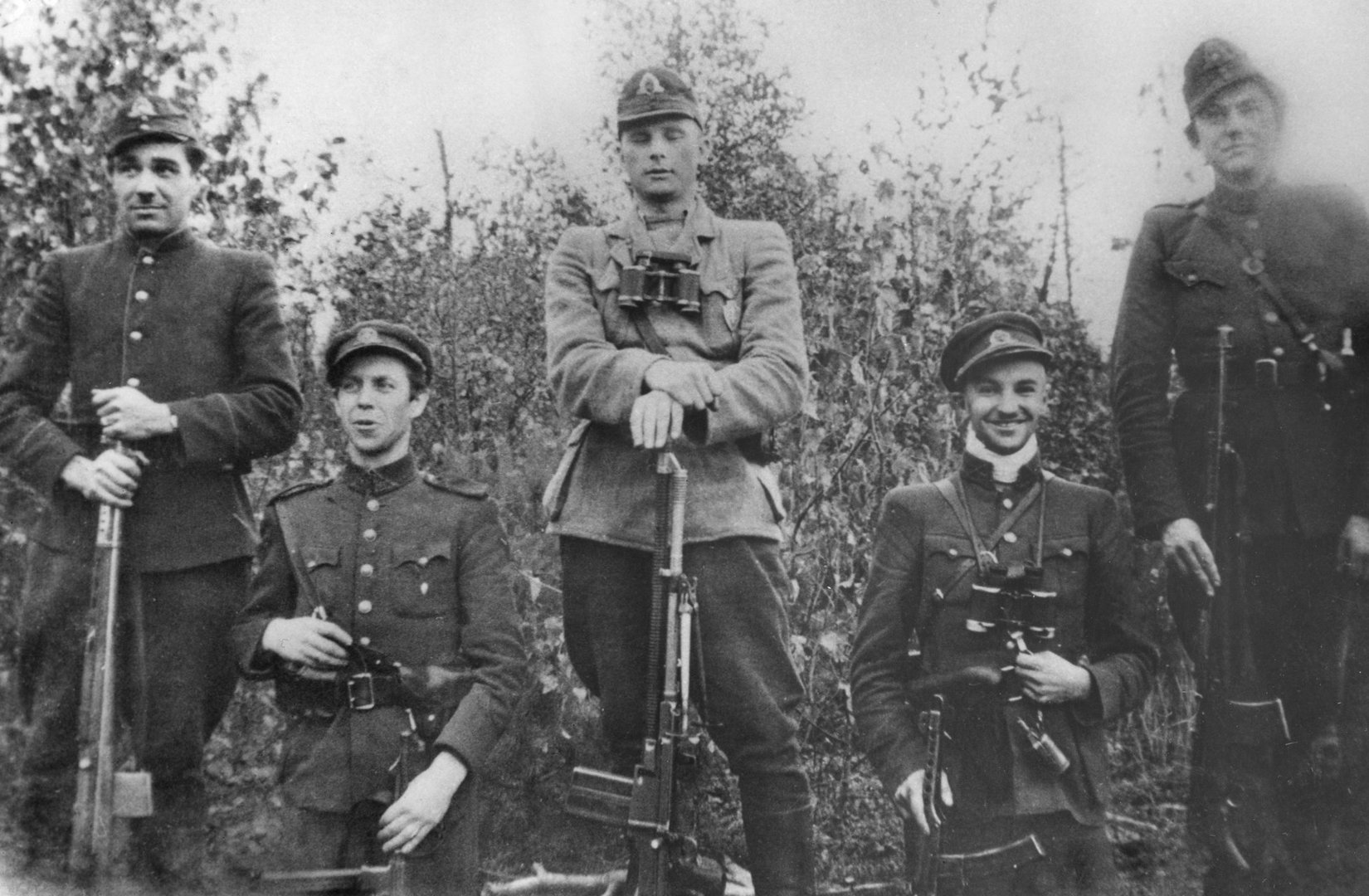
Lithuanian partisans of the Algimantas military district, forming the Columns of Gediminas using weapons in 1949

Algimantas military district (also Algimantas partisan military district) is a military district of Lithuanian partisans which operated in 1947-1950 in the counties of Panevėžys and Rokiškis. The military district consisted of the territorial units - detachments (rinktinė) - Šarūnas, Kunigaikštis Margiris (Duke Margiris), Žalioji (Green).

== Leaders ==
Name and surname	Nom de guerre	Since	Till	Comments
Antanas Slučka	Šarūnas	1944 May	1947 April	
Antanas Starkus	Blinda, Montė	1947 August	1949 November	died in the line of duty

== Structure of Lithuanian partisans' organisation ==
LLKS
Western Lithuania (Jūra) region	Southern Lithuania (Nemunas) region	Eastern Lithuania (King Mindaugas) region
Žemaičiai military district	Prisikėlimas military district	Kęstutis military district	Tauras military district	Dainava military district	Algimantas military district	Vytautas military district	Vytis military district	Didžioji Kova military district
Alka	Maironis	Vaidotas	Vytautas	Dzūkai	Žalioji	Tigras	Krikštaponis
Šatrija	Duke Žvelgaitis	Birutė	Žalgiris	Šarūnas	Šarūnas	Liūtas	Briedis
Kardas	Juozapavičius	Butageidis	Geležinis vilkas	Kazimieraitis	Duke Margiris	Lokys
Lietuvos žalioji
