= Didžioji Kova military district =

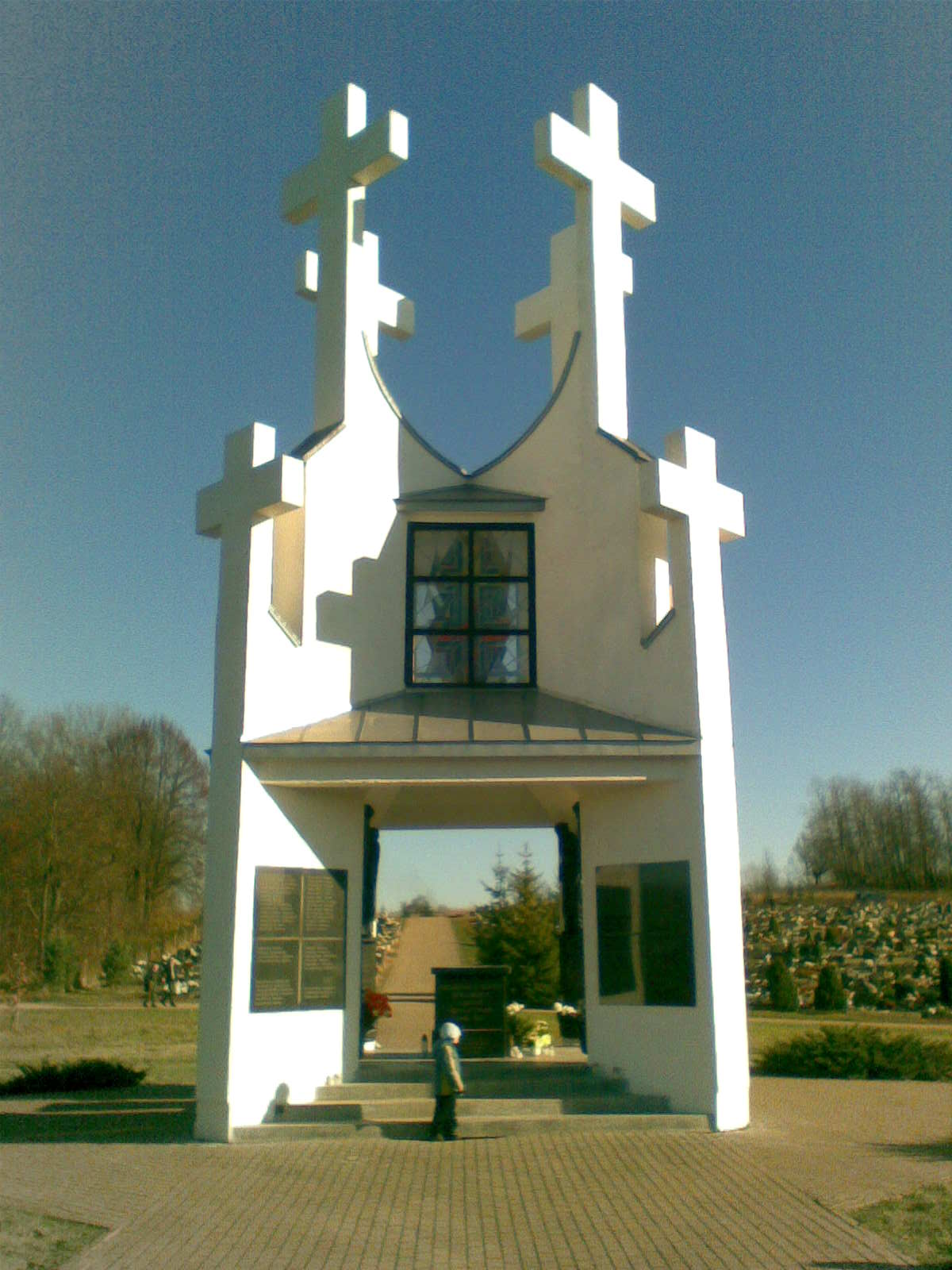
A monument to the partisans of The Great Fight military district in Kaišiadorys

Didžioji Kova military district (The Great Fight partisan military district) – is a military district of Lithuanian partisans which operated in 1945 – 1950 in the counties of Vilnius, Kaunas and Ukmergė.

== Leaders ==
Name and surname	Nom de guerre	Since	Till
Jonas Misiūnas	Žaliasis Velnias	1944 September	1946 July
Mečislovas Kareckas	Serbentas	1948 August	1949 August
Vytautas Pečiūra	Griežtas	1946 July	1947 end of the year
Alfonsas Morkūnas	Plienas	1948 September	1949 December

== Structure of Lithuanian partisans' organisation ==
LLKS
Western Lithuania (Jūra) region	Southern Lithuania (Nemunas) region	Eastern Lithuania (King Mindaugas) region
Žemaičiai military district	Prisikėlimas military district	Kęstutis military district	Tauras military district	Dainava military district	Algimantas military district	Vytautas military district	Vytis military district	Didžioji Kova military district
Alka	Maironis	Vaidotas	Vytautas	Dzūkai	Žalioji	Tigras	Krikštaponis
Šatrija	Duke Žvelgaitis	Birutė	Žalgiris	Šarūnas	Šarūnas	Liūtas	Briedis
Kardas	Juozapavičius	Butageidis	Geležinis vilkas	Kazimieraitis	Duke Margiris	Lokys
Lietuvos žalioji

== See also ==
- Čiobiškis Manor
