= Lithuanian partisans =

Resistance against Soviet regime after World War II

Guerrilla war in Lithuania
- Part of the guerrilla war in the Baltic states and the Cold War
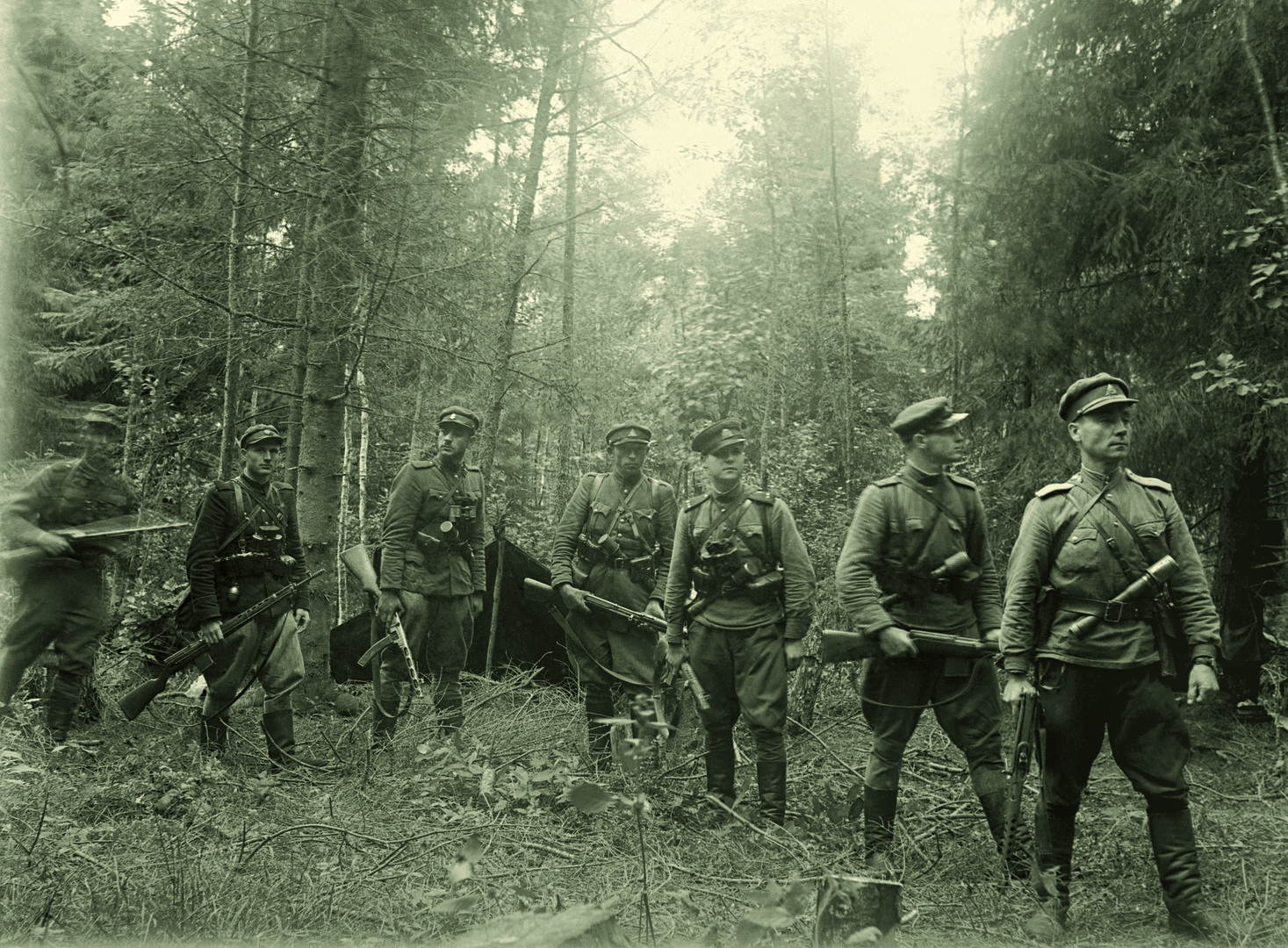
- Lithuanian partisans of the Vytautas military district Tigras (Tiger) team, 1947.
Date	1 July 1944 – May 1953
Location	Lithuania
Result	Soviet victory: Insurgency suppressed

Belligerents
Soviet Union: Lithuanian Soviet Socialist Republic	Lithuanian Forest Brothers

Commanders and leaders
Joseph Stalin; Lavrentiy Beria; Pavel Sudoplatov; Viktor Abakumov	Jonas Žemaitis-Vytautas (executed); Adolfas Ramanauskas-Vanagas (executed); Antanas Kraujelis-Siaubūnas †; Juozas Lukša-Daumantas †; Juozas Vitkus-Kazimieraitis †; Jonas Misiūnas-Žalias Velnias (executed); Justinas Lelešius-Grafas †; Lionginas Baliukevičius-Dzūkas †

Units involved
NKVD; NKGB; MGB; Destruction battalions	LLKS

Strength
200,000 NKVD personnel 2000–5000 "stribai" 1,500 NKGB personnel	50,000 partisans more than 100,000 support staff

Casualties and losses
12,921 killed	20,323 killed 20,000 captured
- 183,000 arrested residents; 142,000 were sent to the Gulags; 80,000 convicts received sentences for political crimes; 90,000 civilians killed, circa 200,000 deported (including partisan supporters)

Lithuanian partisans waged guerrilla warfare in Lithuania against the Soviet Union in 1944–1953. Similar anti-Soviet resistance groups, also known as Forest Brothers and cursed soldiers, fought against Soviet rule in Estonia, Latvia and Poland. An estimated total of 30,000 Lithuanian partisans and their supporters were killed. The Lithuanian partisan war lasted almost for a decade, thus becoming one of the longest partisan wars in Europe.

At the end of World War II, the Red Army pushed the Eastern Front towards Lithuania. The Soviets invaded and occupied Lithuania by the end of 1944. As forced conscription into Red Army and Stalinist repressions escalated, thousands of Lithuanians took to the forests in the countryside as a refuge. These spontaneous groups became more organized and centralized culminating in the establishment of the Union of Lithuanian Freedom Fighters in February 1948. In their documents, the partisans emphasized that their ultimate goal was the recreation of independent Lithuania. As the partisan war continued, it became clear that the West would not interfere in Eastern Europe (see Western betrayal) and the partisans had no chance of success against a far stronger opponent. Eventually, the partisans made an explicit and conscious decision not to accept any new members. The leadership of the partisans was destroyed in 1953 thus effectively ending the partisan war, though individual fighters held out until the 1960s.

== Background ==
Lithuania regained its independence in 1918 after the collapse of the Russian Empire. As pre-war tensions rose in Europe, Nazi Germany and the Soviet Union signed the Molotov–Ribbentrop Pact and divided Eastern Europe into spheres of influence. Subsequently, Lithuania was occupied by the Soviet Union in June 1940. The Soviets instituted Sovietization policies and repressions. In June 1941, the Soviets deported over 17,000 Lithuanians to Siberia, with most of the deportees dying in the harsh winters. When a few days later Germany launched an invasion of Russia, Lithuanians organized a popular anti-Soviet uprising. Initially, the Lithuanians greeted the Germans as liberators from the repressive Soviet rule and made plans to reestablish independent Lithuania. However, the attitudes soon changed as the occupation of Lithuania by Nazi Germany continued.

Unlike Estonia and Latvia where the Germans conscripted the local population into military formations in the Waffen-SS, Lithuania boycotted German recruitment calls and never had their own Waffen-SS division. In 1944, the Nazi authorities authorized the Lithuanian Territorial Defense Force (LTDF) under General Povilas Plechavičius to combat Soviet partisans led by Antanas Sniečkus and the Polish partisans of the Home Army. The LTDF soon reached a strength of 19,500 men. The Germans, however came to see the LTDF as a nationalist threat to their occupation regime and its senior staff were arrested on May 15, 1944. General Plechavičius was deported to the Salaspils concentration camp in Latvia. However, a large proportion of the LTDF succeeded in escaping deportation to Germany and formed guerrilla units, dissolved into the countryside in preparation for partisan operations against the Soviet Army as the Eastern Front approached.

On July 1, 1944, the Lithuanian Liberty Army (Lithuanian: Lietuvos laisvės armija, LLA) declared a state of war against the Soviet Union and ordered all able-bodied members to mobilize into platoons stationed in the forests and not to leave Lithuania. The departments were replaced by two sectors – operational, called Vanagai (Hawks or Falcons; abbreviated VS), and organizational (abbreviated OS). Vanagai, commanded by Albinas Karalius (codename Varenis), were the armed fighters while the organizational sector was tasked with passive resistance, including supply of food, information, and transport to Vanagai. In the middle of 1944, the LLA had 10 000 members. The Soviets had killed 659 and arrested 753 members of the LLA by January 26, 1945. Founder Kazys Veverskis was killed in December 1944, and its headquarters were liquidated in December 1945. This represented the failure of highly centralized resistance; the organization was depended too much on Veverskis and other top commanders. In 1946 the remaining leaders and fighters of the LLA started to merge with Lithuanian partisans. In 1949 all members of the presidium of the Union of Lithuanian Freedom Fighters – captain Jonas Žemaitis-Tylius, Petras Bartkus-Žadgaila, and Bronius Liesys-Naktis ir Juozas Šibaila-Merainis – came from the LLA.

The Supreme Committee for the Liberation of Lithuania (Lithuanian: Vyriausiasis Lietuvos išlaisvinimo komitetas, VLIK) was created on November 25, 1943. VLIK published underground newspapers and agitated for resistance against the Nazis. The Gestapo arrested most influential members in 1944. After the reoccupation of Lithuania by the Soviets, VLIK moved to the West and set as its goal to maintain the non-recognition of Lithuania's occupation and dissemination of information from behind the Iron Curtain – including the information provided by the Lithuanian partisans.

Former members of the Lithuanian Territorial Defense Force, the Lithuanian Liberty Army, Lithuanian Armed Forces and Lithuanian Riflemen's Union formed the basis of Lithuanian partisans. Farmers, Lithuanian officials, students, teachers, and even pupils joined the partisans. The movement was actively supported by Lithuanian society and the Catholic church. By the end of 1945, an estimated 30 000 armed people lived in the Lithuanian forests.

== Organization ==
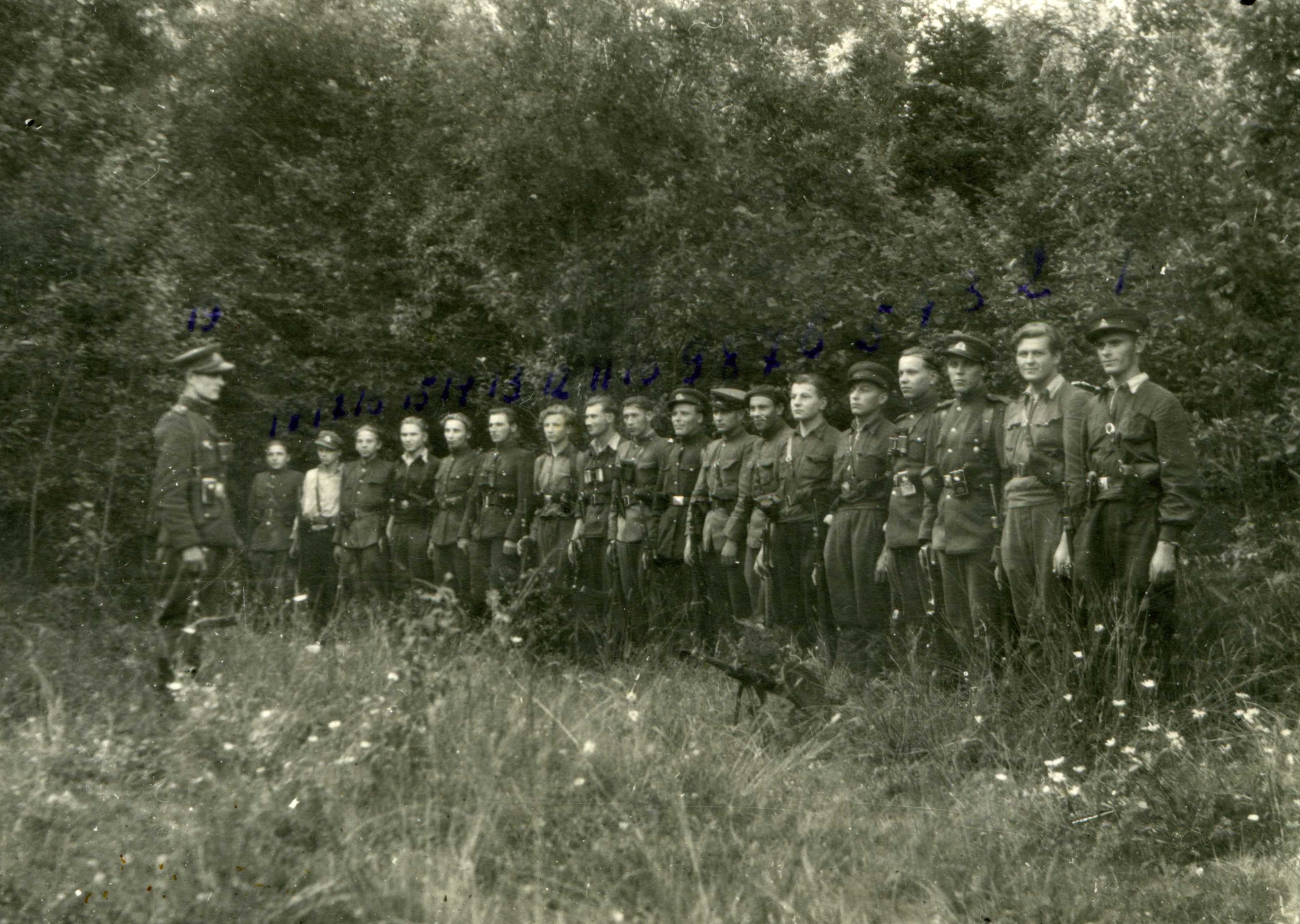
Lithuanian resistance fighters from the Dainava military district.

The resistance in Lithuania was well organized, and uniformed guerrilla units with a chain of command were effectively able to control whole regions of the countryside until 1949. Their armaments included Czech Škoda guns, Russian Maxim heavy machine guns, assorted mortars and a wide variety of mainly German and Soviet light machine guns and submachine guns. When not directly fighting the Soviet Army or special NKVD units, they significantly delayed the consolidation of Soviet rule through ambush, sabotage, assassination of local Communist activists and officials, freeing imprisoned guerrillas, and printing underground newspapers. Captured Lithuanian Forest Brothers often faced torture and summary execution, while their relatives faced deportation to Siberia (cf. quotation). Reprisals against pro-Soviet farms and villages were harsh. The NKVD units (known by the Lithuanians as pl. stribai, from the Russian: istrebiteli – destroyers) used cruel repression to discourage further resistance, e.g. displaying executed partisans' corpses in village courtyards.

The partisans were well-armed. During 1945–1951 Soviet repressive structures seized from partisans 31 mortars, 2,921 machine guns, 6,304 assault rifles, 22,962 rifles, 8,155 pistols, 15,264 grenades, 2,596 mines, and 3,779,133 cartridges. The partisans usually replenished their arsenal by killing istrebiteli, members of Soviet secret-police forces or by purchasing ammunition from Red Army soldiers. Every partisan had binoculars and few grenades. One grenade was usually saved to blow themselves and their faces to avoid being taken as prisoner, since the physical tortures of Soviet MGB/NKVD were very brutal and cruel, and being recognised, to prevent their relatives from suffering.

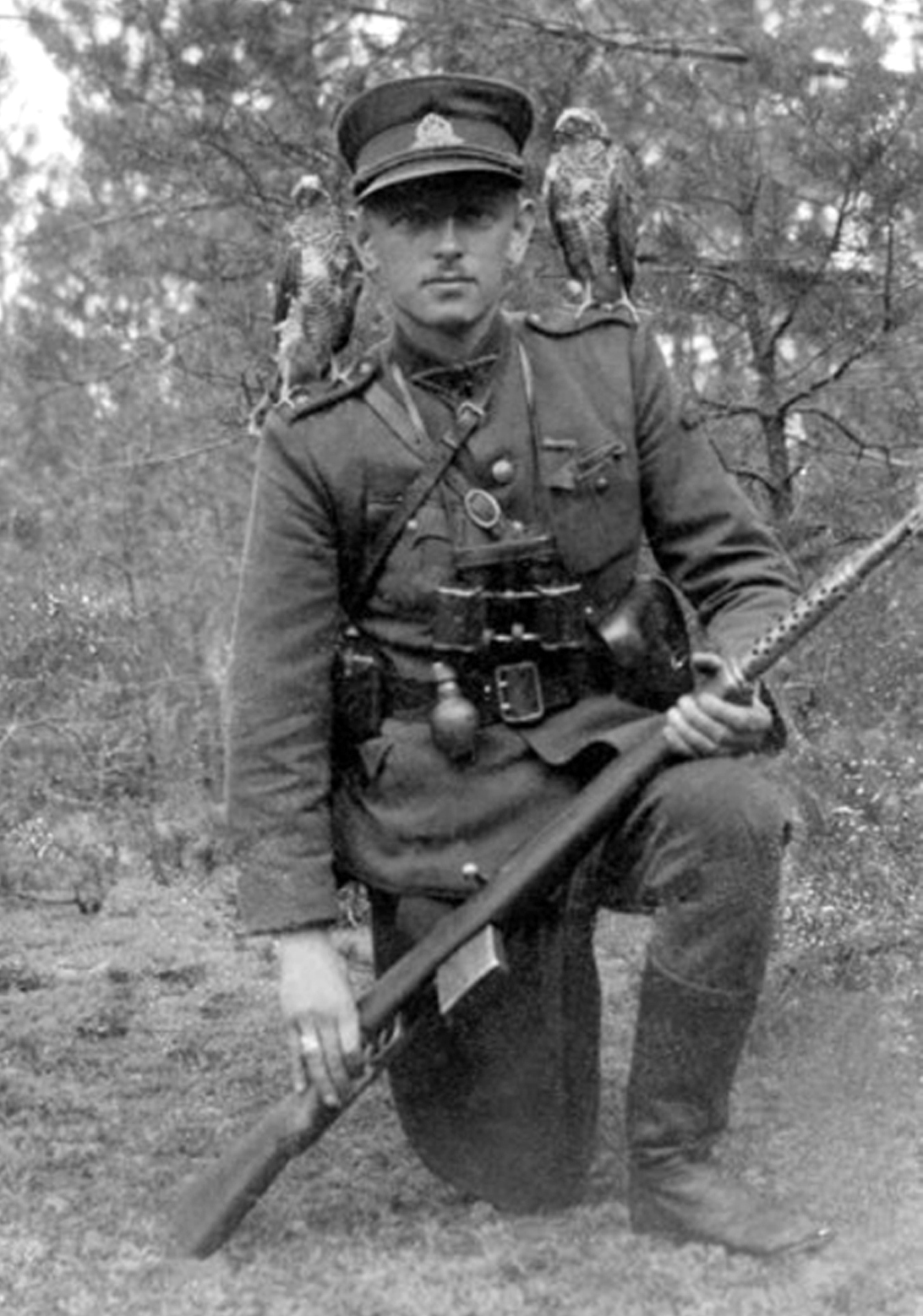
Partisan commander Adolfas Ramanauskas-Vanagas in 1947

== Armed resistance ==
People killed (MGB data)
Year	Partisans	Soviets	Pro-Soviet civilians
1944	2,436	258	258
1945	9,777	3,419	447
1946	2,143	2,731	493
1947	1,540	2,626	299
1948	1,135	1,673	256
1949	1,192	1,018	338
1950	635	494	261
1951	590	292	195
1952	457	92	62
1953	198	14	10
Total	20,103	12,617	2,619

=== Rise: summer 1944 – summer 1946 ===
In the first year of partisan warfare, about 10,000 Lithuanians were killed – about half of the total deaths. Men avoided conscription to the Red Army and hid in the forests, spontaneously joining the Lithuanian partisans. Not all groups were armed or intended to actively fight the Soviets. Partisan groups were relatively large, 100 men and more. There were several larger open engagements between the partisans and NKVD, like in Kalniškė, Paliepiai, Seda, Virtukai, Kiauneliškis, Ažagai-Eimuliškis and the village of Panara. Since the Soviets had not established control, the partisans controlled entire villages and towns.

In July 1945, after the end of World War II, the Soviets announced an "amnesty" and "legalization" campaign for those hiding in the forests to avoid conscription. According to a Soviet report from 1957, in total 38,838 people came forward under the campaign (8,350 of them were classified as "armed nationalist bandits" and 30,488 as deserters avoiding conscription).

=== Maturity: summer 1946–1948 ===
In the second stage of partisan warfare, the partisan groups became smaller but better organized. They organized themselves into units and military districts and sought better centralization. The territory of Lithuania was divided into three regions and nine military districts (Lithuanian: apygarda):

- Southern Lithuanian or Nemunas: Tauras and Dainava districts,
- North – Eastern Lithuanian or Kalnų (Mountains): Algimantas, Didžioji Kova, Vytis and Vytautas districts,
- Western Lithuanian or Jūros (Sea): Kęstutis, Prisikėlimas and Žemaičiai districts.

Open engagements with NKVD/MGB were replaced by more clandestine activities. It was important to keep up people's spirits. Therefore, the partisans hid in bunkers and engaged in political and propaganda activities. In particular they protested and disrupted elections to the Supreme Soviet of the Soviet Union in February 1946 and to the Supreme Soviet of the Lithuanian SSR in February 1947. They published bulletins, leaflets and newspapers. Almost 80 different periodicals were published by the partisans. MGB also changed its tactics and began to recruit agents and organize destruction battalions. The partisans responded by organizing reprisal actions against collaborators with the Soviets.

To combat the guerrillas, in May 1948 the Soviets carried out the largest deportation yet from Lithuania, Operation Spring, and some forty to fifty thousand people associated with the "forest brothers" were deported to Siberia.

=== Decline: 1949–1953 ===
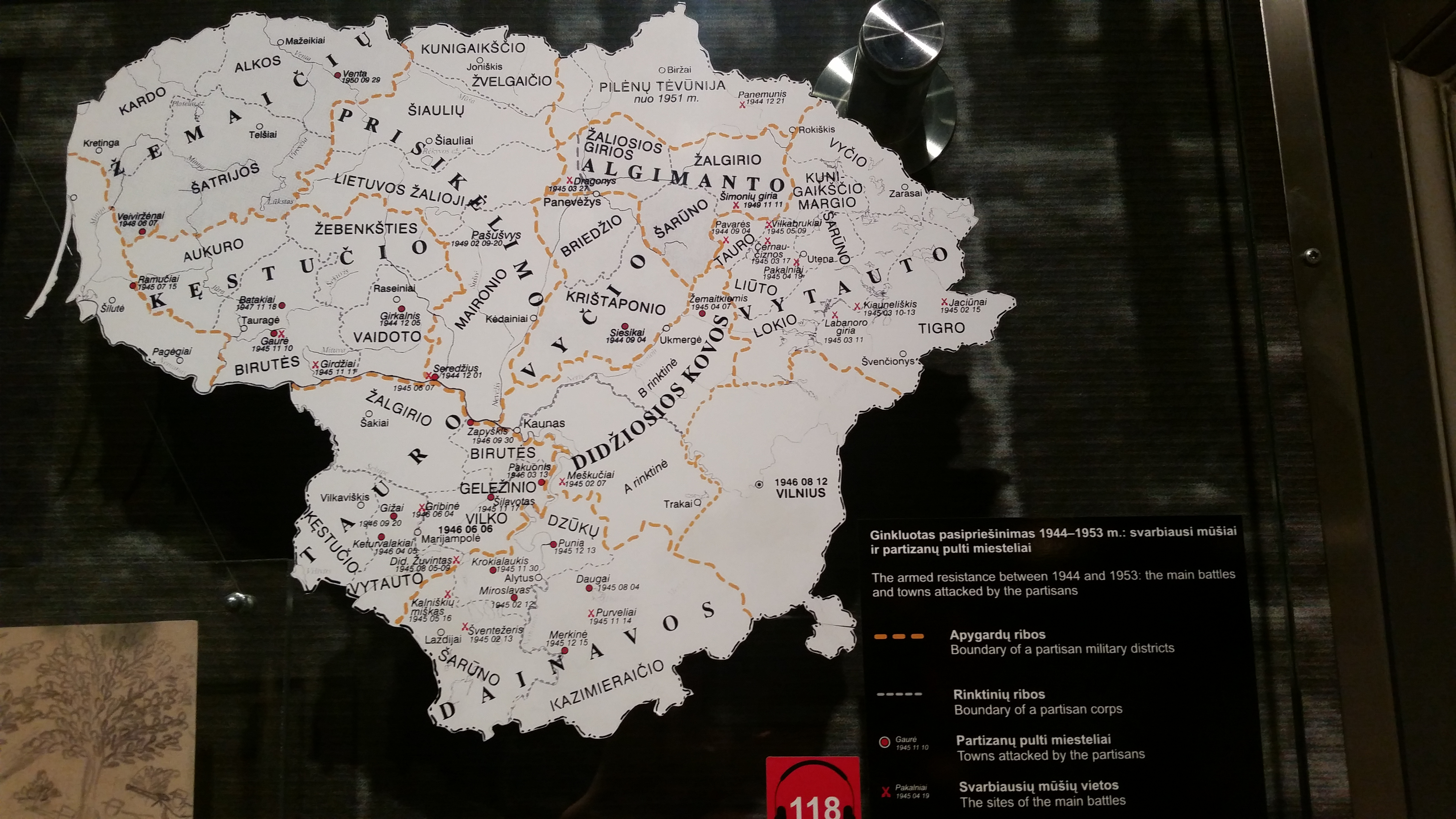
Museum of Occupations and Freedom Fights map indicating partisan areas of operation

In February 1949, partisan leaders met in the village of Minaičiai and established a centralized command, the Union of Lithuanian Freedom Fighters. Brigadier General Jonas Žemaitis was elected chairman. On February 16, 1949, the 31st anniversary of the Act of Independence of Lithuania, the Joint Staff of the Union of Lithuanian Freedom Fighters signed a declaration on the future of Lithuania stating that the reinstated Lithuania should be a democratic state that would grant equal rights for every citizen based on freedom and democratic values. It did declare that the Communist party was a criminal organization. The document of the declaration survived and was preserved by the KGB. In 1999, the Lithuanian Seimas (parliament) formally recognized this declaration as a Declaration of Independence.

Juozas Lukša was among those who managed to escape to Western countries; he wrote his memoirs – Forest Brothers: The Account of an Anti-Soviet Lithuanian Freedom Fighter, 1944–1948 – in Paris, and was killed after returning to occupied Lithuania in 1951. By the early 1950s, the Soviet forces had eradicated most of the Lithuanian nationalist resistance. Intelligence gathered by the Soviet spies in the West and KGB infiltrators within the resistance movement, in combination with large-scale Soviet operations in 1952, managed to end the campaigns against them.

Adolfas Ramanauskas (code name Vanagas), the last official commander of the Union of Lithuanian Freedom Fighters, was arrested in October 1956 and executed in November 1957. The last Lithuanian anti-Soviet resistance fighters killed in action were Pranas Končius (code name Adomas) and Kostas Liuberskis (code name Žvainys). Končius was killed on July 6, 1965 (some sources say he shot himself on July 13 in order to avoid capture) and awarded the Cross of Vytis in 2000, which was later revoked in 2015 due to his involvement in the Holocaust. Liuberskis was killed on October 2, 1969; his fate was unknown until the late 2000s. Stasys Guiga (code name Tarzanas) died in hiding in 1986.

== Structure ==
LLKS
Western Lithuania (Jūra) region	Southern Lithuania (Nemunas) region	Eastern Lithuania (King Mindaugas) region
Žemaičiai military district	Prisikėlimas military district	Kęstutis military district	Tauras military district	Dainava military district	Algimantas military district	Vytautas military district	Vytis military district	Didžioji Kova military district
Alka	Maironis	Vaidotas	Vytautas	Dzūkas	Žalioji	Tigras	Krikštaponis
Šatrija	Duke Žvelgaitis	Birutė	Žalgiris	Šarūnas	Šarūnas	Liūtas	Briedis
Kardas	Juozapavičius	Butigeidis	Geležinis vilkas	Kazimieraitis	Duke Margiris	Lokys
Lietuvos žalioji

== Aftermath, memorials and remembrances ==
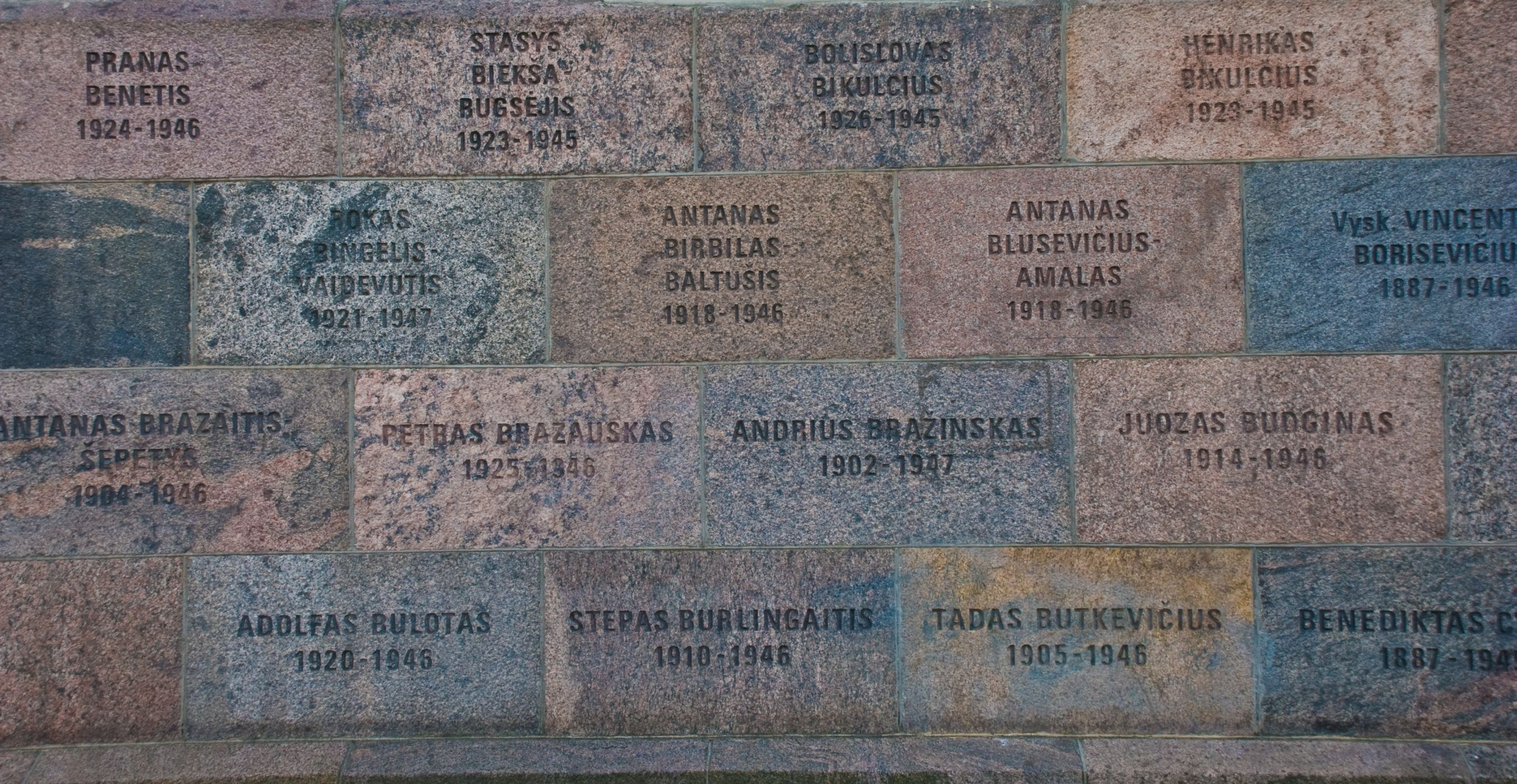
Wall of former KGB headquarters in Vilnius inscribed with names of those tortured and killed in its basement (now Museum of Occupations and Freedom Fights).

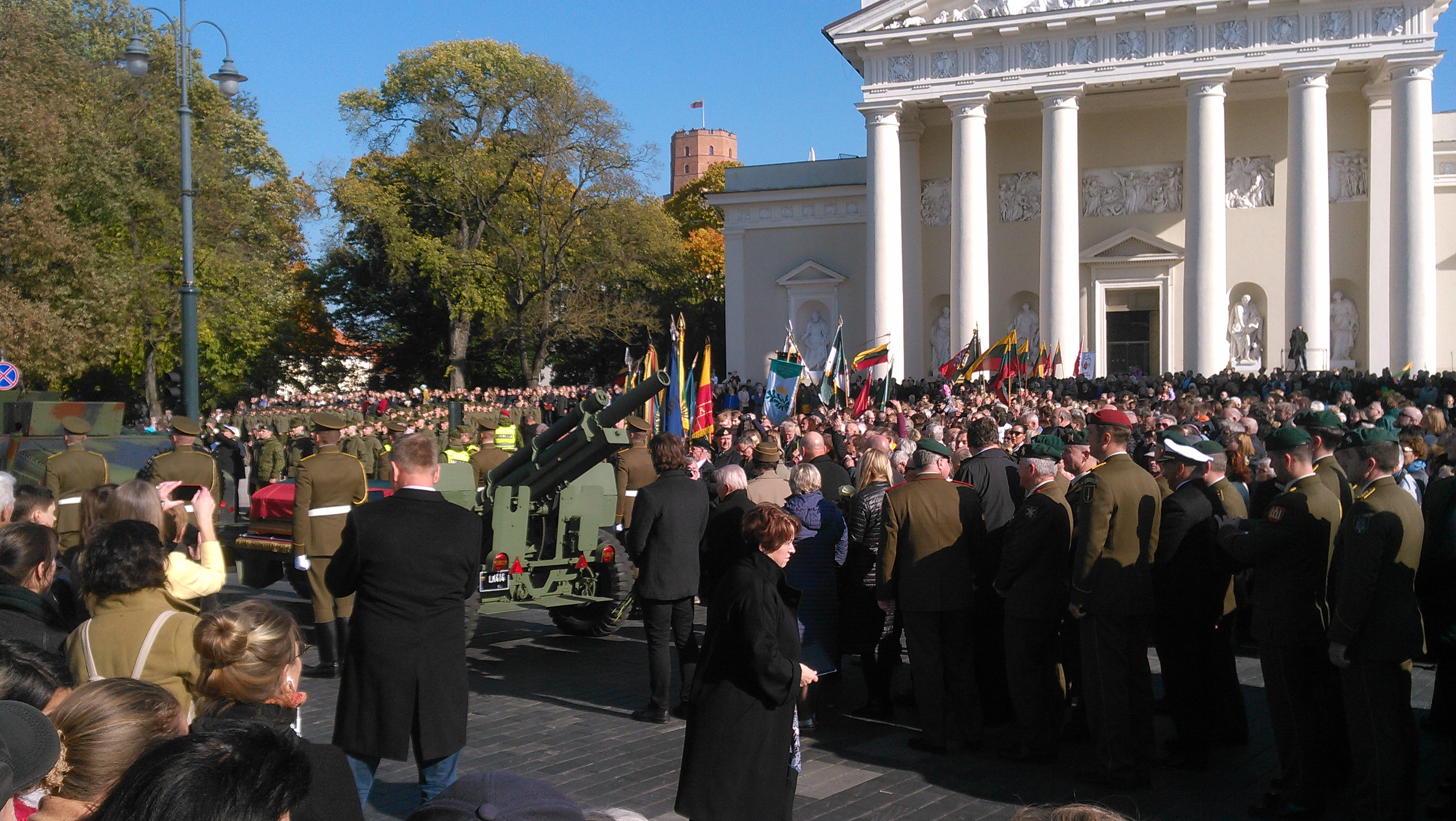
State funeral of the Lithuanian partisan commander Adolfas Ramanauskas-Vanagas (1918–1957), 2018

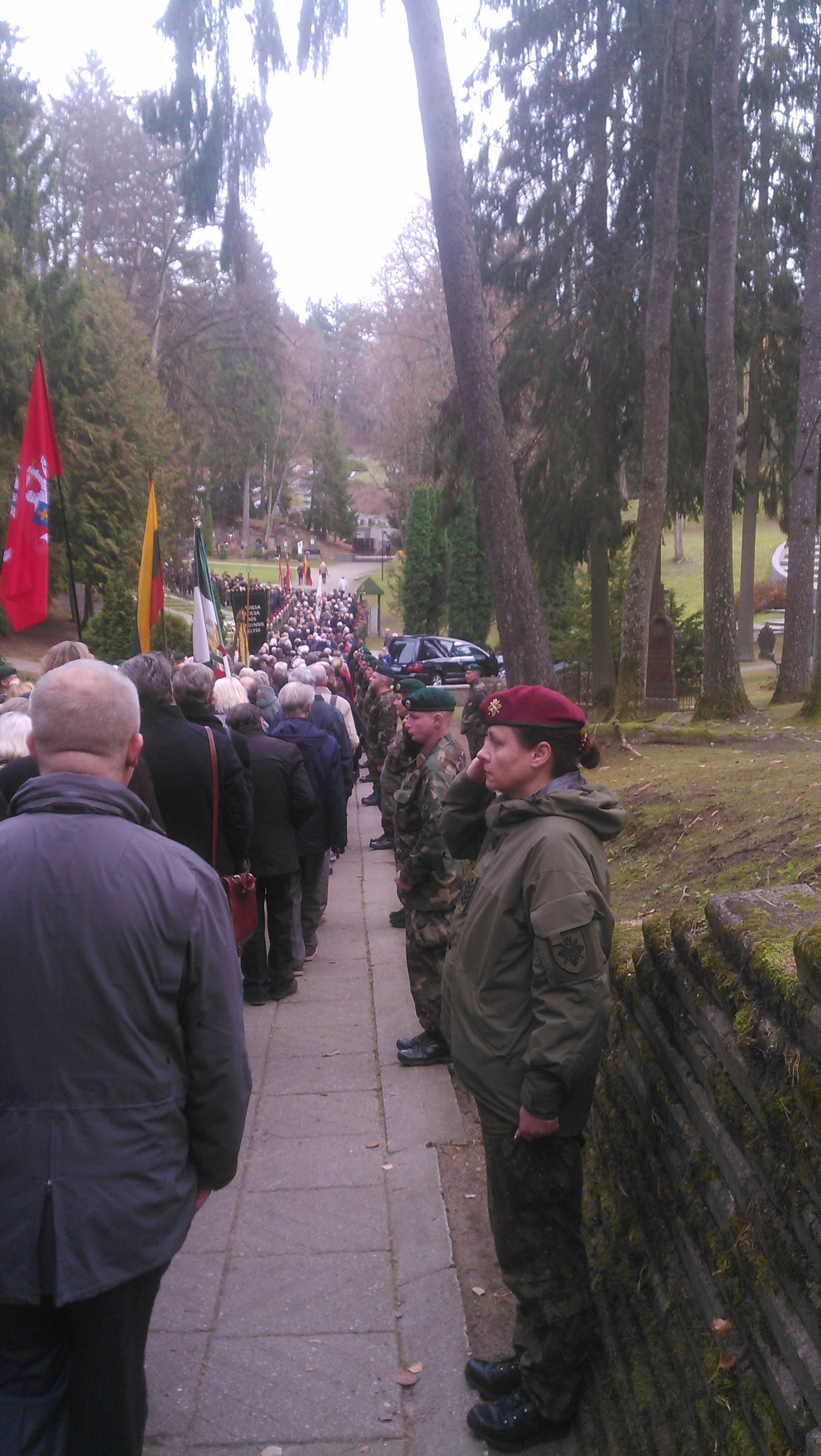
State funeral of the last Lithuanian anti-Soviet partisan A. Kraujelis-Siaubūnas (1928–1965), 2019

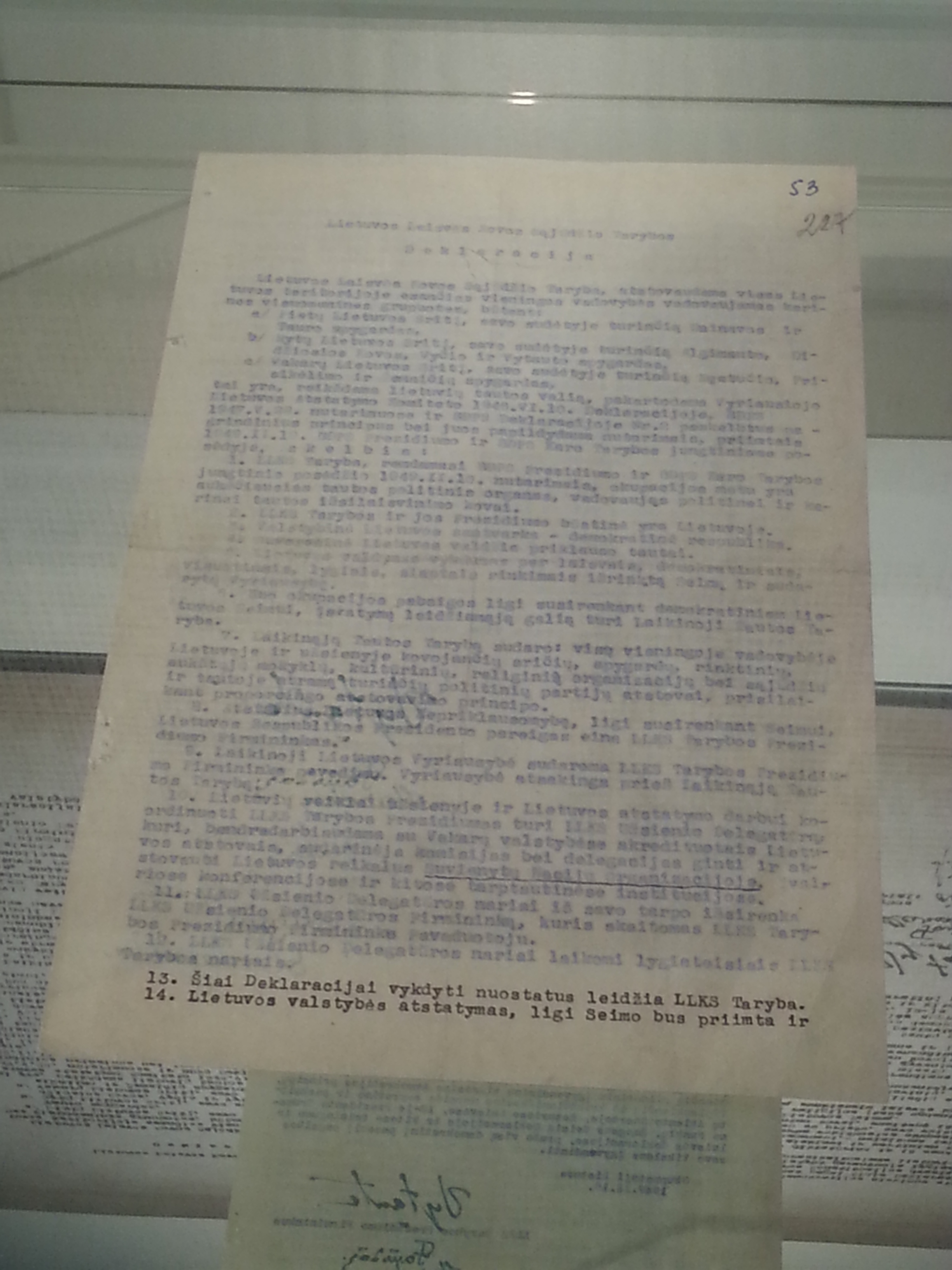
Lithuanian Partisans Declaration of February 16, 1949, exhibited in 2019

Many nationalist partisans persisted in the hope that Cold War hostilities between the West, which never formally recognized the Soviet occupation, and the Soviet Union might escalate to an armed conflict in which Lithuania would be liberated. This never materialized, and many of the surviving former partisans remained bitter that the West did not take on the Soviets militarily.

As the conflict was relatively undocumented by the Soviet Union (the Lithuanian fighters were never formally acknowledged as anything but "bandits and illegals"), some consider it and the Soviet-Lithuanian conflict as a whole is an unknown or forgotten war. Discussion of resistance was suppressed under the Soviet regime. Writings on the subject by the Lithuanian emigrants were often labelled by Soviet propaganda as examples of "ethnic sympathy" and disregarded.

In Lithuania, freedom fighter veterans receive a state pension. The third Sunday in May is commemorated as Partisan's Day. As of 2005, there were about 350 surviving partisans in Lithuania.

Žaliukas ("Green man") is the Lithuanian partisan-inspired qualification patch in the Lithuanian Special Operations Forces given to the very best. Žaliukas is the word for the state of alert of the unyielding part of the nation in the face of danger.

=== Legal assessment ===
Lithuanian courts view Soviet repressions against Lithuanian partisans as crimes against humanity. In 2016, the Supreme Court of Lithuania ruled that the systematic extermination of the partisans by the Soviet regime constituted a genocide. In 2019, the European Court of Human Rights upheld the view of the national courts that these Soviet repressions could be deemed genocide.

=== Dramatizations ===
The 1966 film Nobody Wanted to Die (Lithuanian: Niekas nenorėjo mirti) by Soviet-Lithuanian film director Vytautas Žalakevičius shows the tragedy of the "brother against brother" conflict. Despite being propaganda shot from a Soviet perspective, the film alludes to the possibility of alternative points of view. The film brought acclaim to Žalakevičius, and to a number of young Lithuanian actors starring in the film.

The 2004 film Utterly Alone (Lithuanian: Vienui Vieni) portrays the travails of Lithuanian partisan leader Juozas Lukša who traveled twice to Western Europe in attempts to gain support for the armed resistance.

The 2005 documentary film Stirna tells the story of Izabelė Vilimaitė (codenames Stirna and Sparnuota), an American-born Lithuanian who moved to Lithuania with her family in 1932. A medical student and pharmacist, she was an underground medic and source of medical supplies for the partisans, eventually becoming a district liaison. She infiltrated the local Komsomol (Communist Youth), and was twice discovered and captured, and escaped. After going underground full-time, she was suspected of having been turned by the KGB as an informant and was nearly executed by the partisans. Her bunker was eventually discovered by the KGB and she was captured a third time, interrogated and killed.

In 2008, an American documentary film, Red Terror on the Amber Coast was released, documenting the Lithuanian resistance to the Soviet occupation from the signing of the Molotov–Ribbentrop Pact in 1939 to the dissolution of the Soviet Union in 1991.

In 2014, The Invisible Front, a documentary focusing on Juozas Lukša, was released in the US.

In 2021, Icelandic composer and producer Ólafur Arnalds released a track titled Partisans, honoring the Lithuanian partisan resistance.

== See also ==
- Anti-Soviet partisans
- Guerrilla war in the Baltic states
- Estonian partisans
- Latvian partisans
- Territorial Unit (Lithuania)

== Notes and references ==
=== Sources ===
- Kaszeta, Daniel J. (Fall 1988). "Lithuanian Resistance to Foreign Occupation 1940–1952". Lituanus. 34 (3). ISSN 0024-5089.
- Kuodytė, Dalia; Tracevskis, Rokas (2004). The Unknown War: Armed Anti-Soviet Resistance in Lithuania in 1944–1953. Genocide and Resistance Research Centre of Lithuania. ISBN 9986-757-59-2.
- Vitkus, Gediminas, ed. (2014). Wars of Lithuania. Vilnius: General Jonas Žemaitis Military Academy of Lithuania. ISBN 978-609-437-250-6.
