= Jonas Misiūnas =

Commander of the anti-Soviet Lithuanian partisans

Colonel Jonas Misiūnas

Commander of the Didžioji Kova military district
- In office 1945 – 14 August 1946
- Succeeded by: Mečislovas Kareckas

Personal details
- Born: 15 January 1911 Valmoniai, Kovno Governorate, Russian Empire
- Died: 11 March 1947 (aged 36) Butyrka Prison, Moscow, Soviet Union
- Spouse: Ona-Vida Krivickaitė
- Children: 5
- Occupation: Lithuanian partisan, hussar
- Known for: Partisan leader of the Didžioji Kova military district

Military service
- Allegiance: Lithuania
- Years of service: 1931-1940 (Lithuanian Army); 1944 (Lithuanian Territorial Defense Force); 1944–1947 (Lithuanian partisans)
- Rank: Viršila (first sergeant); Colonel (1998; posthumous)

Jonas Misiūnas also known by his codename Žalias Velnias (green devil) (15 January 1911 – 11 March 1947) was a commander of the anti-Soviet Lithuanian partisans and the founder of the Didžioji Kova military district.

Misiūnas joined the Lithuanian Army in 1931. During World War II, he worked in railway security and volunteered for the short-lived Lithuanian Territorial Defense Force. After the force was disbanded in May 1944, he went into hiding and started organizing men near Musninkai to fight the approaching Soviets. The group quickly numbered some 200 men and grew into the Didžioji Kova military district. The NKVD held Misiūnas's three young children as hostages but released his wife in hopes that she would persuade him to surrender. She was killed in February or March 1945. Misiūnas was arrested when he attended a meeting of partisan leaders (a trap organized by NKVD agents) in Vilnius in August 1946. He was executed in the Butyrka Prison in Moscow.

== Early life and service ==
Misiūnas was born in Valmoniai near Pušalotas in the present-day Panevėžys District Municipality into a family of a blacksmith. The family raised ten children, four sons and six daughters. The family did not own land or smithy and frequently changed their residences. He joined the Lithuanian Army in 1931. He served in a Hussar regiment in Kaunas and rose to the rank of viršila (equivalent to first sergeant).

After the Soviet occupation in June 1940, Misiūnas was dismissed from the army and returned to his birthplace. In 1941–1944, Misiūnas worked as the Wachtmeister of the railway security guards in the Kaišiadorys police force. They guarded the railway from the Soviet partisans. On 5 February 1944, he volunteered for the Lithuanian Territorial Defense Force, a Nazi-sponsored military unit commanded by general Povilas Plechavičius. On 16 February he started studying at the military courses organized by the Territorial Defence Force in Marijampolė. The force was disbanded in May and Misiūnas went into hiding.

== Anti-Soviet partisan ==
=== Leader of Didžioji kova ===
In early July 1944, as the Red Army approached Lithuania, Misiūnas started organizing men near Musninkai to fight against the Soviets. By the end of the month, his group had up to 200 fighters. In August 1944, it became known as the Didžioji Kova (Great Fight) detachment. It was a mobile unit frequently changing its locations.

On 15 January 1945, he met with Mečislovas Kestenis-Serbentas, a representative of the Lithuanian Liberty Army's Vilnius district. Misiūnas' partisan group was reorganized into the 5th sector of LLA's Vilnius District. Misiūnas became a deputy of Kestenis who now commanded the partisan unit until he was killed on 13 April 1945. On 1 December 1945, the name of the unit was once again changed to Didžioji Kova military district which had two detachments: A detachment active near Trakai and B detachment active near Ukmergė. The unit engaged NKVD forces several times. Misiūnas was injured in August 1945. Under Misiūnas, voters voting in favor of the USSR in state-sponsored elections and then attempting to join the partisans were to be shot.

In 1944–1946, the unit published newspapers like Laisvės keliu, Žalia giria, and Laisva Lietuva.

=== Persecution by NKVD ===
Misiūnas was followed by NKVD agents since July 1944. His wife Ona-Vida Misiūnienė (née Krivickaitė) and their seven-year old twins Kęstutis and Rimgaudas were arrested on 5 January 1945. In prison, she gave birth to another son, Vytautas. She was released on 10 January while her three children were kept as hostages. NKVD hoped that she would persuade Misiūnas to surrender. She made contact with the partisans on 4 February 1945 but was killed in a shootout in Pigonys and was secretly buried Čiobiškis. According to other sources, she was killed in March 1945 when NKVD discovered and attacked the headquarters of Misiūnas' men in Čiobiškis. The children remained as hostages until December 1945 when they were transferred to an orphanage in Čiobiškis and later in Kaliningrad.

In spring 1946, Misiūnas established contacts with Juozas Markulis, an MGB agent. Misiūnas wanted that the military district would be commanded by an army officer. Markulis recommended Viktoras Pečiūras-Kapitonas Griežtas (agent Gediminas), who was made the official commander of the district on 16 July 1946. He posed himself as a representative of a non-existent "central committee", and promised to provide the partisans with fraudulent documents for them to live "legally", and as such demanded their signatures with pictures, as well as ordered them to put their weapons in special warehouses, only to be used in certain situations. He also ordered the underground press machines to be sent to the "center", from which a unified partisan newspaper would be published. The newspaper, entitled Vienybė (unity) propagated passive resistance rather than armed combat. Agent Gediminas also offered Misiūnas to travel abroad in the United Kingdom to study war strategy. This way the NKVD obtained lists of partisans, their liaisons and important locations. Pečiūras then invited Misiūnas to a meeting of partisan commanders in Vilnius. Misiūnas was arrested and imprisoned and later transported to the Butyrka prison in Moscow. It is believed that he was executed on 11 March 1947 though there is no documentary evidence to support the date. For several months after his arrest, the NKVD sent communications in the name of Misiūnas to the Didžioji Kova military district.

== Awards and remembrance ==
Misiūnas was posthumously promoted to colonel in 1998 and awarded the Order of the Cross of Vytis, 2nd class, in 1999. In 2012, he became an honorary citizen of the Kaišiadorys District Municipality.

The square in front of the train station in Kaišiadorys was named after him. A monument to Misiūnas was unveiled on 26 August 2005 in the railway station in Kaugonys (where Misiūnas worked during World War II). It was funded by the Lithuanian Railways. He is also honored in the park dedicated to Didžioji Kova military district in Ukmergė.
