= Vytautas military district =

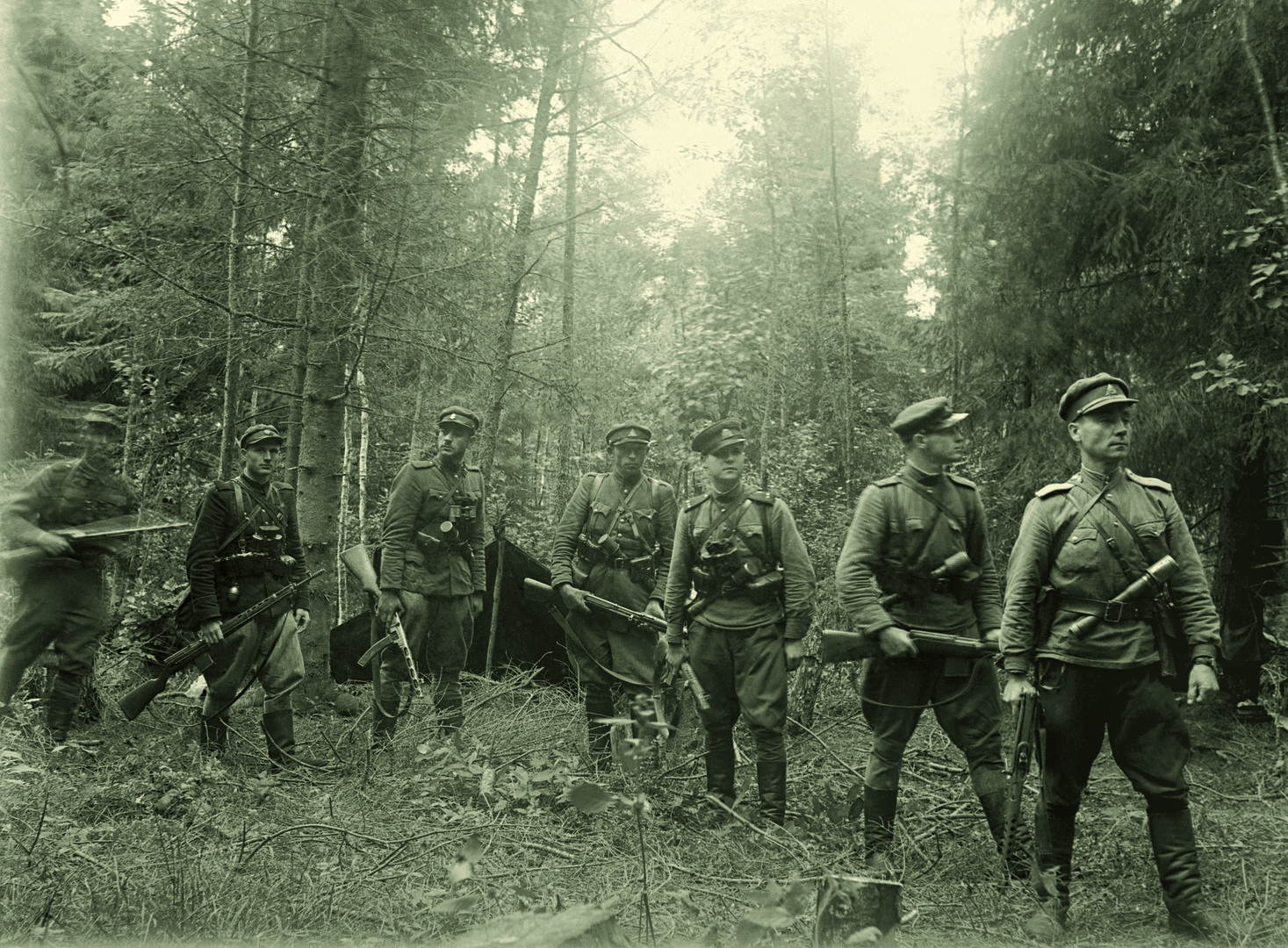
Partisans of the district in 1947

Vytautas military district (also Vytautas partisan military district) is a military district of Lithuanian partisans which operated in 1945–1951 in the counties of Švenčionys, Utena and Rokiškis. It is named after the Grand Duke of Lithuania Vytautas.

== Leaders ==
Name and surname	Nom de guerre	Since	Till	Comments
Jonas Kimštas	Dėdė, Dobilas, dėdė Jonas, Aukštaitis, Žalgiris, Žygūnas	1945 August	-	
Vladas Mikulėnas	Lubinas	1945 September	1945 December	died in the line of duty
Bronius Zinkevičius	Artojas	1945 December	1946 October	died in the line of duty
Jonas Kimštas	Dėdė, Dobilas, dėdė Jonas, Aukštaitis, Žalgiris, Žygūnas	1946 October	1947 June	
Vincas Kaulinis	Miškinis	1947 June	1949 March	died in the line of duty
Bronius Kalytis	Siaubas	1949 June	1951 December	

== Structure of Lithuanian partisans' organisation ==
LLKS
Western Lithuania (Jūra) region	Southern Lithuania (Nemunas) region	Eastern Lithuania (King Mindaugas) region
Žemaičiai military district	Prisikėlimas military district	Kęstutis military district	Tauras military district	Dainava military district	Algimantas military district	Vytautas military district	Vytis military district	Didžioji Kova military district
Alka	Maironis	Vaidotas	Vytautas	Dzūkai	Žalioji	Tigras	Krikštaponis
Šatrija	Duke Žvelgaitis	Birutė	Žalgiris	Šarūnas	Šarūnas	Liūtas	Briedis
Kardas	Juozapavičius	Butageidis	Geležinis vilkas	Kazimieraitis	Duke Margiris	Lokys
Lietuvos žalioji
