= Dainava military district =

Lithuanian military district 1945–1951

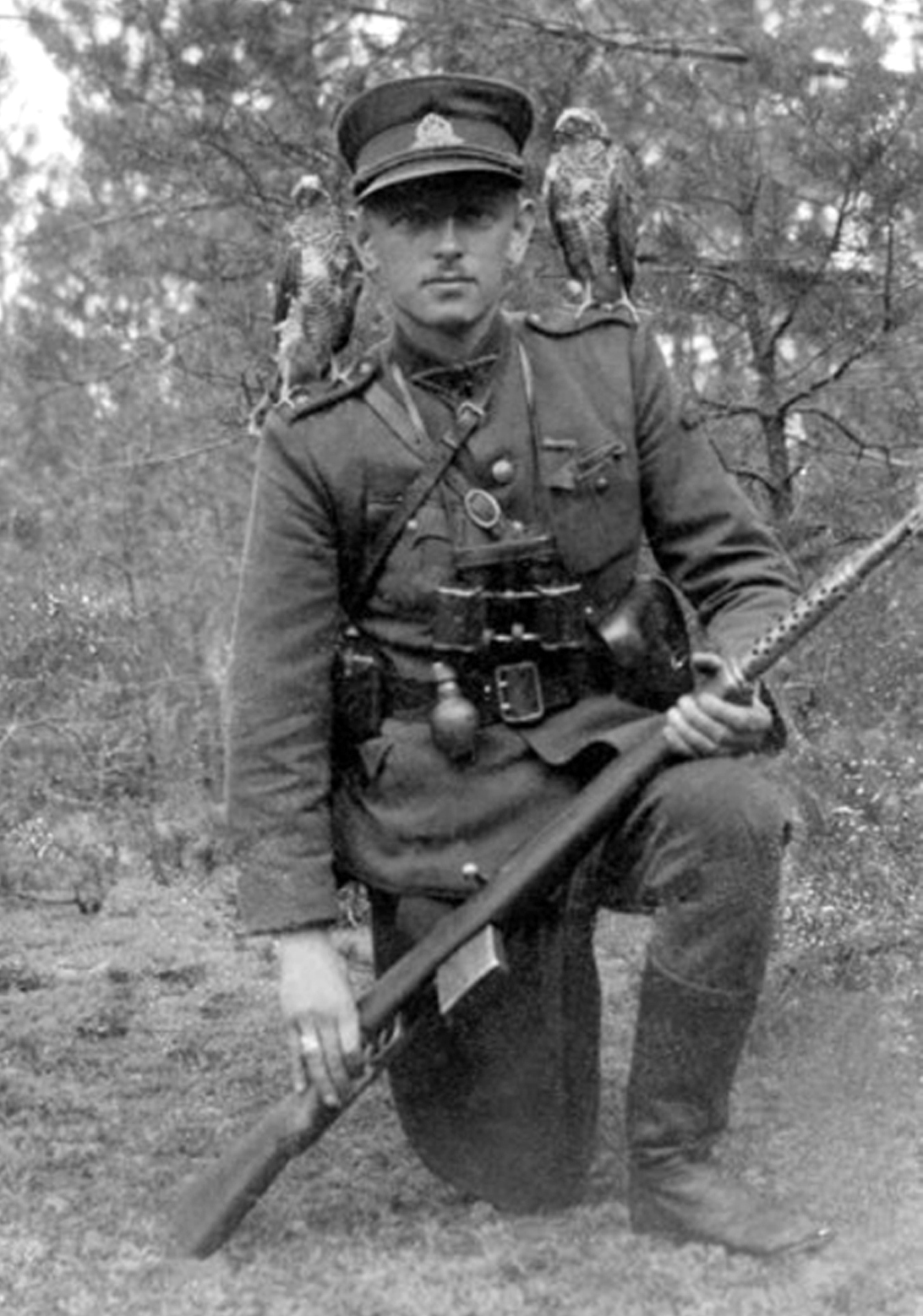
Adolfas Ramanauskas-Vanagas, one of the leaders of the Lithuanian resistance.

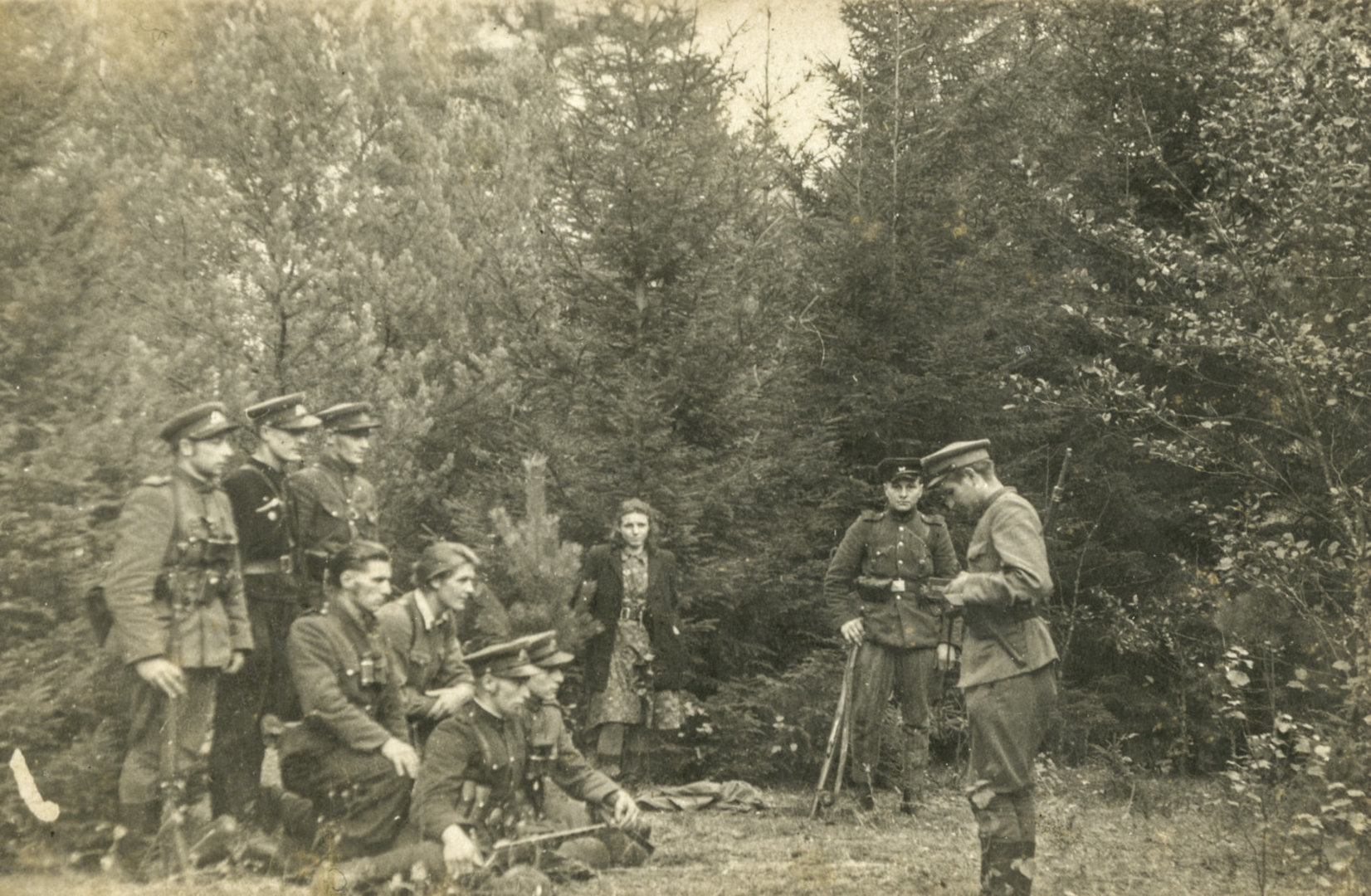
Partisans of the district in 1950

Dainava military district (also Dainava partisans military district) is a military district of Lithuanian partisans which operated in 1945–1951 in the counties of Alytus, Lazdijai and Varėna in Dainava (Dzūkija). The most significant battles: on May 17, 1945, in the Kalniškės Forest of the Simnas rural district in the Alytus district (44 partisans killed, about 400 NKVD members killed); on June 14, 1945, in the Varčia Forest of the Daugai rural district (40 partisans killed or were arrested, about 176 NKVD members were killed).

== Leaders ==
Name and surname	Nom de guerre	Since	Till	Comments
Juozas Vitkus	Kazimieraitis	1945 November	1946 May	
Dominykas Jėčys	Ąžuolis	1946 May	1947 August	
Adolfas Ramanauskas	Vanagas	1947 August	1948 September	
Benediktas Labėnas	Kariūnas	1948 September	1949 March	died in the line of duty
Lionginas Baliukevičius	Dzūkas	1949 May	1950 June	died in the line of duty
Juozas Gegužis	Diemedis	1950 June	1951 September	
Vincas Daunoras	Ungurys	1951 September	1952 May	died in the line of duty

== Structure of Lithuanian partisans' organisation ==
LLKS
Western Lithuania (Jūra) region	Southern Lithuania (Nemunas) region	Eastern Lithuania (King Mindaugas) region
Žemaičiai military district	Prisikėlimas military district	Kęstutis military district	Tauras military district	Dainava military district	Algimantas military district	Vytautas military district	Vytis military district	Didžioji Kova military district
Alka	Maironis	Vaidotas	Vytautas	Dzūkai	Žalioji	Tigras	Krikštaponis
Šatrija	Duke Žvelgaitis	Birutė	Žalgiris	Šarūnas	Šarūnas	Liūtas	Briedis
Kardas	Juozapavičius	Butageidis	Geležinis vilkas	Kazimieraitis	Duke Margiris	Lokys
Lietuvos žalioji
