= Nedzingė =

Coordinates: 54°15′N 24°20′E

- Village
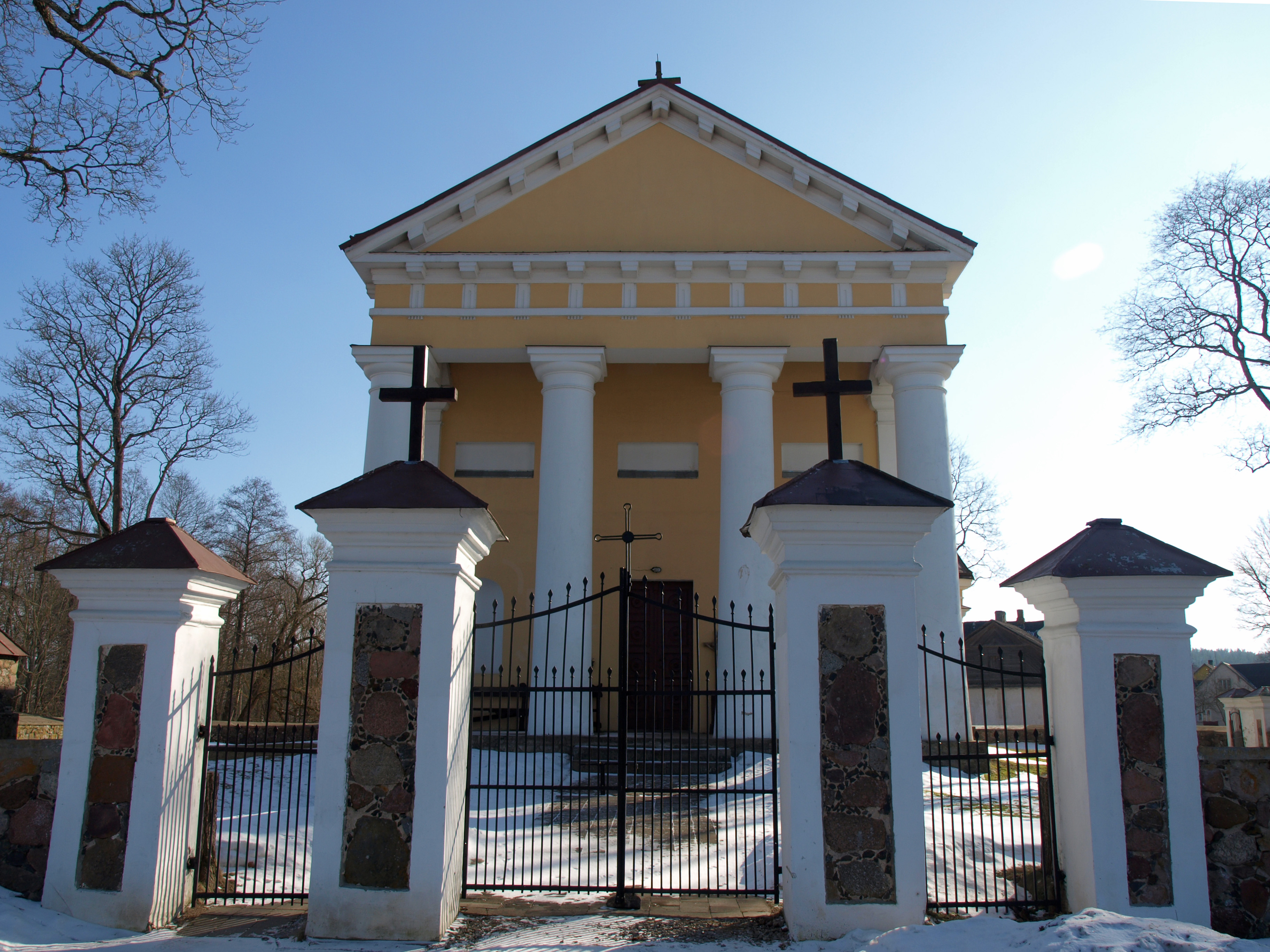
- Interactive map of Nedzingė
- Country: Lithuania
- County: Alytus County
- Municipality: Varėna

Population (2001)
  - Total: 288
- Time zone: UTC+2 (EET)
  - Summer (DST): UTC+3 (EEST)

Nedzingė is a village in Varėna district municipality, in Alytus County, in southeastern Lithuania. According to the 2001 census, the village has a population of 288 people.
