= Tauras military district =

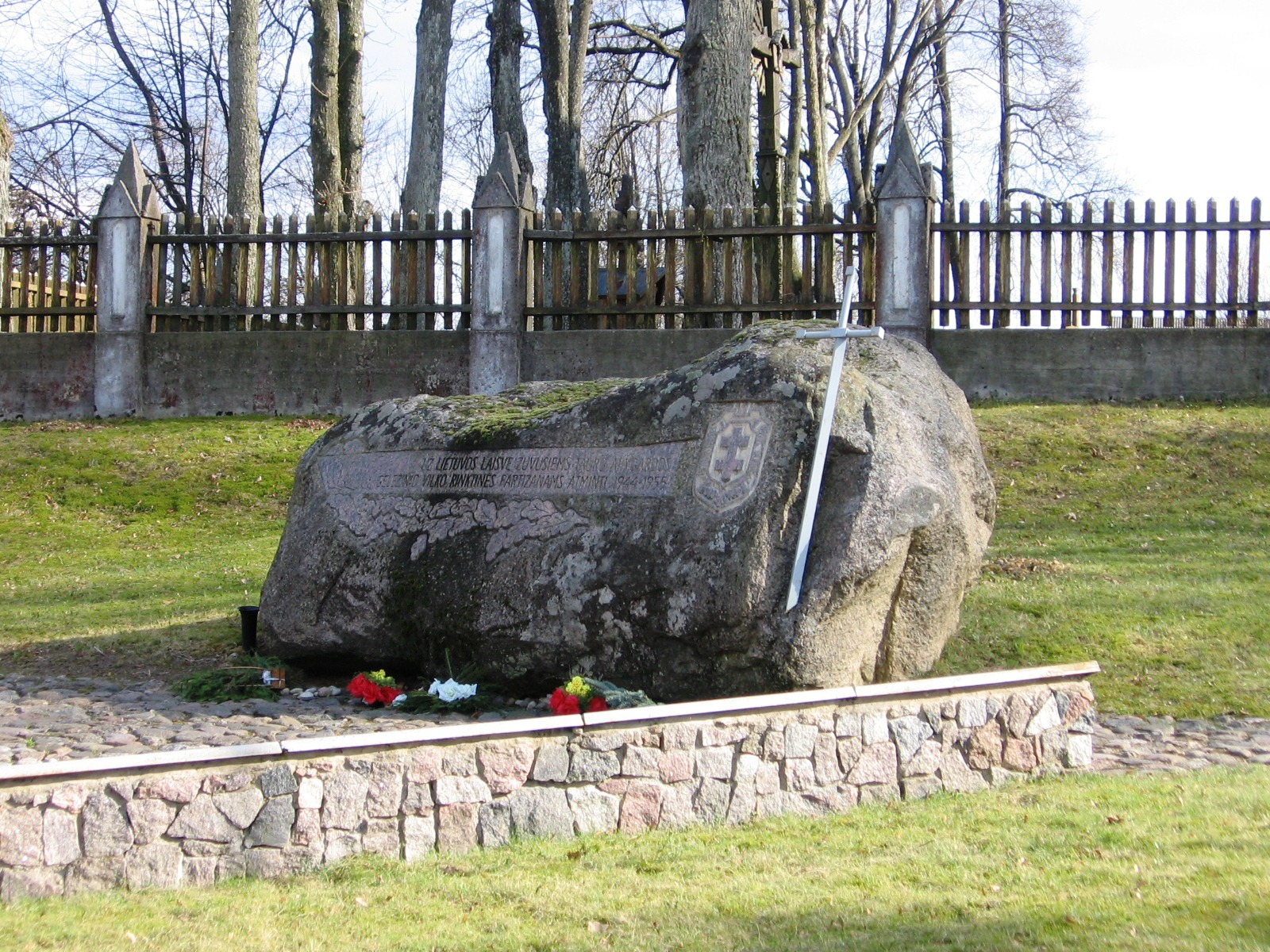
A monument to partisans of Tauras military district in Šilavotas

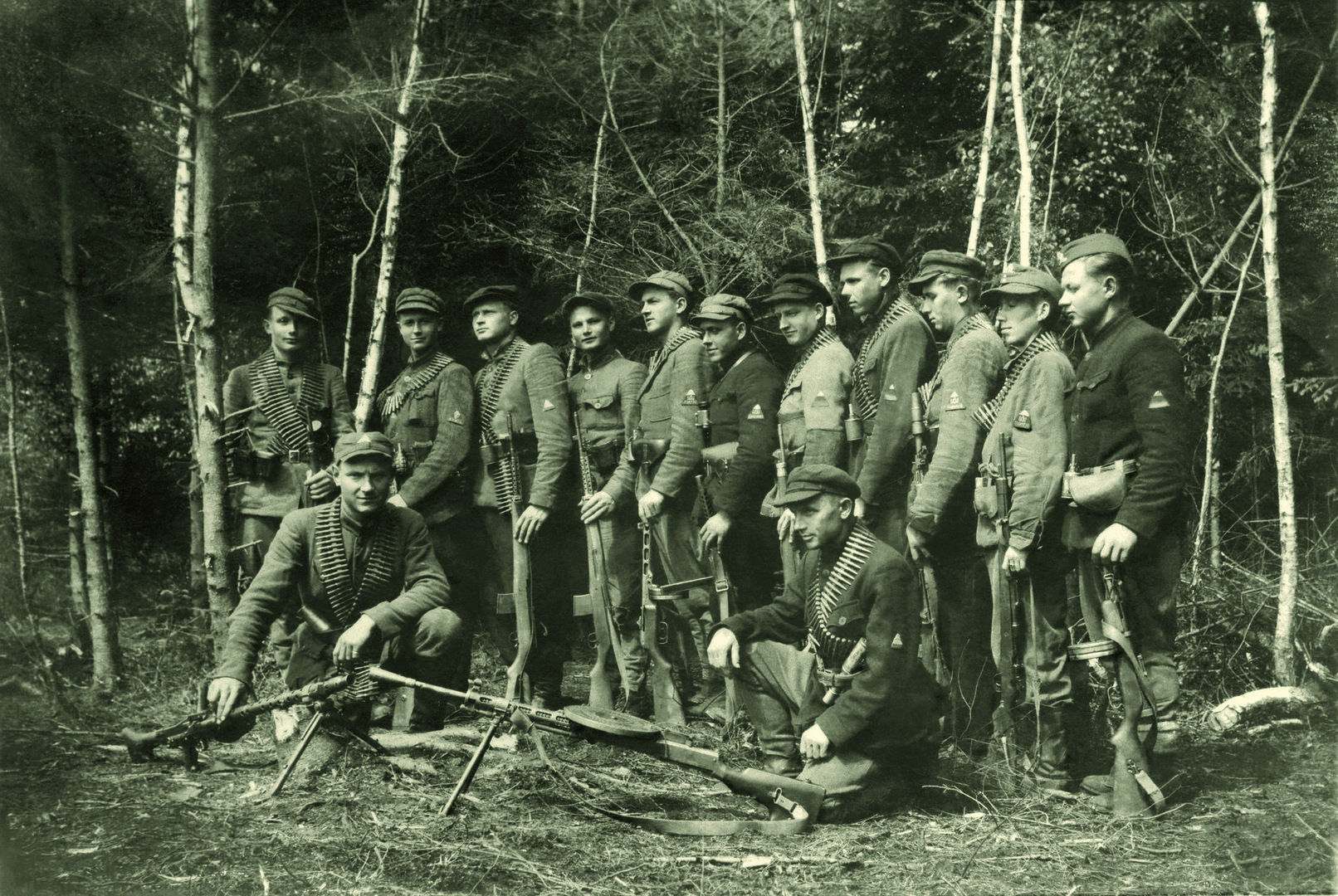
Partisans of the district in 1945

Tauras military district (also Tauras partisans military district) is a military district of Lithuanian partisans which operated in 1945–1951 in the Suvalkija ethnographic region – counties of Marijampolė, Šakiai, Vilkaviškis and in the left bank of the Nemunas river in counties of Alytus and Kaunas. One of the most important partisan districts. It is named after aurochs - tauras in Lithuanian.

== Leaders ==
Name and surname	Nom de guerre	Since	Till
Leonas Taunys	Kovas	1945 August	1945 October
Zigmas Drunga	Mykolas	1946 October	1946 June
Antanas Baltūsis	Žvejas	1946 July	1948 February
Jonas Aleščikas	Rimantas	1948 April	1948 August
Aleksandras Grybinas	Faustas	1948 August	1949 September
Viktoras Vitkauskas	Saidokas	1949 October	1951 February
Juozas Jankauskas	Demonas	1951 April	1952 June

== Structure of Lithuanian partisans' organisation ==
LLKS
Western Lithuania (Jūra) region	Southern Lithuania (Nemunas) region	Eastern Lithuania (King Mindaugas) region
Žemaičiai military district	Prisikėlimas military district	Kęstutis military district	Tauras military district	Dainava military district	Algimantas military district	Vytautas military district	Vytis military district	Didžioji Kova military district
Alka	Maironis	Vaidotas	Vytautas	Dzūkai	Žalioji	Tigras	Krikštaponis
Šatrija	Duke Žvelgaitis	Birutė	Žalgiris	Šarūnas	Šarūnas	Liūtas	Briedis
Kardas	Juozapavičius	Butageidis	Geležinis vilkas	Kazimieraitis	Duke Margiris	Lokys
Lietuvos žalioji
