= Union of Lithuanian Freedom Fighters =

Paramilitary organization based in Lithuania

Union of Lithuanian Freedom Fighters or Movement for the Struggle for Lithuanian Freedom (Lithuanian: Lietuvos laisvės kovos sąjūdis or LLKS) was a resistance organization of the Lithuanian partisans, waging a guerrilla war against the Soviet Union in the aftermath of World War II. The organization was established on February 10, 1949, during a meeting of all partisan commanders in Minaičiai village. Jonas Žemaitis (codename Vytautas) was elected as the chairman of its presidium. On February 16, the 31st anniversary of the 1918 Act of Independence of Lithuania, the Union adopted a declaration proclaiming itself to be the supreme political and military authority in Lithuania. In 1996, after Lithuania regained independence in 1990, the Seimas (parliament) recognized the declaration as an official act of the Republic of Lithuania and Žemaitis as President of Lithuania. The organization and the partisan war were suppressed by the Soviet security agencies by 1953.

== Structure ==
LLKS
Western Lithuania (Jūra) region	Southern Lithuania (Nemunas) region	Eastern Lithuania (King Mindaugas) region
Žemaičiai military district	Prisikėlimas military district	Kęstutis military district	Tauras military district	Dainava military district	Algimantas military district	Vytautas military district	Vytis military district	Didžioji Kova military district
Alka	Maironis	Vaidotas	Vytautas	Dzūkai	Žalioji	Tigras	Krikštaponis
Šatrija	Duke Žvelgaitis	Birutė	Žalgiris	Šarūnas	Šarūnas	Liūtas	Briedis
Kardas	Juozapavičius	Butageidis	Geležinis vilkas	Kazimieraitis	Duke Margiris	Lokys
Lietuvos žalioji

== Sources ==
- "Lietuvos Laisvės Kovos Sąjūdis" (in Lithuanian). Seimas.
