= Petras Blieka =

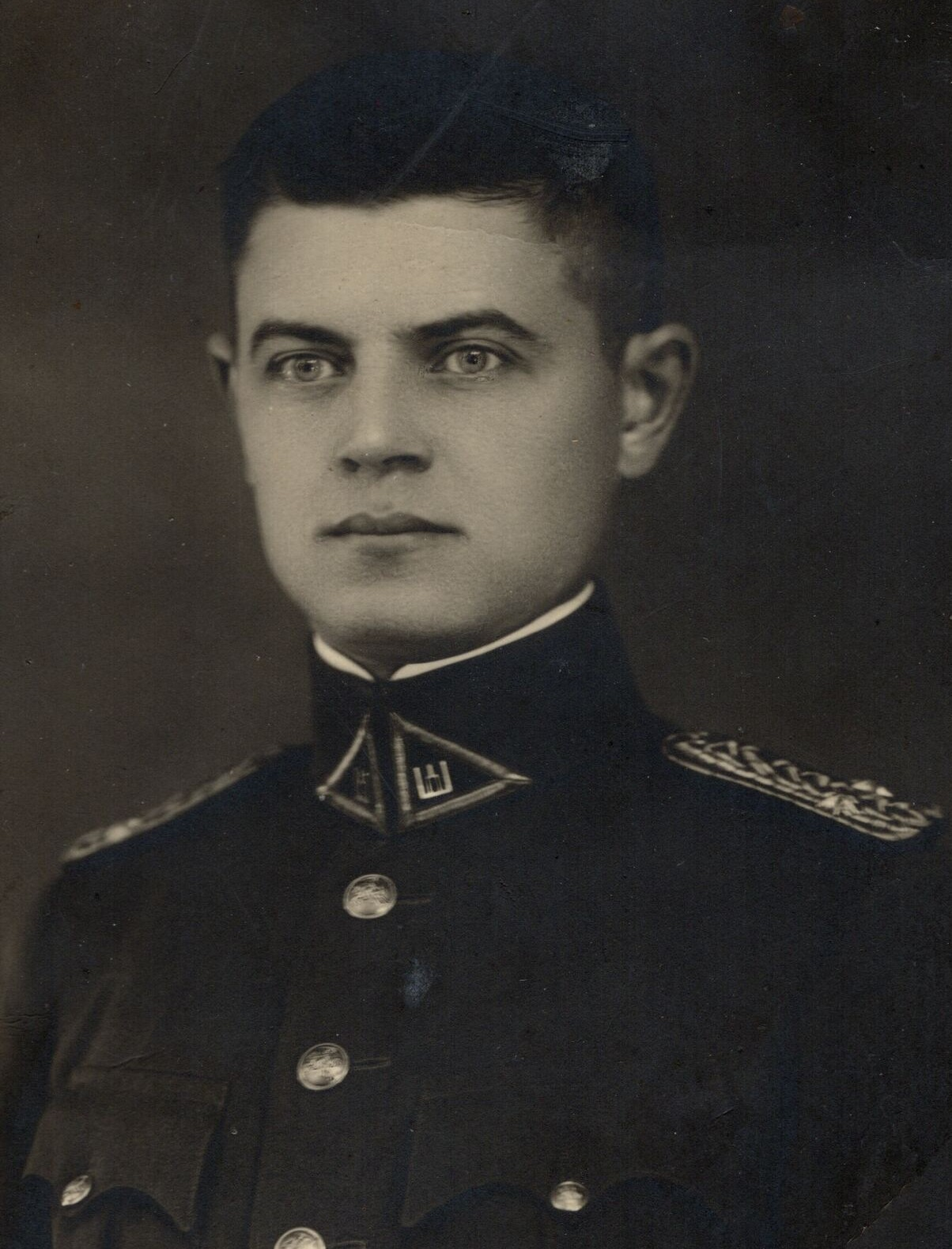
- Nicknames: Plerna, Bliekinis
- Born: 6 October 1910 Pavyžuoniai, Russian Empire
- Died: 13 November 1947 (aged 37) Jotainėliai, Lithuanian SSR
- Allegiance: Lithuanian partisans

Petras Blieka, also known by the codenames Plerna and Bliekinis (6 October 1910 – 13 November 1947) was a Lithuanian anti-Soviet partisan. He served as the second-in-command of Danielius Vaitelis, the commander of the Vytis military district.

== Biography ==
=== Early life ===
Petras Blieka was born on 6 October 1910 in Pavyžuoniai, then part of the Russian Empire. On 15 September 1935, Blieka graduated from the War School of Kaunas with the rank of junior lieutenant. He was assigned to the 1st Artillery Regiment's 4th battery. On 13 October 1938 Blieka was promoted to lieutenant. During the first stages of the Soviet occupation of Lithuania, Blieka served as a senior officer. After the Lithuanian Army was liquidated, Blieka was transferred to serve in an artillery regiment of the 29th Rifle Corps. During Operation Barbarossa, Blieka left the Red Army. In 1941, Petras Blieka participated in the June Uprising. During the German occupation of Lithuania, Blieka worked as the viršaitis of the Šeduva district.

=== Partisan ===
During the Soviet re-occupation of Lithuania in 1944, Blieka hid from Soviet mobilization in the village of Naujadvaris near Panevėžys. In Autumn 1945 Blieka became the leader of a partisan group of 60 people which was active around Ramygala, Raguva and Vadokliai. According to memoirs of a fellow partisan, Blieka's squad was subdivided into four units. Blieka, in total, commanded ten squads. On 27 March 1945 his squad participated in the Battle of Ažagai against the NKVD. Juozas Lukša notes that Blieka attacked Panevėžys that same year. In April 1947 Blieka became the second-in-command of Danielius Vaitelis and the commander of the Vytis military district headquarters. Along with Vaitelis's second substitute Juozas Survila, Blieka would visit subordinate partisans and give verbal orders rather than printed directives.

=== Death ===
Blieka was killed on 13 November 1947 in the village of Jotainėliai. His body was desecrated in Ramygala. The location of Blieka's burial place is unknown.

Both of Blieka's brothers were killed in action in 1946. His father, mother, sister, wife, and son were deported to Tomsk in 1947.

== Remembrance ==
On 8 July 1998 Blieka was recognized as a soldier-volunteer. On 19 August 1998 he was awarded the posthumous rank of captain.
