= Danielius Vaitelis =

Commander of the anti-Soviet Lithuanian partisans

Colonel Danielius Vaitelis
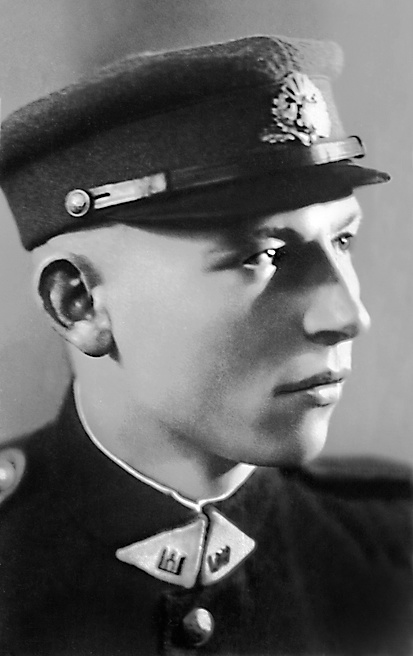

Commander of the Vytis military district
- In office 12 January 1945 – 13 May 1948
- Preceded by: Juozas Krikštaponis
- Succeeded by: Alfonsas Smetona

Personal details
- Born: 5 August 1913 Geležiai, Kovno Governorate, Russian Empire
- Died: 13 May 1948 (aged 34) Juodvisinė, Lithuanian SSR
- Spouse: Aleksandra Urbonaitė
- Children: 2
- Occupation: Lithuanian partisan

Military service
- Years of service: 1935–1940 (Lithuanian Army); 1940–1941 (Red Army); 1944–1948 (Lithuanian partisans)

Danielius Vaitelis, also known by the codenames Atamanas and Briedis (5 August 1913 – 13 May 1948) was an anti-Soviet Lithuanian partisan and the commander of the Vytis military district.

== Biography ==
=== Early life and service ===
Danielius Vaitelis was born on 5 August 1913 in the village of Geležiai, then part of the Russian Empire. His parents, Petras Vaitelis (1866–1941) and Marcijona Vaitelienė née Šlikaitė (1884–1963) were peasants. Vaitelis was the youngest of two brothers and two sisters. Vaitelis attended the Pagiriai primary school. He graduated from the Šėta middle school (progymnasium) in 1932. Vaitelis also briefly attended school in Kėdainiai. In 1933 he moved to Kaunas and began working at the Spindulys publishing house. After graduating from a teachers' union gymnasium, in 1935 he enrolled in the War School of Kaunas, from which he graduated in 1938 with the rank of artillery lieutenant. Vaitelis personally knew Jonas Žemaitis as they both served in the same regiment. In 1939 Vaitelis completed aviation reconnaissance courses.

=== Occupation ===
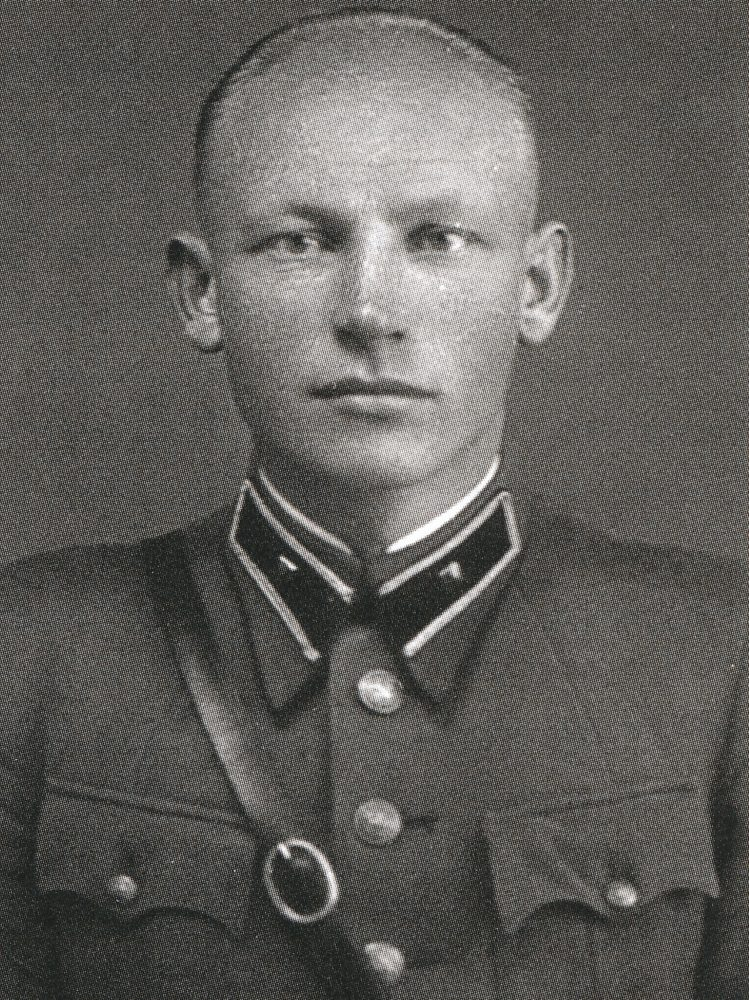
Danielius Vaitelis in the Red Army uniform

After the Soviet occupation of Lithuania in 1940, Vaitelis was moved to the 29th Rifle Corps 179th Rifle Division. However, possibly due to his disloyalty, he was moved to the reserve, and was soon forced to hide from the Soviet secret police. Avoiding arrest, Vaitelis fled to Germany in 1941, where he was educated on diversionary tactics in an Abwehr intelligence school in Prussia. A few days before the beginning of Operation Barbarossa, Vaitelis was sent back to Lithuania. He married Aleksandra Urbonaitė on 25 September 1941. Their children, Romualdas and Vita, were born in 1942 and 1944 respectively.

For the duration of the German occupation of Lithuania, Vaitelis upheld mostly good relations with the authorities. From 1943 to 1944, Vaitelis worked as a reporter at a finance board. In 1944, Vaitelis traveled to Marijampolė and for a brief time joined the Lithuanian Territorial Defense Force, where he lectured at the local war school. As the Eastern Front was closing in, the German authorities suggested Vaitelis retreat to the West. According to Vaitelis's wife's memoirs, Vaitelis strictly refused.

=== Partisan ===
In August 1944, the Lithuanian Liberty Army established three partisan districts around Deltuva. Vaitelis headed its first district, which comprised partisans around Siesikai, Pagiriai, and Deltuva. On 23–24 October 1944, Vaitelis headed a contingent of about fifty partisan volunteers in an attack on Pagiriai and later the Vaivadiškiai manor. During this operation, three people were freed from jail, and two collaborators were shot. Upon the creation of the Vytis military district in December 1944, Vaitelis was made the deputy of its leader, Juozas Krikštaponis. After Krikštaponis's death on 12 January 1945, Vaitelis succeeded him as leader. As the new commander, Vaitelis divided the military district into smaller detachments. Vaitelis is known to have declared amnesty for soldiers of the Soviet destruction battalions, who deserted and joined the partisans; it was the largest destruction battalion detachment in Lithuania that surrendered to Lithuanian partisans. On 1 May, Vaitelis led a successful assault on Siesikai. In October, Vaitelis's squad occupied Vadokliai. Juozas Lukša notes that Vaitelis and his group of partisans were involved in multiple attacks against an NKVD institution in 1945 in Kaunas, while his substitute commander Petras Blieka attacked Panevėžys. Vaitelis and his substitutes Juozas Survila and Petras Blieka would visit subordinate partisans and give verbal orders rather than printed directives.

In 1946, Vaitelis was contacted by Juozas Markulis (whom he knew in independent Lithuania), a secret MGB agent who had gained the trust of the partisans. Vaitelis and his contingent of partisans were surrounded on 13 May 1948 near the village of Juodvisinė. Vaitelis's companions died, while Vaitelis shot himself. It is believed they were buried near a school in Taujėnai. After the death of Vaitelis, the Vytis military district was headed by Alfonsas Smetona. The Briedis detachment was named after him in 1949.

== Remembrance ==
An iron cross was built at his death site in 1997. In 1998, Vaitelis was awarded the Order of the Cross of Vytis, 3rd degree.
