= Partisan (military) =

Member of a resistance movement

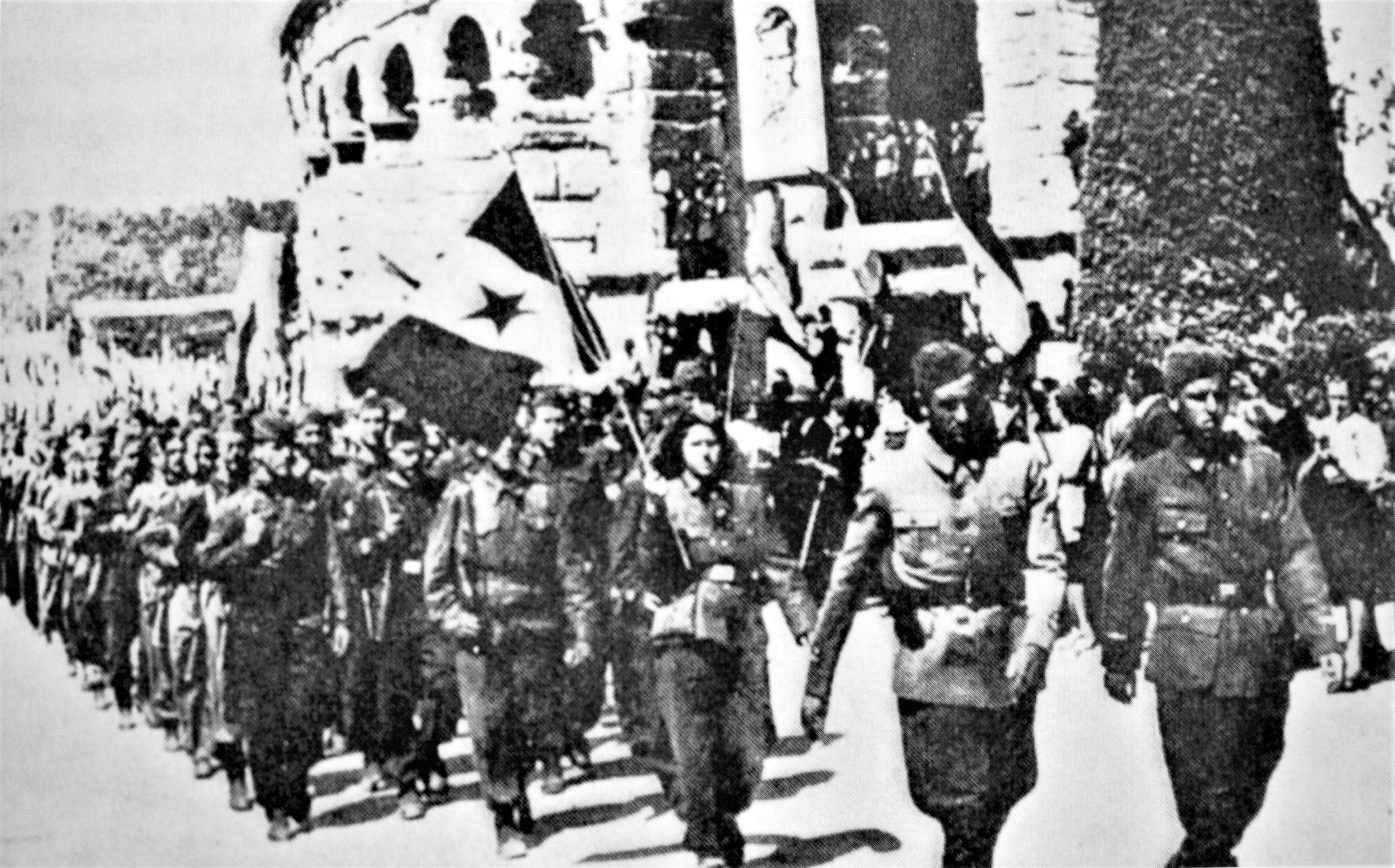
Italian partisan battalion in the liberated town of Pula, 8th of May 1945

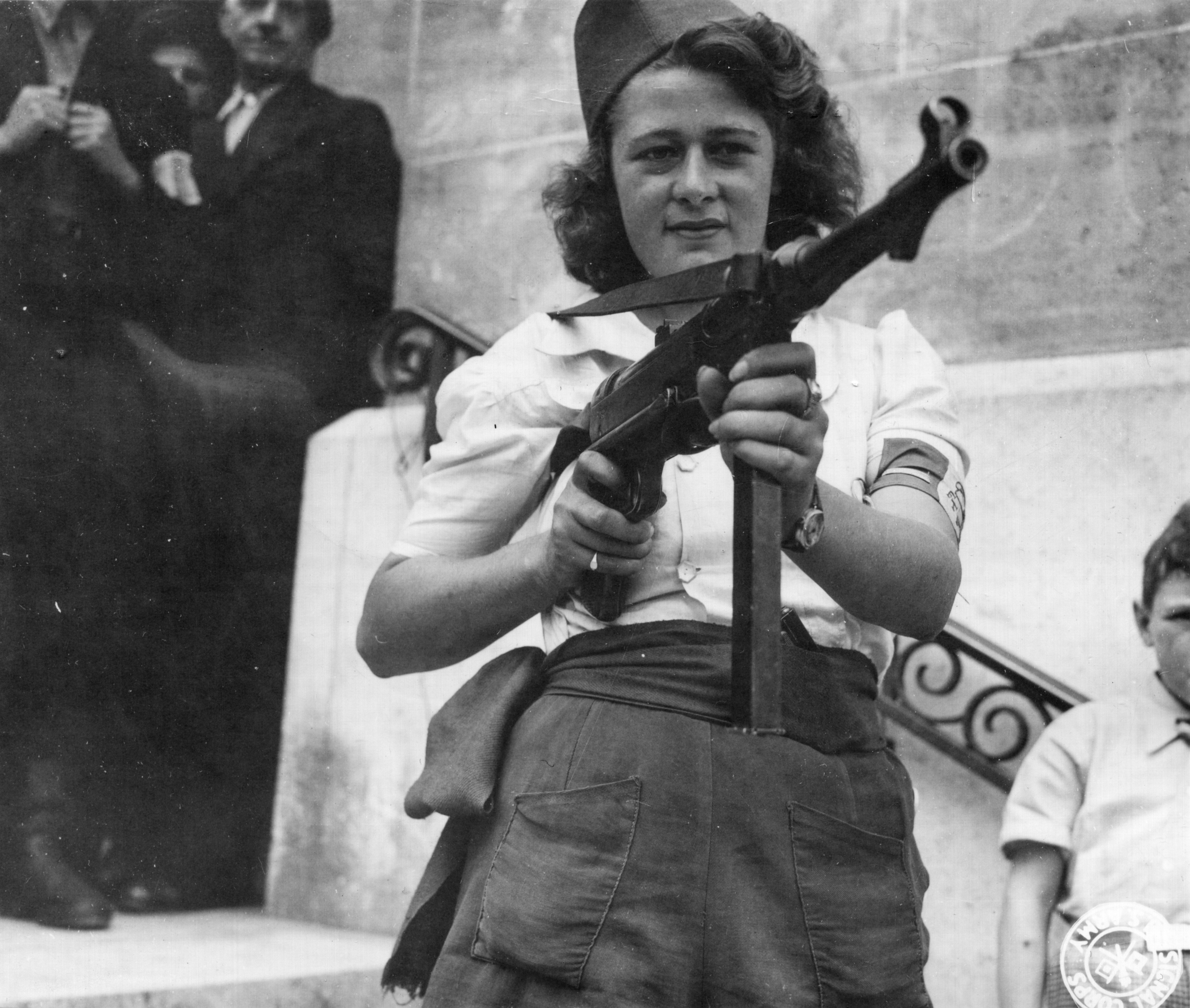
Simone Segouin, a French partisan credited with capturing 25 German soldiers in the Chartres area, poses with an MP 40 submachine gun, 23 August 1944

A partisan (US: /ˈpɑːr.tə.zən/; UK: /ˌpɑː.tɪˈzæn/; also partizan) is a member of a domestic irregular military force formed to oppose control of an area by a foreign power or by an army of occupation through some form of insurgent activity.

The term can apply to the field element of resistance movements. The most common use in present parlance in several languages refers to occupation resistance fighters during World War II, especially under the Yugoslav partisan leader Josip Broz Tito.

== History before 1939 ==
The initial concept of partisan warfare involved the use of troops raised from the local population in a war zone (or in some cases regular forces) who would operate behind enemy lines to disrupt communications, seize posts or villages as forward-operating bases, ambush convoys, impose war taxes or contributions, raid logistical stockpiles, and compel enemy forces to disperse and protect their base of operations.

George Satterfield has analyzed the "partisan warfare" (French: petite guerre, lit. 'little war') in the Netherlands campaigns of 1673–1678 during the Franco-Dutch War of 1672–1678. Some of the practices of ninjas in feudal Japan resembled irregular partisan warfare.

De Jeney, a Hungarian military officer who served in the Prussian Army as captain of military engineers during the Seven Years' War of 1756–1763, produced one of the first manuals of partisan tactics in the 18th century: The Partisan, or the Art of Making War in Detachment... (English translation published in London in 1760.) Johann von Ewald described techniques of partisan warfare in detail in his Abhandlung über den kleinen Krieg ("Treatise on little war", Cramer: Cassel, 1785).

The concept of partisan warfare would later form the basis of the "Partisan Rangers" of the American Civil War of 1861–1865. In that war, Confederate States Army Partisan leaders, such as John S. Mosby, Jesse James, William Quantrill, and Bloody Bill Anderson, operated along the lines described by von Ewald (and later by both Jomini (1779–1869) and Clausewitz (1780–1831)). In essence, 19th-century American partisans were closer to commando or ranger forces raised during World War II than to the partisan forces which would operate in Nazi-occupied Europe. Mosby-style fighters would have been legally considered uniformed members of their state's armed forces.

Partisans in the mid-19th century were substantially different from raiding cavalry, or from unorganized/semi-organized guerrilla forces.

Russian partisans played a crucial part in the downfall of Napoleon. Their fierce resistance and persistent inroads helped compel the French emperor to retreat from Russia after invading in 1812 (e.g., the activities of Denis Davydov). The Boers also deployed the concept of partisan warfare with their kommandos during the Second Boer War of 1899–1902.

Imperial Russia also made use of partisans in World War I, for example Stanisław Bułak-Bałachowicz.

== By region ==
=== French ===
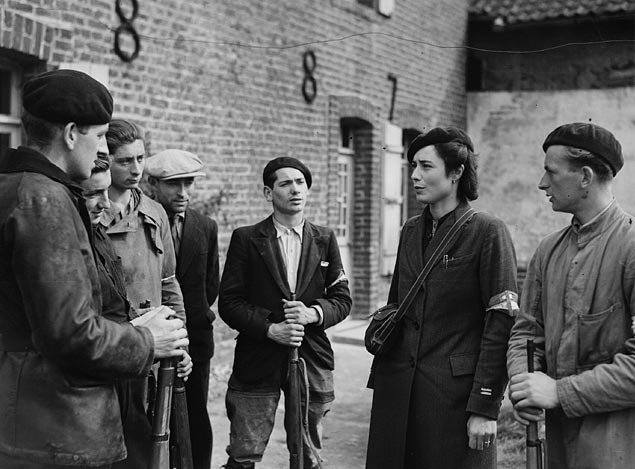
French partisans from a maquis in La Trésorerie, Normandy, September 1944.

French resistance during World War II arose after the armistice in June 1940 and the creation of the collaborationist Vichy regime. Charles de Gaulle, military leader exiled in London, led the Free French Army. It fought alongside the Allies and rallied the various French overseas colonies to fight back against the Vichy régime and the Axis forces in Africa and the Pacific.

Meanwhile, various resistance groups were created by working class men refusing to be drafted for forced labour in Germany. Fleeing into forests and mountains, they created maquis, which became increasingly more organized and armed as the war went on. They had an estimated 25,000 to 40,000 members in autumn of 1943 and approximately 100,000 members in June 1944.

Communist resistance started actively organizing after the invasion of the Soviet Union in June 1941. Their armed movement was the Francs-Tireurs et Partisans (FTP). By 1944, the FTP had an estimated strength of 100,000 men. Some killed high-ranking German officers, but these assassination were soon abandoned after the German execution of dozens of hostages in retaliation. They conducted sabotage (mostly train derailing) and guerilla warfare.

In 1943, de Gaulle sent Jean Moulin to unite the various resistance groups under one single organization, the National Council of the Resistance.

In 1944, the French Forces of the Interior (FFI) numbered more than 100,000 men and played a great role in helping the allied forces succeed at the Normandy landings and the Battle of Normandy. Free French forces (both interior resistance and the French Liberation Army) successfully liberated Paris in August 1944.

French partisans were also joined by resistance fighters of other nationalities, such as Armenians (Manouchian group), Poles or Spanish republicans in exile.

=== Greek ===
The Greek resistance during World War II arose in response to the triple occupation of Greece by Nazi Germany, Fascist Italy, and Bulgaria from April 1941 to October 1944. Germany controlled strategic areas like Athens and Crete, Italy held most of the mainland and islands until its surrender in September 1943, and Bulgaria annexed parts of Macedonia and Western Thrace. As early as the Battle of Crete in the last third of May 1941, German paratroops encountered mass resistance from the civilian population. Among the earliest acts of defiance, on May 30, 1941, students Manolis Glezos and Apostolos Santas tore down the Nazi swastika from the Acropolis. In June 1941, soon after the fall of Crete, the Supreme Committee of Cretan Struggle (AEAK) was formed. It was the first armed resistance organization, launching intelligence gathering and organizing the evacuation of stranded Allied soldiers to Egypt.

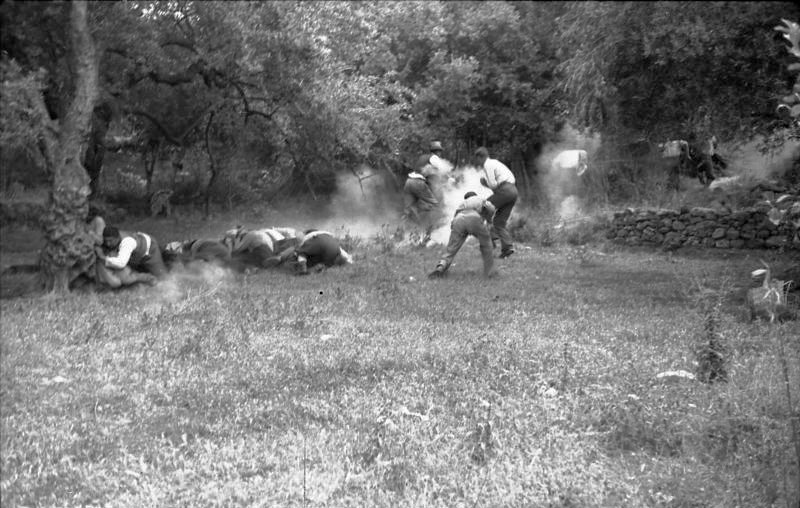
Civilians being shot at in Kondomari, Greece, 1941

The occupation's hardships, including the Great Famine of 1941–42, which claimed the lives of approximately 300,000 civilians, fueled resistance. Resistance groups, known as andartes, created "Free Greece" by mid-1943, controlling roughly 30,000 km² with 750,000 inhabitants. To counter resistance, harsh reprisals against civilians were extensively inflicted. Entire villages were burned and mass executions carried out, such as the massacres of Kandanos (June 1941, ~180 killed), Kommeno (August 1943, ~320 killed), Viannos (September 1943, ~500 killed), Kalavryta (December 1943, ~500 killed), Distomo (June 1944, ~218 killed), and the shootings of Kaisariani (May 1944, 200 killed). Such collective punishment targeting civilians in response to partisan actions left nearly 1 million homeless and 50,000–70,000 executed overall.

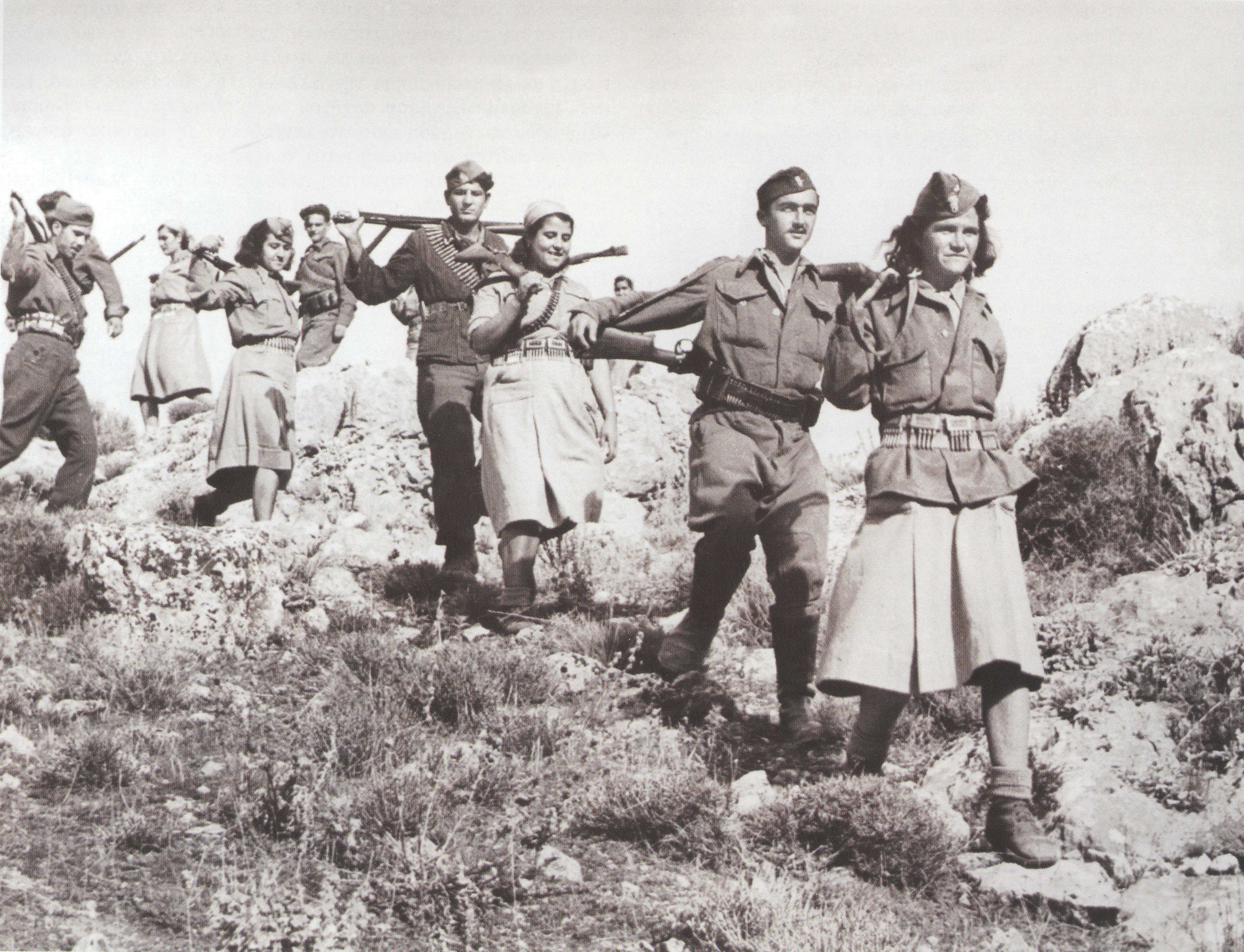
EAM-ELAS partisans in 1944.

The largest resistance groups were the communist-led National Liberation Front (EAM) and its military arm, the Greek People's Liberation Army (ELAS), with over 50,000 members by 1944, led by Aris Velouchiotis, Samariniotis and Sarafis, and the republican, anti-communist National Republican Greek League (EDES), led by Napoleon Zervas with ~12,000 fighters. EAM/ELAS dominated rural areas, conducting sabotage and guerrilla warfare, while EDES was active in northern Greece. Smaller organizations such as PEAN were active in cities. PEAN's most spectacular act was the bombing of the collaborationist ESPO's headquarters in 1942, who was trying to recruit volunteers for a "Greek Legion" to fight in the Eastern Front alongside Germans. A rare joint operation occurred in November 1942, when ELAS, EDES, and British SOE agents destroyed the Gorgopotamos viaduct in Operation Harling, disrupting Axis supply lines. However, ideological tensions led to ELAS attacking groups like EKKA and clashing with EDES in 1943–44, amid fears of a communist post-war takeover. These conflicts, alongside battles against collaborationist Security Battalions, foreshadowed the Greek Civil War. After the German withdrawal in October 1944, EAM/ELAS's attempt to seize control clashed with British-backed EDES and government forces. This erupted into the Dekemvriana (December 1944–January 1945), a 37-day conflict in Athens where ELAS fought British troops and anti-communist factions, resulting in thousands of deaths and marking the first phase of the Greek civil war, driven by Cold War rivalries and internal divisions.

=== Hungarian ===
Hundreds of Hungarians fought in the Slovak National Uprising notably in the Nógrádi and Petőfi groups (after Petőfi Sándor, Hungarian poet from the Hungarian War of Independence). They also appeared in significant numbers in 20 other units, but unfortunately this did not have an effect on the Kassa declaration (Kassai nyilatkozat). Many activists fought abroad like Kilián György activist and soldier in Poland or Szalvai Mihály politician, who fought in Moscow and Yugoslavia. Many have been martyrs in the French Resistance like Elek Tamás and Botzor József. The Sovereignty movement took over multiple newspapers including the Népszava, the Magyar Nemzet, and the Szabad Szó, to propagate anti-fascist and anti-german sentiment. Their main goal being to break away from the Axis powers. Most of these groups were decentralised, multiple paramilitary groups worked in Budapest in parallel. The most famous of which operated in Angyalföld, under Gidófalvy Lajos, who died a heroic death while trying to prevent the blowing up of the Elizabeth Bridge. They forged papers, protected the Ferdinánd-bridge, took over vehicles, weapons and multiple factories.

=== Italian ===
On 28 October 1922, Benito Mussolini and his fascist paramilitary troops, the Blackshirts, marched on Rome, seized power, and the following day Mussolini became Duce (Prime Minister) of Italy. He thenceforth established a dictatorship centered around his fascist doctrine, and in 1936 Mussolini formed the Axis powers with Nazi Germany. In July 1943, fascist Italy crumbled; Mussolini was turned in by the monarchy and placed under arrest by his government.

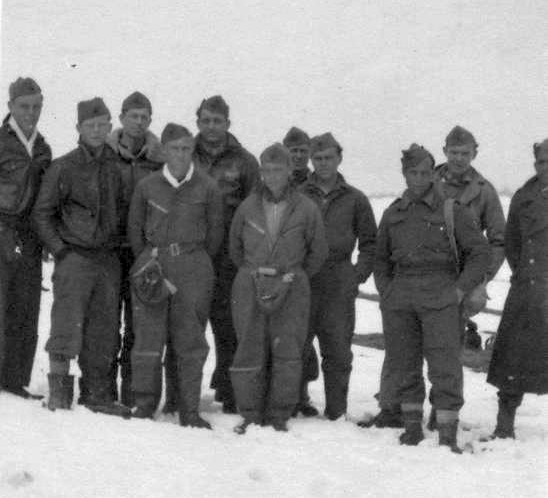
Rescue of Allied airmen by Yugoslav Partisans, Otočac 1943.

On 8 September 1943, when the armistice of Cassibile was announced, Germans invaded Italy and liberated Mussolini, putting him in charge of the Italian Social Republic, a collaborationist regime and puppet state of the Third Reich. Subsequently, the Italian resistance movement, alongside the Italian Co-Belligerent Army, fought the German and Fascist forces.

One of the most important episodes of resistance by Italian armed forces after the armistice was the battle of Piombino, Tuscany. On 10 September 1943, during Operation Achse, a small German flotilla, commanded by Kapitänleutnant Karl-Wolf Albrand, tried to enter the harbor of Piombino but was denied access by the port authorities.

Eventually, after a drawn-out period of combat, the Italian partisans achieved victory. This was assisted by the fall of the Third Reich, which effectively nullified the attacks from German occupation, the ensuing uprising of 25 April 1945 which pushed out all remaining German forces, the fall of Genoa and Milan on April 26, that of Turin two days after. That same day, Mussolini was captured; he was executed on April 28 by Italian partisan Walter Audisio. German forces in Italy officially surrendered on May 2.

=== Lithuanian ===
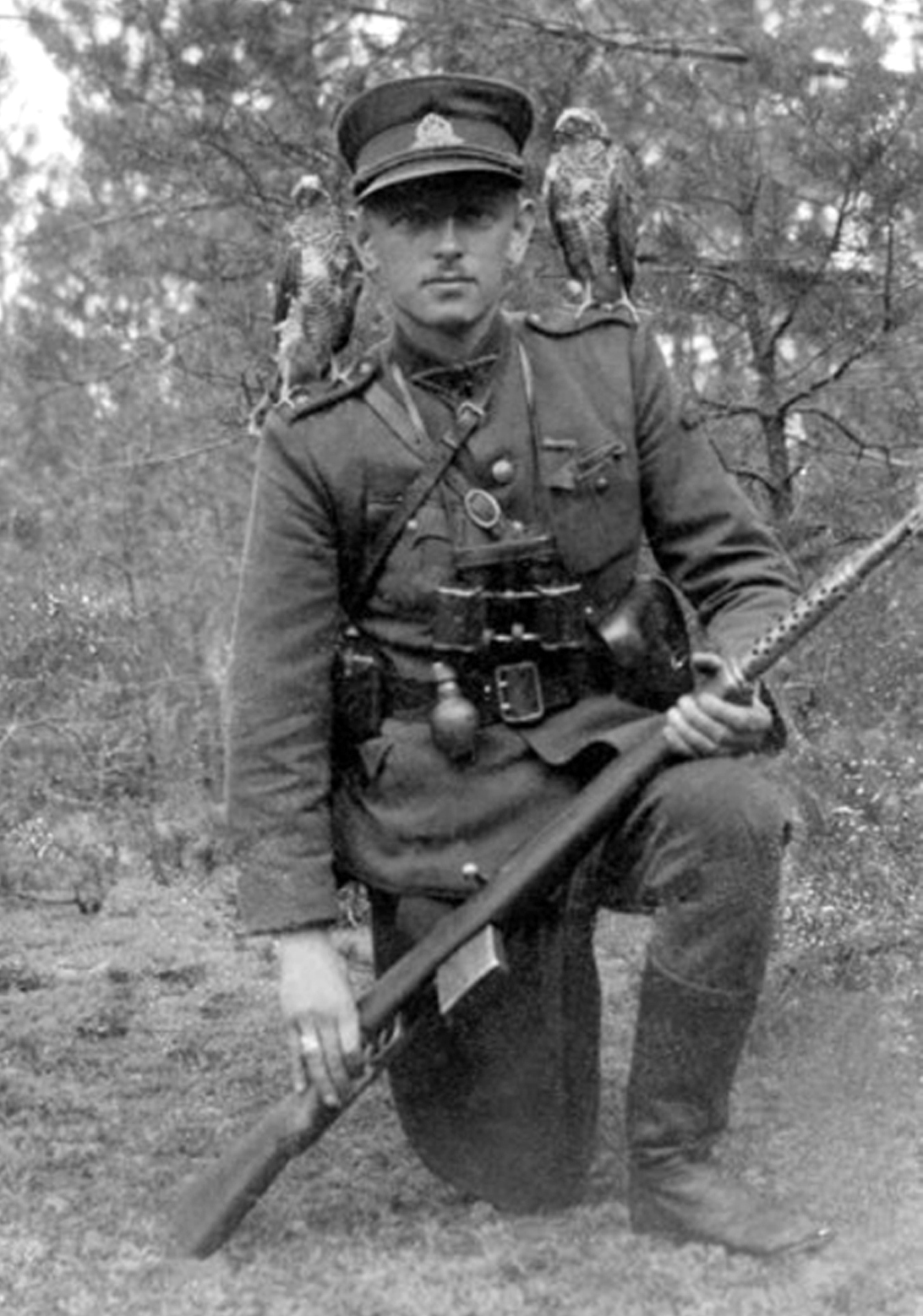
Adolfas Ramanauskas ("Vanagas"), commander of the Union of Lithuanian Freedom Fighters

Among the three Baltic countries, the resistance was best organized in Lithuania, where guerrilla units controlled whole regions of the countryside until 1949. Their armaments included Czech Skoda guns, Russian Maxim heavy machine guns, assorted mortars and a wide variety of mainly German and Soviet light machine guns and submachine guns. When not in direct battles with the Red Army or special NKVD units, they significantly delayed the consolidation of Soviet rule through ambush, sabotage, assassination of local Communist activists and officials, freeing imprisoned guerrillas, and printing underground newspapers.

On 1 July 1944, Lithuanian Liberty Army (LLA) declared a state of war against the Soviet Union and ordered all its able members to mobilize into platoons, stationed in forests and not leave Lithuania. The departments were replaced by two sectors – operational, called Vanagai (Hawks or Falcons; abbreviated VS), and organizational (abbreviated OS). Vanagai, commanded by Albinas Karalius (codename Varenis), were the armed fighters while the organizational sector was tasked with passive resistance, including supply of food, information, and transport to Vanagai. In the middle of 1944, the LLA had 10,000 members. The Soviets killed 659 and arrested 753 members of the LLA by 26 January 1945. Founder Kazys Veverskis was killed in December 1944, the headquarters were liquidated in December 1945. This represented the failure of highly centralized resistance, as the organization was too dependent on Veverskis and other top commanders. In 1946 remaining leaders and fighters of LLA started to merge with Lithuanian partisans. In 1949 all members of presidium of Union of Lithuanian Freedom Fighters - captain Jonas Žemaitis-Tylius, Petras Bartkus-Žadgaila, Bronius Liesys-Naktis ir Juozas Šibaila-Merainis came from LLA.

Supreme Committee for the Liberation of Lithuania (Lithuanian: Vyriausiasis Lietuvos išlaisvinimo komitetas, VLIK), was created on 25 November 1943. VLIK published underground newspapers and agitated for resistance against the Nazis. The Gestapo arrested the most influential members in 1944. After the reoccupation of Lithuania by the Soviets, VLIK moved to the West set its goal to maintain non-recognition of Lithuania's occupation and dissemination of information from behind the Iron Curtain – including the information provided by the Lithuanian partisans.

Former members of the Lithuanian Territorial Defense Force, Lithuanian Liberty Army, Lithuanian Armed Forces, Lithuanian Riflemen's Union formed the basis of Lithuanian partisans. Farmers, Lithuanian officials, students, teachers, and even pupils joined the partisan movement. The movement was actively supported by the society and the Catholic church. It is estimated that by the end of 1945, 30,000 armed people stayed in forests in Lithuania.

The partisans were well-armed. During the 1945-1951 Soviet repressive structures seized from partisans 31 mortars, 2,921 machine guns, 6,304 assault rifles, 22,962 rifles, 8,155 pistols, 15,264 grenades, 2,596 mines, and 3,779,133 cartridges. The partisans usually replenished their arsenal by killing istrebiteli, members of Soviet secret police forces or by purchasing ammunition from Red Army soldiers. Every partisan had binoculars and few grenades. One grenade was usually saved to blow themselves and their faces to avoid being taken as prisoners, since the physical tortures of Soviet MGB/NKVD were very brutal and cruel, and be recognized, to prevent their relatives from suffering.

Captured Lithuanian Forest Brothers themselves often faced torture and summary execution while their relatives faced deportation to Siberia (cf. quotation). Reprisals against anti-Soviet farms and villages were harsh. The NKVD units, named People's Defense Platoons (known by the Lithuanians as pl. stribai, from the Russian: izstrebiteli – destroyers, i.e., the destruction battalions), used shock tactics such as displaying executed partisans' corpses in village courtyards to discourage further resistance.

The report of a commission formed at a KGB prison a few days after the 15 October 1956, arrest of Adolfas Ramanauskas ("Vanagas"), chief commander of the Union of Lithuanian Freedom Fighters, noted the following:

The right eye is covered with haematoma, on the eyelid there are six stab wounds made, judging by their diameter, by a thin wire or nail going deep into the eyeball. Multiple haematomas in the area of the stomach, a cut wound on a finger of the right hand. The genitalia reveal the following: a large tear wound on the right side of the scrotum and a wound on the left side, both testicles and spermatic ducts are missing.

Juozas Lukša was among those who managed to escape to the West; he wrote his memoirs in Paris - Fighters for Freedom. Lithuanian Partisans Versus the U.S.S.R. and was killed after returning to Lithuania in 1951.

Pranas Končius (code name Adomas) was the last Lithuanian anti-Soviet resistance fighter, killed in action by Soviet forces on 6 July 1965 (some sources indicate he shot himself in order to avoid capture on 13 July). He was awarded the Cross of Vytis posthumously in 2000.

Benediktas Mikulis, one of the last known partisans to remain in the forest, emerged in 1971. He was arrested in the 1980s and spent several years in prison.

=== Polish ===
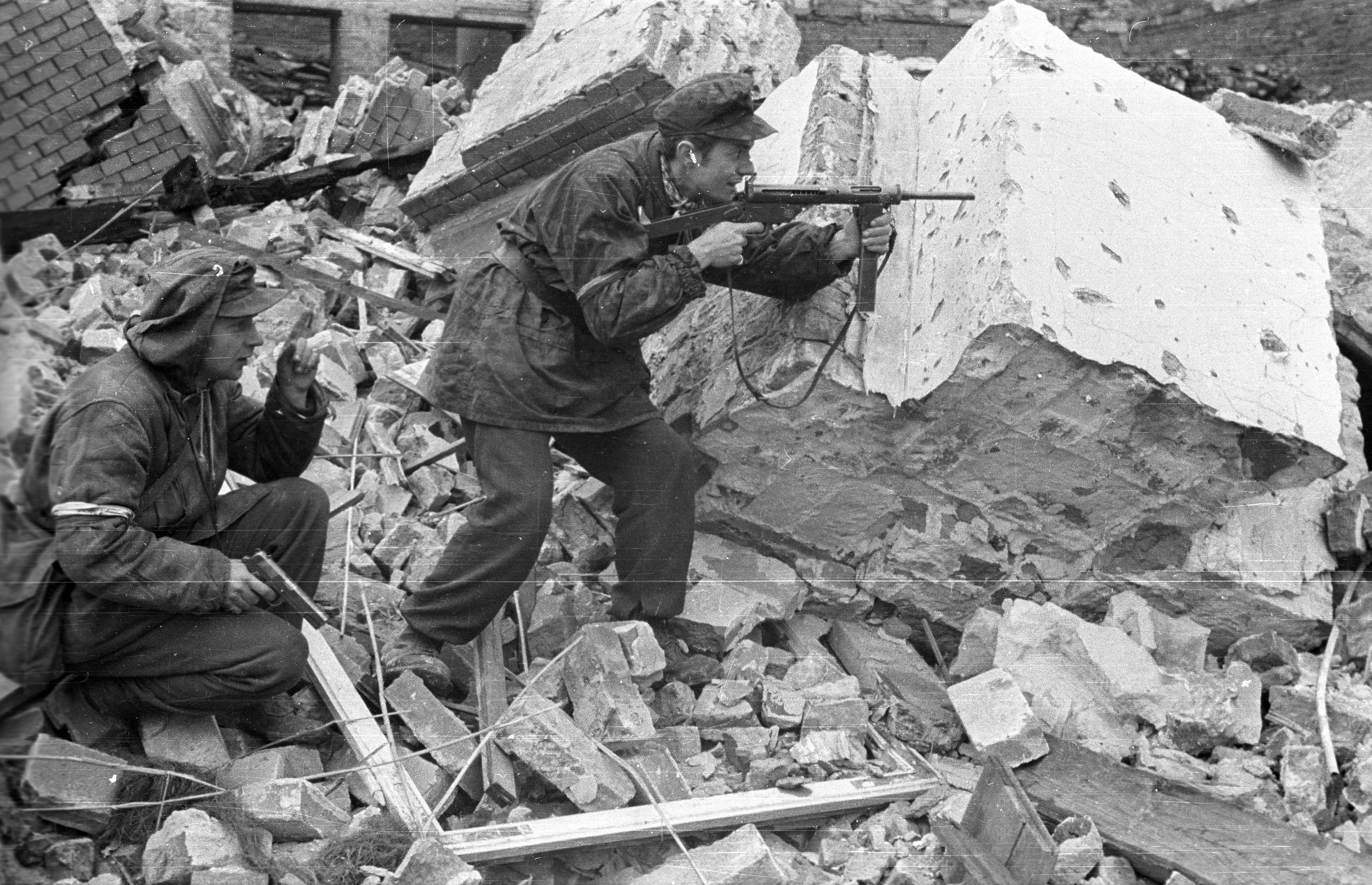
Polish partisans during the Warsaw Uprising in 1944.

The order to organize partisan groups was issued by the Marshal of Poland Rydz-Śmigły on 16 September 1939. The first sabotage groups were created in Warsaw on 18 September 1939. Each battalion was to choose 3 soldiers who were to sabotage the enemy's war effort behind the front lines. The sabotage groups were organized before Rydz-Śmigły's order was received.

Independently, the Separated Unit of the Polish Army created in late 1939 in Poland is often recognized as the first partisan unit of World War II.

The situation amongst the Polish partisans and the situation of the Polish partisans were both complicated. The founding organizations that led to the creation of the Home Army or Armia Krajowa, also known as AK, were themselves organized in 1939. Home Army was the largest Polish partisan organization; moreover, organizations such as peasant Bataliony Chłopskie, created primarily for self—defense against the Nazi German abuse, or the armed wing of the Polish Socialist Party and most of the nationalist National Armed Forces did subordinate themselves, before the end of the World War II, to the very Home Army. The communist Gwardia Ludowa remained indifferent and even hostile towards the Home Army, and of two Jewish organizations, the Jewish Military Union did cooperate with the Home Army, when the leftist and pro-Soviet Jewish Combat Organization did not.

Both Jewish combat organizations staged the Ghetto uprising in 1943. Armia Krajowa staged Warsaw Uprising in 1944, amongst other activities. Bataliony Chłopskie fought mainly in Zamość Uprising.

The Polish partisans faced many enemies. The main enemies were the Nazi Germans, Ukrainian nationalists, Lithuanian Nazi collaborators, and even the Soviets. In spite of the ideological enmity, the Home Army did launch a massive sabotage campaign after the Germans began Operation Barbarossa. Amongst other acts of sabotage, the Polish partisans damaged nearly 7,000 locomotives, over 19,000 railway cars, over 4,000 German military vehicles and built-in faults into 92,000 artillery projectiles as well as 4710 built-in faults into aircraft engines, just to mention a few and just in between 1941 and 1944.

In Ukraine and southeastern Poland, the Poles fought against the Ukrainian nationalists and UPA (Ukrainian Insurgent Army) to protect the ethnic Poles from mass murder visited upon them during the massacres of Poles in Volhynia and Eastern Galicia. They were aided, until after the war was over, by the Soviet partisans. At least 60,000 Poles lost their lives, the majority of them civilians, men, women, and children. Some of the victims were Poles of Jewish descent who had escaped from the ghetto or death camp. The majority of the Polish partisans in Ukraine assisted the invading Soviet Army. Few of them were mistreated or killed by the Soviets or the Polish communists.

In Lithuania and Belarus, after a period of initial cooperation, the Poles defended themselves against the Soviet partisans as well as fought against the Lithuanian Nazi collaborators. The Poles failed to defeat the Soviet Partisans, but did achieve a decisive victory against the Lithuanian Nazi collaborators, Battle of Murowana Oszmianka. Afterwards, about half of the Polish partisans in Lithuania assisted the invading Soviet Army, and many ended up mistreated and even killed by the Soviets and the Polish communists.

=== Soviet ===
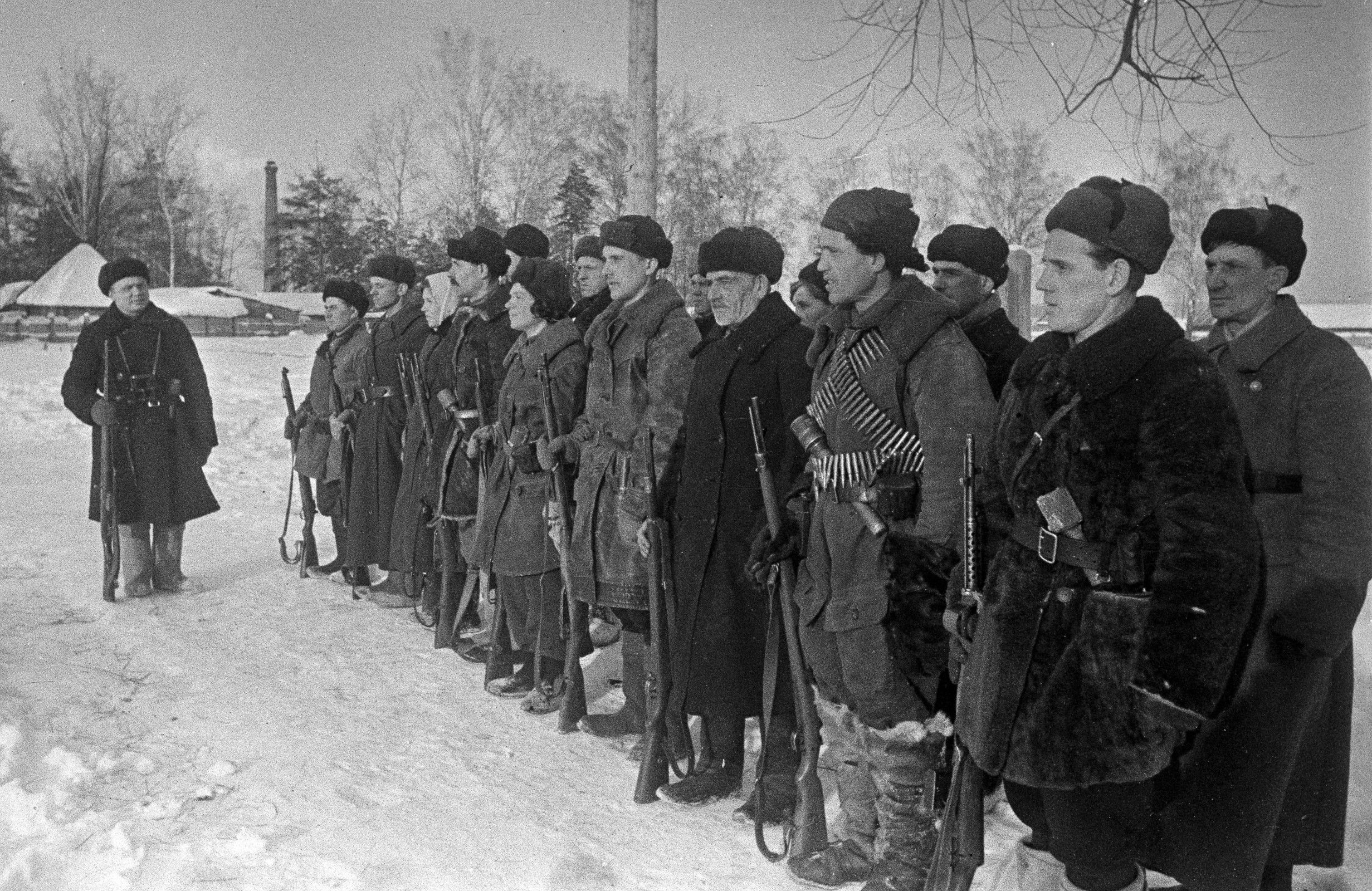
Soviet partisans in Solnechnogorsky District (Moscow Oblast), November 1941.

Soviet partisans during World War II, especially those active in Belarus, effectively harassed German troops and significantly hampered their operations in the region. As a result, Soviet authority was re-established deep inside the German-held territories. In some areas partisan collective farms raised crops and livestock to produce food. However this was not usually the case and partisans also requisitioned supplies from the local populace, sometimes involuntarily.

According to many accounts, Soviet partisans in Finland, were less coordinated and controlled by the Soviet government, and known to have attacked villages and indiscriminately targeted the populace, killing entire families. The war crimes committed in Finland by Soviet partisans were investigated by the National Bureau since 1999. However, Russia refused access to Soviet archives and the investigation ended in 2003. Partisan warfare was routinely distorted in the Soviet Union. According to historian Veikko Erkkilä the Russian attitude towards civilian atrocities has been marred by the Great Patriotic War propaganda. In East Karelia, most partisans attacked Finnish military supply and communication targets, but inside Finland proper, almost two-thirds of the attacks targeted civilians, killing 200 and injuring 50, mostly women, children and elderly.

=== Ukrainian ===
The Ukrainian Insurgent Army (Ukrainian: Українська Повстанська Армія (УПА), Ukrayins'ka Povstans'ka Armiya; UPA) was a Ukrainian nationalist paramilitary and later partisan army that engaged in a series of guerrilla conflicts during World War II in concert with Nazi Germany against the Soviet Union, Czechoslovakia, and both Underground and Communist Poland. The group was the military wing of the Organization of Ukrainian Nationalists—Bandera faction (the OUN-B), originally formed in Volyn in the spring and summer of 1943. Its official date of creation is 14 October 1942, day of Intercession of the Theotokos feast.

The OUN's stated immediate goal was the re-establishment of a united, independent national state on Ukrainian ethnic territory. Violence was accepted as a political tool against foreign as well as domestic enemies of their cause, which was to be achieved by a national revolution led by a dictatorship that would drive out the occupying powers and set up a government representing all regions and social groups. The organization began as a resistance group and developed into a guerrilla army.

During its existence, the Ukrainian Insurgent Army fought against the Poles and the Soviets as their primary opponents, although the organization also rarely fought against the Germans starting in February 1943. From late spring 1944, the UPA and Organization of Ukrainian Nationalists-B (OUN-B)—faced with Soviet advances—also cooperated in many instances with German forces and Soviet forces against the invading Germans, Soviets, and Poles in the hope of creating an independent Fascist Ukrainian state. The UPA committed ethnic cleansing of the Polish population of Volhynia and East Galicia.

=== Yugoslav ===
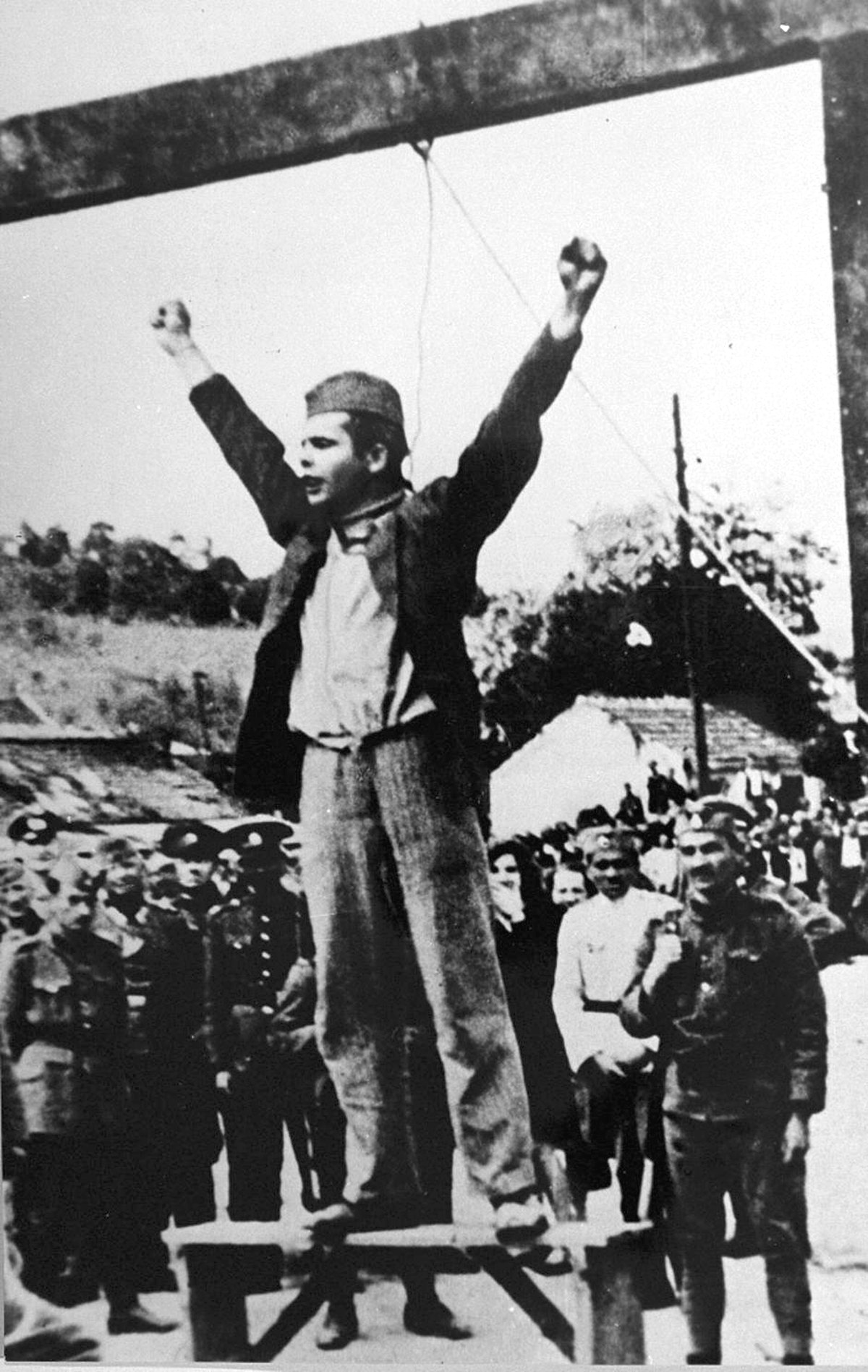
Yugoslav partisan Stjepan Filipović shouting "Death to fascism, freedom to the people!" moments before his execution in German-occupied Valjevo

The Yugoslav Partisans or the National Liberation Army (officially the National Liberation Army and Partisan Detachments of Yugoslavia), was Europe's most effective anti-Nazi resistance movement. It was led by the Communist Party of Yugoslavia during World War II. Its commander was Marshal Josip Broz Tito. They were a leading force in the liberation of their country during the People's Liberation War of Yugoslavia.

By the middle of 1943 partisan resistance to the Germans and their allies had grown from the dimensions of a mere nuisance to those of a major factor in the general situation. In many parts of occupied Europe, the enemy was suffering losses at the hands of partisans that he could ill afford. Nowhere were these losses heavier than in Yugoslavia.

— Basil Davidson

By late 1944, the total forces of the Partisans numbered 650,000 men and women organized in four field armies and 52 divisions, which engaged in conventional warfare. By April 1945, the Partisans numbered over 800,000.

Shortly before the end of the war, in March 1945, all resistance forces were reorganized into the regular armed force of Yugoslavia and renamed the Yugoslav Army. It would keep this name until 1951, when it was renamed Yugoslav People's Army.

Postwar Yugoslavia was one of only two European countries that were largely liberated by its own forces during World War II. It received significant assistance from the Soviet Union during the liberation of Serbia, and substantial assistance from the Balkan Air Force from mid-1944, but only limited assistance, mainly from the British, prior to 1944. At the end of the war, no foreign troops were stationed on its soil. Partly as a result, the country found itself halfway between the two camps at the onset of the Cold War.

=== Belarusian and Russian ===
Partisan movements have emerged in Russia and Belarus after the beginning of the Russian invasion of Ukraine.

== Notable partisan groups and battles ==
- 2022–2023 Belarusian and Russian partisan movement
- Albanian Partisans
- Afghan Mujahideen
- Armenian irregular units
- Armia Krajowa
- Armia Ludowa
- Bataliony Chłopskie
- Bulgarian resistance movement during World War II
- Bushwhackers
- Caucasian Front (Chechen War)
- Cursed soldiers
- Czechoslovak resistance
- Danish resistance movement
- Dutch Resistance
- FARC (Revolutionary Armed Forces of Colombia)
- Forest Brothers
- Francs-Tireurs et Partisans
- Free France
- French Resistance
- Front de libération du Québec
- Greek Resistance
- Green Guard
- Italian resistance movement
- Irish Republican Brotherhood
- Jewish partisans
- Jewish Combat Organization
- Kuperjanov Infantry Battalion
- Kurdish Partisans
- Kuva-yi Milliye
- Lithuanian partisans
- Macedonian partisans
- Mosby's Rangers
- National Armed Forces
- Norwegian resistance movement
- Operation Anthropoid
- Partisans Armés, a faction of the resistance in German-occupied Belgium in World War II.
- Partisan Ranger Act
- Peace Companies
- Pomeranian Griffin
- Polish resistance movement in World War II
- Romanian anti-communist resistance movement
- Slovak National Uprising
- Soviet partisans
- Spanish Maquis
- Tibetan Defenders of the Faith Volunteer Army
- Ukrainian Insurgent Army
- Ukrainian resistance during the Russian invasion of Ukraine
- Viet Cong
- Yugoslav Partisans
- Russian Liberation Army

== See also ==
- Asymmetric warfare
- Fifth column
- Guerrilla warfare
- Improvised explosive device
- List of guerrillas
- Unconventional warfare
