= Alfonsas Smetona =

Commander of the anti-Soviet Lithuanian partisans

Colonel Alfonsas Smetona

Commander of the Vytis military district
- In office 13 May 1948 – 5 July 1950
- Preceded by: Danielius Vaitelis
- Succeeded by: Mykolas Šemežys

Personal details
- Born: 15 September 1913 Justinava, Kovno Governorate, Russian Empire
- Died: 5 July 1950 (aged 36) Girelė forest, Panevėžys district, Lithuanian SSR
- Relatives: Antanas Smetona
- Occupation: Lithuanian partisan

Military service
- Years of service: 1944–1950 (Lithuanian partisans)

Alfonsas Smetona, also known by the codenames Ramūnas and Žygaudas (15 September 1913 – 5 July 1950) was an anti-Soviet Lithuanian partisan and commander of the Vytis military district.

== Biography ==
=== Early life ===
Alfonsas Smetona was born on 15 September 1913 in Justinava to Baltramiejus Smetona and Marijona Dirsytė née Smetonienė. Baltramiejus Smetona was a half-brother to the Lithuanian president Antanas Smetona. Smetona attended primary school in Šilai. Later he attended middle school in Ramygala and an agriculture academy at Dotnuva. After graduating from another middle school in Krakės, Smetona served in the Lithuanian Army. Smetona was an active member of the Lithuanian Riflemen's Union, creating and heading the Vadokliai riflemen squad. He also established the city's Young Farmer Circle. From 1939 to 1940, Smetona worked as a policeman in Ramygala.

=== Occupation ===
When the Soviet Union occupied Lithuania in 1940, Smetona established the Lithuanian Activist Front in Šilai. During Operation Barbarossa in 1941, Smetona organized the Lithuanian Liberation Organization (Lietuvos išsilaisvinimo organizacija). The organization shot five members of the Komsomol who allegedly planned to kill the priest of the Šilai parish. During the June Uprising, Smetona headed a rebel group in the city. During the German occupation of Lithuania, Smetona served in the German police in Ramygala, and later at Smarhon in Belarus. Later, he joined the Lithuanian Liberty Army.

=== Partisan ===
Smetona became a partisan in 1944 during the retreat of the German army. He headed small groups of partisans, for which his family experienced repressions by Soviet authorities. Smetona participated in a battle in Lėnas on 12 January 1945, where the leader of the Vytis military district, Juozas Krikštaponis, was killed. Krikštaponis was succeeded by Danielius Vaitelis, under whom Smetona served as adjutant. After the death of Vaitelis on 13 May 1948, Smetona succeeded him as leader of the military district.

Smetona divided the military district into four smaller districts, establishing two partisan detachments named Krikštaponis and Vaitelis. A new partisan headquarters was established in the forest of Šilai. An underground newspaper entitled Lietuva brangi was published, and Smetona organized a web of distributors of press by the Union of Lithuanian Freedom Fighters. The partisan headquarters also published a call for people not to join collective farms and the Komsomol. Smetona established an underground union that lived legally and supplied the partisans with food protection. Additionally, Smetona prepared a statute for the military district.

After his bunker was revealed and then surrounded by Soviet forces, Smetona killed himself with a grenade in the ensuing fight on 5 July 1950.

== Remembrance ==
In 1999, Smetona was awarded the Commander's Cross of the Order of the Lithuanian Grand Duke Gediminas and the rank of colonel. A memorial cross was also built at his death site.
