= Daugėliškis =

Daugėliškis (Polish name: Daugieliszki; Russian name variants: Daugelishki, Davgelishki, Dovgelishki) may refer to the following places in Lithuania:

- Naujasis Daugėliškis (New Daugėliškis), Ignalina District Municipality
- Senasis Daugėliškis (Old Daugėliškis), Ignalina District Municipality
- Daugėliškis, Kėdainiai, village in Truskava Eldership, Kėdainiai District Municipality
- Daugėliškis, Panevėžys, village in Krekenava Eldership, Panevėžys District Municipality
- Daugėliškis, Ukmergė, village in Pivonija Eldership, Ukmergė District Municipality
