= Varžos =

- Street village
- Location of Varžos
- Coordinates: 55°19′33.6″N 24°41′34.8″E
- Country: Lithuania
- Ethnographic region: Aukštaitija
- Municipality: Ukmergė District Municipality
- Eldership: Pivonija Eldership

Population (2021)
  - Total: 5
- Time zone: UTC+2 (EET)

Varžos is a street village in the Ukmergė district of Lithuania. It is situated 9 kilometers northwest of Ukmergė near the Užulėnis forest. As of 2021, the village has a population of 5 people.

The village is home to an ethnographic homestead that is included in the country's Registry of Cultural Property (RCP). It was built more than 100 years ago and is typical of the Eastern Aukštaitija region. In 2001, a cross dedicated to Lithuanian partisans of the Vytis military district was built; a squad headed by Stasys Žeruolis (codename Ąžuolas) was liquidated in this village on 3 May 1945, possibly due to a betrayal. On 10 April 1946, an engagement between a partisan squad headed by Juozas Survila (codename Šarūnas) and the NKVD occurred.

== Etymology ==
The name of Varžos originally comes from the word "varža" (a device for catching fish, a hook).

== Notable people ==
Apolonija Grigonytė, a locally recognized teacher and member of the Independent Writers' Union, was born in Varžos.
