= Jonas Žeruolis =

Lithuanian civil lawyer (1907–1986)

Jonas Žeruolis (25 March 1907 – 18 January 1986) was a Lithuanian civil lawyer. Žeruolis headed the codification of the Lithuanian SSR's civil law. He was awarded the title of Honored Lawyer of the Lithuanian SSR in 1965, and Honored Scientist of the Lithuanian SSR in 1977. In addition to co-authoring some books on civil law, Žeruolis wrote textbooks for high school students. Žeruolis argued that the court process is determined by the materialist nature of the law.

== Biography ==
=== Early life ===
Jonas Žeruolis was born on 25 March 1907 in Riga (then within the Russian Empire) to a family of a railroad worker. During the First World War, the family evacuated to Oryol. After the death of his father in 1919, Žeruolis spent two years in an orphan shelter. After returning to Lithuania in 1921, the future lawyer worked at his grandfather's farm and simultaneously attended school in Ukmergė. He graduated in 1926. Žeruolis then enrolled in the Faculty of Law of Vytautas Magnus University, at the same time working in Kaunas as a clerk. He graduated and became a certified lawyer in 1934. From 15 March 1935 to 1937 Žeruolis was a candidate for the judiciary in Kaunas. In 1937 he became active in the underground communist Lithuanian Red Aid organisation. From 1 May 1937 to 1939 Žeruolis was a court investigator in Ukmergė, and then a court judge in Vilnius from 1 January 1940.

=== Second World War ===
After the Soviet occupation of Lithuania in 1940, the People's Government of Lithuania made Žeruolis the prosecutor of the Šiauliai district. Eventually, Žeruolis became a member of the Supreme Court of the Lithuanian SSR, a position he held until the German invasion of the Soviet Union in 1941. During Operation Barbarossa, Žeruolis was in hiding, only getting permission to privately practice law at the end of 1941. Žeruolis practiced law in Vilnius for the duration of the Second World War. It is known that he was a member of the anti-German National Front (Tautinis frontas) headed by Juozas Krikštaponis as well as an organisation responsible for material aid for people whose families suffered due to the Nazi invasion. Žeruolis then joined Juozas Vitas's Union for the Liberation of Lithuania. After it was destroyed in 1943, Žeruolis was arrested and jailed. Nevertheless, due to a lack of evidence against him, Žeruolis was soon released. Despite his arrest, Žeruolis continued his involvement in anti-German movements; he joined the Soviet partisans (Adam Mickiewicz Squad headed by Stanislovas Juozapavičius) and participated in the re-occupation of Vilnius. After the majority of Lithuania was re-occupied, Žeruolis again worked for the Lithuanian SSR's Supreme Court. In 1944 Žeruolis began working at the Faculty of Law at Vincas Kapsukas State University of Vilnius, specializing as an arbiter and lecturing on Roman civil law.

=== Soviet occupation ===
From December 1947 to December 1949 Žeruolis acted as the 9th chairman of the Lithuanian SSR's college of its presidium of lawyers. Žeruolis became the head of the faculty's civil law department in 1948. In 1958 Žeruolis joined the Communist Party of the Soviet Union. After defending his dissertation in 1959, Žeruolis became the faculty's dean that same year. In 1961 he was made an associate professor. In 1961—1968 and 1969—1983 Žeruolis was the editor-in-chief of the law magazine Teisė. Apart from his legal work, Žeruolis was a part-time lecturer at the Central Committee of the Communist Party of Lithuania. In 1970, he became the party's member responsible for scientific work. That same year, Žeruolis defended his dissertation on Soviet civil law in Leningrad State University, gaining a doctoral degree. He became a professor in 1971.

Žeruolis died on 18 January 1986 in Vilnius.
