= Juozas Survila =

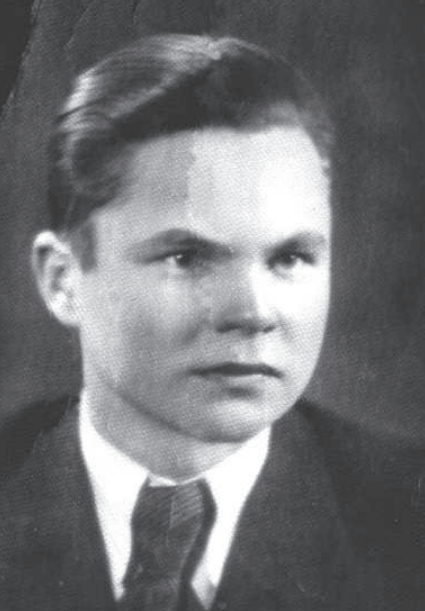
- Nickname: Šarūnas
- Born: 27 April 1921 Gružos, Ukmergė district, Lithuania
- Died: 9 March 1947 (aged 25) Baravykai, Lithuanian SSR
- Allegiance: Lithuanian partisans

Juozas Survila, also known by the codename Šarūnas (27 April 1921 – 9 March 1947) was a Lithuanian anti-Soviet partisan who served as the second-in-command of Danielius Vaitelis, the commander of the Vytis military district.

== Biography ==
Juozas Survila was born on 27 April 1921 in the village of Gružos in the present-day Ukmergė District Municipality to a family of affluent farmers. Survila is said to have graduated from a vocational school and studied at a technical school. On 16 February 1944, he became a cadet of the Lithuanian Territorial Defense Force's war school in Marijampolė. After the school was closed down by German authorities on 15 May, Survila returned to his home village. Survila went into hiding to the Gružos forest along with his brother Vincas and other neighbours in the autumn. In November 1944, Survila joined the partisan squad of Petras Žeruolis (a former viršila who organized resistance in the forest with his brother). The squad was composed of residents of nearby villages and farmsteads. Survila's brother Vincas died in a battle with the NKVD on 2 November 1944.

Upon the creation of the Vytis military district in December 1944, Survila became part of the district's main headquarters. In April 1945, Survila was appointed as the head of a partisan squad comprising around 60 men. According to NKVD reports, Survila's squad was one of the most active squads under the command of Danielius Vaitelis. In February 1946, Survila became the deputy of Vaitelis. In April 1946, Survila and Vaitelis formed a new partisan group around Deltuva. Survila's squad engaged the NKVD on 10 April 1946 in the village of Varžos. In September 1946, the squad attacked the town of Siesikai, burning down an NKVD building and killing a few Soviet activists. Survila is also known to have had ties with the priest Alfonsas Svarinskas since 1945.

Survila died on 9 March 1947 in the village of Baravykai during an engagement with the MGB. His remains were desecrated in Šalnos and Taujėnai. It is believed that he is buried near Siesikai.

== Remembrance ==
Survila was recognised as a soldier-volunteer and awarded the rank of senior non-commissioned officer in 2005.
