= Church of St. Stephen, Vilnius =

Church in Vilnius, Lithuania

Church of St. Stephen Šv. diakono Stepono bažnyčia
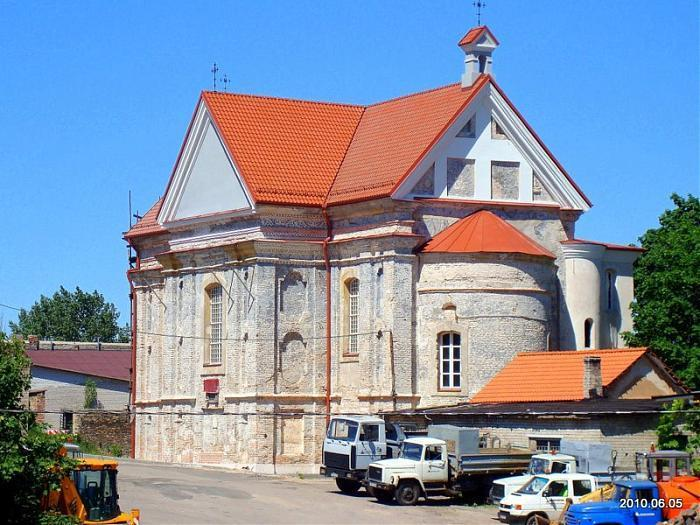
- Façade of St. Stephen's with partly completed reconstruction in 2010

Religion
- Affiliation: Roman Catholic
- District: Naujamiestis

Location
- Location: Vilnius, Lithuania
- Interactive map of Church of St. Stephen; Šv. diakono Stepono bažnyčia
- Coordinates: 54°40′10″N 25°16′35″E

Architecture
- Architect: Pietro de Rossi
- Type: Church
- Style: Renaissance
- Completed: 1600
- Materials: plastered masonry

Church of St. Stephen (Lithuanian: Vilniaus Šv. diakono Stepono bažnyčia, Polish: Kościół św. Szczepana w Wilnie) is a former Roman Catholic church in Naujamiestis, Vilnius. It was completed in 1600 and previously was used by the Brotherhood of Saint Roch. Today, it stands in a warehouse yard and used as a theatre. It was restored from a very poor condition.

== History ==
St Stephen's church was constructed in 1600 by Father Simonas Visockis of the Jesuits who collected money from the local townspeople to pay for its construction. It was constructed alongside the wooden St Lazarus' Hospital. In 1604, it was the centre of the celebrations of the canonisation of St Casimir. The celebrations are repeated yearly with a parade from Vilnius Cathedral through Vilnius Old Town to St Stephen's church, carrying a replica of the papal labarum that affirmed his canonisation.

By 1612, the hospital and church were rebuilt. In 1655, it was involved in a fire that destroyed the hospital. In 1715, the Bishop of Vilnius handed the church over to the ownership of the Brotherhood of Saint Roch. In 1752, the church was given to the Mariavites, whom were granted permission by Pope Clement XII to incorporate St Stephen's as a part of a new monastery site. In 1864, the Emperor of Russia Tsar Alexander II passed a decree ordering that the monastery be closed. The Russian state then took over St Stephen's and made it into the chapel of a new prison. During the Soviet Union, the church was made into a stonemasonry but it was damaged during the Second World War and then made into a warehouse before being transformed into a theatre.

== Design ==
St Stephen's Church is the only Renaissance church in Vilnius with sgraffito plasterwork. In 2015, the Lithuanian Department of Cultural Heritage and the Roman Catholic Church restored the church to preserve the sgraffito. The Department contributed €36,322 with the Archdiocese of Vilnius contributing €14,481.
