= Pietro de Rossi =

Italian architect

- Born: c. 1760; Rome, Papal States
- Died: 1831
- Occupation: Architect

Pietro de Rossi (c. 1760 – 1831) was an Italian architect. He is best known for his projects of the Neoclassical architecture style in the Grand Duchy of Lithuania in the late 18th century and early 19th century.

== Projects ==
Architectural projects to which Rossi contributed:

- Pažaislis Monastery in Kaunas, 1791–1792
- A house at 41-9 Vilniaus Street in Vilnius, 1796
- Vilnius Town Hall, 1799
- Chapel-mausoleum of Natalia Repnina at Vingis Park, 1799–1800
- Church of St. Stephen in Vilnius, 1801–1806
- Taujėnai Manor, 1802
- Slushko Palace in Vilnius, 1803
- Bell tower of the Church of the Most Holy Trinity in Troškūnai, 1803
- Salos Manor, early 19th century
- Vilnius Cathedral, early 19th century.
