= Taujėnai Manor =

- Taujėnų dvaras (Lithuanian)
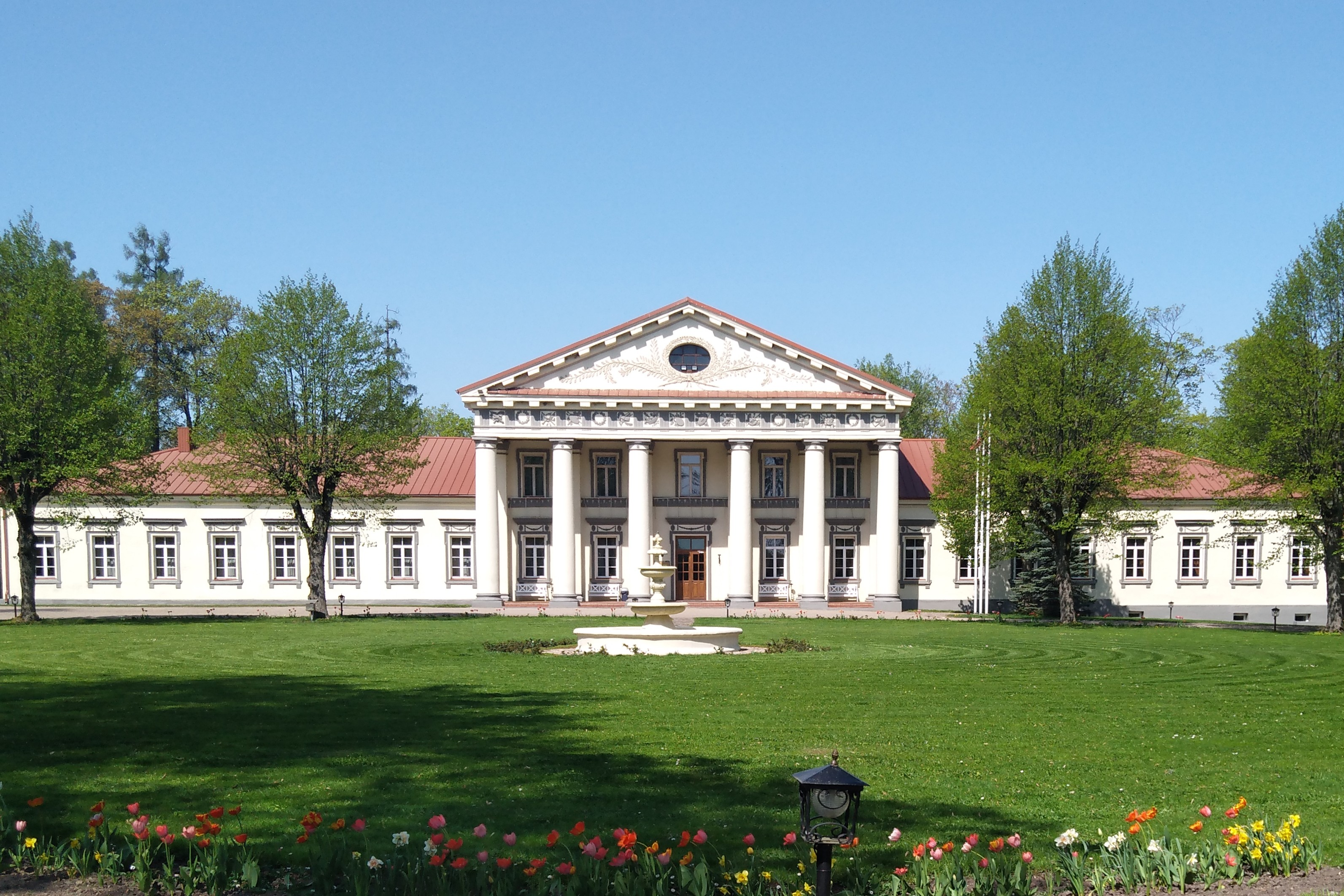
- Taujėnai Manor in 2018

- Location within Lithuania
- Interactive map of Taujėnai Manor
- 55°23′50″N 24°45′38″E
- Type: Residential manor
- Location: Taujėnai, Lithuania

History
- Built: 1785
- Built for: Benediktas Morikonis

Site notes
- Architect: Pietro de Rossi
- Architectural style: Classical Revival
- Website: taujenudvaras.lt

Taujėnai Manor (Lithuanian: Taujėnų dvaras, Polish: Dwór w Towianach) is a historic manor complex located in Taujėnai, Ukmergė district, Lithuania. Established in the late 16th century, it features a Neoclassical manor house and an English-style garden. Today, the manor operates as a hotel and a restaurant.

== Architecture ==
The manor’s neoclassical palace features a six-column Tuscan order portico, symmetrical façade, and decorative bas-reliefs. The original interiors, once adorned with family portraits, hunting trophies, and a grand library, were largely destroyed during World War II. Surviving elements include the cellar and fragments of 18th-century foundations uncovered in 2012 archaeological surveys. The Taujėnai Manor building was once reputed to be of exceptional length, with a recorded measurement of 150 metres, which led to its recognition as the longest manor in Lithuania. In the present day, only five of the original seven wings remain.

Surrounding the palace is a 25-hectare English-style landscape park, designed by Pietro de Rossi. It includes old oak trees, cascading ponds, and restored walking paths. The park also houses a mini-zoo.

== History ==
=== Early history ===
Taujėnai Manor was first documented in 1595 as a wooden estate owned by various Lithuanian noble families, including the Nonhart, Eperješ, Massalskis, and Radziwiłłs. Its golden age began in the late 18th century when Count Benedykt Morykoni acquired the estate through marriage to Maria Radziwiłł as her dowry. Morykoni commissioned Italian architect Pietro de Rossi to design a Classical Revival palace in 1785, replacing the original wooden structure. The manor became a summer residence for the Radziwiłł family and hosted notable figures, including Russian Emperor Alexander I, who visited in 1812 and 1814. After the death of Morykoni, the manor returned to the Radziwiłł family.

=== 20th century ===
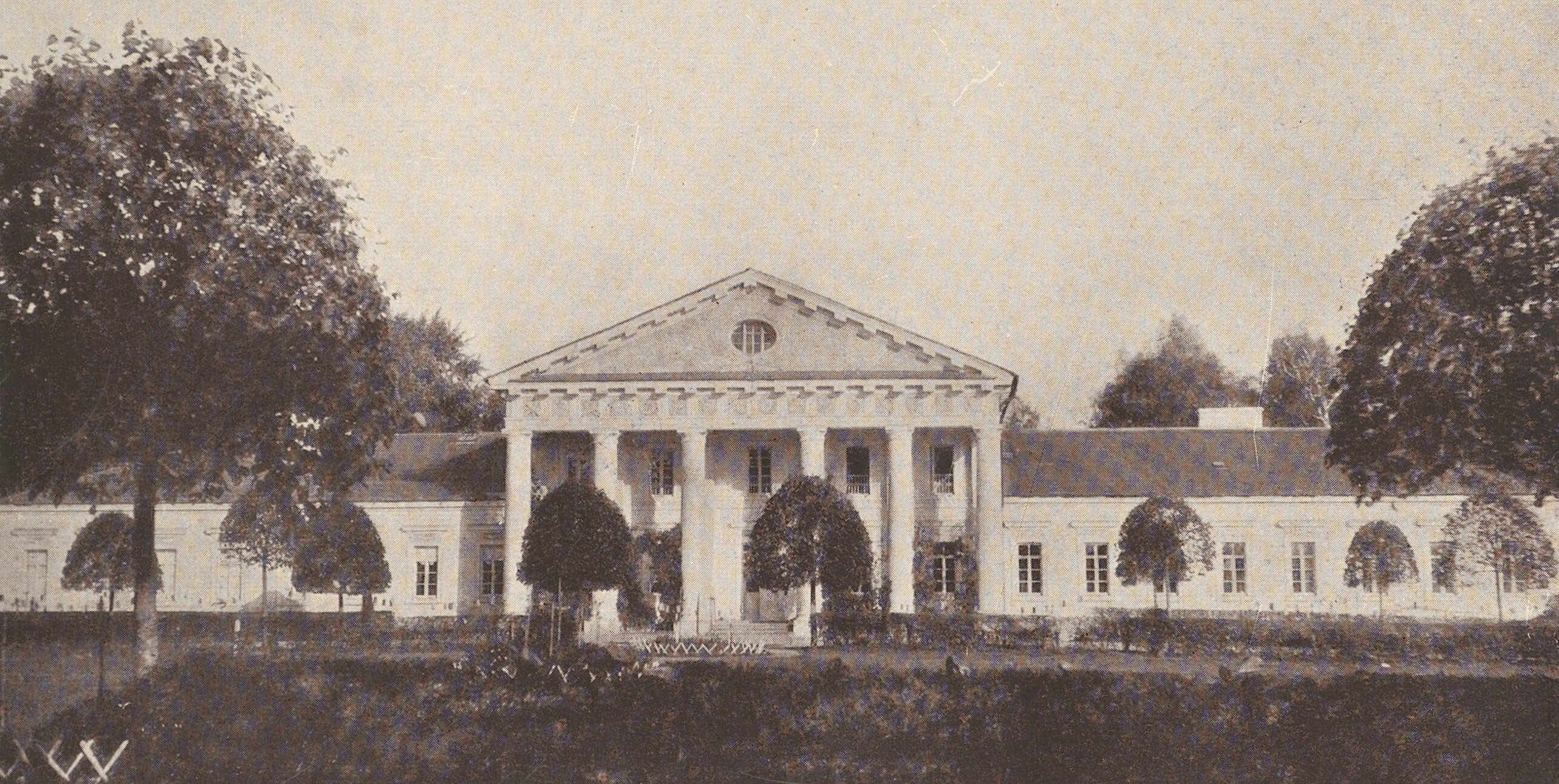
Taujėnai Manor in 1911

In the early 20th century, the estate passed to Count Konstanty Radziwiłł, who expanded its agricultural operations to 9,000 hectares. However, post-World War I Lithuanian land reforms reduced its holdings to 80 hectares, leading to financial struggles for Radziwiłł. During that time the manor was frequently visited by President Antanas Smetona, who owned the nearby Užugiris Manor. Eventually, the Taujėnai manor was foreclosed by Žemės bankas and in 1940, the manor was sold at auction.

Following the Soviet occupation of Lithuania and during World War II, Radziwiłł was arrested by the NKVD and imprisoned in Kaunas Hard Labour Prison on charges of involvement in the establishment of the Lithuanian army. In 1941, Radziwiłł was forcefully deported to Siberia for five years, a sentence that became increasingly unbearable for the elderly and frail count. He died around 1945.

During the war, Taujėnai manor was severely damaged by Soviet Red Army and German Wehrmacht, and its interiors were looted and vandalized. The Soviet era saw it repurposed for administrative and agricultural use, including a collective farm office. However, the new Soviet government wasn't interested in repairing the damage the manor had sustained during the war, as the Soviet authorities had initially intended to demolish the manor, but scrapped those plans after public outcry.

After Lithuania regained independence, the manor was acquired by brothers Ričardas and Kęstutis Stackevičius in 1995, who initiated extensive restoration on their private funds. The restoration of the Manor House was partly based on a project by architect Vytautas Landsbergis-Žemkalnis made in 1973.
