= Juozas Vitas =

Lithuanian communist

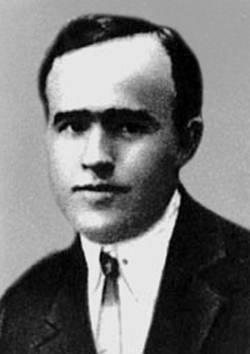
- Born: Juozas Valūnas; 8 January 1899; Dzūnija, Russian Empire
- Died: 1943 (aged 43–44); Generalbezirk Litauen
- Cause of death: Executed by the Gestapo
- Education: Communist University of the National Minorities of the West
- Occupations: Communist activists, member of anti-Nazi resistance
- Awards: Order of the Cross of Grunwald; Hero of the Soviet Union

Juozas Vitas (real name Juozas Valūnas; 8 January 1899 – 1943) was a Lithuanian communist. In 1942–1943, he organized the anti-German resistance group, Union for the Liberation of Lithuania (Lithuanian: Lietuvos išlaisvinimo sąjunga), and established contacts with Polish and Jewish underground. These activities were detected by the Gestapo and Vitas was executed. He was recognized as Hero of the Soviet Union in 1965. He was the seventh and last Lithuanian to receive Hero of the Soviet Union for anti-German resistance.

== Biography ==
=== World War I ===
Vitas was born in the Dzūnija village, Alytus District, Russian Empire. During World War I, he was drafted to the Russian Imperial Army and became a member of the Russian Communist Party (bolsheviks) in 1919. He returned to Lithuania and conducted counter-intelligence during the Lithuanian Wars of Independence. In March 1920, he was drafted to the Lithuanian Army and continued communist agitation among the soldiers of the 7th Infantry Regiment. He was arrested and sentenced to death, but a group of soldiers freed him.

=== Interwar ===
In August 1921, Vitas escaped to Moscow where he graduated from the Communist University of the National Minorities of the West in 1925 and the Moscow Evening Machine Building Institute in 1932. He worked in Tula (1925–1928), as an engineer in Dzerzhinsk (1932–1935), and as a director of an engineering school in Leningrad (1935–1940).

=== World War II ===
After the Soviet occupation of Lithuania in June 1940, he returned to Lithuania and became the chairman of the executive committee of Vilnius. When Germany invaded the Soviet Union in June 1941, Vitas – unlike many other communists – remained in Lithuania and began organizing anti-German resistance. It is believed that he acted without assistance from NKVD or the Communist Party of Lithuania. Vitas established contacts with Lithuanian intelligentsia and various small anti-German groups in Vilnius, Šiauliai, Panevėžys, Kaunas. His contacts included Ona Šimaitė, Vytautas Landsbergis-Žemkalnis, Bishop Mečislovas Reinys.

On 24 February 1943, he co-founded the Anti-Fascist Committee, which was renamed to the Union for the Liberation of Lithuania and which united many Lithuanian pro-communist activists. In April, he became a secretary of the union and editor of its newspaper Tėvynės frontas (Homeland's Front). The union had more than 500 members and supported Soviet partisans. In May, he was elected first secretary of the reestablished Vilnius committee of the Communist Party of Lithuania with several representatives of Polish (including Jan Przewalski of the Union of Active Struggle and later the Union of Polish Patriots) and Jewish (including Yitzhak Wittenberg of Fareynikte Partizaner Organizatsye) underground. Vitas planned on getting an official approval for these organizations from Moscow and, reportedly, had arranged a meeting with Antanas Sniečkus. However, on 19 July 1943, Vitas' was arrested by the Gestapo and later executed (exact date unknown).

=== Posthumous recognition ===
Soviet censors suppressed Vitas' biography due to his brother Ignas Valūnas who owned a restaurant in Alytus and thus was deemed a "bourgeoisie oppressor". He and his family were deported in March 1949 to the Krasnoyarsk Krai. Valūnas was released from deportation in 1956 and rehabilitated in 1959. Vitas was awarded the Order of the Cross of Grunwald in 1964 and was named Hero of the Soviet Union in 1965.
