= Krekenava Eldership =

Eldership of Lithuania

The Krekenava Eldership (Lithuanian: Krekenavos seniūnija) is an eldership of Lithuania, located in the Panevėžys District Municipality. In 2021 its population was 3526.
