= Juozas Krikštaponis =

Commander of the anti-Soviet Lithuanian partisans

Colonel Juozas Krikštaponis
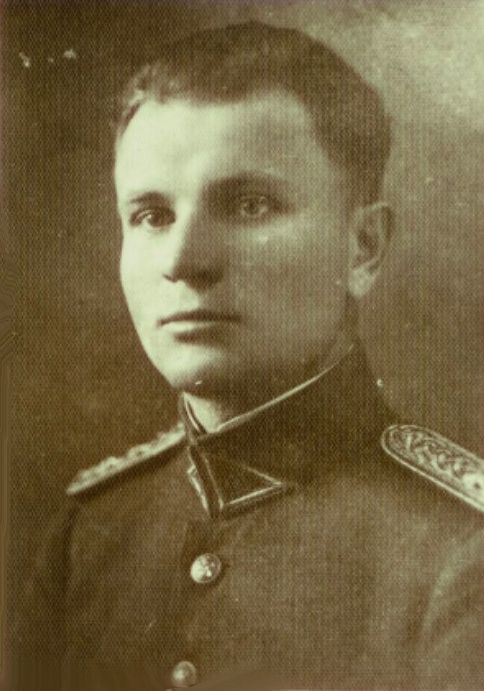

Commander of the Vytis military district
- In office December 1944 – 12 January 1945
- Succeeded by: Danielius Vaitelis

Personal details
- Born: 1 March 1912 Užulėnis, Lithuania
- Died: 12 January 1945 (aged 32) Lėnas, Lithuanian SSR
- Spouse: Kunigunda Sliesoraitytė
- Occupation: Lithuanian partisan

Military service
- Years of service: 1934–1940 (Lithuanian Army); 1940–1941 (Red Army); 1941–1942 (Lithuanian Auxiliary Police); 1943–1944 (Lithuanian Liberty Army); 1944 (Lithuanian Territorial Defense Force); 1944–1945 (Lithuanian partisans)

Juozas Krikštaponis (1 March 1912 – 12 January 1945) was a Lithuanian anti-Soviet partisan and founder of the Vytis military district.

== Biography ==
=== Early life and military service ===
Juozas Krikštaponis was born on 1 March 1912 in Užulėnis. His father, Jonas Krikštaponis, was a book smuggler who smuggled books from present-day Kaliningrad. His mother, Morta Krikštaponienė, was a sister of Antanas Smetona. Krikštaponis attended primary school in Užugiris, and later was educated at the Raguva Gymnasium and Marijampolė Gymnasium. After his mother's encouragement, Krikštaponis enrolled in the War School of Kaunas, graduating on 15 September 1934 with the rank of junior lieutenant and being assigned to the 2nd Infantry Regiment. On 31 December 1936, Krikštaponis was promoted to lieutenant. On 19 August 1938, Krikštaponis became a squad leader. That same year, he married Kunigunda Sliesoraitytė, with whom he had no children. Around 1939 Krikštaponis was promoted to captain.

=== Occupation ===
After the Soviet Union occupied Lithuania, on 3 October 1940, Krikštaponis was made an instructor of physical education at the 29th Lithuanian Territorial Rifle Corps 184th division. After Operation Barbarossa, Krikštaponis deserted from the Red Army.

==== Alleged participation in the Holocaust ====
During German occupation, on 1 August 1941, Krikštaponis was made the leader of the 2nd regiment of the Lithuanian TDA Battalion. After the TDA was reorganized into two battalions of auxiliary police, on 25 August, Krikštaponis was transferred to the second battalion. The battalion comprised three companies, with Krikštaponis heading the 2nd company from August to December. All three companies participated in the killing of over 15,000 Jews in various locations in Belarus, such as at the Rudzyensk ghetto. On 30 August 1942, Krikštaponis was either moved to the reserve or deserted. He also headed the underground anti-German National Front (Tautinis frontas) organization.

Krikštaponis's sister Veronika claimed in her memoirs that Krikštaponis, for the duration of German occupation, was hiding from both the German police and Soviet partisans, and at one point was jailed in the Kaunas Prison. Krikštaponis's participation in the Holocaust has been described as propaganda spread by the NKVD and KGB, and condemnation of the partisan has been criticized by far-right politician Vytautas Sinica.

=== Partisan leader ===
From 1943, Krikštaponis served in the Lithuanian Liberty Army (LLA). In 1944 Krikštaponis was briefly made a commander of the Lithuanian Territorial Defense Force's 6th regiment in the Marijampolė Military School. In August 1944, Krikštaponis became the leader of the LLA's second district, which was established around Taujėnai and Deltuva. After the establishment of the Vytis military district in December, Krikštaponis was made its first leader with Danielius Vaitelis as his deputy. It is known that Krikštaponis organized fights against the NKVD near Pagiriai.

Krikštaponis and fourteen other Lithuanian partisans died on 12 January 1945 in the village of Lėnas after a battle with the NKVD.

== Remembrance ==
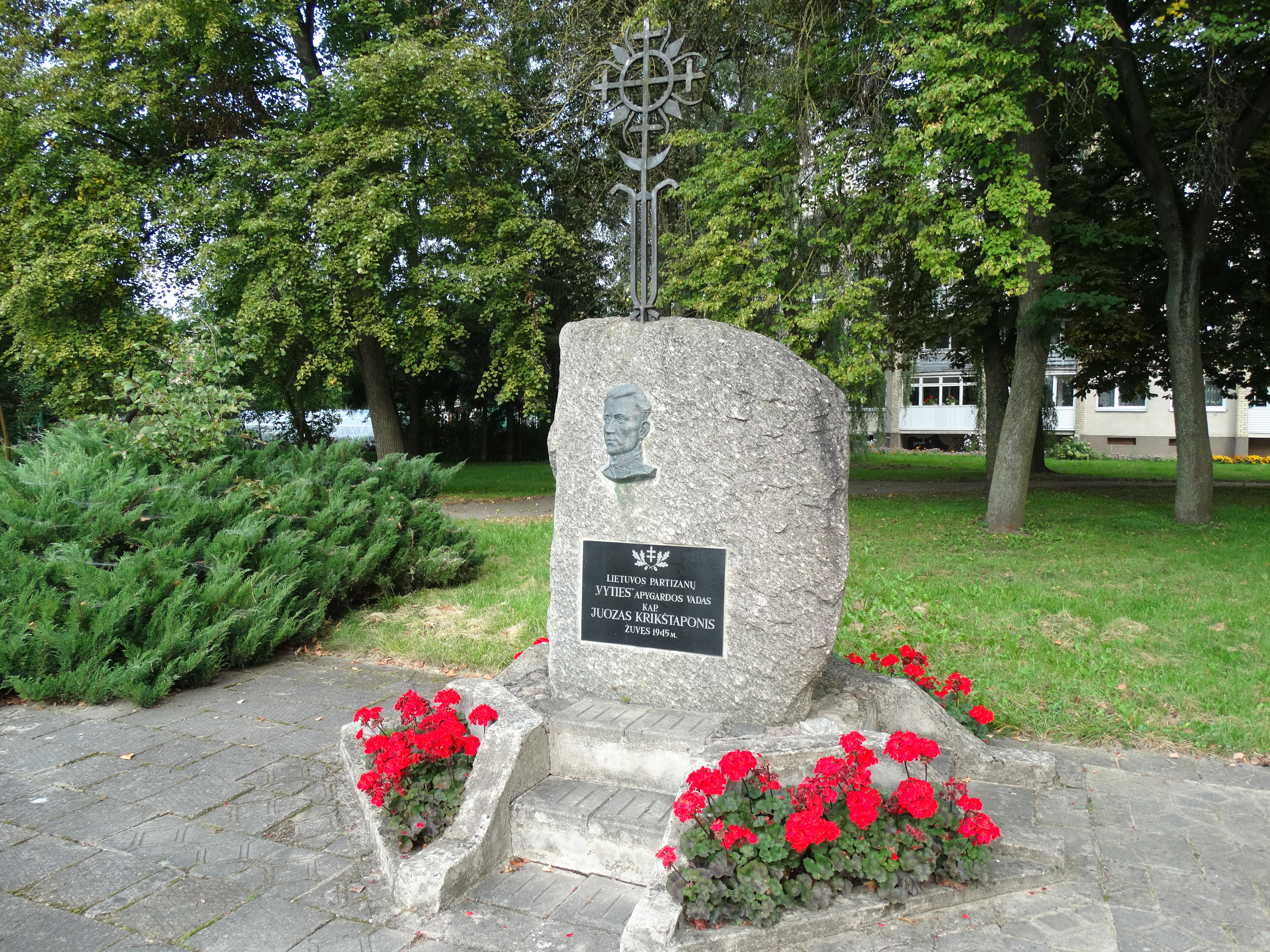
Memorial stone dedicated to Krikštaponis in Ukmergė

A detachment of partisans was named after him in 1949. A memorial cross was erected where Krikštaponis died in 1991. A memorial stone was put in Ukmergė in 1996. In 2002 he was posthumously rewarded the rank of colonel by the president of Lithuania. He was also awarded the Order of the Cross of Vytis, 1st degree. In 2023, the Genocide and Resistance Research Centre of Lithuania recommended removing the bas-relief of Krikštaponis in Ukmergė. Additionally, Krikštaponis's commemoration was criticized by United States ambassador to Lithuania Robert S. Gilchrist, historian Mindaugas Pocius, and the Lithuanian Jewish community.

== Bibliography ==
- Gaidelis, Povilas (2019). 100 širdžių – ant tėvynės laisvės kovų aukuro (in Lithuanian). Vilnius: Briedis. ISBN 9789955266716.
