= Fighters for Freedom. Lithuanian Partisans Versus the U.S.S.R. =

1950 book by Juozas Lukša

- Cover page of the second English edition
- Author: Juozas Lukša
- Language: Lithuanian
- Genre: Memoir, documentary
- Publication date: 1950
- English publication date: 1975

Fighters for Freedom. Lithuanian Partisans Versus the U.S.S.R. is an autobiographical account of the struggles of the anti-Soviet Lithuanian partisans written by Juozas Lukša (nom de guerre Daumantas), one of the leaders of the partisans. The book became one of the most important and well known accounts of Soviet crimes against the population of Lithuania and of the life of the partisans. The book was first published in Lithuanian in 1950 and has been translated to English, Swedish, German, and Ukrainian. The original Lithuanian book has been reprinted six times.

The book was written by Lukša under the original title Partizanai už geležinės uždangos (Partisans Behind the Iron Curtain) during his stay in Paris in 1948–1950. It is based on memories of Lukša and documents of the Lithuanian partisans and describes the first three years of the Soviet occupation (1944–1947). Lukša describes the hard life of the partisans, the Soviet terror on Lithuanian people, and the crossing of the Iron Curtain at the end of 1947 to the West. He, along with fellow partisans Jurgis Krikščiūnas–Rimvydas and Kazimieras Pyplys–Mažytis, crossed through the Iron Curtain as messengers to the West in hopes to attract support for the fighters and to establish contacts with Lithuanians in exile. They carried information collected by partisans about Soviet repressions, killings, and deportations, and also a letter to Pope Pius XII explaining the situation in occupied Lithuania and asking for support for the struggling nation. Lukša returned to Lithuania – he was parachuted to Lithuanian forests in 1950. For a year, he was intensively searched for by the Soviet counterintelligence. Finally, he was betrayed by fellow fighter Jonas Kukauskas and killed in fall 1951.

== Editions ==
English

- Daumantas, Juozas (1975). Fighters For Freedom. Lithuanian Partisans Versus the U.S.S.R. Translated by E. J. Harrison. New York: Manyland Books. p. 254. OCLC 642030829.
- Daumantas, Juozas (1988). Fighters For Freedom. Lithuanian Partisans Versus the U.S.S.R. Translated by E. J. Harrison (2nd ed.). New York: The Lithuanian Canadian Committee for Human Rights. p. 279. ISBN 0-87141-049-4.
- Lukša, Juozas (2009). Forest Brothers: The Account of an Anti-Soviet Lithuanian Freedom Fighter, 1944–1948. Translated by Laima Vincė. Budapest: Central European University Press. p. 411. ISBN 978-963-9776-37-1.

Lithuanian

- Daumantas, Juozas (1950). Partizanai: už geležinės uždangos (in Lithuanian). Chicago: Lietuvių katalikų spaudos draugija. p. 398. OCLC 1052034.
- Daumantas, Juozas (1962). Partizanai (in Lithuanian) (2nd ed.). Chicago: Į Laisvę fondas lietuviškai kultūrai ugdyti. p. 510. OCLC 7195673.
- Daumantas, Juozas (1984). Partizanai (in Lithuanian) (3rd ed.). Chicago: Į Laisvę fondas lietuviškai kultūrai ugdyti. p. 572. OCLC 12064588.
- Daumantas, Juozas (1990). Partizanai (in Lithuanian) (3rd ed.). Chicago: Į Laisvę fondas lietuviškai kultūrai ugdyti. p. 574. ISBN 5415008098.
- Daumantas, Juozas (1990). Partizanai (in Lithuanian) (3rd ed.). Vilnius: Vaga. p. 574. ISBN 5-415-00809-8.
- Daumantas, Juozas (2005). Kasparas, Kęstutis (ed.). Partizanai (in Lithuanian) (5th ed.). Kaunas: Lietuvos politinių kalinių ir tremtinių sąjunga. p. 798. ISBN 9986-577-54-3.
- Daumantas, Juozas (2015). Partizanai (in Lithuanian) (6th ed.). Kaunas: Obuolys. p. 461. ISBN 978-609-403-775-7.

Other

- Lukša, Juozas (2005). Skogsbröder: den väpnade kampen i Litauen mot Sovjetockupationen (in Swedish). Translated by Jonas Öhman. Stockholm: Bäckström. p. 339. ISBN 91-89394-25-9.
- Lukša, Juozas (2010). Partisanen. Baltische Bibliothek im BaltArt Verlag (in German). Vol. 3. Translated by Markus Roduner. Langenthal: BaltArt-Verlag. p. 351. ISBN 978-3-9523109-2-2.
- Daumantas, Juozas (2016). Браття лiсовії (Партизани Литви): документальнi спогади (in Ukrainian). Ternopil: Krok. p. 452. ISBN 978-617-692-329-9.
