= Geležiai =

- Town
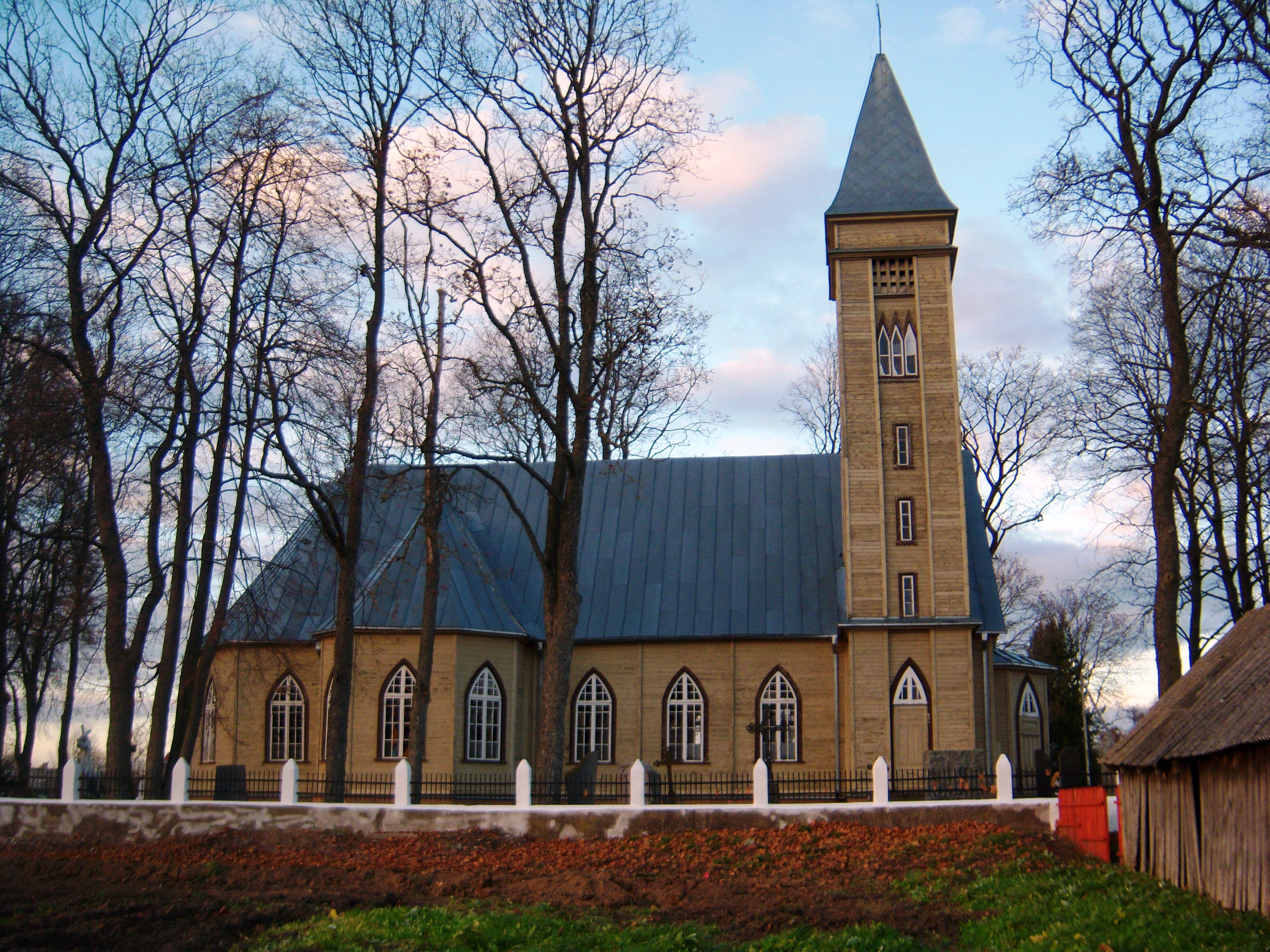

- Location within Lithuania
- Coordinates: 55°50′30″N 24°42′0″E
- Country: Lithuania
- County: Panevėžys County

Population (2011)
  - Total: 317
- Time zone: UTC+2 (EET)
  - Summer (DST): UTC+3 (EEST)

Geležiai is a small town in Panevėžys County, in northeastern Lithuania. According to the 2011 census, the town has a population of 317 people.

== Etymology ==
The etymology of the toponym "Gelẽžiai" is not fully elucidated. One hypothesis suggests that it derives from the given name Gelẽžis, Gelẽžius. Alternatively, it may have originated from a person's occupation, specifically the Lithuanian word gelẽžius, which means "blacksmith" or "iron seller." The town's name in other languages is translated as: Polish: Giełaże.
