= Pivonija Eldership =

Eldership of Lithuania

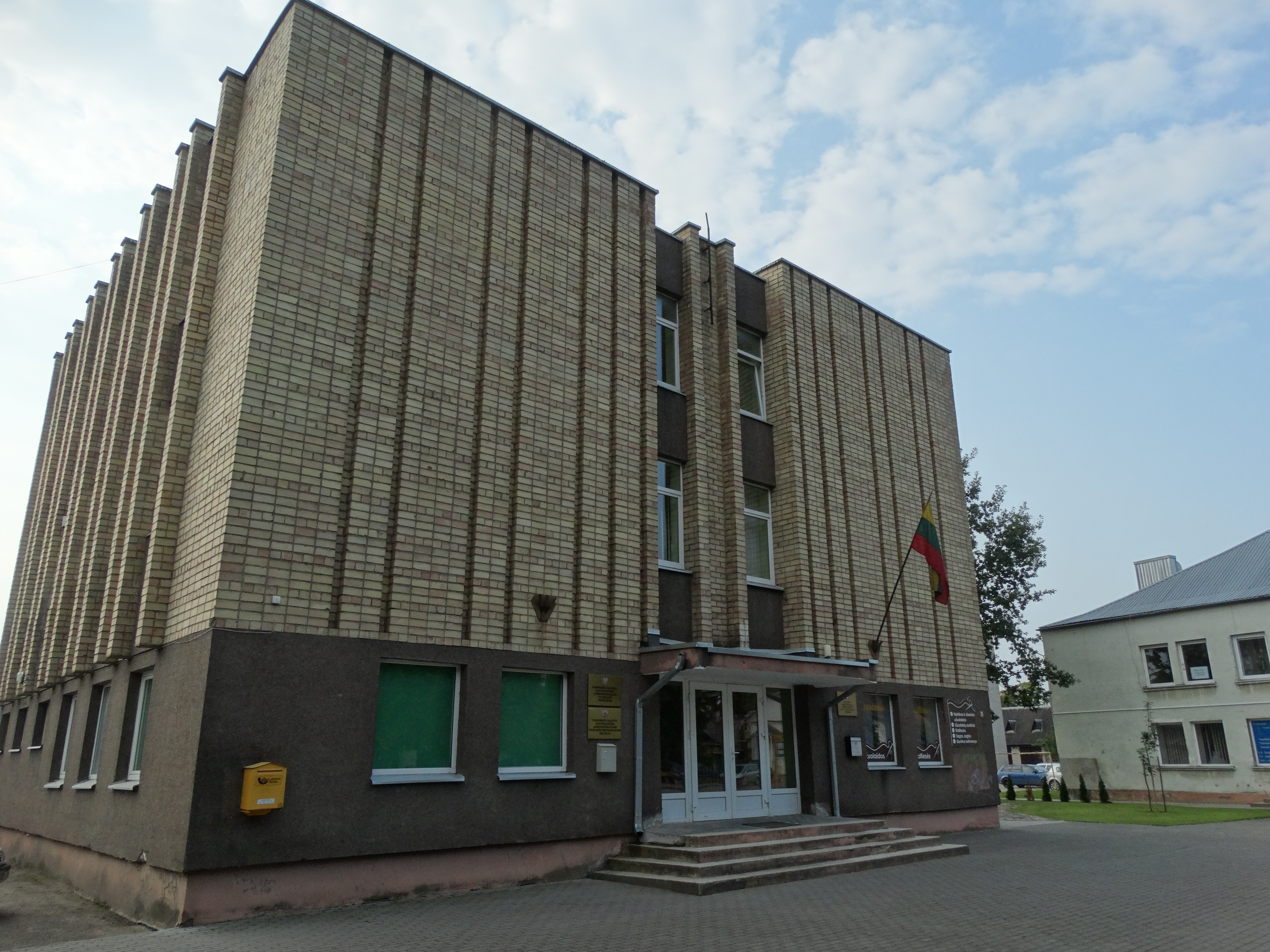
Eldership of Pivonija, Ukmergė, Lithuania

The Pivonija Eldership (Lithuanian: Pivonijos seniūnija) is an eldership of Lithuania, located in the Ukmergė District Municipality. In 2021 its population was 1160.
