= Taujėnai =

- Town
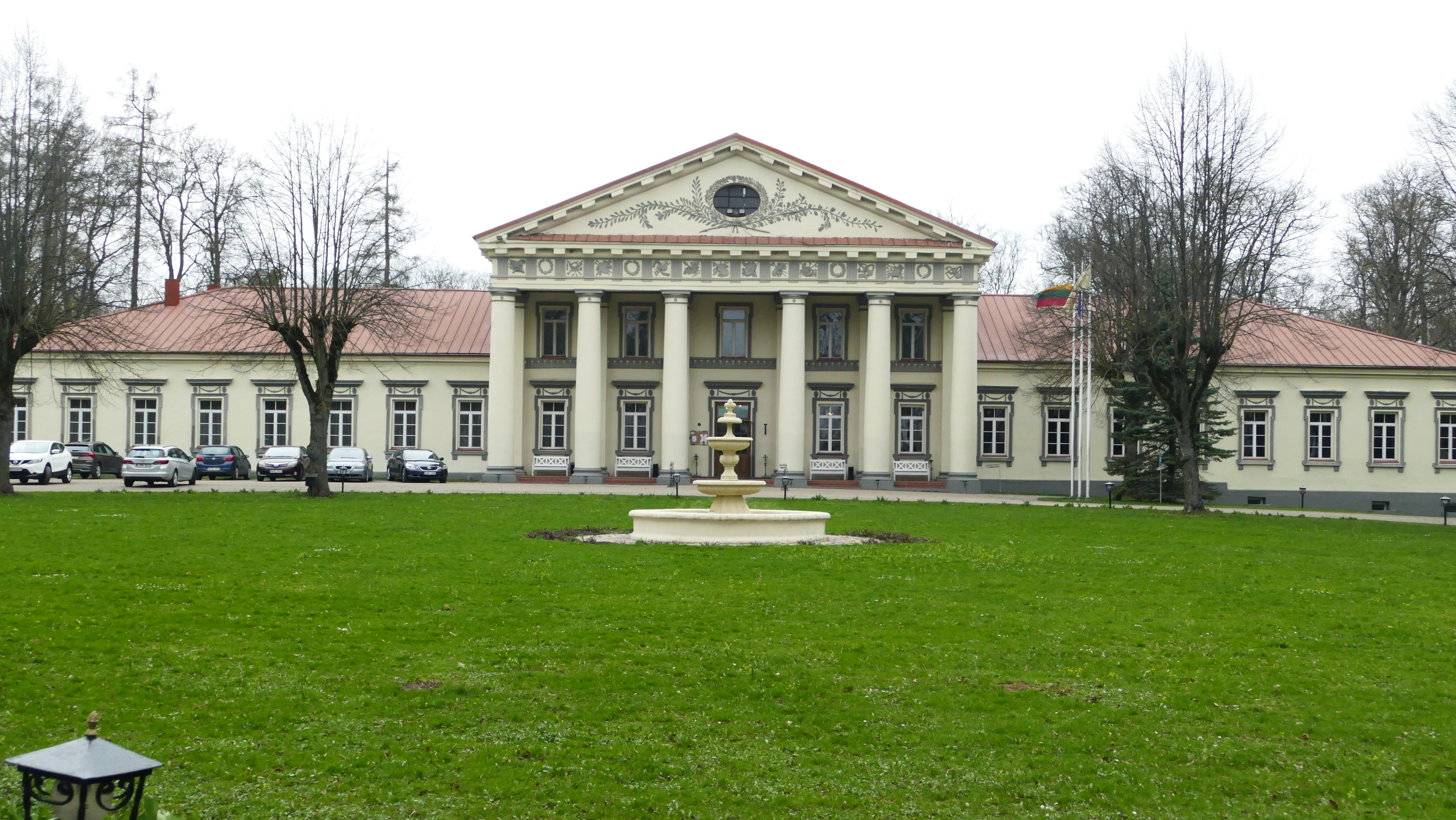
- Taujėnai Manor

- Location of Taujėnai in Lithuania
- Coordinates: 55°23′31″N 24°45′50″E
- Country: Lithuania
- County: Vilnius County
- Municipality: Ukmergė district municipality
- Eldership: Taujėnai eldership

Population (2011)
  - Total: 365
- Time zone: UTC+2 (EET)
  - Summer (DST): UTC+3 (EEST)

Taujėnai is a town in Ukmergė district municipality, Vilnius County, Eastern Lithuania. According to the Lithuanian census of 2011, the town has a population of 365 people. The town has a Catholic church, which survives together with the manor house, a classical-style palace (from the 18th century) and a park. Taujėnai has a high school, a library and a post office (ZIP code: 20054). There is also a monument built in 1928 and rebuilt in 1989 in honor of Lithuanian Independence.

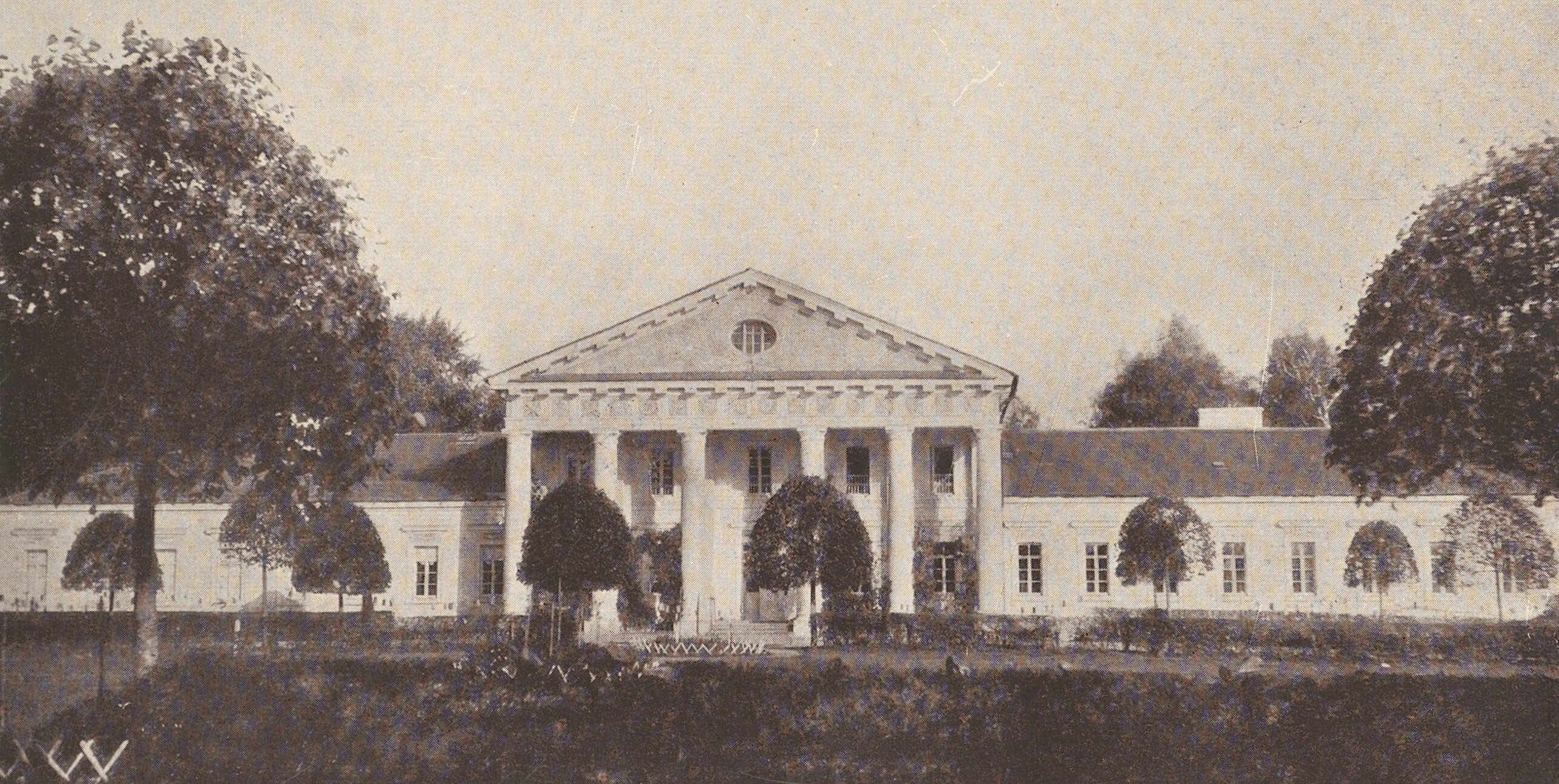
Manor house before 1911
