= Vytis military district =

Lithuanian partisan district

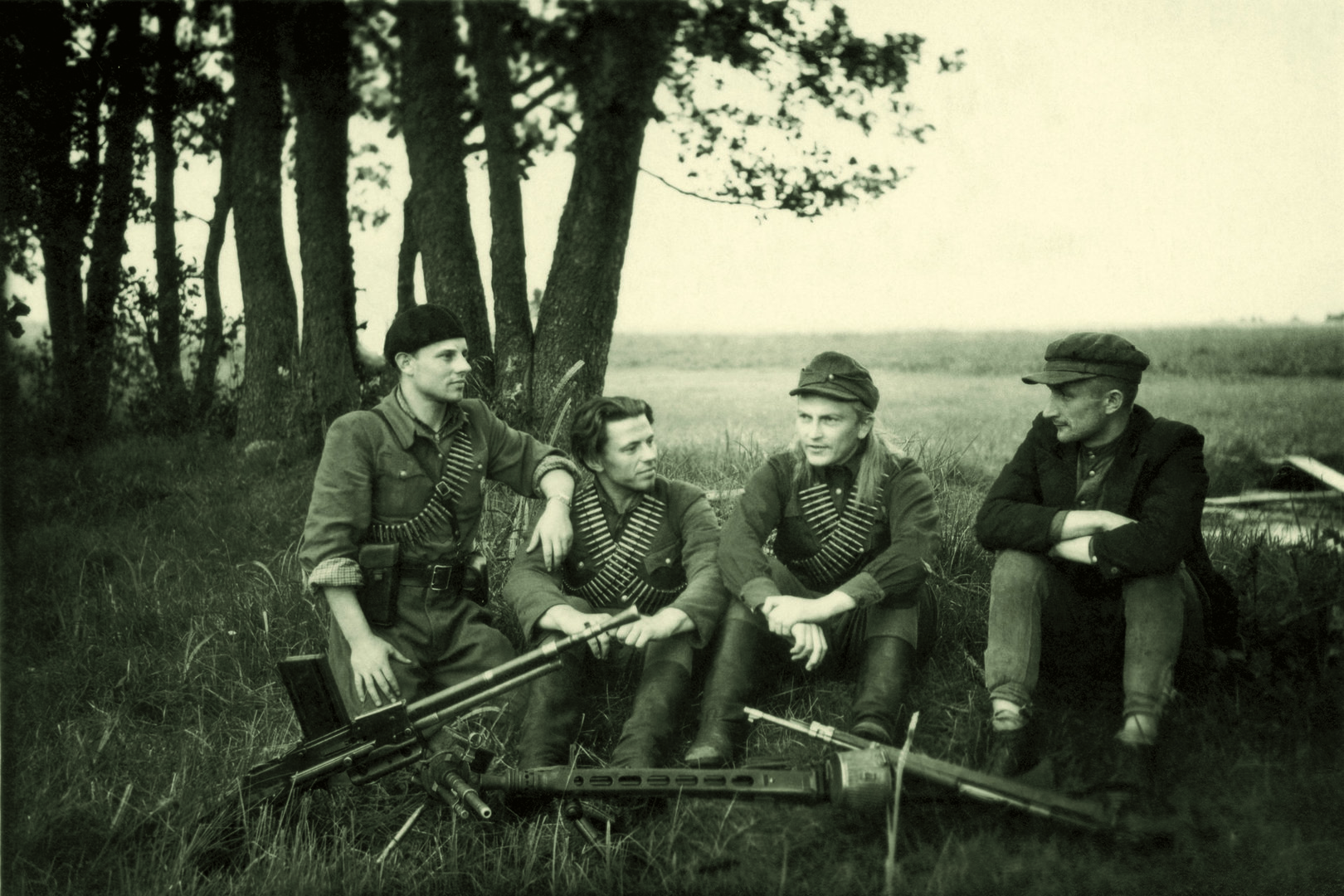
Partisans of the district in 1946

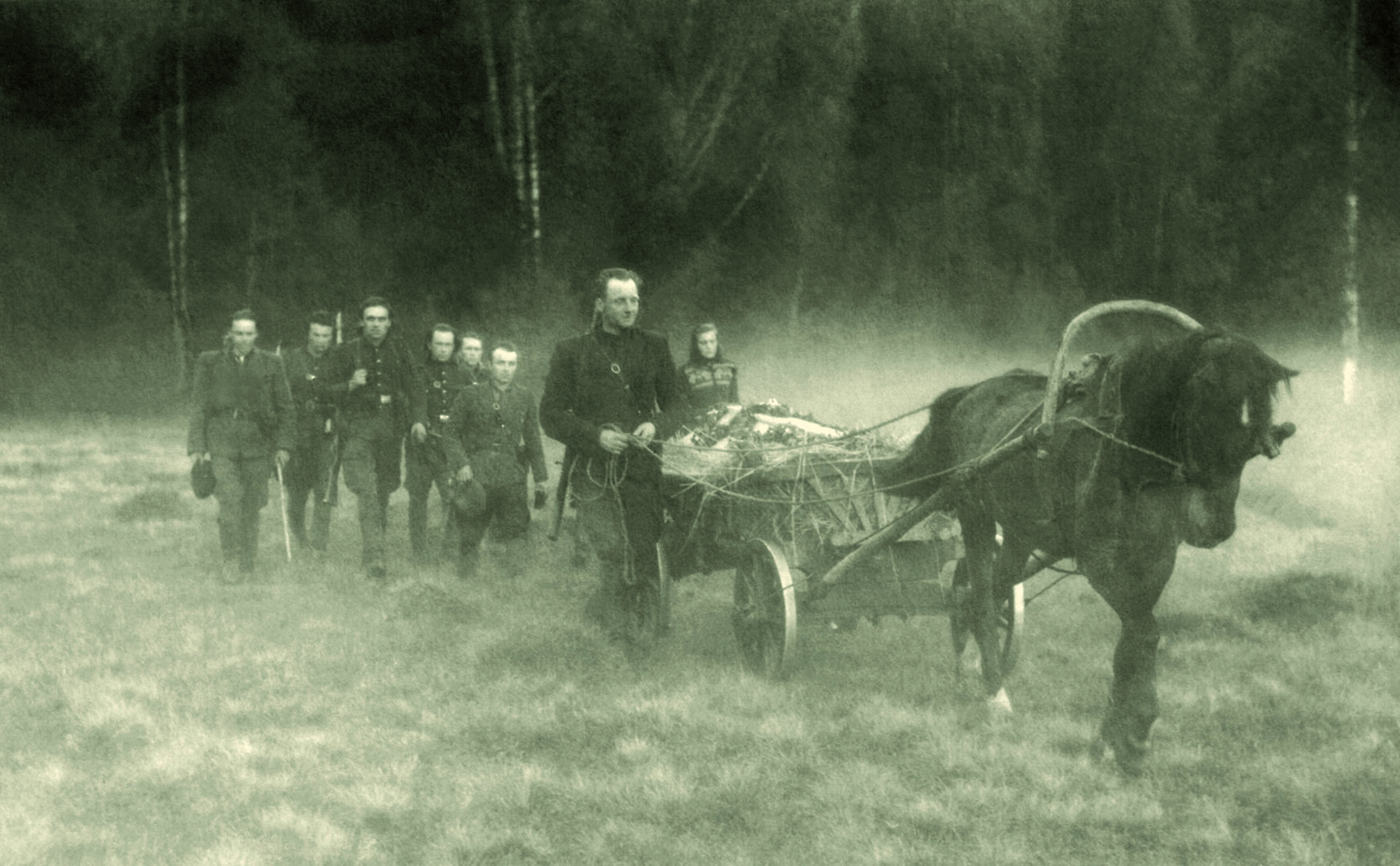
Burial ceremony of the Vytis military district Briedis (Moose) team Žaibas (Thunder) squad commander Antanas Žilys-Žaibas in 1949

Vytis military district (also Vytis partisan military district) is a military district of Lithuanian partisans which operated in 1944–1953 in the counties of Panevėžys and Ukmergė as well in some parts of the Kėdainiai county. The military district consisted of two territorial detachments (rinktinė) named Briedis and Krištaponis.

== Leaders ==
Name and surname	Nom de guerre	Since	Till	Comments
Juozas Krikštaponis		1944 December	1945 January	died in the line of duty
Danielius Vaitelis	Atamanas, Briedis	1945 January	1948 May	died in the line of duty
Alfonsas Smetona	Ramūnas, Žygaudas	1948 May	1950 July	died in the line of duty
Mykolas Šemežys	Aras, Šepetys, Putinas	1950 August	1951 April	died in the line of duty
Bronius Karbočius	Bitė, Algimantas	1951 May	1953 January	died in the line of duty

== Structure of Lithuanian partisans' organisation ==
LLKS
Western Lithuania (Jūra) region	Southern Lithuania (Nemunas) region	Eastern Lithuania (King Mindaugas) region
Žemaičiai military district	Prisikėlimas military district	Kęstutis military district	Tauras military district	Dainava military district	Algimantas military district	Vytautas military district	Vytis military district	Didžioji Kova military district
Alka	Maironis	Vaidotas	Vytautas	Dzūkai	Žalioji	Tigras	Krikštaponis
Šatrija	Duke Žvelgaitis	Birutė	Žalgiris	Šarūnas	Šarūnas	Liūtas	Briedis
Kardas	Juozapavičius	Butageidis	Geležinis vilkas	Kazimieraitis	Duke Margiris	Lokys
Lietuvos žalioji
