= Vadokliai =

- Town
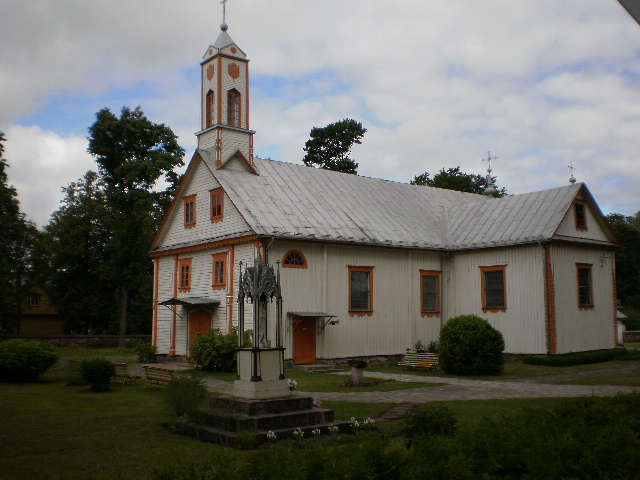

- Flag Coat of arms

- Location within Lithuania
- Coordinates: 55°29′40″N 24°28′10″E
- Country: Lithuania
- County: Panevėžys County

Population (2011)
  - Total: 519
- Time zone: UTC+2 (EET)
  - Summer (DST): UTC+3 (EEST)

Vadokliai is a small town in Panevėžys County, in northeastern Lithuania.

Its variant names include Vadoklia, Vadoklių, Vadoklyay, Vadukle (Yiddish), and Wodakle (Polish).

== History ==
The earliest mention of Vadokliai can be found in the Livonian Chronicle. 18th century sources mention Vadokliai manor, which was owned by the Belazaras family in 1726. In 1781, the lord of the manor, Anupras Belazaras helped to construct the church of Vadokliai. A primary school of Saulė Society was opened in 1908.

Before the First World War, Vadokliai had a watermill, book bindery, bakery shops and flax processing companies.

In 1919, during the Lithuanian Wars of Independence, fights against the Bolsheviks took place near Vadokliai. Fallen Lithuanian volunteers were interred in the town's cemetery.

During the interwar period, Vadokliai was the centre of valsčius. It had a police station, a healthcare centre and a retirement home. In 1928, a memorial was built to people who died for Lithuania's independence.

After the Second World War, Lithuanian partisans were active around Vadokliai. There is a memorial stone erected for partisans, who were killed during the anti-Soviet resistance near Vadokliai.

On October 29, 2006, another monument for Lithuanian partisans was unveiled.

On August 12, 2008, the town's coat of arms was officially accepted by the President of Lithuania.

== Demographics ==
The 1970 census listed 401 residents, 1983 census – 716, and the 1987 census listed 593. According to the 2011 census, the town has a population of 519 residents.
