= Juozas Lukša =

Lithuanian resistance partisan (1921–1951)

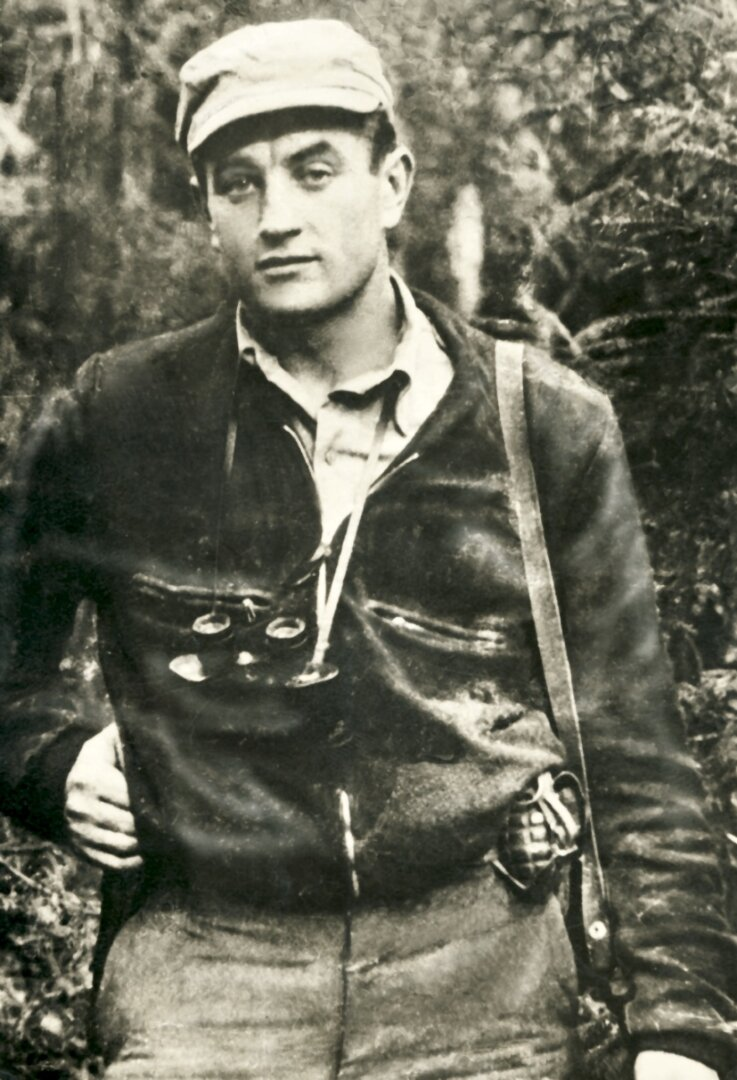
- Born: 10 August 1921; Juodbūdis, Prienai District, Republic of Lithuania
- Died: 4 September 1951 (aged 30); Pabartupis, Kaunas District, Lithuanian SSR
- Cause of death: Gunshot wounds
- Other names: Daumantas, Skirmantas
- Education: Vytautas Magnus University

Juozas Lukša (10 August 1921 – 4 September 1951), also known by other pseudonyms such as Daumantas and Skirmantas, was a leader of the anti-Soviet Lithuanian partisan armed resistance movement.

== Life ==
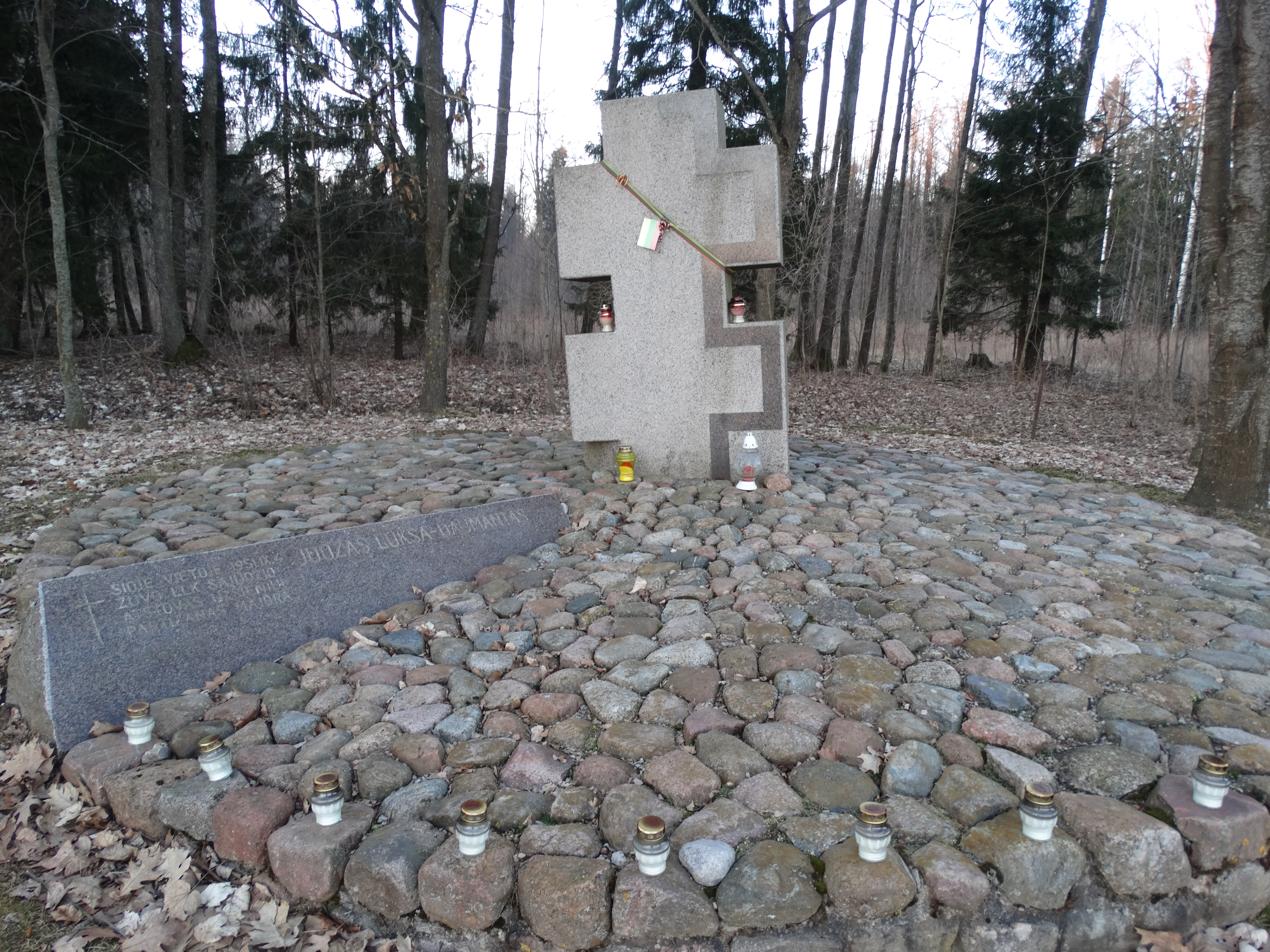
Memorial cross in the place where Juozas Lukša died

Lukša was born on 10 August 1921 to a family of farmers in the village of Juodbūdis, near Kaunas. He attended Kaunas "Aušros" high school, where he joined the catholic youth organization Ateitis and the far-right, anti-semitic, and anti-Soviet Lithuanian Activist Front (LAF). He graduated high school in 1940 and began studying architecture at Vytautas Magnus University.

Due to being a member of the LAF, Lukša was imprisoned by the NKVD in Kaunas during the 1940–41 Soviet occupation of the Baltic states. He was released by the Wehrmacht following the invasion of Lithuania by Nazi Germany, and went on to continue his architecture studies.

After the return of the Red Army in 1944, Lukša engaged in the underground movement. At first, he participated as a student, helping out with clandestine matters and unarmed resistance in Kaunas. In 1946, after the arrests of many activists, he left the city and joined the armed resistance. Within a year, he commanded the Birutė brigade of the Tauras military district.

At the end of 1947, along with fellow partisans Jurgis Krikščiūnas-Rimvydas and Kazimieras Pyplys-Mažytis, Lukša crossed through the Iron Curtain with the goal of attracting support for the fighters and establishing contacts with Lithuanians in exile. They carried information collected by partisans about Soviet repressions, killings, and deportations, and a letter asking for support from Pope Pius XII. He arrived in Sweden and moved from there to France and West Germany, where he was trained by French intelligence agents and the CIA. While in Paris, he met doctor Nijolė Virginija Bražėnaitė, whom he married on 23 July 1950.

During his stay in the West, Lukša wrote Fighters for Freedom (Lithuanian: Partizanai už geležinės uždangos), a firsthand account of partisan activities in 1944–47. He was parachuted back into Lithuania by the CIA sometime between 1949 and 1950. That year, he was granted the honorary title of "Hero of the Lithuanian Freedom Fighters" (Laisvės kovos karžygio garbės vardas) and awarded with the Cross of the Freedom Struggle (1st class) by the Union of Lithuanian Freedom Fighters. In 1951, he was granted a rank of "Major of Partisans" (Partizanų majoro laipsnis).

Lukša was intensively searched for by the Soviet counterintelligence, before being killed near Pabartupis by the MGB in the fall of 1951.

== Legacy ==
In 1997, Juozas Lukša was posthumously awarded the Order of the Cross of Vytis (first class).

In 2004, director Jonas Vaitkus released a movie based on Lukša's life entitled Utterly Alone. In 2014, co-directors Jonas Ohman and Vincas Sruoginis released a documentary entitled The Invisible Front on Lukša and his fellow "Forest Brothers".

In June 2020, the Lithuanian parliament's Committee on Education and Science submitted a proposal to designate 2021 as the "Year of Juozas Lukša-Daumantas."

The Central European University Press published a fresh English translation of Lukša's book in 2009 under the title Forest Brothers: The Account of an Anti-Soviet Lithuanian Freedom Fighter, 1944-1948, ISBN 978-9639776371.

== Alleged participation in the Kaunas pogrom ==
During the Nazi occupation of Lithuania, according to multiple witnesses, Lukša was a participant in the 1941 Lietukis garage massacres in Kaunas, and allegedly took part in the murder and decapitation of Rabbi Zalman Osovsky. The Lithuanian government denies these claims.

== See also ==
- Lithuanian partisans
