= Henrikas Danilevičius =

Lithuanian partisan (1922–1949)

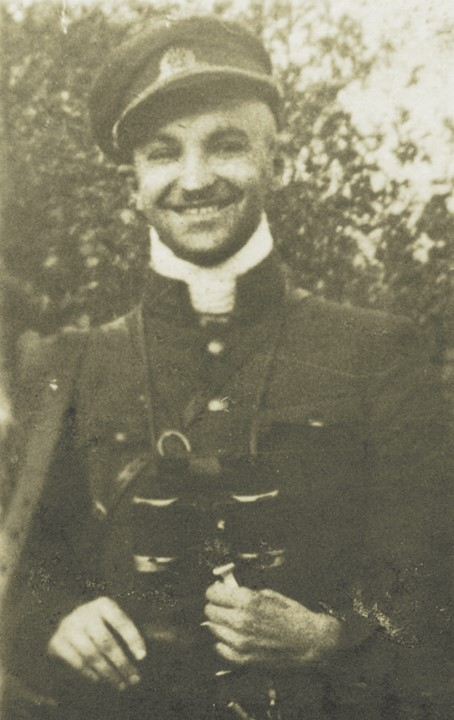

Commander of the Kęstutis military district
- In office 8 July 1948 – April 1949
- Preceded by: Jonas Žemaitis
- Succeeded by: Aleksas Miliulis

Personal details
- Born: 18 July 1922 Miliūnai, Zarasai District Municipality, Republic of Lithuania
- Died: 1 November 1949 (aged 27) Šimonys forest, Panevėžys District Municipality, Lithuanian SSR
- Education: Kaunas school of technics
- Occupation: Lithuanian partisan

Military service
- Allegiance: Lithuania
- Years of service: 1945-1949 (Lithuanian partisans)
- Rank: Colonel (1998; posthumous)

Henrikas Danilevičius, also widely known as Vidmantas (18 July 1922 – 1 November 1949) was a teacher, Lithuanian partisan, and one of the commanders of the Kęstutis military district. He was also known by his other codenames like Danila, Kerštas, Žinys, Algis, and Neringa.

== Biography ==
=== Early life ===
Henrikas Danilevičius was born on 18 July 1922 in the Miliūnai manor in the Zarasai district of Lithuania. His father Stasys Danilevičius was a policeman. In the beginning he was educated privately at home. After moving to Alytus, from 1932 to 1933 he attended the Miroslavas gymnasium, though at one point he attended second and third grades in Panevėžys as his father was stationed there. He further attended gymnasiums in Alytus (1933-1934), Panevėžys (1934-1936) and Zarasai (1936-1937) respectively. In 1937, he traveled to Kaunas to study at the Kaunas higher technic school, which he attended up until the Soviet occupation of Lithuania. In 1940, he got a job as a technician in Kaunas, as he did not have enough money to pay for his education; his father's pension was lost due to his death while being stationed at a train station in Kaunas, as well as his family's wealth being confiscated. From 1941 to 1944, he worked as a technician in Zarasai, supporting his mother and sister. In 1944, as the war was coming to an end, Danilevičius was betrothed to medic Sofia Jurgelionytė and traveled to Žemaitija to his relatives to invite them to the upcoming wedding. While visiting Eržvilkas in the Tauragė district, Lithuania was re-occupied by the Soviet Union. To avoid repressions he stayed in Žemaitija and decided to work there. Here he contacted the local partisans of Eržvilkas and became an active member of the partisan movement.

=== As a teacher ===
By 1945, Danilevičius was a teacher in Eržvilkas gymnasium. After the partisan company was reorganized into the Lyda (later Butigeidis) company in 1945, he worked in the headquarters of the company. Later on, he headed its information division. Danilevičius mainly organized the delivery of medical supplies and the underground press of the resistance. After the persecution of Soviet security increased, he briefly went into armed resistance, but after the suspicions subsided, he returned to work as a teacher. From 1945 to 1946, he was the director of the gymnasium in Eržvilkas. After the leader (and also a teacher of Eržvilkas gymnasium) of the Lydis company went to study in Vilnius, Danilevičius essentially became the head of the partisan company in 1945. He jointly organized negotiations between partisan companies in order to establish a district on equal footing. After fear of being tracked down by Soviet agents, in 1946 he went into the underground resistance, publicly declaring that he was shot by partisans for being the director of a high school.

=== As a partisan ===
Danilevičius contributed to efforts of the creation of the partisan district. In 1946, among other partisan leaders, he established the Kęstutis military district (whose head at the time was Juozas Kasperavičius). One of the most successful combat operations Danilevičius organized was the release of 23 political prisoners from the MGB prison in Tauragė. By 1947, he was stabilizing the organized resistance and its organizational structure, also being officially declared the leader of the Lydis company in the same year. In 1948 a new headquarters of the military district was created and Danilevičius was invited to work there. As the previous leader of the military district died the previous year, a meeting was held in regard to its new leadership. Jonas Žemaitis appointed Danilevičius as its new commander on June 8 or 9.

On December 1, 1948, Danilevičius left for Kaunas and got ambushed. Although he survived, due to his arbitrary decision to leave for Kaunas the western partisan leadership removed him from his post. Despite provocations by the MGB (attempting to sow distrust with individual partisans instead of physically eliminating them), close colleagues assured that Danilevičius was not a traitor. Danilevičius was later appointed as a representative of western Lithuanian partisans in the east. In the summer of 1949 he moved to Aukštaitija and established himself in the Algimantas military district. He was tasked with familiarizing the partisans of Aukštaitija with the resolutions of the leadership and helping to implement them. Danilevičius died on 1 November 1949, when his bunker was attacked by MGB agents. Even after his death, the MGB attempted to destroy Danilevičius's reputation amongst the partisans with him being a traitor. His and his colleagues' bodies were buried at their death site. The bodies weren't discovered until 1991, and later reburied in the Anykščiai district.

== Remembrance ==
In 1999, a typical commemorative sign was built at the death site of Danilevičius, as well as in the modern Eržvilkas gymnasium. In 1998, Danilevičius was awarded the rank of colonel via the president's decree. In 1999 he was awarded the Order of the Cross of Vytis 3rd degree.

== See also ==
- Anti-Soviet partisans
- Forest Brothers
