= Juozas Kasperavičius =

Colonel Juozas Kasperavičius
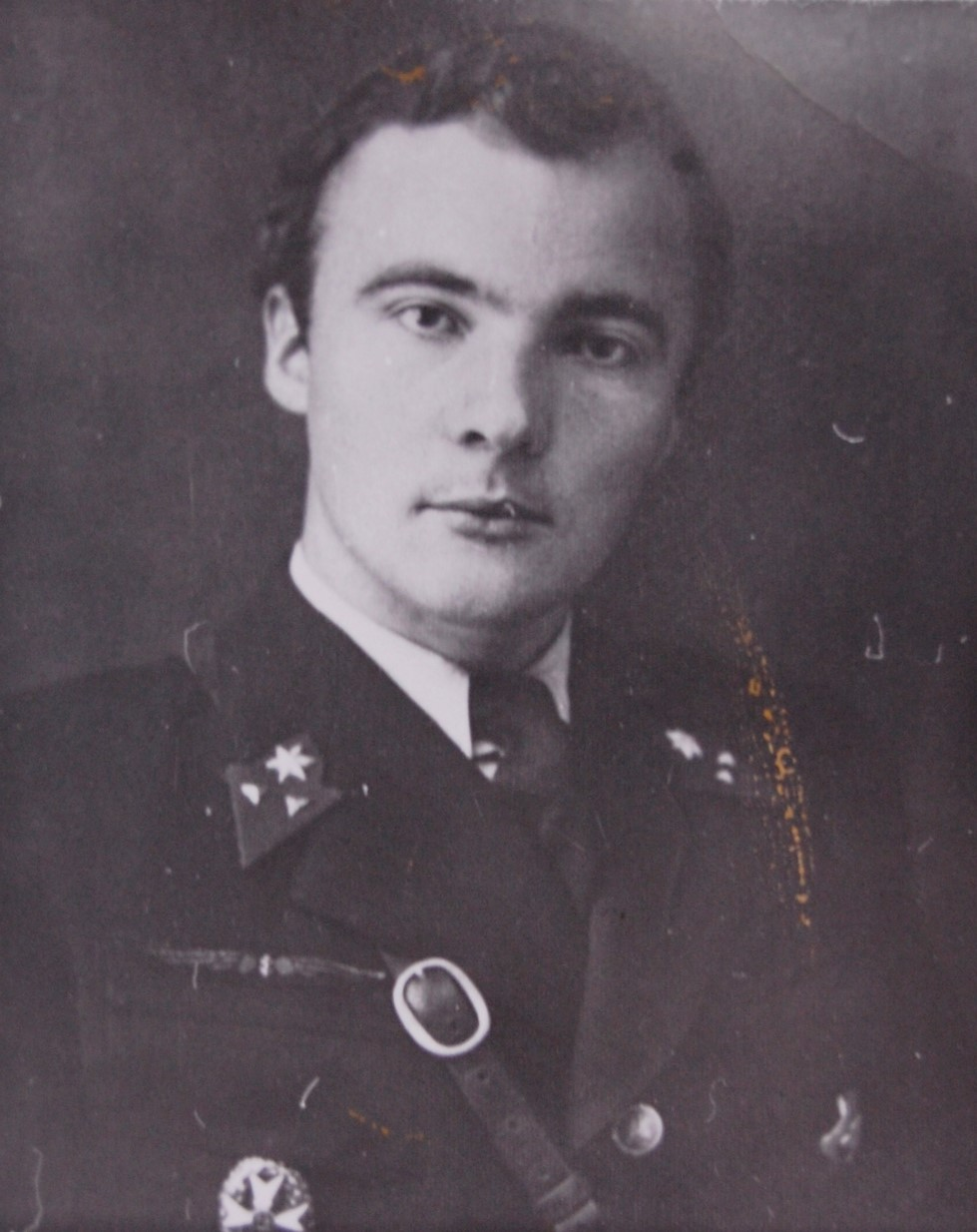
- Army officer, pilot, partisan leader Juozas Kasperavičius

Commander of the Kęstutis military district
- In office 12 September 1946 – 9 April 1947
- Succeeded by: Jonas Žemaitis

Personal details
- Born: 17 August 1912 Jokūbaičiai, Jurbarkas District Municipality, Republic of Lithuania
- Died: 9 April 1947 (aged 34) Antegluonis, Tauragė District Municipality, Lithuanian SSR
- Spouse: Birutė Razminaitė
- Children: 1
- Education: War School of Kaunas, Lithuanian military aviation school
- Occupation: Lithuanian partisan, officer, pilot
- Known for: Founder and first leader of the Kęstutis military district

Military service
- Allegiance: Lithuania
- Years of service: 1933–1940 (Lithuanian Army); 1941 (Lithuanian Liberty Army); 1945-1946 (Lithuanian partisans)
- Rank: Lieutenant (1938); Colonel (1998; posthumous)

Juozas Kasperavičius (codenames: Angis, Visvydas, Šilas; 17 August 1912 – 9 April 1947) was a Lithuanian partisan and pilot, founder of the partisan Kęstutis military district.

He was educated in the Kaunas War School as well as in the Lithuanian military aviation school, and served as a pilot both during interwar Lithuania and the first Soviet occupation. During Operation Barbarossa Kasperavičius stayed in Lithuania, where he was captured and interned by the German forces until 1941. After returning from capture he joined the Lithuanian Liberty Army. In 1945 he and his brother were detained - his brother was shot but Kasperavičius escaped, eventually being rescued by Lithuanian partisans from a military hospital. In 1946 he established the Kęstutis military district, becoming its leader. After the location of the headquarters was betrayed in 1947, Kasperavičius and his colleague blew themselves up to avoid capture in the ensuing firefight.

== Biography ==
=== Interwar Lithuania ===
Juozas Kasperavičius was born on 17 August 1912 in the village of Jokūbaičiai of Jurbarkas district to a family of well-off farmers. When he was in the sixth grade at the Jurbarkas Gymnasium, he decorated the Girdžiai town church during summer vacation. According to Kasperavičius, the pastor rewarded him eight hundred litai for the work (equivalent to four cows' worth). Kasperavičius was an avid reader from childhood and was curious about various arts and crafts. He once molded an entire furnace for his parents. Such skills would eventually help him in his partisanship. From 1933 to 1935 he studied at the Kaunas War School. In 1934 he was awarded the Order of Vytautas the Great, 3rd degree. After completing his studies Kasperavičius, now ranked junior lieutenant, was assigned to serve in an artillery regiment. In 1937 he finished his education in the military school of aviation and was deployed in Kaunas. During this time he met pianist Birutė Razminaitė, his future wife. In 1938 he was promoted to lieutenant. Kasperavičius also knew the French and German languages.

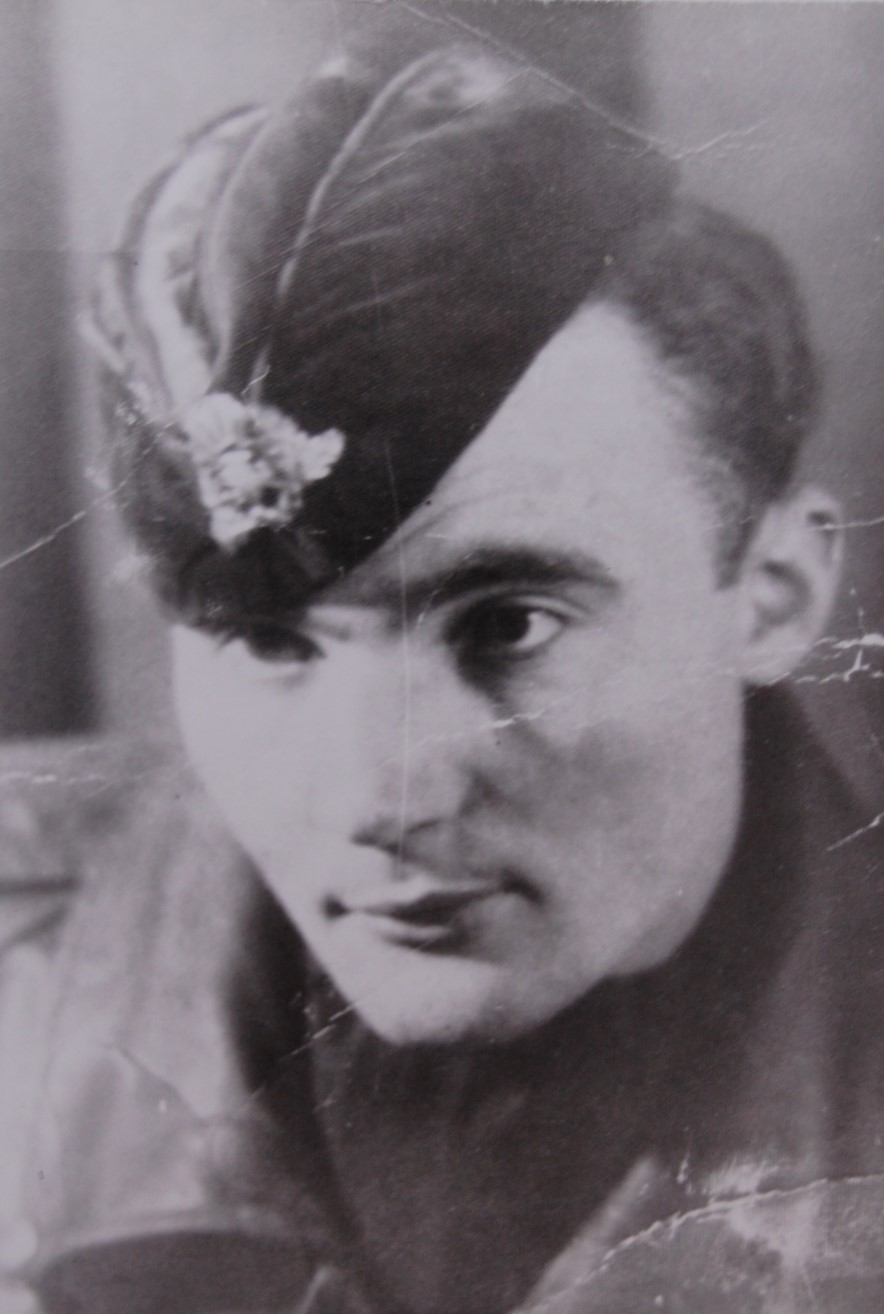
Lieutenant pilot Juozas Kasperavičius

=== Soviet occupation ===
Kasperavičius was preparing for his final exam to become a captain, however, the plans were interrupted after the USSR occupied Lithuania in 1940. Kasperavičius served in a squadron in Panevėžys as a detachment of the 29th Rifle Corps. The squadron was later moved to Joniškėlis and then Ukmergė. After the war with Germany began, the pilots were rallied in Pabradė and awaited the order to take off. Kasperavičius encouraged his colleagues not to take off and to stay in Lithuania. Only after taking off the pilots landed back in Siesikai instead of going to the Belorussian front. It was there that on June 24 Kasperavičius was detained by the Germans. Kasperavičius and thirteen other pilots spent more than half a year in German prison camps in Raseiniai, Prussia, and Austria.

Kasperavičius returned to Lithuania severely weakened and malnourished. After recovering he briefly worked in an agro-cooperative farm in Subačius. Here he joined the Lithuanian Liberty Army. As the Soviet army was getting closer, Kasperavičius along with his wife and daughter returned to his home village in Jokūbaičiai. The family on multiple occasions planned to migrate to the west, but they were never successful. In 1945 Kasperavičius and his brother Antanas were detained by the destruction battalions. While being driven to headquarters the carriage stopped, and the agents ordered the brothers to wait on a bridge. After chatting with each other, they were suddenly shot at by the agents. While trying to escape, Antanas was shot dead while Kasperavičius was heavily wounded, pretending to be dead. The agents dropped their bodies in the city center of Raseiniai. It is probable that the agents provoked the brothers to escape or simply decided to get rid of them. After it was seen that Juozas was still alive, he was put in a military hospital in a manor. Juozas's wife, and her acquaintance, a storage worker of the hospital, informed the partisans of the injured pilot. The local partisans, headed by Jonas Čeponis, rescued Kasperavičius by cutting the headquarters' telephone lines and disarming local security, as well as rescuing another injured person. The medical personnel of the hospital still took care of Kasperavičius in a bunker, but Kasperavičius soon departed to a village in Liaudiškiai. After Kasperavičius fully recovered, he joined the partisans under the codename Šilas.

=== Partisan activity ===
Kasperavičius joined the fighters of the Pavidaujas squad. After some time, he was assigned to the headquarters of the local group and was soon appointed the head of its operational department. Kasperavičius and his reputation of being able to escape and deceive enemy agents began to gain popularity. For example, having with him a fake passport in the name of Antanas Klimas, Kasperavičius often traveled all over Žemaitija on various partisan matters. Once, carrying an encrypted letter in his pocket, he fell directly into the hands of Russian soldiers. Knowing that he could not run, he threw the letter into the grass and approached the soldier who called him. The documents provided by Kasperavičius did not raise any suspicions; Kasperavičius said that he is a furnace maker. Having believed the partisan, the soldiers allowed him to go his own way. However other soldiers immediately found the letter in the grass with Šilui (for Šilas) written on it. The soldiers decided to take the stranger to the headquarters in Eržvilkas. Locked up in a cell, he continued to pretend to be an illiterate brick-layer. Local agents didn't extort any information and instead sent Kasperavičius to interrogators in Tauragė. There, one NKVD agent immediately drew attention to his hands, which were white, not appealing to the appearance of a mason. Kasperavičius did not lose his temper and explained that the hands of all masons are so - the clay of the ovens scrubs the hands white, and the marks are eaten away by the lime. However, the agents resorted to inserting in Kasperavičius's cell a man who had actually tasted the bread of a mason. To the great surprise of the agents, the man confirmed after a few hours of conversation that the arrested person is indeed a mason, as he knows more about furnaces than he himself. This allowed the partisan to escape capture.

Kasperavičius intended to unite the partisan units operating in Tauragė, Raseiniai, Jurbarkas, Šiauliai, Joniškis, parts of the Kėdainiai and Kaunas counties into one partisan district. Kasperavičius met with the local leadership extensively to coordinate the establishment of a military disitrct and its domestic organization. The Kęstutis military district was founded on 12 September 1946, and on the same day, Kasperavičius (then codename Angis, later changed to Visvydas), was elected as the head of the district. In a meeting of the partisan leaders that took place in 1947, Kasperavičius wrote a speech in which he emphasized the need to restore a unified underground resistance, and at his suggestion, the partisans were officially called freedom fighters (LLKS). He accented the need for partisans to fight rather than to live legal lives.

=== Death ===
After MGB agent Juozas Markulis "Erelis" failed to locate the headquarters of the district by persuading one of the representatives of the headquarters for a meeting inside, the intensity of anti-partisan agents increased. Kasperavičius planned to relocate the headquarters after Easter but failed, as the location was betrayed much sooner, and MVD soldiers and agents began surrounding the old bunker. Kasperavičius and his colleague engaged in a firefight, and to avoid capture blew themselves up. They also attempted to burn important documents, but failed to significantly destroy them, and as such much of the district's newly formed leadership was discovered and eliminated. The bodies of Kasperavičius and his colleague were buried in the yard of Šubertinė, the NKVD headquarters building in Tauragė (now a museum).

== Remembrance ==
At the meeting of partisan commanders in 1949, Kasperavičius was honored with the highest partisan award - the honorary name of "Freedom Fighter", and was awarded the 1st degree Cross of the Fight for Freedom. In 1991 a cross (and in 1993 - a monument) was erected at the place where Kasperavičius died. The homestead of Kasperavičius contains a memorial cross, built in 1995. In 1997, by the decree of Lithuania's president, Kasperavičius was awarded the Order of the Cross of Vytis, 1st degree. In 1998 he was awarded the rank of colonel. A street in Jokūbaičiai is named after him.

== See also ==
- Anti-Soviet partisans
- Forest Brothers
