= Antanas Bakšys =

Colonel Antanas Bakšys

Commander of the Kęstutis military district
- In office June 1949 – August 1952
- Preceded by: Aleksas Miliulis
- Succeeded by: Krizostomas Labanauskas

Personal details
- Born: 13 June 1923 Raseiniai, Raseiniai District Municipality, Republic of Lithuania
- Died: 17 January 1953 (aged 29) Pužukai, Kelmė District Municipality, Lithuanian SSR
- Education: Raseiniai gymnasium
- Occupation: Lithuanian partisan, teacher

Military service
- Allegiance: Lithuania
- Years of service: 1944 (Lithuanian Territorial Defense Force); 1947-1953 (Lithuanian partisans)
- Rank: Colonel (1999; posthumous)

Antanas Bakšys, also known by his codenames Klajūnas, Arvydas, Germantas, Senis (13 June 1923 – 17 January 1953) was a Lithuanian anti-Soviet partisan and a commander of the Kęstutis military district.

He was a teacher during the Soviet occupation of Lithuania. In 1944 he joined the Lithuanian Territorial Defense Force. After being detained and sent to work in the coal mines of Tula, he escaped to Lithuania and became a teacher again. He joined the partisan movement in 1947 and in 1949 became the leader of the Kęstutis military district. He also was a substitute leader for Jonas Žemaitis and a secretary of the Union of Lithuanian Freedom Fighters (LLKS) presidium. He established the underground Vyčiai Union, a movement dedicated to continuing Lithuanian resistance under more intellectual means. He died on 17 January 1953 as the location of his headquarters was discovered by Soviet agents.

== Biography ==
=== Early life ===
Antanas Bakšys was born in the town of Raseiniai to a family of a shoemaker and seamstress. From childhood Bakšys was staunchly anti-Polish (due to their occupation of Vilnius). He attended the Raseiniai gymnasium and received his matura in 1941.

=== World War II ===
During the German occupation, he worked as a secretary to the head of Raseiniai County. In 1944, he joined General Plechavičius' short-lived Lithuanian Territorial Defense Force. When the USSR re-occupied Lithuania he lived with his parents in the village of Anžiliai. From October 1944, he worked as a teacher in the Gervinė village, and from December in the Minioniai primary school. On 4 March 1945, he was arrested and imprisoned in Germany. However, the legal case did not proceed and Bakšys was instead sent to work in the mines of the Moscow region coal basin in Tula. In the summer of 1946 Bakšys along with four other Lithuanians successfully escaped to Lithuania on foot and via transport trains. In Lithuania, they took refuge in a doctor's home in Raseiniai. He successfully obtained a passport and started to teach in the Raseiniai gymnasium. There he taught art, physical education, geography and mathematics. Various partisan communicators would visit him. A former student remembers him as a light-hearted, humorous and compassionate teacher.

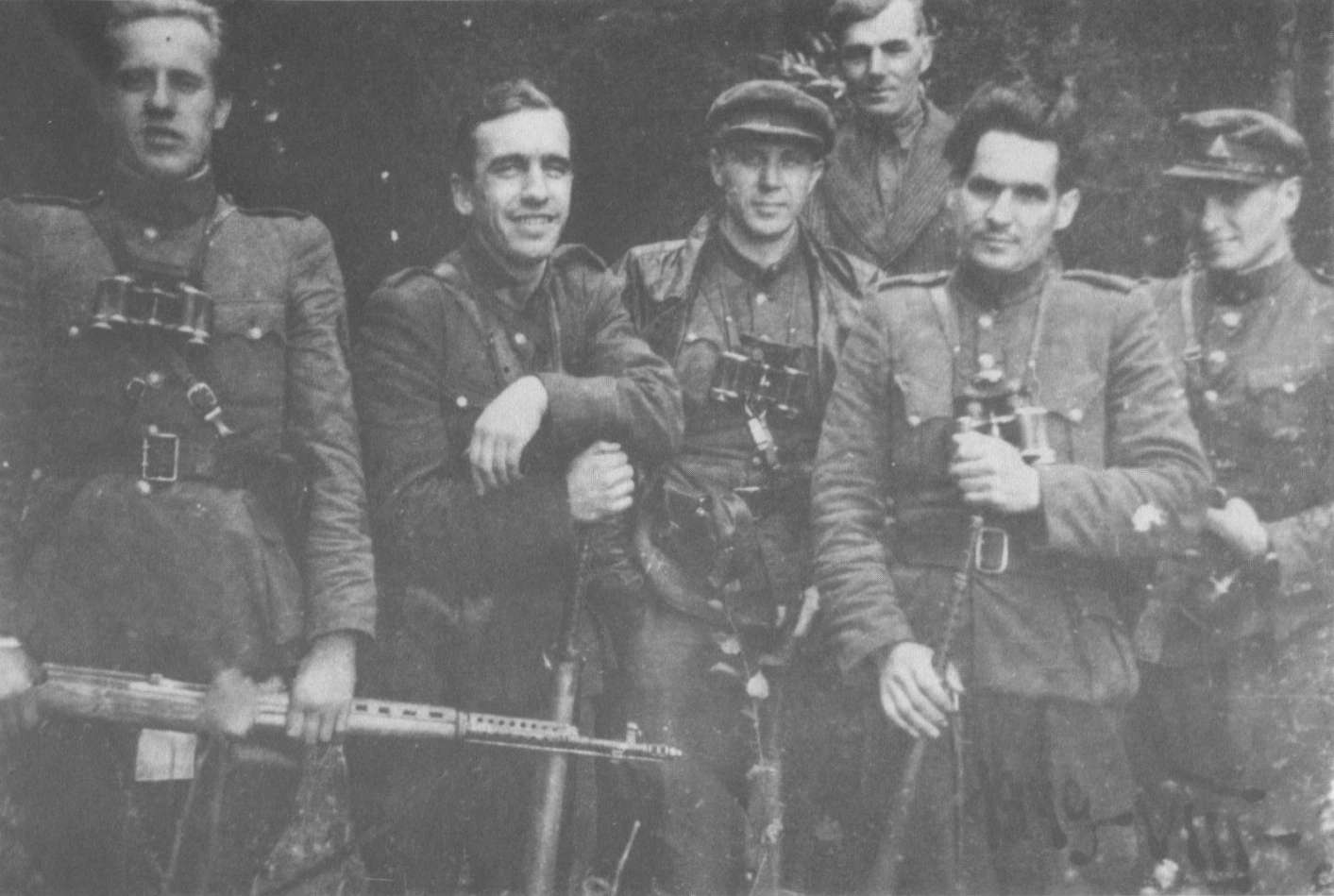
Kęstutis district commander and LLKS secretary Antanas Bakšys (standing second from left)

=== Anti-Soviet partisan ===
In 1947 Bakšys was arrested again. Bakšys was soon released, but could not stand a life of constant persecution and surveillance, and as such joined the Kęstutis military district. As Bakšys was older and more experienced, he was selected as the commander of the Vaidotas Territorial Unit. Due to his artistic competence, he was head of the unit's information division. The unit was destroyed in 1949 along with its leader Juozas Čeponis-Tauragis, and the district's headquarters fell as well when its previous leader Aleksas Miliulis died. Thereafter, Bakšys shortly became the district's leader. He strictly enforced discipline and prohibited alcohol drinking. In 1951, he became the leader of the partisan Western Lithuanian region. Bakšys was cautious as the partisan movement was already gradually weakening by the time Bakšys was the commander. He constantly switched deployment locations and avoided meeting partisan communicators. Despite that, Bakšys often inspected his partisans and maintained connections to the Union of Lithuanian Freedom Fighters president and partisan Jonas Žemaitis. When Žemaitis was sick, Bakšys wrote to other leaders to discuss potential new leadership candidates. Later on, he was appointed as Žemaitis' substitute and secretary of the presidium.

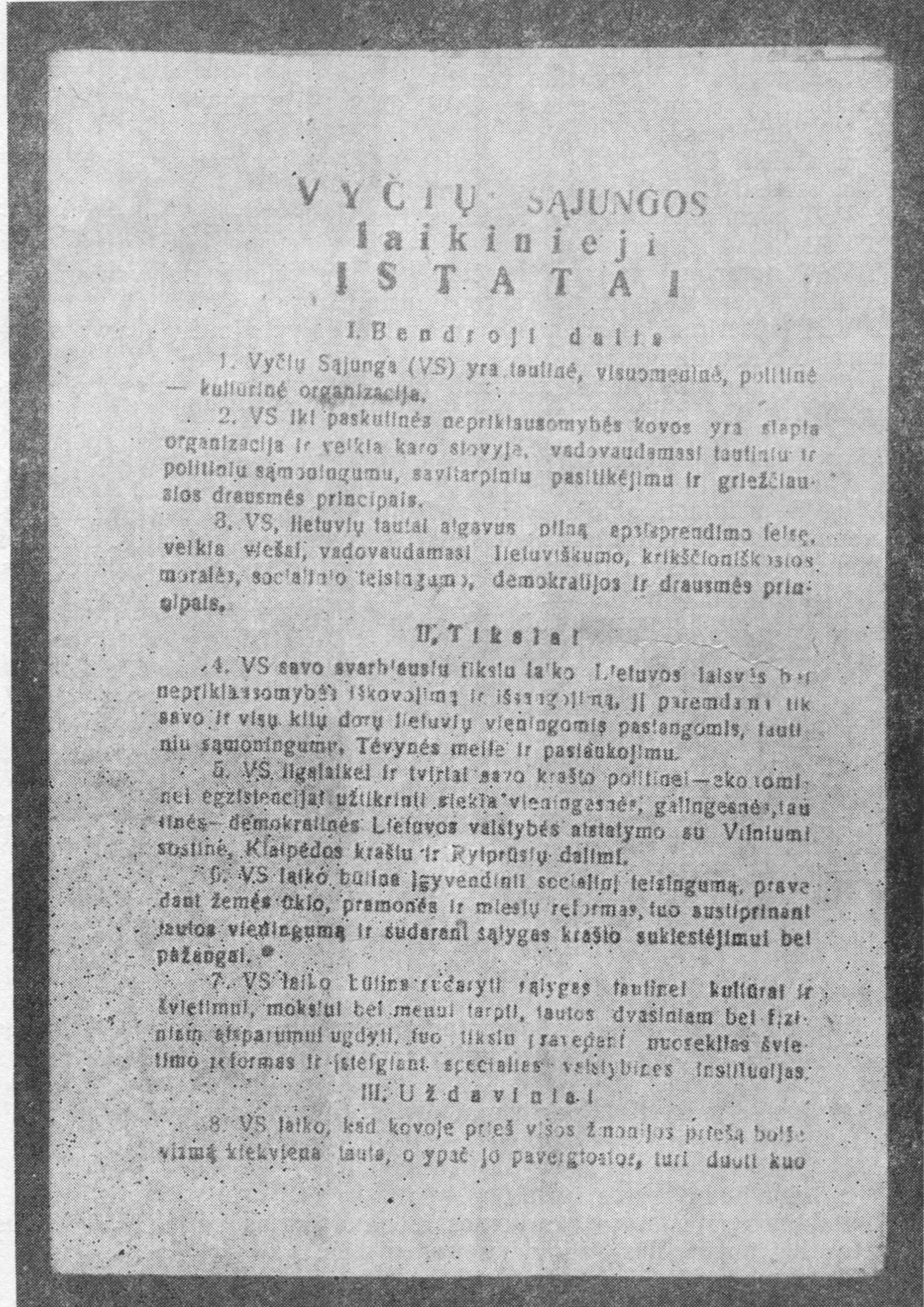
Cover page of the Vytis Union statute. It contains 50 points explaining future agricultural, industrial and educational reforms.

=== Establishment of the Vyčiai Union ===
Besides his duties as commander, Bakšys also actively printed newspapers like Laisvės Varpas. He searched for alternative methods of resistance as he realized armed resistance of the partisans was becoming weaker and that the movement must incorporate intellectual means. Bakšys consequently established the Vyčiai Union (Vyčių Sąjunga) in 1952. A newspaper entitled Vyčių Keliu was established as well. The union was meant to retain the traditions of the LLKS and to unite legally living resistance members as well as partisans. Each group of active partisans was given the order to establish local unions, however, it was relatively difficult as there was intense anti-partisan activity and the resistance itself was much weaker than before, and consequently, the union could not establish significant influence. The Union's 1952 program, based on Lithuania's 1922 constitution, stated that "the further goal of the struggle is the defense of the nation's right to decide its own future destiny by choosing a new order and structure of the government apparatus and ensuring the conditions for rapid democratic cultural progress". The union's statute also marks Lithuania's right to the regions of Vilnius, Klaipėda and part of Prussia. It also contained future industrial, agricultural, and educational reforms. The largest farms were supposed to be 30ha, and other lands would be confiscated in an attempt to fund small landowners and landless people. Education until 8th grade would be necessary, and importance would be placed on national culture and Christian values. The union was dissolved after Bakšys's death.

=== Death ===
The headquarters of the Western Lithuanian region at the time was established in the village of Pužukai. A partisan communicator revealed the possible area in which Bakšys's headquarters were situated. The location was discovered after NKVD followed a communicator by the name of Antanas Jankauskas-Tonis. The NKVD forces surrounded the hideout and after the firefight, Bakšys, as well as Aleksas Jurkūnas-Valeras, Elena Gendrolytė-Balanda and Antanas Jankauskas-Tonis, who were in the hideout, shot themselves to avoid capture. The headquarters were subsequently destroyed. His and his colleagues' bodies were buried in Kelmė.

== Decorations ==
In 1998 he was awarded the Order of the Cross of Vytis, 2nd degree, as well as promoted to the rank of colonel.

== See also ==
- Anti-Soviet partisans
- Forest Brothers

== Bibliography ==
- Gaškaitė, Nijolė (2006). Pasipriešinimo Istorija (in Lithuanian). AIDAI. ISBN 9955-656-32-8.
- Jakimavičius, Eugenijus (1996). Kovojanti Lietuva (1944-1953) (PDF) (in Lithuanian). Vilnius. ISBN 9986-824-00-1.
- Kordušienė, Loreta (2019-02-24). "Pasirašytai LLKS deklaracijai 70 metų". Raseinių Krašto Istorijos Muziejus (in Lithuanian).
- Kuodytė, Dalia (1993). "Vyčių Sąjunga". Laisvės Kovų Archyvas (in Lithuanian). 7.
- LGGRTC (2003-03-24). "50-osios Jūros srities štabo žūties metinės". genocid.lt (in Lithuanian). Archived from the original on 2003-05-01.
- Pocius, Antanas, ed. (2015). Kęstučio Apygardos Vadai (in Lithuanian). Kaunas: LGGRTC. ISBN 978-609-8037-56-2.
- Trimonienė, Rūta (2013). "Antanas Bakšys - Germantas, Klajūnas, Senis 1923 06 13–1953 01 17" (PDF). LGGRTC (in Lithuanian). Archived (PDF) from the original on 2015-04-17.
- Tutlys, Sigitas (2018-06-12). "Antanas Bakšys". vle.lt (in Lithuanian).
