= Kęstutis military district =

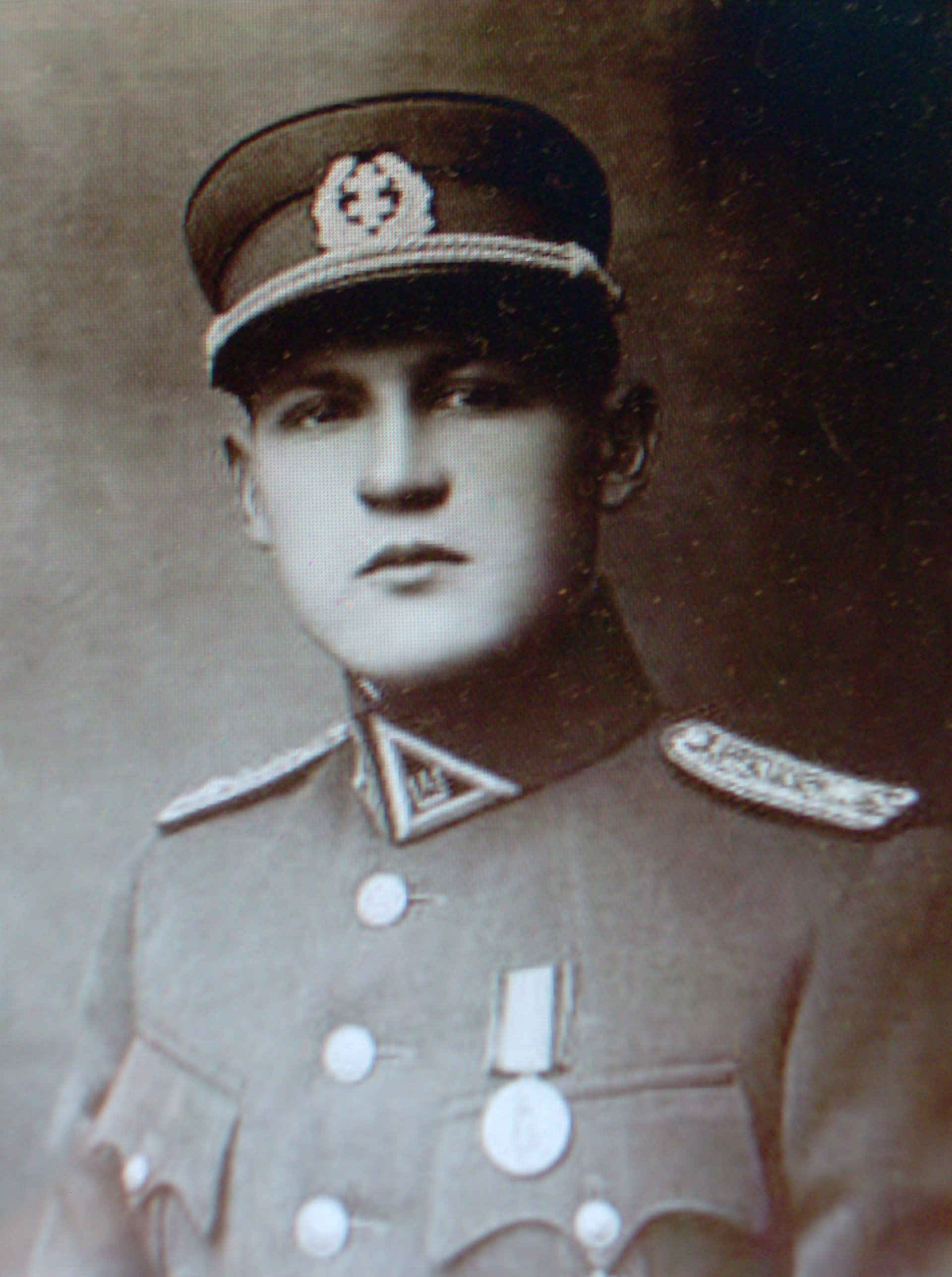
Jonas Žemaitis, Chairman of the Union of Lithuanian Freedom Fighters, Posthumously recognized President of Lithuania in March 2009, was the second commander of the Kęstutis military district.

The Kęstutis military district (Lithuanian: Kęstučio apygarda, previously Joint Kęstutis military district; Jungtinė Kęstučio apygarda) was a military district of Lithuanian partisans which operated from 1946 to 1959 in the counties of Tauragė, Raseiniai, Jurbarkas, Šiauliai, Joniškis, partially - Kėdainiai and Kaunas. The military district was named after the Grand Duke of Lithuania Kęstutis, and consisted of three units named Vaidotas, Birutė, Butigeidis. The district was home to some notable partisans, such as Jonas Žemaitis and Juozas Kasperavičius (its founder). The Union of Lithuanian Freedom Fighters was established in the area of the military district. (Note: See: Lithuanian Partisans Declaration of February 16, 1949)

== History ==
=== Formation ===
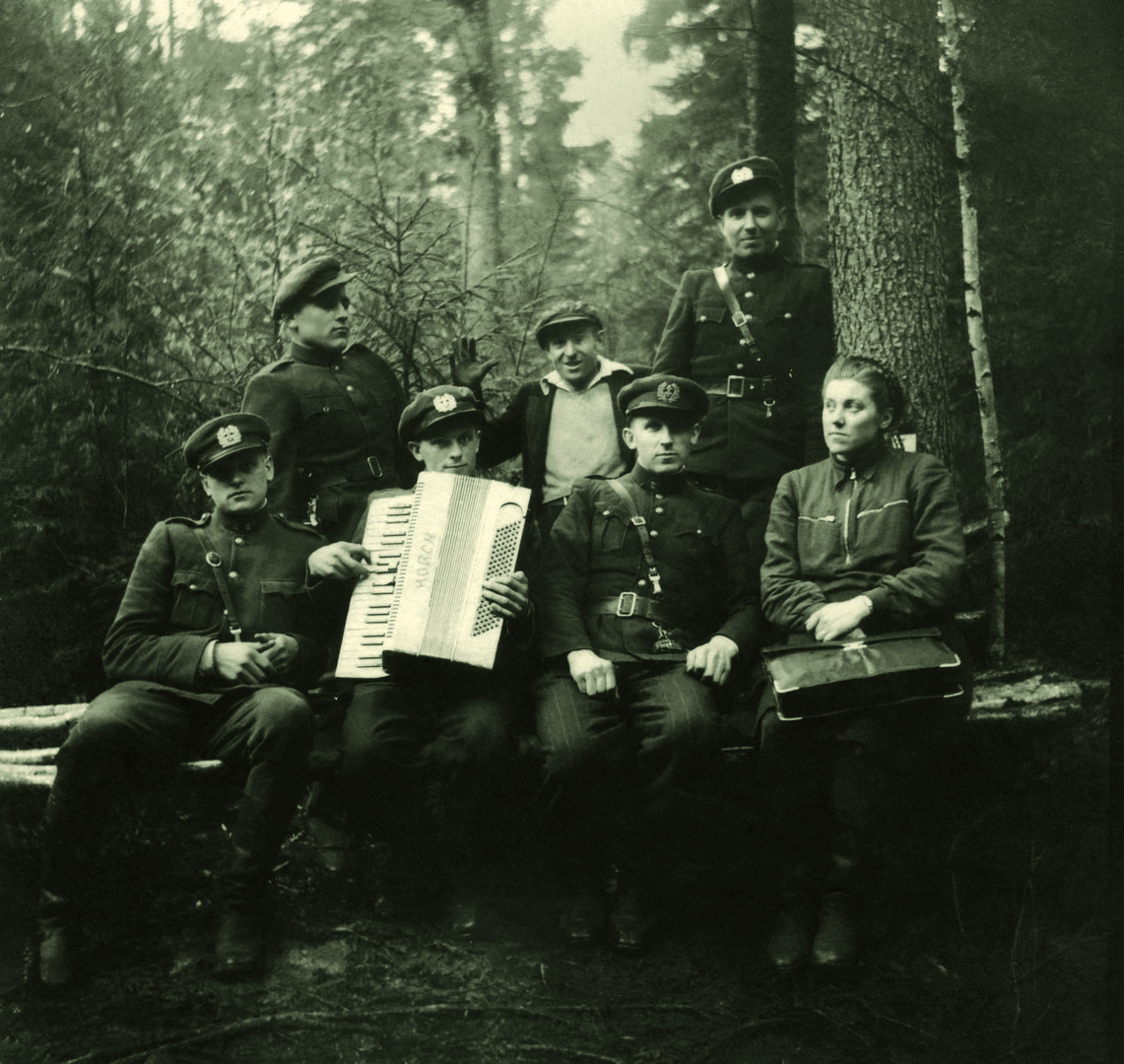
Partisans of the district in 1950

The retreating German front in the Second World War created cells of resistance in Lithuania. Resistance in the Žemaitija region began later than in other areas of Lithuania due to the span of the front. Two notable organisations emerged - the Lithuanian Front and the Lithuanian Liberty Army (LLA). The Lithuanian Front was the continuation of the Lithuanian Activist Front. It specialized in unarmed resistance and also if it was necessary, preparation for armed resistance. In 1943 the Lithuanian Front merged with other resistance organizations into the Supreme Committee for the Liberation of Lithuania (VLIK). From 1944 the Lithuanian Front assisted in creating the Lithuanian Territorial Defense Force led by general Povilas Plechavičius. Unlike the Lithuanian Front, the LLA had its own organized armed groups and battle plans, thus making them generally more fit for partisan warfare, along with it being more influential than its counterpart. However, despite this, both organizations cooperated deeply. In July 1944 the leadership of the LLA gave the order to stay in Lithuania and organise resistance. Resistance was still in the process of being organised, and in some cases experienced difficulties. For example in the battle of Virtukai of 15 July 1945, which took three hours, the partisans experienced significant losses. The summer of that year brought hardships to the newly organised resistance movements which forced the partisans to reorganise their structure. Local units such as the Žebenkštis and Lydis units played an important part in the formation. The latter, which was created in 1945, was one of the strongest units, which eventually made up the base of the future military district.

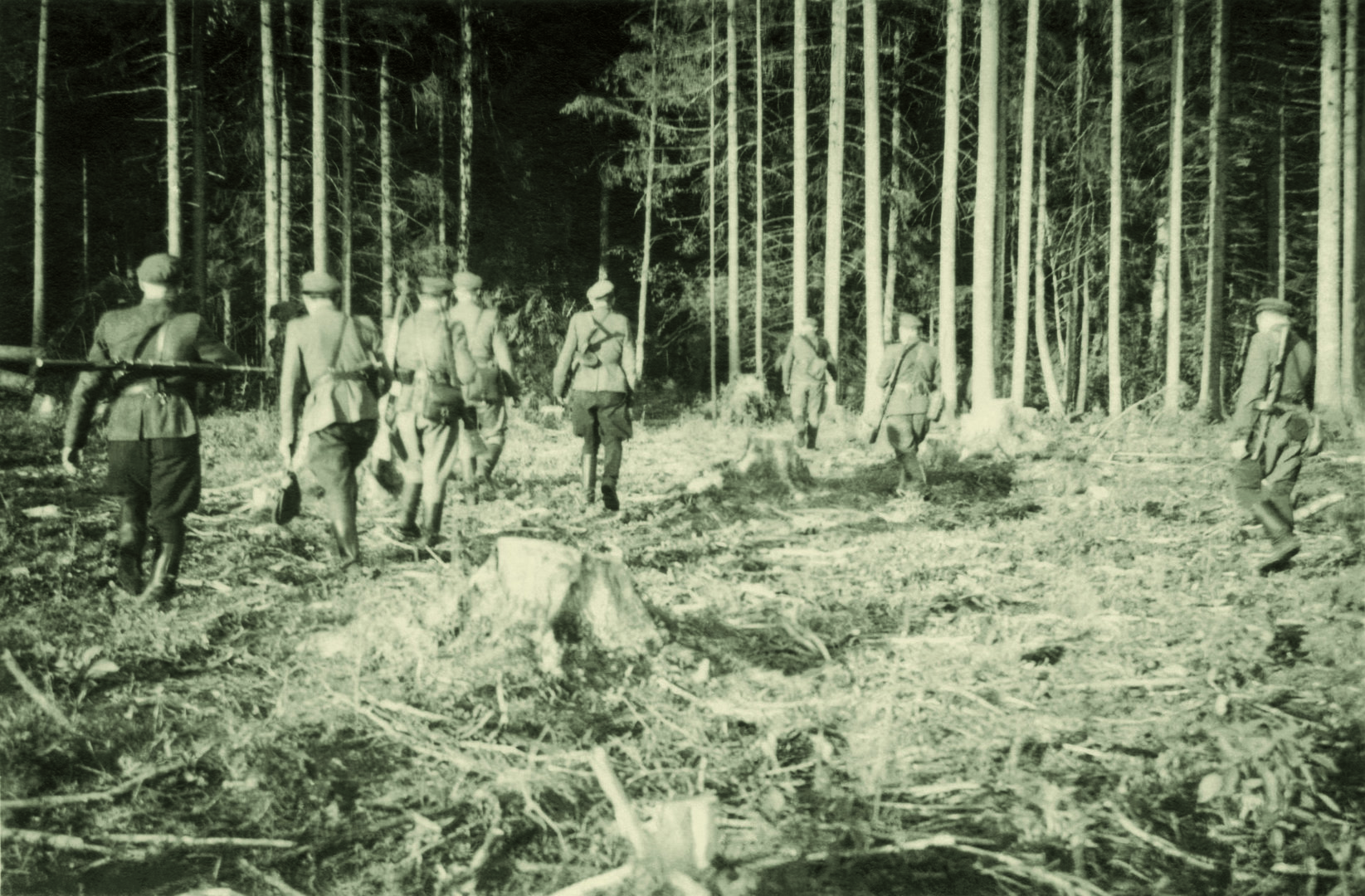
Partisans of the district in 1949

The Kęstutis military district was formed as the Joint Kęstutis Military District on 12 September 1946 from the Lydis, Žaltys, Šernas (previously - Žebenkštis), and other local units. Pilot and officer Juozas Kasperavičius was elected as its first leader. Much effort was put into establishing contacts with partisans districts from the rest of Lithuania. The district suffered a heavy setback when two of its headquarters were destroyed, one of which was hiding Juozas Kasperavičius, who died in the attacks. Kasperavičius already expressed the idea of unified partisan leadership in a letter he sent to a meeting of the district's leadership. In April 1948 the district was renamed to the Kęstutis military district.

=== Organisation ===
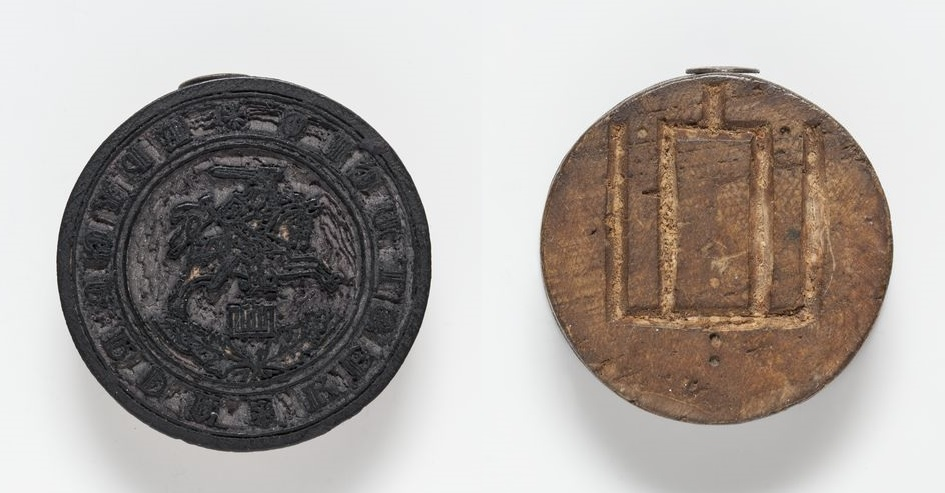
Seal of the Kęstutis military district with Vytis and Columns of Gediminas

Jonas Žemaitis, a local of the military district, rose to the ranks to become its leader after Kasperavičius's death. Žemaitis was responsible for re-organizing the partisans after the destruction of the headquarters. In 1948, the six units of the district were reorganised – three units (Birutė, Lydis, Vaidotas) made up the core of the district; whereas, three others (Voverė, Atžalynas, Juozapavičius) were transferred to the Prisikėlimas military district. By this time, the district maintained well-connected relations with other districts. The leaders of the Kęstutis district, maintaining a rise of intellectual and armed resistance, eventually took the initiative and began to form centralized leadership of the Lithuanian partisans. On 8 May 1948, the West Lithuanian (Sea) area was established, unifying the three partisan districts of Žemaitija, with Žemaitis becoming the area's immediate leader. On 8 June, he transferred leadership to Aleksandras Milaševičius. The headquarters also prepared documents which included teaching methods of new recruits as well as mobilization plans. The district was the strongest of the three in its area.

=== Leadership ===
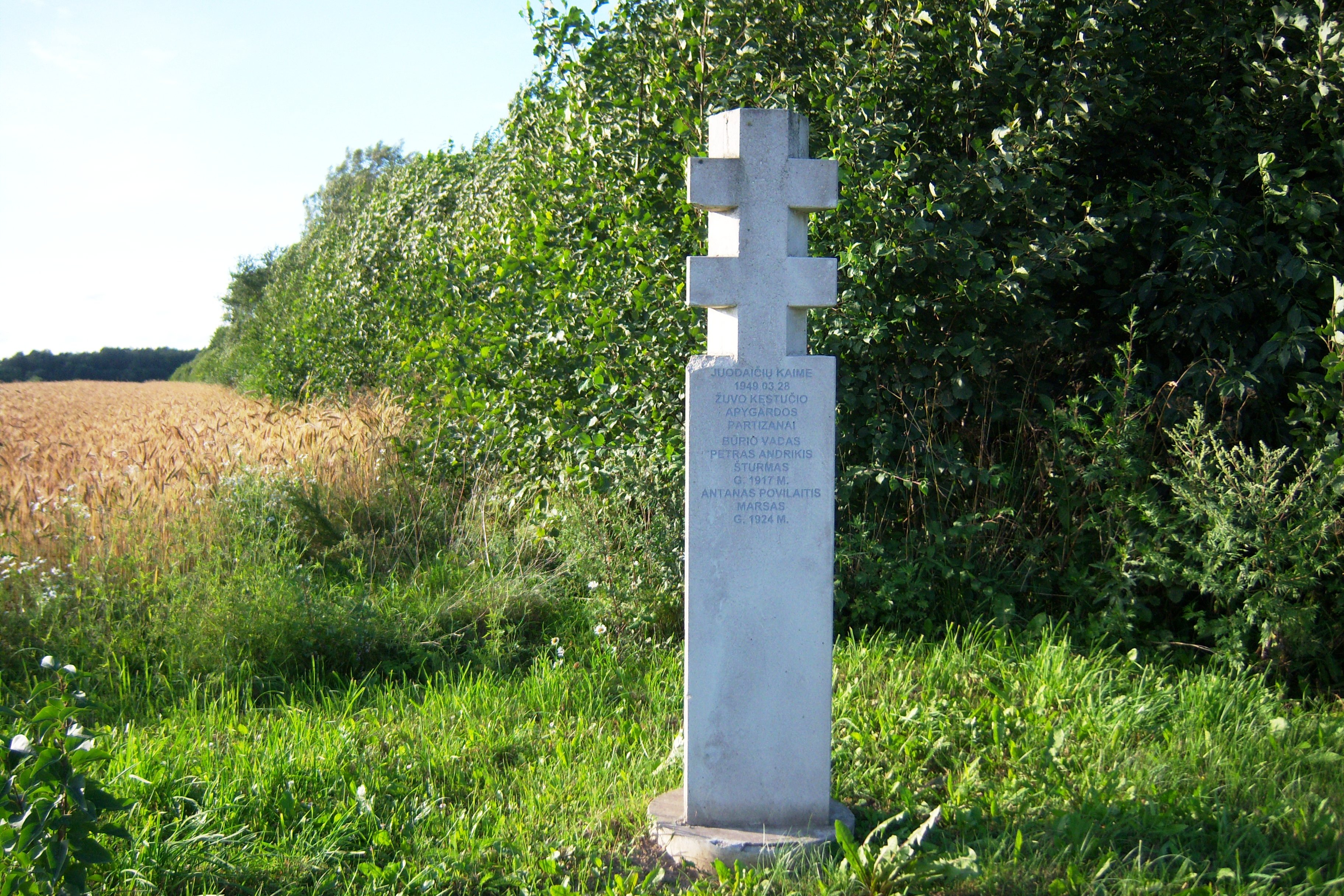
A monument to perished partisans of the Kęstutis military district

The headquarters of the district was established in July 1948, with its new commander being chosen as Henrikas Danilevičius. The headquarters was situated around Eržvilkas in three bunkers. Two bunkers actively printed newspapers. When Danilevičius went to Kaunas to visit his wife, he was ambushed by agents but escaped. The headquarters consequently punished Danilevičius by removing him from his post. Suspicions about him being a KGB agent did not suffice, and instead he was sent to eastern Lithuania as a representative of the western partisans. Despite his somewhat tumultuous career, Danilevičius remained loyal to the end and died fighting in 1949. Danilevičius was replaced by Aleksas Miliulis, a former leader of the Butigeidis unit. He reformed the district so as to make its communications more confidential. In June 1949 Miliulis was killed by MGB agents, and the headquarters of the district was completely destroyed. Another notable leader is Antanas Bakšys, who established the Vyčiai Union - an organization dedicated to fighting under intellectual means as the partisan movement was gradually weakening. The district ceased to exist in 1953 when its last commander, Jonas Vilčinskas, was killed. The last partisans of the district died 4 May 1959.

== Leaders ==
Name	Nom de guerre	Since	Until	Notes
Juozas Kasperavičius	Šilas, Angis, Visvydas	1946 September 12	1947 April 9	Died in the line of duty. Interwar Lithuanian pilot.
Jonas Žemaitis	Vytautas	1947 May	1948 July 8	General of the partisans.
Henrikas Danilevičius	Vidmantas, Danila, Kerštas, Žinys, Algis	1948 July 8	1949 April	Died in the line of duty.
Aleksas Miliulis	Neptūnas, Algimantas	1949 April	1949 8 June	Died in the line of duty.
Antanas Bakšys	Klajūnas, Germantas	1949 June	1952 August	Died in the line of duty. Creator of the Vyčiai union.
Krizostomas Labanauskas	Justas	1951 August	1952 May	
Povilas Morkūnas	Rimantas, Drakas	1952 May 20	1953 June 19	Died in the line of duty.
Jonas Vilčinskas	Algirdas, Svajūnas	1953 June 19	1953 September 19	Died in the line of duty. District ceased to exist.

== Structure of Lithuanian partisans' organisation ==
LLKS
Western Lithuania (Jūra) region	Southern Lithuania (Nemunas) region	Eastern Lithuania (King Mindaugas) region
Žemaičiai military district	Prisikėlimas military district	Kęstutis military district	Tauras military district	Dainava military district	Algimantas military district	Vytautas military district	Vytis military district	Didžioji Kova military district
Alka	Maironis	Vaidotas	Vytautas	Dzūkai	Žalioji	Tigras	Krikštaponis
Šatrija	Duke Žvelgaitis	Birutė	Žalgiris	Šarūnas	Šarūnas	Liūtas	Briedis
Kardas	Juozapavičius	Butageidis	Geležinis vilkas	Kazimieraitis	Duke Margiris	Lokys
Lietuvos žalioji
