= Fortūnatas Ašoklis =

Lithuanian partisan leader (1918–1946)

Commander of the Žemaičiai military district
- In office 15 April 1946 – 21 September 1946
- Preceded by: Jonas Semaška
- Succeeded by: Kazimieras Antanavičius

Personal details
- Born: 3 May 1907 Raudoniai, Kovno Governorate, Russian Empire
- Died: 21 September 1946 (aged 39) Telšiai, Lithuanian SSR, Soviet Union
- Occupation: Lithuanian partisan

Military service
- Allegiance: Lithuania 1944-1946 (Lithuanian Liberty Army)

Fortūnatas Ašoklis, also known by his codenames Pelėda, Vilkas, Jonas, Silkoša (3 May 1907 – 21 September 1946) was a Lithuanian anti-Soviet partisan commander in the region of Samogitia, as well as a commander of the newly founded Žemaičiai military district.

After studying at the Klaipėda trade institute, Ašoklis directed the Ylakiai farm from 1942 to 1944. He joined the Lithuanian Liberty Army (LLA) in 1944 and began organizing men for anti-Soviet resistance, joining the Samogitian Legion headed by Jonas Semaška. After his death, Ašoklis assumed leadership of the legion, and in 1946 it merged with the LLA, being renamed the Žemaičiai military district. Ašoklis was arrested in 1946 and tortured to death in a prison in Telšiai.

== Biography ==
Fortūnatas Ašoklis was born on 3 May 1907 in the village of Raudoniai in the Skuodas district of Lithuania. He studied at the Klaipėda trade institute. During Operation Barbarossa, Ašoklis headed the Ylakiai valsčius (county) from 1942 to 1944.

In 1944 he joined the Lithuanian Liberty Army and began organizing men for anti-Soviet resistance. He headed a unit of the local Samogitian Legion. On 5 October 1945 he was made head of the Legion's headquarters. On 18 October he was appointed head of the reconnaissance and supply division. In 1946 the headquarters of the Legion, with the help of Jonas Noreika, prepared a detailed plan for an uprising that would encompass all of Lithuania, which would be implemented in the event of a military conflict between western countries and the USSR. As the headquarters lacked sufficient staffing, Jonas Semaška and Ašoklis reformed the partisan districts in Samogitia and established headquarters in Šiauliai. After the death of Semeška, Ašoklis immediately assumed leadership. He established the Kardas, Alkas, and Šatrija units. On 12 April 1946 the Samogitian Legion was incorporated in the LLA and renamed to the Žemaičiai district. On 17 April Ašoklis became its commander. He signed the district documents under the pseudonym of Mindaugas.

On 19 September 1946 Ašoklis was arrested by the MGB, and subsequently was imprisoned in Telšiai. He died on 21 September 1946, either due to torture or suicide.

In 2004 was awarded the Cross of Vytis.

== See also ==
- Anti-Soviet partisans
- Forest Brothers
