= Jonas Vilčinskas =

Anti-Soviet Lithuanian partisan (1930–1953)

Colonel Jonas Vilčinskas

Commander of the Kęstutis military district
- In office 19 June 1953 – 19 September 1953
- Preceded by: Povilas Morkūnas

Personal details
- Born: 23 February 1930 Paantvardys, Jurbarkas District Municipality, Republic of Lithuania
- Died: 19 September 1953 (aged 23) Antanava, Raseiniai District Municipality, Lithuanian SSR
- Education: Jurbarkas gymnasium
- Occupation: Lithuanian partisan

Military service
- Allegiance: Lithuania
- Years of service: 1949–1953 (Lithuanian partisans)
- Rank: Colonel (1998; posthumous)

Jonas Vilčinskas, also known by his codenames Algirdas and Svajūnas (23 February 1930 – 19 September 1953) was an anti-Soviet Lithuanian partisan and the last commander of their Kęstutis military district.

== Biography ==
=== Early life ===
Jonas Vilčinskas was born on 23 February 1930 in the village of Paantvardys in the Jurbarkas district to peasants Kazimieras Vilčinskas and Pranciška Barčytė. He graduated from the Jurbarkas gymnasium in 1948 and attempted to achieve higher education, however as the son of a kulak he was unsuccessful in doing so. He worked at an editorial office in the Šakiai district. Vilčinskas wished to be a teacher.

=== Partisan activity ===
During the Soviet re-occupation of Lithuania Vilčinskas was a partisan communicator. When his parents were deported in 1949, as well as getting the call to join the Soviet army, Vilčinskas joined the resistance and became a partisan in the Mindaugas group, belonging to the Vaidotas unit, which in turn belonged to the Kęstutis military district. In the same year he became the leader of the Vaidotas unit. Additionally, Vilčinskas became a communicator for Jonas Žemaitis. By 1951 he was staff of the military district's headquarters, and on 6 December 1951 he became head of staff. Moreover, he was also at one point a staff member of the partisan West Lithuanian (Sea) Area. When its leader Antanas Bakšys died, Vilčinskas assumed most of the responsibility. He and the new commander of the district Povilas Morkūnas continued to publish newspapers, as well as re-establishing lost connections to other partisan districts. On 19 June 1953 Vilčinskas became the commander of the Kęstutis military district after the death of Morkūnas.

=== Leadership and final years ===
Vilčinskas and Žemaitis were under the same impression that relations with Western countries must be established after the fall of the district's headquarters. Žemaitis allowed Vilčinskas to attempt to cross the border and hopefully reach the West. He intended to reach the Supreme Committee for the Liberation of Lithuania (VLIK) and establish contacts with communication points abroad. However, these plans were stalled as a partisan by the name of Klemensas Širvis, who helped establish contact between Vilčinskas and Žemaitis, was found to be already recruited by Soviet agents. Vilčinskas decided to cross the borders of the USSR with the help of a couple of colleagues, one of which was a Soviet agent by the codename of Vaidila, intent on capturing Vilčinskas. Jonas Vilčinskas was eventually lured in the town of Antanava of the Raseiniai district by Soviet agents and recruited former partisans to a false meeting, and then on 19 September 1953 he was shot. The Kęstutis military district ceased to exist after his death.

== Remembrance ==
In 1999 he was awarded the Order of the Cross of Vytis, 3rd degree. He was also awarded the rank of colonel in the same year.

== See also ==
- Anti-Soviet partisans
- Forest Brothers
