= Aleksas Miliulis =

Lithuanian partisan

Colonel Aleksas Miliulis
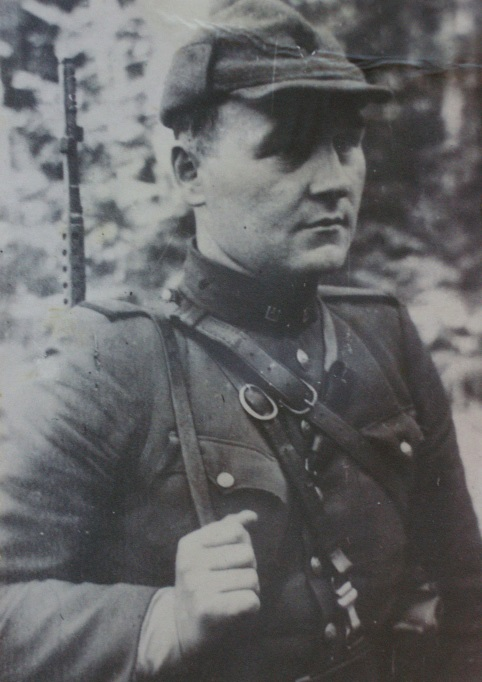

Commander of the Kęstutis military district
- In office April 1949 – 8 June 1949
- Preceded by: Henrikas Danilevičius
- Succeeded by: Antanas Bakšys

Personal details
- Born: 1923 Batakiai, Tauragė District Municipality, Republic of Lithuania
- Died: 8 June 1949 (aged 25–26) Kaziškė forest, Tauragė District Municipality, Lithuanian SSR
- Occupation: Lithuanian partisan

Military service
- Allegiance: Lithuania
- Years of service: 1946-1949 (Lithuanian partisans)
- Rank: Captain (pre-partisan); Colonel (1998; posthumous)

Aleksas Miliulis, also known by his codenames Neptūnas or Algimantas (1923 – 8 June 1949) was a Lithuanian partisan and a commander of the Kęstutis military district. In addition to being a partisan, he was also a teacher and a captain in the Lithuanian interwar army. From 1946 he was a part of the Kęstutis military district, and in 1949 was chosen as its short-lived leader.

== Biography ==
Aleksas or Aleksandras Miliulis was born in 1923 in the town of Batakiai in the Tauragė district. He was a captain in the Lithuanian army in the interwar period as well as a teacher in the villages of Budviečiai and later Purvėnai. He taught English. Later on he became a soldier in the Lithuanian Liberty Army. In 1945 he organized his first partisan group near Žygaičiai. In 1946 he substituted a partisan company of the Kęstutis military district. After a few months, he became the head of the company's propaganda sector, and in 1948 he was chosen leader of his own subdivision of the military district. During this period Miliulis succeeded in establishing the underground organization Raketa in Tauragė, whose members included employees of Soviet repressive structures. In April of 1949, he was appointed commander of the military district, as the previous commander Henrikas Danilevičius left for Kaunas.

During Miliulis's tenure, the military district increased its capabilities of integrity and confidentiality, however, the location of the short-lived fourth headquarters of the military district was revealed shortly. MGB agent under the codename Platonas successfully pretended to be captain in the Lithuanian army, after which he set up a meeting with the leadership in the forest of Kaziškė. Miliulis died on 8 June 1949 in the ensuing fight, along with others. Their bodies were displayed in Šubertine, an NKVD interrogation headquarters in Tauragė. They are believed to be buried in its yard.

== Remembrance ==
He was posthumously awarded the rank of colonel in 1998. The following year in 1999 he was awarded the Order of the Cross of Vytis.

== See also ==
- Anti-Soviet partisans
- Forest Brothers
