= Kubilius =

- Lithuanian surname
- m.: Kubilius
- f.: (unmarried): Kubiliūtė
- f.: (married): Kubilienė
- Origin: occupation of cooper

Kubilius is a Lithuanian language family name, literally meaning "the cooper". It may refer to:

- Adolfas Kubilius (1918–1946), Lithuanian anti-Soviet partisan
- Andrius Kubilius (born 1956), Lithuanian politician
- Jonas Kubilius (1921–2011), Lithuanian mathematician, former rector of Vilnius University
- Marcelė Kubiliūtė (1898–1963), Lithuanian public figure
- Vytautas Kubilius (1928–2004), Lithuanian literary critic and political activist
- Walter Kubilius (1918–1993), American science fiction writer
