= Edmundas Malūkas =

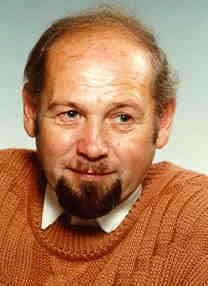
- Born: Edmundas Zenonas Malūkas; 15 April 1945 (age 81); Ylakiai, Lithuania
- Citizenship: Lithuanian
- Education: Lithuanian University of Health Sciences
- Occupation: Writer
- Children: Mantas Malūkas, Agnas Malūkas, Joris Malūkas
- Writing career
- Genres: Non-fiction novel; Historical romance; Romance novel
- Subjects: Mafia; Narrative history; Crime

Edmundas Zenonas Malūkas (born 15 April 1945) is a Lithuanian writer, published author and politician. He is also the former mayor of Trakai, a historic city and lake resort in Lithuania.

== Published work ==
Edmundas Malūkas is one of the most critically acclaimed and commercially successful Lithuanian writers of his generation. His first four novels were bestsellers, and more than 492,000 copies of his books are in print. He also writes screenplays for motion pictures and television shows.

== Bibliography ==
- Kraujo skonis: Crime novel. – Vilnius: Horizontas,(1992) – 286 pp.
- Juodieji želmenys: Crime novel. – Vilnius: Horizontas, (1993) – 414 pp.
- Moters kerštas: Romance novel. – Vilnius: Horizontas, (1994) – 364 pp. – ISBN 9986-506-02-6
- Šiukšlyno žmonės: Crime-romance novel. – Panevėžys: Magilė, (1995) – 302 pp. – ISBN 9986-697-01-8
- Migla: Romance. (I)(II) – Panevėžys: Magilė, (1997–1999) – ISBN 9986-9124-1-5
- Vilko duona: Novel – Panevėžys: Magilė, (1998) – 205 pp. – ISBN 9986-9124-8-2
- Duženos: Romance novel. – Panevėžys: Magilė, (2001) – 309 pp. – ISBN 9986-956-26-9
- Karalienė Barbora: Historical romance. – Panevėžys: Magilė, (2004) – 422 pp. – ISBN 9986-956-38-2
- Likimų šnekos: Romance novel – Panevėžys: Magilė, (2009) – 358 pp. – ISBN 978-9986-956-70-9
- Dilgės: Romance novel. – Panevėžys: Magilė, (2009) – 342 pp. – ISBN 978-9986-956-71-6
- Vytauto žemė: Historical romance. – Panevėžys: Magilė, 2016. – 704 pp. – ISBN 978-6098-159-20-2
