= Adolfas Kubilius =

Lithuanian partisan leader (1918–1946)

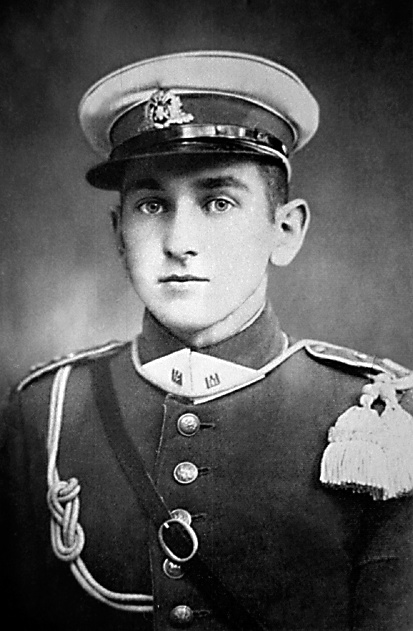
- Kubilius with uniform of the Lithuanian Armed Forces during the interwar period

Commander of the Žemaičiai military district
- In office March 1945 – 9 March 1946
- Succeeded by: Jonas Semaška

Personal details
- Born: 26 July 1918 Budriai, Kretinga district municipality, Lithuania
- Died: 9 March 1946 (aged 27) Vilnius, Lithuanian SSR, Soviet Union
- Cause of death: Execution by shooting
- Occupation: Lithuanian partisan

Military service
- Allegiance: Lithuania
- Years of service: 1940 (Lithuanian Army); 1943-1946 (Lithuanian Liberty Army)

Adolfas Kubilius (26 July 1918 – 9 March 1946), also known by his codenames Balys, Radvila, or Vaišvila, was a Lithuanian anti-Soviet partisan and a commander of partisans in the Samogitia region.

Kubilius was a teacher during interwar Lithuania. In 1940 he was conscripted into the Lithuanian army but was quickly demobilized due to the Soviet occupation of Lithuania. At the beginning of Nazi occupation of Lithuania, Kubilius studied journalism in Vytautas Magnus University, though after persecutions by the Gestapo began, he went into hiding and joined the Lithuanian Liberty Army, becoming one of its leaders, and began organizing men in Samogitia, establishing the Samogitian Legion. He was captured in 1945 and sentenced to be shot in 1946.

== Biography ==
=== Early life ===
Adolfas Kubilius was born on 26 July 1918 in the village of Budriai in the Kretinga district to Leonas Kubilius and Ona Daugintaitė. In 1936 he graduated from the Kretinga gymnasium, staying there working as a teacher afterwards. In 1940 he was conscripted into the Lithuanian army and served in a battalion of uhlan light cavalry. However, Lithuania would soon be occupied by the Soviet Union under the treatise of the Molotov–Ribbentrop Pact, and Kubilius would be demobilized in the autumn of the same year.

=== German occupation ===
Following demobilization, Kubilius set to work in the Kaunas radio broadcast service and later the Vilnius tobacco factory. Kubilius began studying journalism in the Vytautas Magnus University. After the Gestapo began persecutions, Kubilius went into hiding. In 1943 he joined the Lithuanian Liberty Army (LLA), heading its organizational communications department in the headquarters in Vilnius under the rank of captain. Kubilius took care of the distribution of the anti-Nazi press, as well as recruiting new members. In 1944 Kubilius departed for a German military-intelligence school in East Prussia under the initiative of the LLA. After completing its courses he was sent back to the forests of Lithuania.

=== Later years and death ===
Upon return, Kubilius began establishing bunkers as well as initiating communications with the LLA's Šiauliai district, as well as other partisan groups in Samogitia. Along with fellow partisan Adolfas Eidimtas he established the Samogitian Legion, a progenitor of the Žemaičiai military district. It encompassed resistance units of the LLA in the region. He took care of the acquisition of weapons, collected information about the Red Army, the as well as deployment of its military units, and the movement of equipment. The received knowledge was transmitted to Germany. Kubilius maintained relations with the bishop of Telšiai, Vincentas Borisevičius, from whom he received support by food. In 1945 Kubilius was discovered and arrested, and sent to be held in captivity in Vilnius. In January 1946 he was sentenced to be shot, and the order was carried out two months later, on 9 March 1946. His remains were buried in the vicinity of the Tuskulėnai Manor, and were re-discovered in 2004.

== See also ==
- Anti-Soviet partisans
- Forest Brothers
