= Jonas Semaška =

Lithuanian partisan leader (1907–1947)

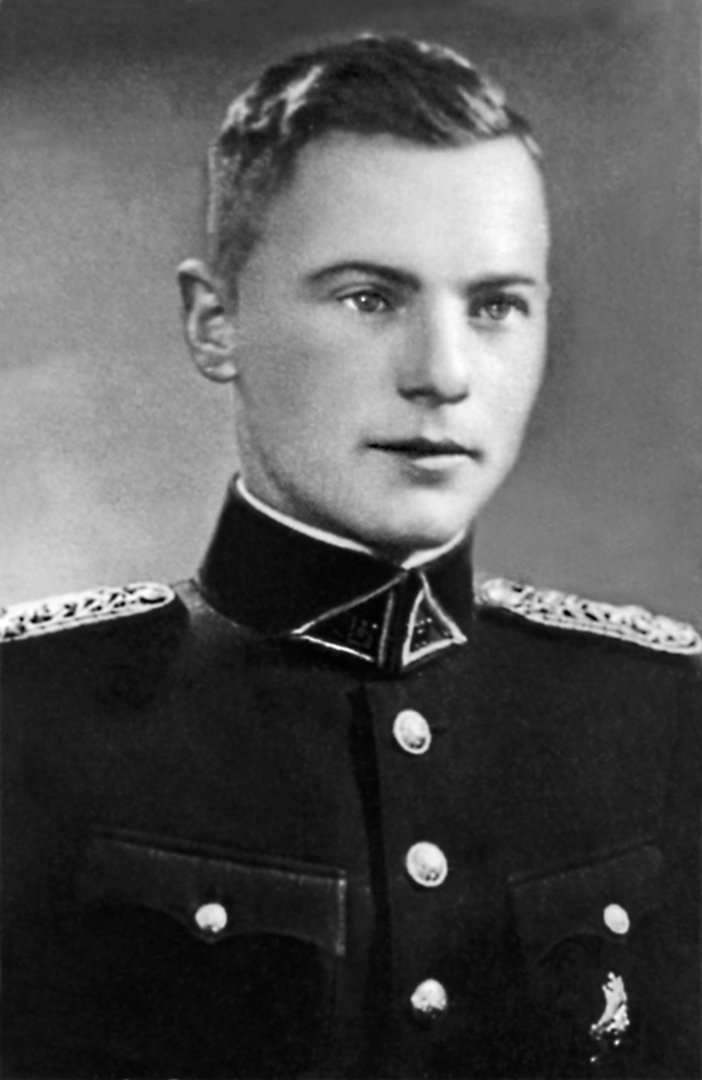

Commander of the Žemaičiai military district
- In office 9 March 1946 – 15 April 1946
- Preceded by: Adolfas Kubilius
- Succeeded by: Fortūnatas Ašoklis

Personal details
- Born: 24 November 1907 Ramygala, Kovno Governorate, Russian Empire
- Died: 21 January 1947 (aged 39) Vilnius, Lithuanian SSR, Soviet Union
- Cause of death: Execution by shooting
- Education: War School of Kaunas
- Nickname(s): Liepa, Rikis, Gaučas

Military service
- Years of service: 1928–1947
- Commands: 7th Lithuanian Police Battalion; 13th Lithuanian Police Battalion; Žemaičiai military district

Jonas Semaška, nom de guerre Liepa, Rikis, Gaučas (24 November 1907 – 21 January 1947) was a Lithuanian officer of the Lithuanian Army, as well as armed units of the Soviet Union and Nazi Germany during World War II. From 1945, Semaška was a leader of Lithuanian partisans, who fought for Lithuanian independence.

== Early life ==
Jonas Semaška was born on 24 November 1907 in Naujadvaris village, Ramygala county, Panevėžys district. He was one of ten children. Semaška graduated from the gymnasium in Panevėžys in 1928.

== Interwar ==
Jonas Semaška was drafted into the Lithuanian army on 12 September 1928. After he graduated from the 12th class of the War School of Kaunas, he was given the rank of infantry lieutenant and was assigned to the 1st Infantry Regiment's 7th Company's junior officer. On 1 January 1931, his rank was changed to junior lieutenant due to the Law on Officer Ranks.

On 17–20 June 1932, together with the honour guard Company, Semaška participated in the consecration of the monument to the fallen Lithuanian soldiers in Giedraičiai. On 27 March 1933, he completed the skier officer's course. On November 20, he was promoted to lieutenant. From 1 January 1934, he was appointed as the senior officer of the 1st Company, and then, from 1 September, the 8th Company. On 16 May 1935, he was appointed the 8th Company's commander. In addition to commanding the 8th Company, he was the instructor of the ski team of the regiment's 3rd Battalion. On 23 November 1937, he was promoted to captain.

== World War II ==
In October 1939, Semaška partook in the Lithuanian march on Vilnius.

=== First Soviet occupation (1940–1941) ===
During the Soviet occupation of Lithuania in 1940, he was still the 1st Infantry Regiment's 8th Company's commander. While the Lithuanian army was being broken up, Semaška was made company commander of the Red Army's 234th Rifle Regiment, part of the 29th Territorial Rifle Corps' 179th Rifle Division on 3 October. When the regiment's political commissar demanded that Semaška spy on the commander of his regiment, Colonel L. Rajeckas, Semaška informed Rajeckas about this. In order to avoid trouble, he was released for holidays on 15 May 1941. After returning from his holidays, he was tipped off about the coming arrest, so he went into hiding. To avoid arrest, he initially hid in Riga with the Latvian officer Mārtiņš Puriņš. Later, Semaška hid in the Marijampolė district.

=== German occupation (1941–1944) ===
From August 1941, Semaška served as company commander in the LSD's 4th Security Battalion. This unit became the 7th Battalion from 15 February 1942. Together with the battalion, commanded by Captain V. Klimavičius, Semaška was sent in April to the Vinnytsia Oblast, then in Reichskommissariat Ukraine, to protect the railways and the strategic road, the Durchgangsstrasse IV, under construction to the south.

==== Winter of 1942/43 ====
On 25 October 1942, Semaška was promoted to commander of the 7th Battalion, which was soon transferred to the front near Stalingrad. As they were part of Generalfeldmarschall Friedrich Paulus' Sixth Army, Semaška and his unit were surrounded by the Red Army. After receiving the permission of Arthur Schmidt, the Sixth Army's chief of staff, the 7th Lithuanian battalion led by Captain Jonas Semaška, broke through 3 encirclement lines. From 13 to 17 January 1943, the battalion was embroiled in Ostrogozhsk's defence, as the Soviets launched the Ostrogozhsk–Rossosh offensive. In conjunction with the few nearby Hungarian and German units, the 13th Light Division and 168th Infantry Division respectively, the Lithuanian Battalion succeeded in breaking through three defensive rings in the Alexeyevsk district. After the successful breakthrough, the battalion was withdrawn to Alytus for rest.

==== 1943–1945 ====
Later in 1943, Semaška was appointed the 13th Battalion's commander, that was also sent to the Eastern Front. The 13th Battalion fought against the Soviet army in the battles near Lake Ilmen, Pskov, Velikiye Luki. During these battles, he was wounded twice and was treated in the military hospital in Opochka.

On 1 July 1944, Jonas Semaška was promoted from captain to major. He retreated together with the Wehrmacht from Pskov towards Latvia and fought in the Courland pocket. After the capitulation of Germany on 8 May 1945, he did not surrender himself to Soviet captivity. Together with Captain Stepas Januševičius and two other liaison officers (Lithuanian: ryšininkai), Semaška returned to Lithuania while hiding at night.

== Second Soviet occupation of Lithuania ==
Semaška went specifically to the forests near Plungė and joined the Lithuanian partisans in Samogitia. From 1 August 1945, Jonas Semaška commanded the Šatrija Territorial Unit. His nom-de-guerre was Liepa (lit. translation: linden tree). In October 1945, he organized a meeting of the leaders of LLA in Samogitia, where he was elected the commander of the Žemaičiai military district and united various partisan units. By his order, the Samogitian Legion (Lithuanian: Žemaičių legionas) was recreated on 1 October 1945, which he commanded. The Legion operated in the districts of Telšiai, Tauragė, Kretinga, Šilutė, Mažeikiai and Raseiniai. Semaška successfully established contacts with the 3rd and 5th districts (Apygardos) of the LLA, as well as the Dzūkian group (Dzūkų grupė). On 15 March 1946, he met with the commander of the Lithuanian National Council, Jonas Noreika, nom-de-guerre General Storm. From Noreika, Semaška received instructions on the reorganization of the partisan units into the Lithuanian Armed Forces. Semaška also accepted the offer to command the future Lithuanian Army's Šiauliai military district.

=== Arrest and execution ===
Jonas Semaška was arrested in Telšiai on 15 April 1946. At the time, he had documents with the name Juozapas Grinkus. On 13 October 1946, by order of the Central Committee of the LSSR VKP(b) in the show trial held in Telšiai, Semaška was sentenced to death by the MVD Vilnius garrison's military tribunal. On 21 January 1947, Semaška was shot in Vilnius.

== Family ==
In 1936, Jonas Semaška married Elena Dambrauskaitė, daughter of another Lithuanian officer. Their first son, Alvydas Semaška, was born in 1938. In 1948, Semaška's family was exiled to Siberia.

== Awards ==
- Order of the Lithuanian Grand Duke Gediminas, 4th Class in 1939
- War Merit Cross 2nd Class with Swords in 1943
- Iron Cross 2nd Class in 1944
- Wound Badge in 1944
- Knight's Cross of the Iron Cross 1st Class in 1945
- Commander's Grand Cross of the Order of Vytis Cross, awarded posthumously in 1998
- On 22 May 1998, the President of Lithuania posthumously awarded the rank of colonel to Jonas Semaška by presidential decree

== Burial ==
On 20 November 1994, the bodily remains of Jonas Semaška were identified in the mass grave in Tuskulėnai Manor. On 29 September 2001, he was reburied in the Petrašiūnai Cemetery of Kaunas.

== Sources ==
- Barkauskas, Edmundas (7 February 2007). "Karininko tragedija". XXI amžius (in Lithuanian). 10 (1507).
- Bubnys, Arūnas (7 August 2001). "Lietuvių policijos batalionai Pskovo srityje ir Kurše: 13-asis ir 10(256)-asis batalionai (1942–1945)" [Lithuanian police battalions in the Pskov region and Curonia: 13th and 10th (256th) battalions (1942–1945)]. genocid.lt (in Lithuanian). Lietuvos gyventojų genocido ir rezistencijos tyrimo centras.
- Černius, Remigijus (2012). "Jonas Semaška - Liepa, Rikis, Gaučas" (PDF). genocid.lt (in Lithuanian).
- Semaškaitė, Janina (2000). Priesaika: Jonas Semaška-Liepa ir bendražygiai [Oath: Jonas Semaška-Liepa and his brothers in arms] (PDF) (in Lithuanian). Vilnius: Lietuvos gyventojų genocido ir rezistencijos tyrimo centras. ISBN 9986757401.
- Tutlys, Sigitas (20 November 2018). "Jonas Semaška". vle.lt (in Lithuanian).
- Žalienė, Dalia, ed. (2007). Lietuvos kariuomenės karininkai 1918-1953 (in Lithuanian). Vol. VII. Vilnius: Lietuvos Nacionalinis Muziejus. ISBN 978-9955-415-75-6. ISSN 1392-8929.
