= Žemaičiai military district =

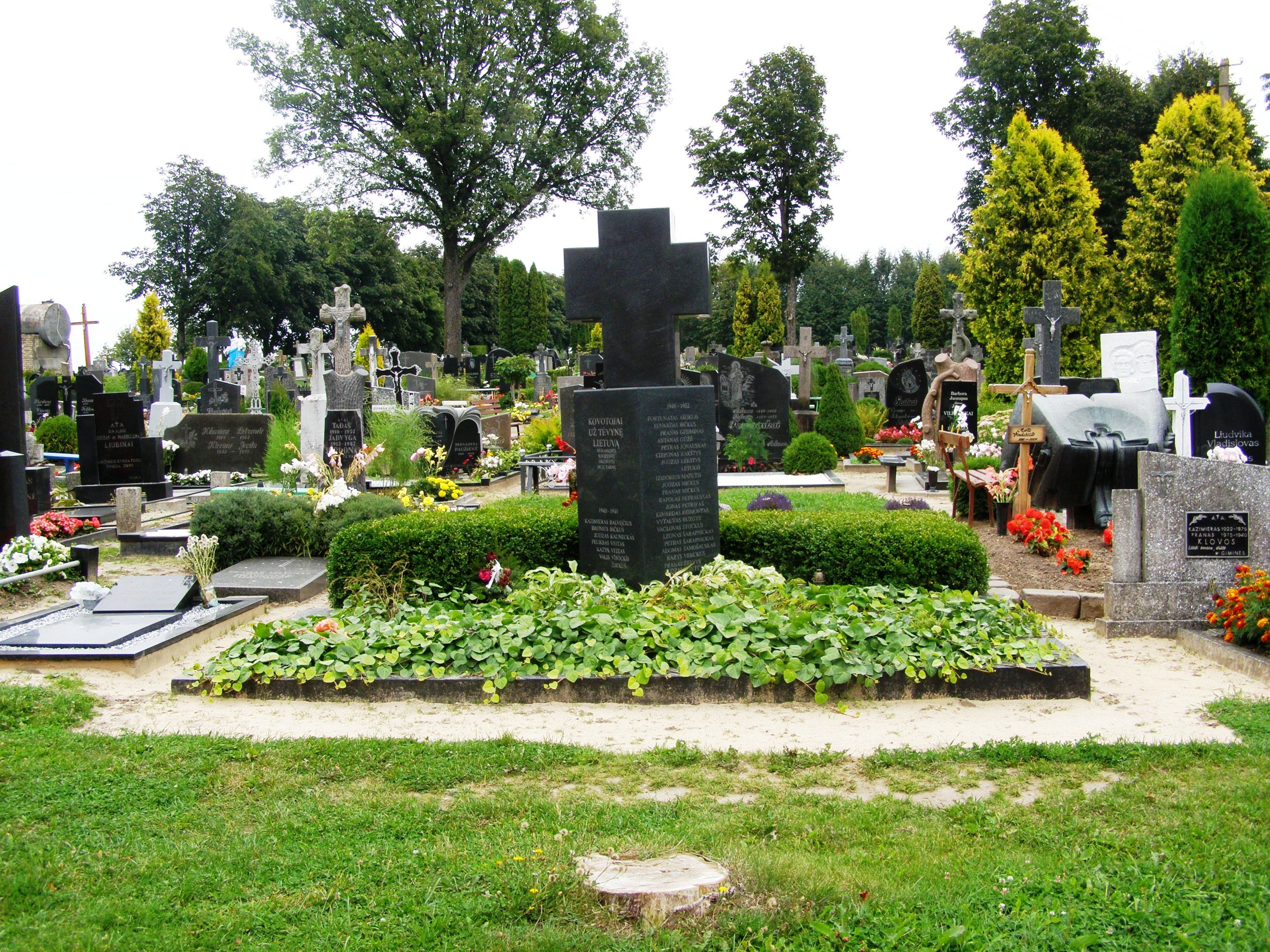
Tomb of Žemaičiai military district partisans in Ylakiai

Žemaičiai military district (Lithuanian: Žemaičių apygarda) was a military district of Lithuanian partisans which operated in 1945–1953 in the counties of Telšiai, Kretinga, Mažeikiai, and some parts of Tauragė county. It is named after ethnographic region of Lithuania - Samogitia.

== Leaders ==
Name and surname	Nom de guerre	Since	Till
Adolfas Kubilius	Balys, Radvila, Vaišvila	1945 March	1945 September
Jonas Semaška	Liepa, Rikis, Gaučas	1945 September	1946 April
Fortūnatas Ašoklis	Pelėda, Vilkas, Jonas, Silkoša	1946 May	1946 September
Kazimieras Antanavičius	Tauras	1946 September	1947 April
Kazys Juozaitis	Meteoras	1947 April	1947 October
Juozas Ivanauskas	Vygantas	1947 April	1947 October
Vladas Montvydas	Žemaitis	1948 March	1953 August

== Structure of Lithuanian partisans' organisation ==
LLKS
Western Lithuania (Jūra) region	Southern Lithuania (Nemunas) region	Eastern Lithuania (King Mindaugas) region
Žemaičiai military district	Prisikėlimas military district	Kęstutis military district	Tauras military district	Dainava military district	Algimantas military district	Vytautas military district	Vytis military district	Didžioji Kova military district
Alka	Maironis	Vaidotas	Vytautas	Dzūkai	Žalioji	Tigras	Krikštaponis
Šatrija	Duke Žvelgaitis	Birutė	Žalgiris	Šarūnas	Šarūnas	Liūtas	Briedis
Kardas	Juozapavičius	Butageidis	Geležinis vilkas	Kazimieraitis	Duke Margiris	Lokys
Lietuvos žalioji
