= Krizostomas Labanauskas =

Lithuanian anti-Soviet partisan

Krizostomas Labanauskas (codename Justas) was a Lithuanian anti-Soviet partisan and a commander of the Kęstutis military district from 1951 to 1952. Before becoming leader, he was the commander of the partisan Birutė unit. Little else is known about him; having lived during the final years of the partisan movement, in 1956 he voluntarily surrendered to the MGB under the codename Kalinauskas, betraying some fellow partisans in the process. He died in 2000 in Švenčionėliai.

== See also ==
- Anti-Soviet partisans
- Forest Brothers
