= Plechavičius =

- Lithuanian surname
- m.: Plechavičius
- f.: (unmarried): Plechavičiutė
- f.: (married): Plechavičienė

Plechavičius is the masculine form of a Lithuanian family name. Its feminine forms are: Plechavičienė (married woman or widow) and Plechavičiūtė (unmarried woman).

According to the Lithuanian surname database, the surname was mostly found within northern Samogitia (Papilė, Seda, Skuodas, and Pakruojis).

In addition, cf. Lithuanian: Plekavičius and Plekys, Polish: Plech, Piechowski and Flakowicz, and Russian: Плехов, romanized: Plekhov (Plekhov).

Notable people with the surname include:

- Aleksandras Plechavičius (1897–1942), Lithuanian military officer in the Imperial Russian Army and then the Lithuanian Army.
- Povilas Plechavičius (1890–1973), Lithuanian general and statesman, military officer in the Imperial Russian Army and then the Lithuanian Army.
