= Ylakiai =

- Town
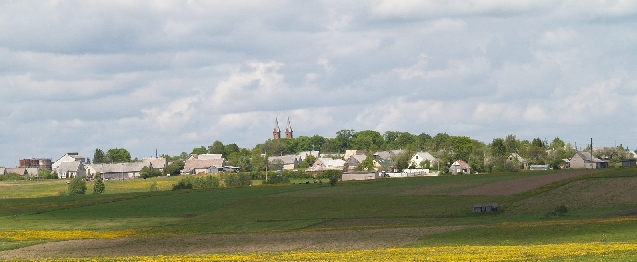

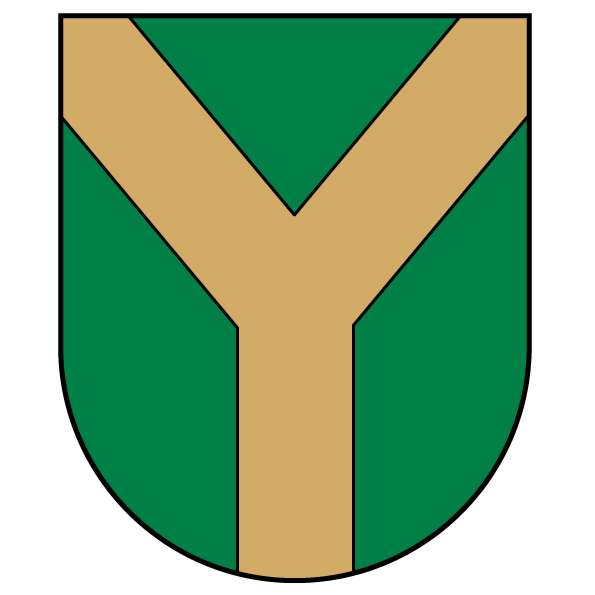
- Coat of arms

- Location within Lithuania
- Coordinates: 56°16′50″N 21°51′0″E
- Country: Lithuania
- County: Klaipėda County

Population (2021)
  - Total: 713
- Time zone: UTC+2 (EET)
  - Summer (DST): UTC+3 (EEST)

Ylakiai (Polish: Iłoki) is a town in Skuodas County, in northwestern Lithuania. According to the census of 2011, the town has a population of 950 people.

== History ==
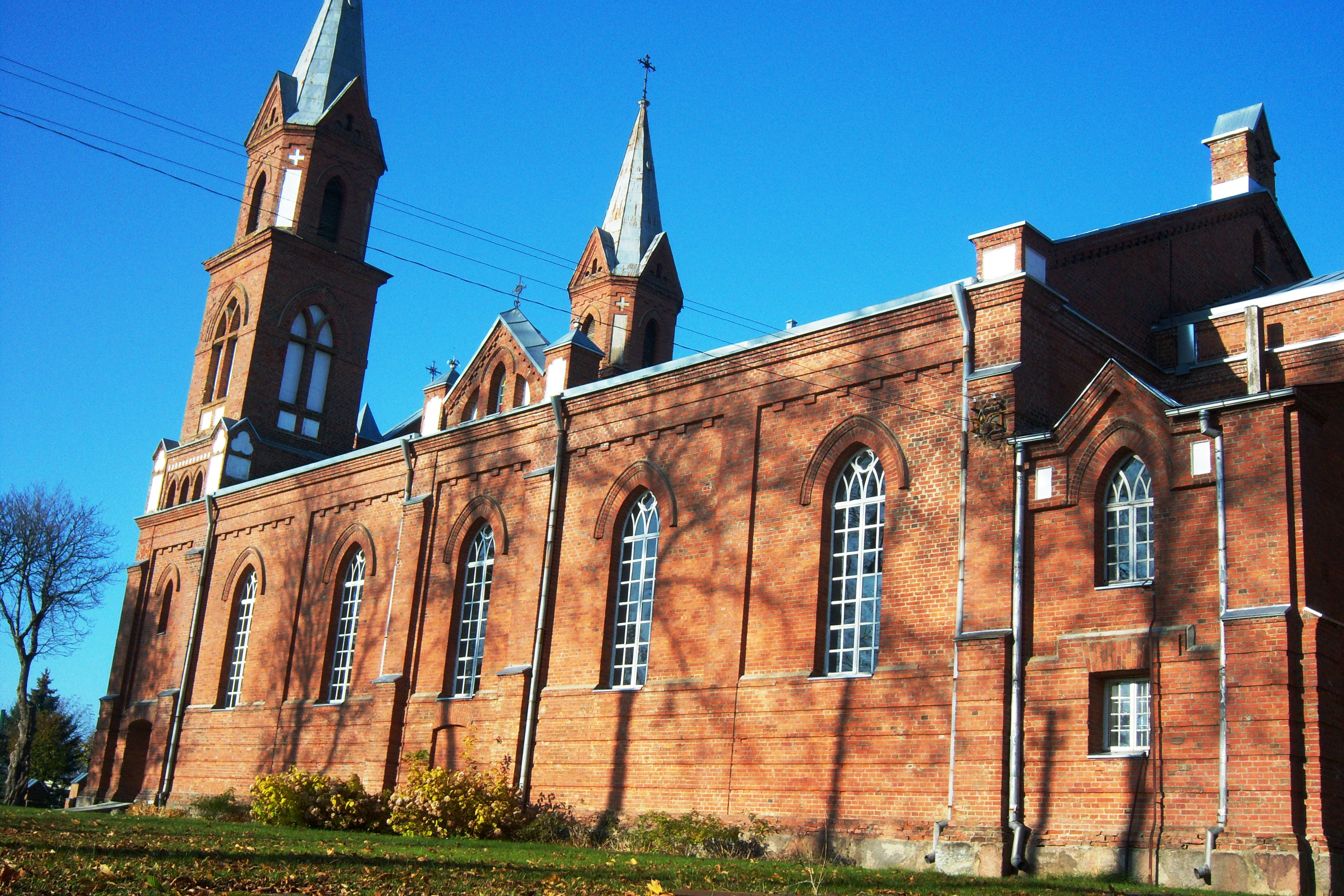
Church of the Annunciation in Ylakiai

Ylakiai was first mentioned in 1568 in the inventory list of Grūstė parish made by Jokūbas Laskovskis. At that time Ylakiai village was in the dominion of Skuodas estate.

In 1894 a church was built there, which stands to this day.

In July 1941, 300 Jews were murdered in a mass execution perpetrated by Lithuanian Nazis. A monument stone was erected in 1965 but a new monument was erected in 1988 at the location of the massacre.

In 2002 President of the Republic of Lithuania approved the new coat of arms of Ylakiai.

An urban monument stands in the central part of the town.
