= Eržvilkas =

- Town
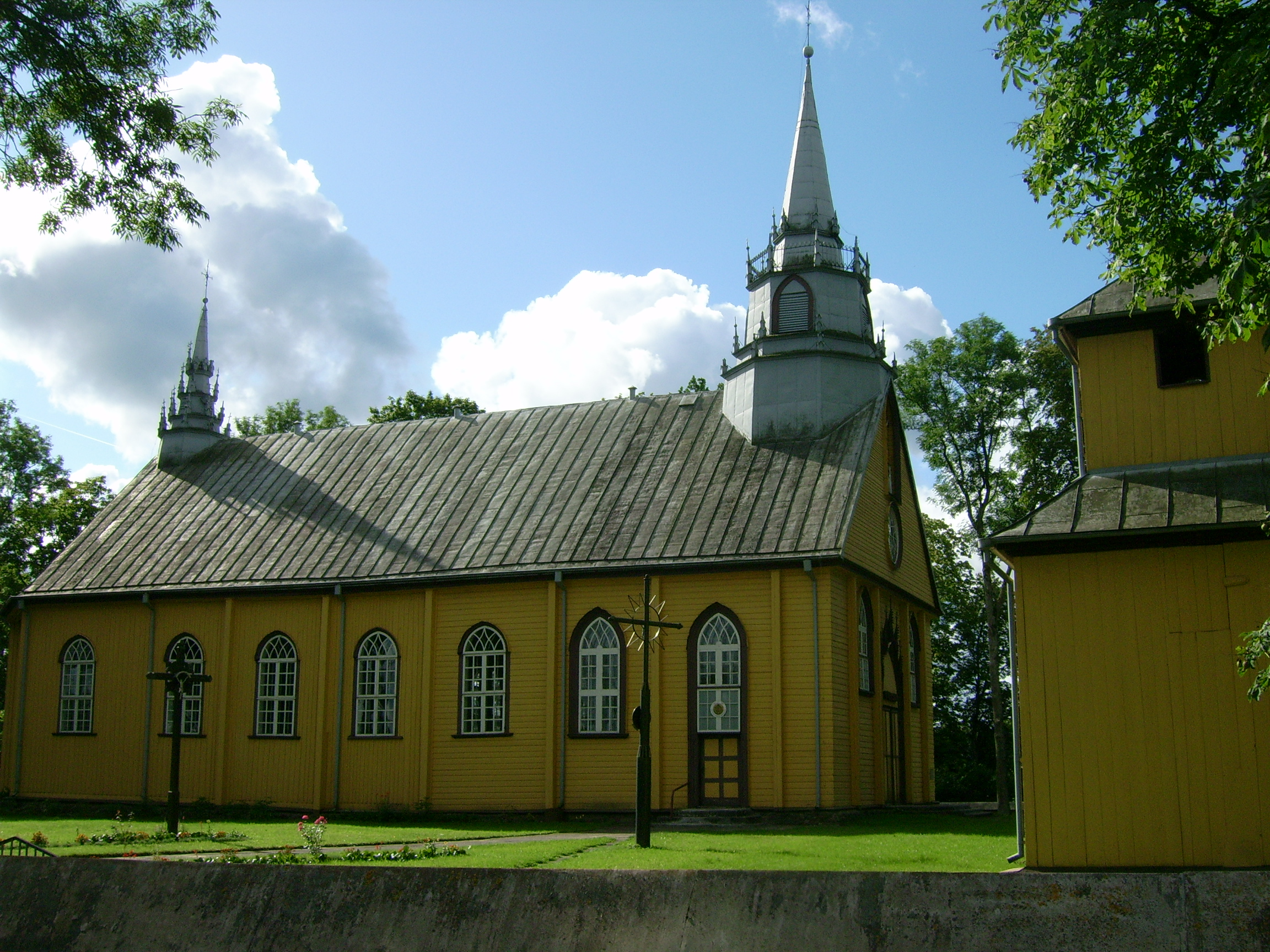

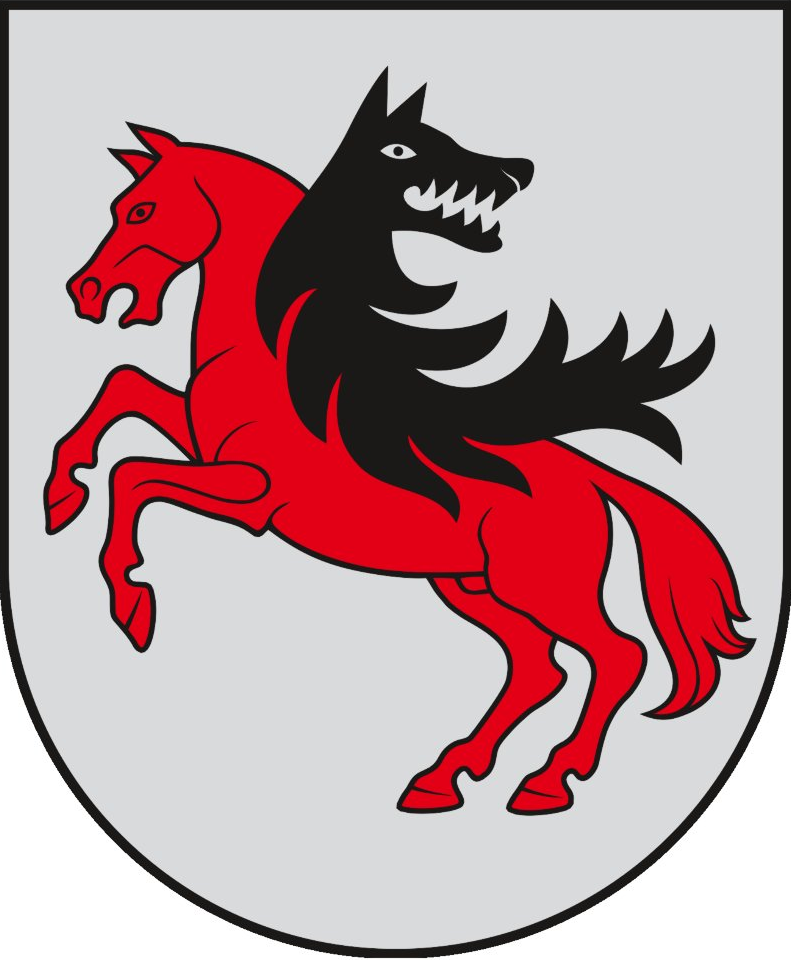
- Coat of arms

- Location within Lithuania
- Coordinates: 55°15′50″N 22°42′30″E
- Country: Lithuania
- County: Tauragė County
- Municipality: Jurbarkas District Municipality

Population (2011)
  - Total: 429
- Time zone: UTC+2 (EET)
  - Summer (DST): UTC+3 (EEST)

Eržvilkas (Samogitian: Eržvėlks) is a town in Taurage County, Lithuania. According to the 2011 census, the town has a population of 429 people.

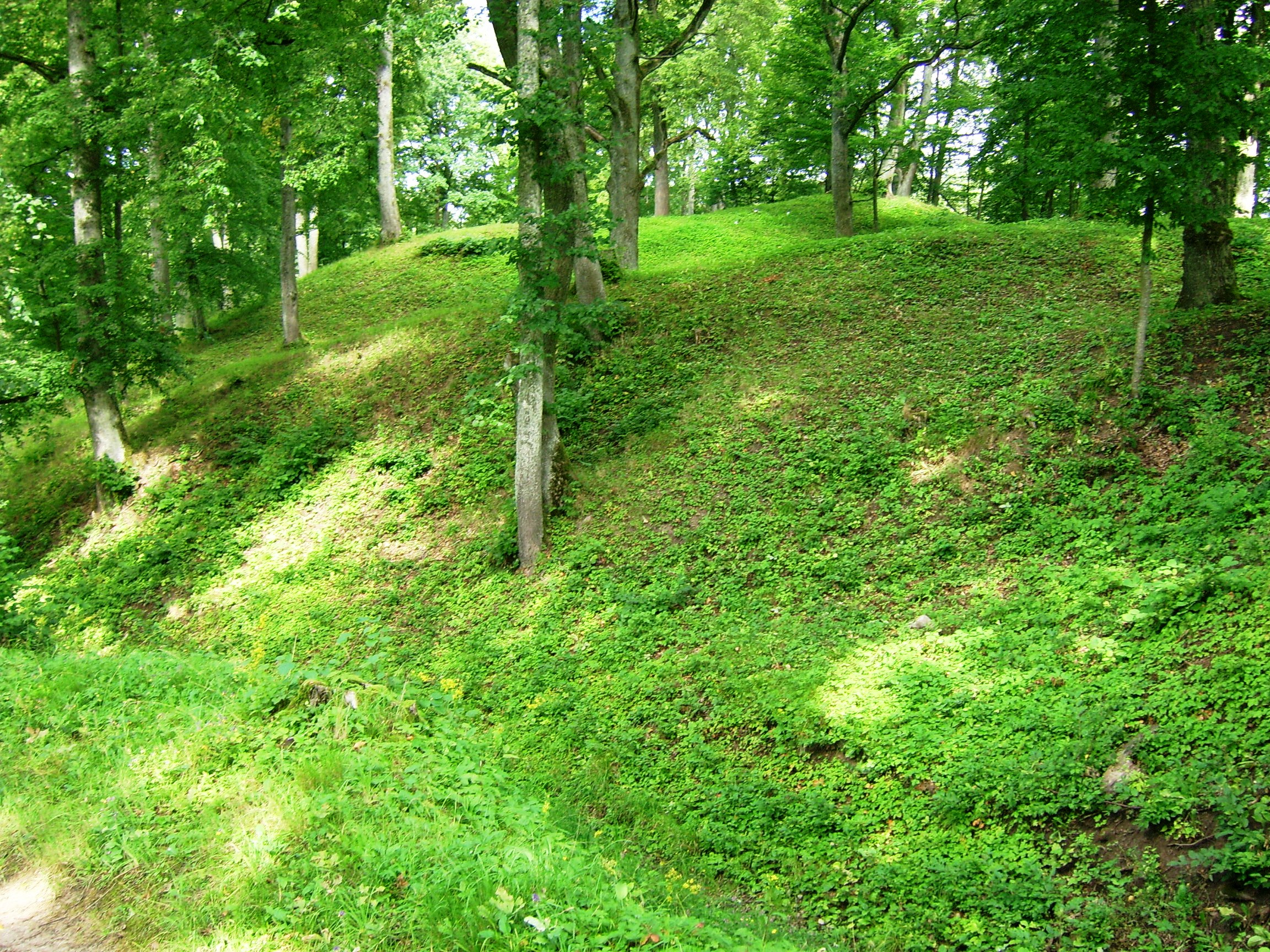
Eržvilkas mound

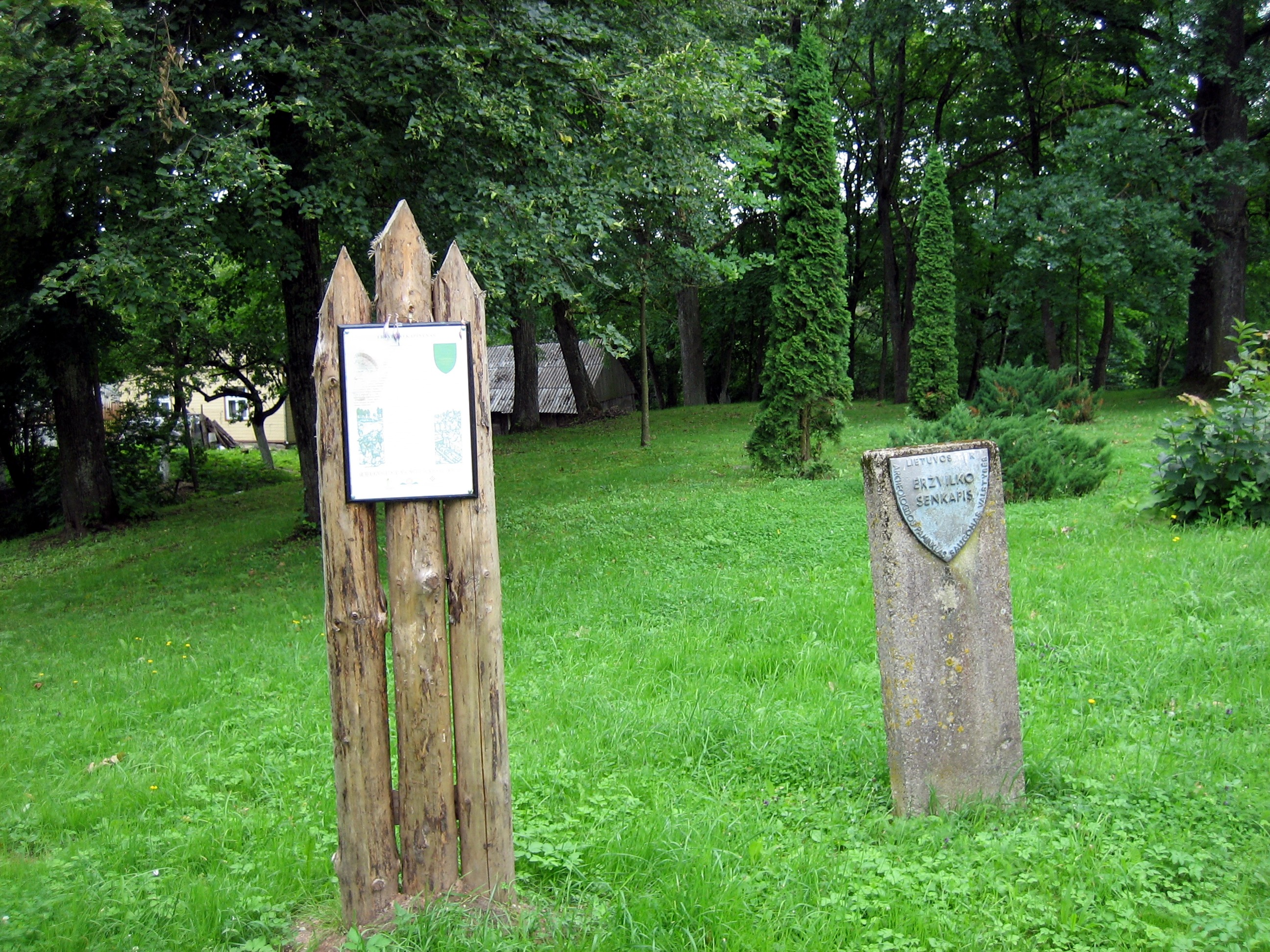
Eržvilkas old cemetery

== Etymology ==
Eržilas + vilkas ("stallion" + "wolf"). The name of the town comes from the name of the local stream with the same name, a tributary of the Šaltuona river. According to a local legend, a detachment of Crusaders was chased off after one Samogitian scared Crusader's horses by wolf's scent by covering his stallion with wolf's hide and letting him go onto the Crusader's herd. This event is reflected in the coat of arms of the town.

== History ==
=== Jewish history ===
Before World War II and the Holocaust, the village had an important Jewish community. In 1923, they were 46% of the total population.

At the beginning of the Second World War there were 180 Jews living in the village.

In 1941 these Jews were exploited as forced labour. In September 1941, they were murdered in mass executions perpetrated by an Einsatzgruppen of Lithuanian policemen at the Gryblaukis forest.

== Notable residents ==
- Hermann Schapira (1840–1898), a mathematician and important forerunner of the Zionist movement, was born here
