= Jonas Žemaitis =

Acting president of Lithuania from 1949 to 1954

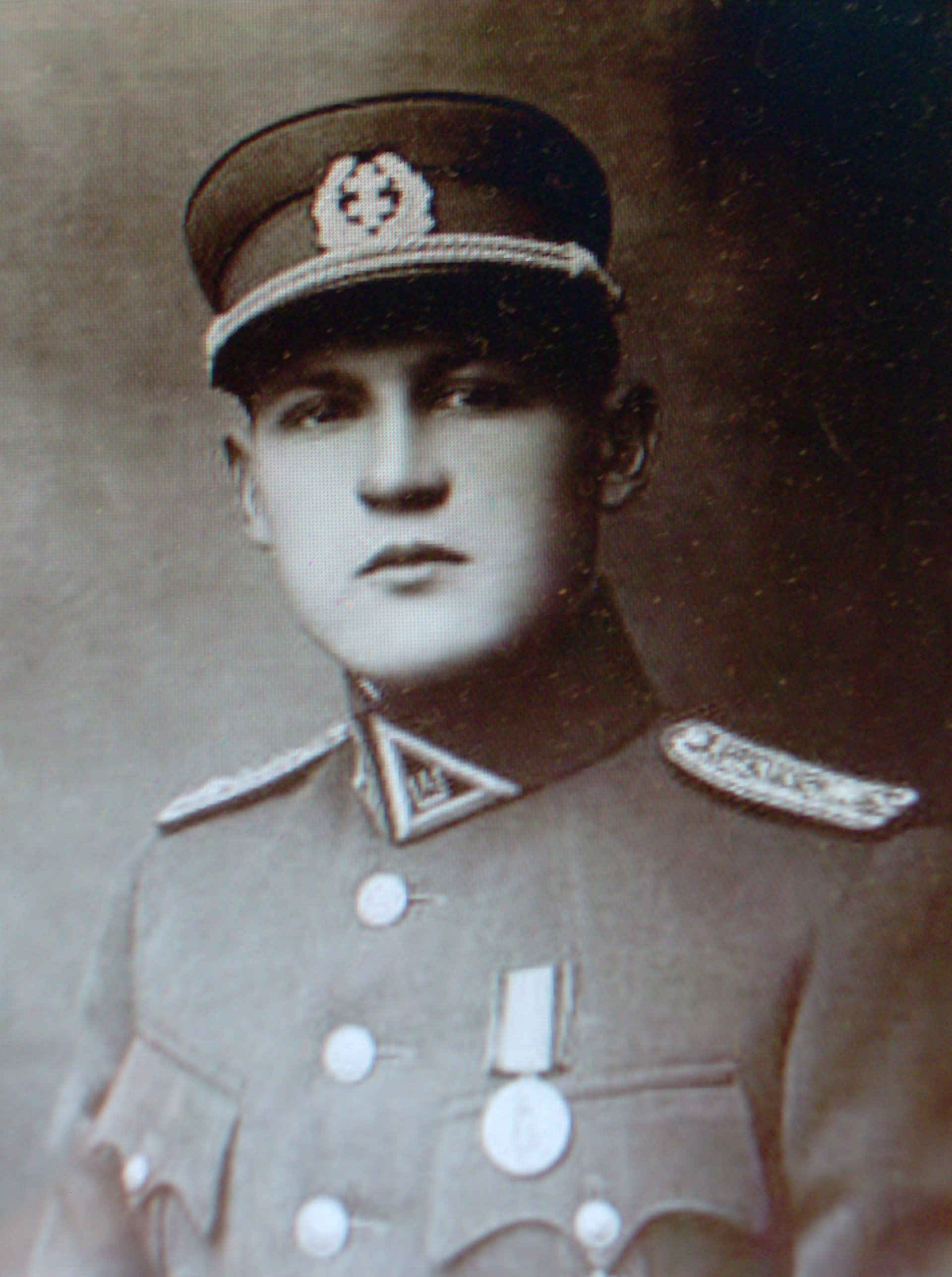
- Žemaitis in 1928

Acting President of Lithuania
- As Chairman of the Presidium of the Council of the Union of Lithuanian Freedom Fighters; Posthumously recognized on 12 March 2009
- In office 16 February 1949 – 26 November 1954
- Preceded by: Antanas Merkys (last head of state before the Soviet annexation in 1940)
- Succeeded by: Adolfas Ramanauskas (Posthumously recognized in November 2018; then vice chairman of the Union of Lithuanian Freedom Fighters)

Personal details
- Born: 15 March 1909 Palanga, Courland Governorate, Russian Empire
- Died: 26 November 1954 (aged 45) Butyrka prison, Moscow, Russian SFSR, Soviet Union

Military service
- Allegiance: Lithuania
- Years of service: 1926–1940 (Lithuanian Armed Forces); 1940–1941 (Red Army); 1944 (Lithuanian Territorial Defense Force); 1945–1953 (Lithuanian partisans)
- Rank: Brigade General
- Commands: Union of Lithuanian Freedom Fighters

Jonas Žemaitis, also known under his nom de guerre Vytautas (15 March 1909 – 26 November 1954), was a Lithuanian general and a Lithuanian partisan who led the resistance against the Soviet occupation. He was the chairman of the Union of Lithuanian Freedom Fighters.

Following the re-establishment of Lithuanian independence, Žemaitis was posthumously acknowledged as the head of state of Lithuania and awarded the status of the president for the period from 1949 until his death in 1954.

== Biography ==
Žemaitis was born to Jonas Žemaitis and Petronėlė Daukšaitė. Despite the fact that his father was non-religious, Žemaitis was christened in Palanga's church. From 1910 to 1917, he lived with his parents in Łomża, Poland, where his uncle A. Daukša owned a large dairy farm. In Łomża, Žemaitis attended a primary school while his parents were working. In 1917, Žemaitis returned to Lithuania and settled down in the village of Kiaulininkai, near Šiluva, where his grandparents lived. In 1921, he finished first class at the Raseiniai Gymnasium. In September 1926, he started studying at the War School of Kaunas. In 1929, he finished this school and became a junior lieutenant. Žemaitis started his military service with the 2nd Artillery Regiment, 5th battery, as a commander. In 1936–1938, Žemaitis studied at the School of Applied Artillery in Fontainebleau, France. On 23 November 1937, Žemaitis was promoted to captain and commanded artillery units in the Lithuanian military.

During the Soviet occupation of Lithuania in 1940, as Lithuanian military was dismantled and some units absorbed into the Red Army, Žemaitis was transferred to the 617th Artillery Regiment, 184th Rifle Division (within 29th Rifle Corps). The Soviet repressions affected him personally: during the deportations of June 1941, the entire family of Žemaitis' sister, including their three children, was sent to Siberia. At the beginning of the German invasion of the Soviet Union, Žemaitis was at the military training area near Varėna. After receiving the order to retreat to the east, Žemaitis and a group of soldiers consciously fell behind and surrendered to the Germans. He did not want to serve the Nazis, and therefore he retired and settled down in Kaunas, where he worked as a peat extraction technician. In June 1942, he returned to Kiaulininkai village where he worked in agriculture until March 1944.

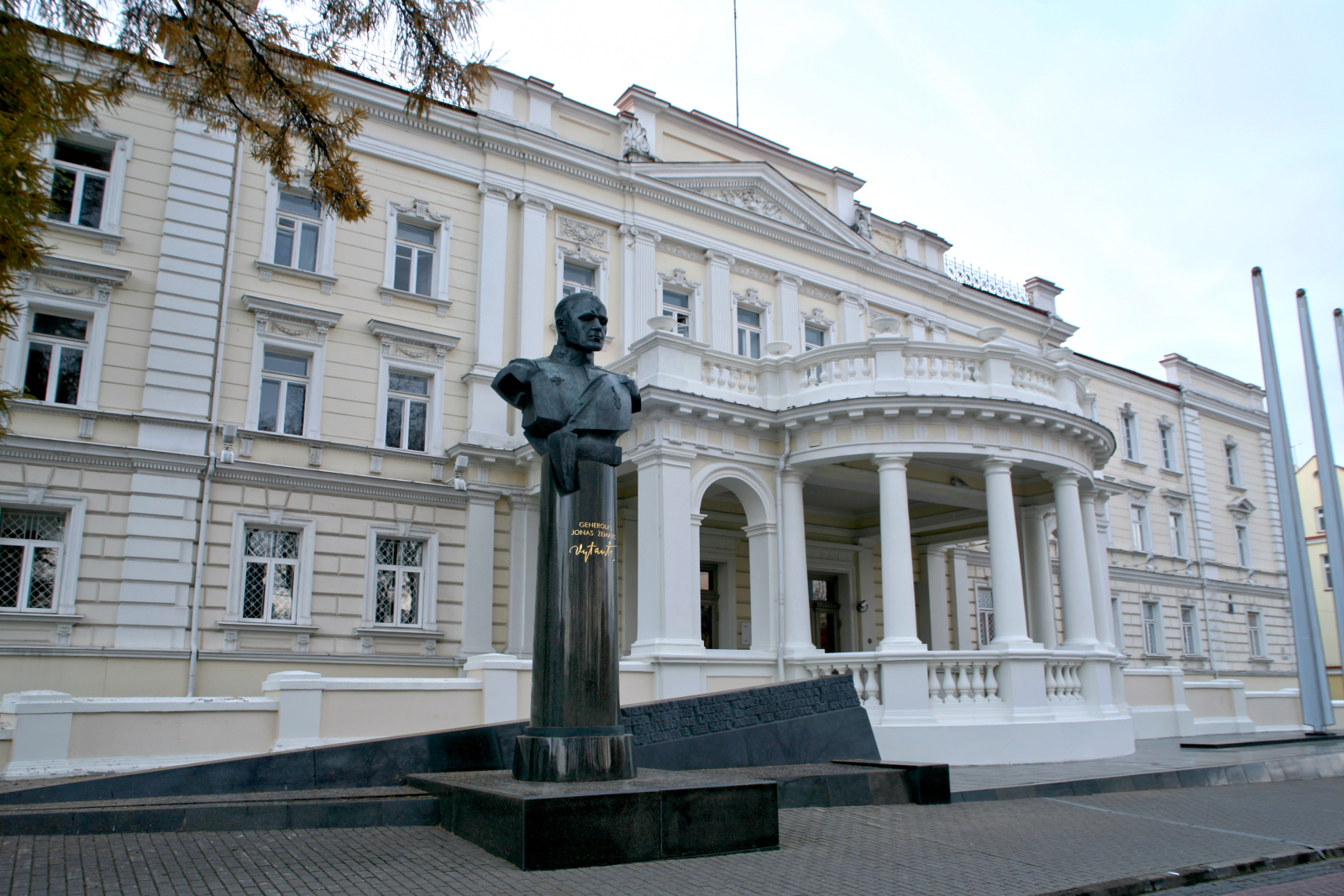
Jonas Žemaitis Monument in front of the Ministry of National Defence, Vilnius.

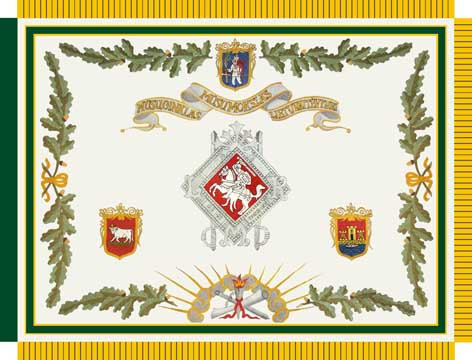
Flag of General Jonas Žemaitis Military Academy of Lithuania

In 1944, he joined the Lithuanian Territorial Defense Force, organized by Povilas Plechavičius. After the force was disbanded by the Nazis, Žemaitis went into hiding. When the Red Army returned to Lithuania, Žemaitis joined the Lithuanian Liberty Army and the Lithuanian partisans, steadily rising to a position of leadership. In February 1949, he established the Union of Lithuanian Freedom Fighters and became its chairman; he worked to unify the partisan units, establish legal framework for partisan activities and continued resistance against the Soviet. In December 1951, he suffered a cerebral hemorrhage and became paralyzed. His place of hiding was discovered by Soviet MVD forces arrested him on 30 May 1953. After being transported to Moscow, he was interrogated by the minister of Internal Affairs of the Soviet Union Lavrentiy Beria and was executed in the Butyrka prison in 1954.

== Legacy ==
With the independence of Lithuania, Žemaitis was recognized as a national hero of Lithuania. A monument to Žemaitis was erected in Vilnius near the Lithuanian Ministry of Defense. There is also a monument to the general in Palanga.

Jonas Žemaitis is the namesake of the General Jonas Žemaitis Military Academy of Lithuania. In 1995, a documentary Ketvirtasis Prezidentas (The Fourth President) was released about his life. Posthumously, Jonas Žemaitis-Vytautas was awarded the rank of brigadier general, and was officially named as the fourth President of Lithuania in March 2009.

In 2026, it was announced that the French town Fontainebleau will open memorial plaque for Žemaitis.

== Bibliography ==
- Eidintas, Alfonsas; Juodis, Darius; Surgailis, Gintautas (2019). Partisan general Jonas Žemaitis-Vytautas (PDF). Vilnius: General Jonas Žemaitis Military Academy of Lithuania. ISBN 978-609-8074-93-2.
