= Lithuanian Liberty Army =

- Lietuvos laisvės armija (LLA)
- Brassard used by the LLA's Vanagai sector
- Active: 13 December 1941 – 17 April 1946
- Allegiance: Lithuania
- Size: c. 10,000 (summer 1944)
- Engagements: Guerrilla war in the Baltic states

Commanders
- Founder and first commander: Kazys Veverskis

The Lithuanian Liberty Army (sometimes also named as Lithuanian Freedom Army) (Lithuanian: Lietuvos laisvės armija or LLA) was a Lithuanian underground military organization established by Kazys Veverskis (codename Senis), a Vilnius University Law Faculty student, on December 13, 1941. Its goal were to re-establish independent Lithuania via political and military means.

It was part of the anti-Nazi resistance during the German occupation of Lithuania during World War II as it opposed German policies, but did not begin armed resistance. The armed struggle began in mid-1944 when the Red Army reached the Lithuanian borders after the Minsk offensive.

The LLA became the first wave of the Lithuanian partisans. It attempted to become the central command of the armed struggle. However, the organization was liquidated by the Soviet security forces (NKVD and MGB) by April 1946. The organization's remnants were absorbed by other partisans. The guerrilla war continued until 1953.

== Organization and German occupation ==
The LLA distanced itself from other political resistance organizations in Lithuania. It believed that various organizations and factions splintered Lithuanian unity by petty bickering. The LLA was supposed to be a disciplined, military-based organization. It was the only sizable organization from the Lithuanian resistance that did not participate in the activities of the Supreme Committee for the Liberation of Lithuania (created in 1943) and did not support the creation of the Plechavičius-led Lithuanian Territorial Defense Force because it thought that ultimately the Lithuanian soldiers would be needlessly sacrificed, but the LLA did not dare to speak concretely and directly against it. The organization also strictly prohibited its members from leaving Lithuania (i.e. retreating with the Wehrmacht).

Veverskis was in charge of the headquarters, personally oversaw writing of orders and directives, and published newspaper Karinės ir politinės žinios (Military and Political News), targeting members of LLA and its commanders, and Karžygys (Warrior), targeting general public. The LLA operated an illegal printing press in Vilnius which published the Military and Political News every ten days, with a circulation of 500 to 1,000 copies.

His right-hand man was lieutenant Adolfas Eidimtas (codename Žybartas, Vygantas). Veverskis also actively recruited new members, particularly those serving in the Lithuanian Auxiliary Police. Among the recruits were twelve former colonels of the Lithuanian Army, who became commanders of LLA districts. The Army was organized in four regions (Vilnius, Kaunas, Šiauliai, and Panevėžys), which were further subdivided into districts based on the administrative divisions of Lithuania. According to regulations, each district had to have headquarters with operational, reconnaissance, organizational, and personnel departments. It unsuccessfully planned to send troops to combat the Polish Home Army in the Vilnius Region (see the Polish–Lithuanian relations during World War II).

== Soviet occupation and liquidation ==
On July 1, 1944, LLA declared the state of war and ordered all its able members to mobilize into platoons, stationed in forests. The organization, possibly drawing from the experiences of the 1941 anti-Soviet June uprising, envisioned a brief uprising followed by the establishment of the independent Lithuanian state. The departments were replaced by two sectors – operational, called Vanagai (Hawks or Falcons; abbreviated VS), and organizational (abbreviated OS). Vanagai, commanded by Albinas Karalius (codename Varenis), were the armed fighters while the organizational sector was tasked with passive resistance, including supply of food, information, and transport to Vanagai. Staff headquarters were in the Plokštinė forest near Plateliai Lake, Samogitia where LLA had a training camp. On July 19, 1944, Veverskis, general Motiejus Pečiulionis and engineer Bronius Snarskis established the Lithuanian Defence Committee (Lithuanian: Lietuvos gynimo komitetas) which was supposed to unite all anti-Soviet resistance groups and factions, but was destroyed in April 1945 when the Soviet secret services arrested its leadership.

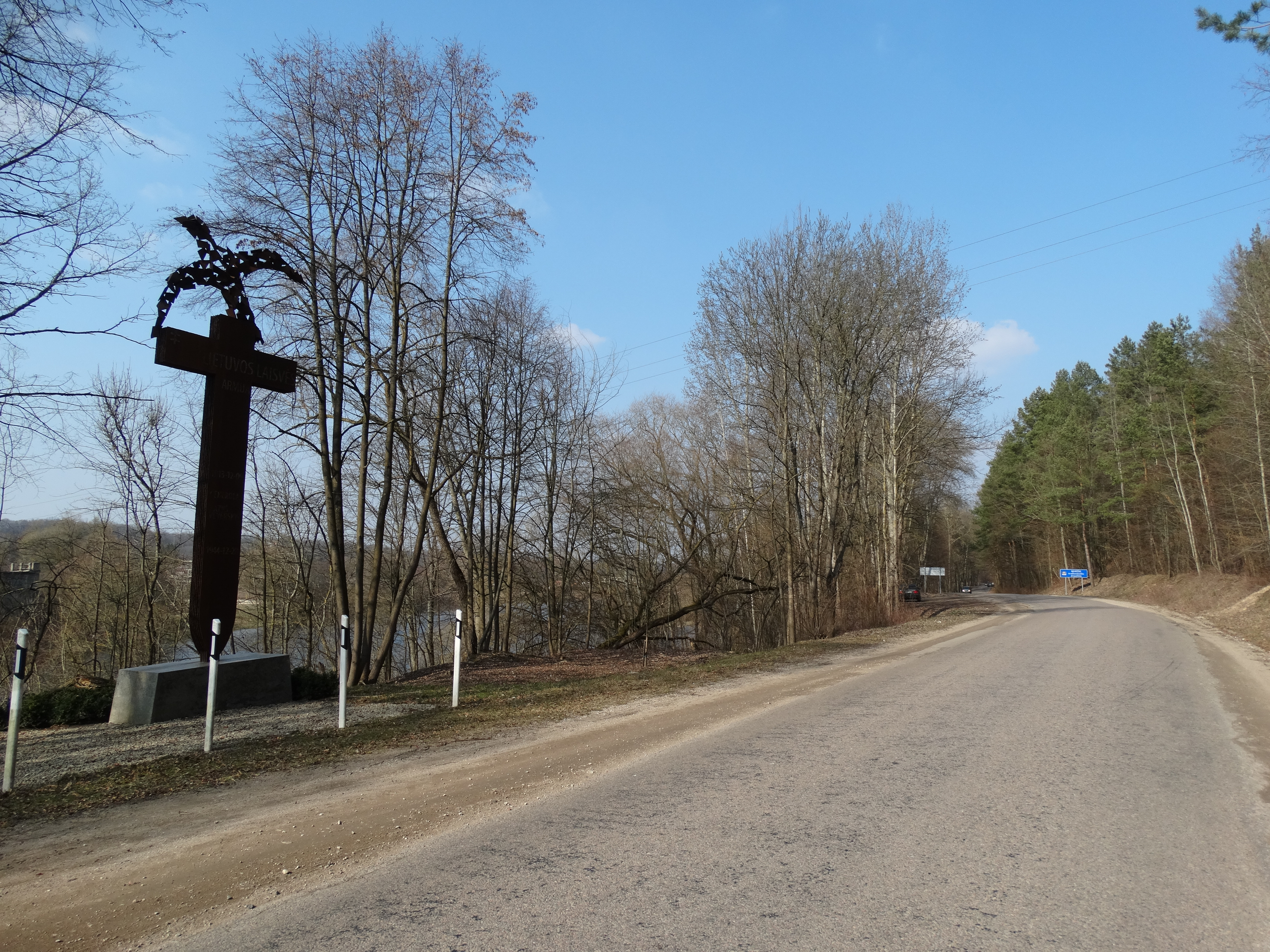
A monument to Kazys Veverskis, commander of LLA, built on the spot of his death

Many LLA members retreated to Germany, becoming the displaced persons, others responded to the call starting the Lithuanian partisan movement. During interrogation, Eidimtas told the NKVD that LLA numbered up to 10,000 men by mid-1944, but that is likely an exaggeration. The LLA obtained a limited amount of armament and munitions from Nazi Germany. In August–September 1944, LLA sent about 100 fighters to a German reconnaissance (Abwehr) school; they returned as paratroopers. The organization was not successful in fighting the Soviets. According to official statistics from NKVD, the Soviets killed 659 and arrested 753 members of the LLA by January 26, 1945. Founder Veverskis was killed in December 1944, while Eidimtas was arrested in April 1945, with the headquarters being liquidated in December 1945. This represented the failure of highly centralized resistance, as the organization was too dependent on Veverskis and other top commanders. Lower-level organization remained, especially in Samogitia and Aukštaitija, and was absorbed by the partisan movement. Remnants of its organizational structure survived until the end of the guerrilla war in 1953. One of the LLA members, Jonas Žemaitis, became the commander of the Union of Lithuanian Freedom Fighters.

== Sources ==
- Anušauskas, Arvydas, ed. (2005). Lietuva, 1940–1990 (in Lithuanian). Vilnius: Lietuvos gyventojų genocido ir rezistencijos tyrimo centras. ISBN 9986-757-65-7.
- Blaževičius, Kazys (2003-09-17). "Lietuvos laisvės armija okupacijų metais". XXI amžius (in Lithuanian). 71 (1175).
- Bubnys, Arūnas (2003). Nazi Resistance Movement in Lithuania 1941–1944. Vaga. ISBN 5-415-01684-8.
- Čekutis, Ričardas; Žygelis, Dalius (2007-05-14). "Laisvės kryžkelės. Lietuvos laisvės armija". Bernardinai.lt (in Lithuanian).
- Dorril, Stephen (2002). MI6: Inside the Covert World of Her Majesty's Secret Intelligence Service. Simon and Schuster. ISBN 0-7432-1778-0.
- Kasparas, Kęstutis (2018). "Lietuvos gynimo komitetas". vle.lt (in Lithuanian).
- Kuodytė, Dalia (2016). "Lietuvos laisvės armija". In Manelis, Eugenijus; Račis, Antanas (eds.). Lietuvos istorija. Enciklopedinis žinynas (in Lithuanian). Vol. II. Mokslo ir enciklopedijų leidybos centras. ISBN 978-5-420-01765-4.
- Misiunas, Romuald; Taagepera, Rein (1993). The Baltic States: Years of Dependence 1940–1990. University of California Press. ISBN 0-520-04625-0.
- Trimonienė, Rūta (December 2013). "Kazys Veverskis-Senis" (PDF). genocid.lt (in Lithuanian). Lietuvos gyventojų genocido ir rezistencijos tyrimo centras.
