= Anti-Soviet partisans =

Anti-Soviet guerrilla movements

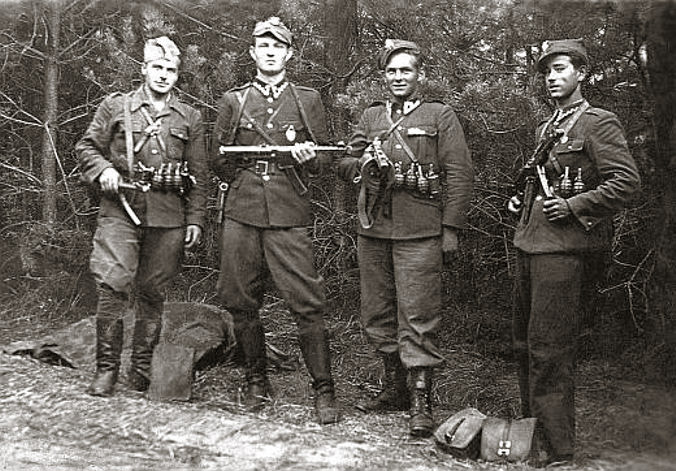
Polish anti-communist partisans in 1947. Photograph from the Solidarność Walcząca archives.

Anti-Soviet partisans may refer to various resistance movements that opposed the Soviet Union and its satellite states at various periods during the 20th century, between the Russian Revolution (1917) and the collapse of the Soviet Union (1991).

== During the Russian Civil War and Interwar period ==
- Basmachi movement
- Green armies
- August Uprising
- Forest Guerrillas
- Revolutionary Insurgent Army of Ukraine
- Organizations of the White movement in the 1920s–1930s:
  - Brotherhood of Russian Truth
  - Russian All-Military Union

== During the Second World War and its aftermath ==
- Armata Neagră (Moldovan SSR)
- Chechen anti-communist resistance movement (1940–1944)
- Chetniks (Kingdom of Yugoslavia/Serbia)
- Cursed soldiers (Poland)
- Goryani (Bulgaria)
- Guerrilla war in the Baltic states
  - Estonian partisans
  - Latvian partisans
  - Lithuanian partisans
- Organisations formed by Nazi Germany
  - GULAG Operation (Komi ASSR)
  - Black Cats (Byelorussian SSR)
  - Crusaders (Independent State of Croatia)
  - Russian People's Liberation Army (Russian SFSR)
  - Werwolf (Nazi Germany)
- Anti-Soviet resistance in Belarus (1944–1950s)
- Polish anti-communist resistance movement (1944–1953)
- Republic of Rossony
- Romanian anti-communist resistance movement (1947–1962)
  - Belarusian People's Partisans
- Ukrainian anti-Soviet resistance

== During the Cold War ==
- Afghan mujahideen (DR Afghanistan)
  - Afghanistan Mujahedin Freedom Fighters Front
  - Islamic Party of Afghanistan
- Operation Gladio (NATO member states)
  - Bund Deutscher Jugend (West Germany)
  - Counter-Guerrilla (Turkey)
  - Informationsbyrån (Sweden)
  - Kampfgruppe gegen Unmenschlichkeit (West Germany)
  - Nihtilä-Haahti Plan (Finland)
  - Operation Washtub (United States–Alaska Territory)
  - Projekt-26 (Switzerland)
  - Propaganda Due (Italy)
  - SDRA8 and STC/Mob (Belgium)
  - Study and Training Group for Military Reconnaissance (West Germany)

== See also ==
- Anti-communism
  - Anti-Sovietism
  - Criticisms of communist party rule
  - Eastern European anti-Communist insurgencies
  - White movement
- Decommunization
  - Decommunization in Russia
  - Decommunization in Ukraine
  - List of monuments and memorials removed following the Russian invasion of Ukraine
- Operation Priboi
- Partisan (military)
- Persecution of Christians in the Soviet Union
  - Catacomb Church
- Predictions of the collapse of the Soviet Union
- Political repression in the Soviet Union
  - Refusenik
  - Soviet dissidents
- Red Scare and Red Terror
- Resistance during World War II
- Russian war crimes in the 2022 Russian invasion of Ukraine
- Soviet Empire
- Soviet espionage in the United States
- Wars of national liberation
- White émigré
