= Juozas Paliūnas =

Colonel Juozas Paliūnas
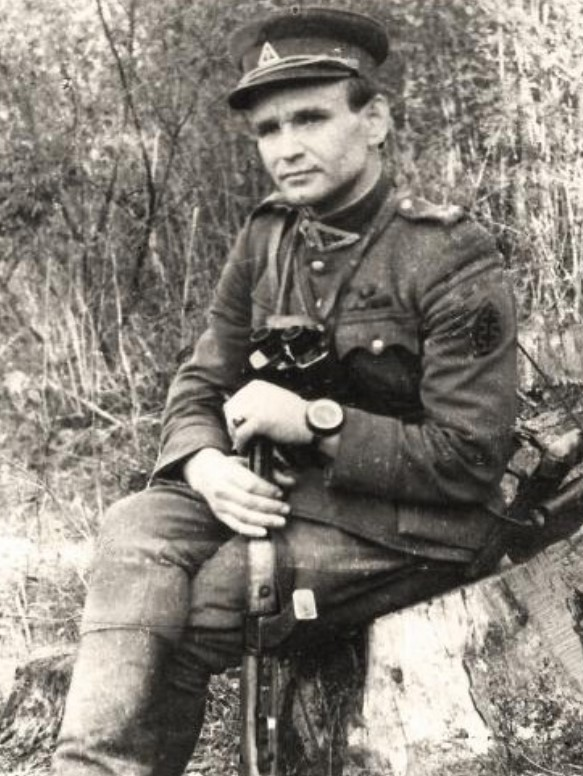

Commander of the Prisikėlimas military district
- In office 1 August 1951 – 20 May 1952
- Preceded by: Leonardas Grigonis

Personal details
- Born: 1 May 1915 Tilindžiai, Kovno Governorate, Russian Empire
- Died: 1 October 1952 (aged 37) Padotnuvys, Kėdainiai District Municipality, Lithuanian SSR
- Occupation: Lithuanian partisan

Military service
- Allegiance: Lithuania
- Years of service: 1944-1952 (Lithuanian partisans)
- Rank: Colonel (1998; posthumous)

Juozas Paliūnas, widely known by his codename Rytas (1 May 1915 – 1 October 1952) was an anti-Sovet Lithuanian partisan and the last commander of the Prisikėlimas military district.

== Biography ==
=== Early life ===
Juozas Paliūnas was born on 1 May 1915 to farmers Jurgis Paliūnas and Ona Masytė in the village of Tilindžiai in the modern-day Raseiniai district, then the Kovno Governorate of the Russian Empire. He was the youngest of nine children. His oldest brother Antanas died, while three others, Mečislovas, Vladas and Kazys were deported to Siberia. Only Kazys survived and returned to Lithuania. Another brother by the name of Jonas was a teacher until his death during the German occupation of Lithuania during World War II. In 1939 Paliūnas married Viktorija Petretytė, with whom he had two children.

=== Partisanship ===
Paliūnas joined the Lithuanian Liberty Army in 1944. In 1947 he was appointed the deputy leader of the Povilas Lukšys unit, belonging to the Kęstutis military district. At the creation of the Prisikėlimas military district, his unit became a part of the district and was renamed the Maironis unit. The new leader of the unit became Povilas Morkūnas. When Morkūnas became the commander of the Prisikėlimas military district, Paliūnas replaced him as the leader of the Maironis unit. Paliūnas often edited the district's newspaper Prisikėlimo Ugnis. On 20 June 1949 Paliūnas was awarded the rank of lieutenant by the partisans for his exemplary service. Paliūnas spent much attention on partisan readiness and also publishing newspapers. He ordered the training of partisan groups and frequently inspected them. In 1950 he wrote his memoirs entitled Partizanu Keliu (The way of the partisan), which covered his period of resistance from 1941 to 1949.

On 1 August 1951 Paliūnas became the commander of the Prisikėlimas military district. Immediately he put effort into re-establishing its headquarters. On 20 May 1952 the district was destroyed again and Paliūnas became the leader of the Povilas Lukšys unit for a second time. Not long after, the exact location of Paliūnas's headquarters in Padotnuvys was betrayed by a fellow partisan. On 1 October 1952 Paliūnas, not wanting to be captured in the ensuing fight, shot himself.

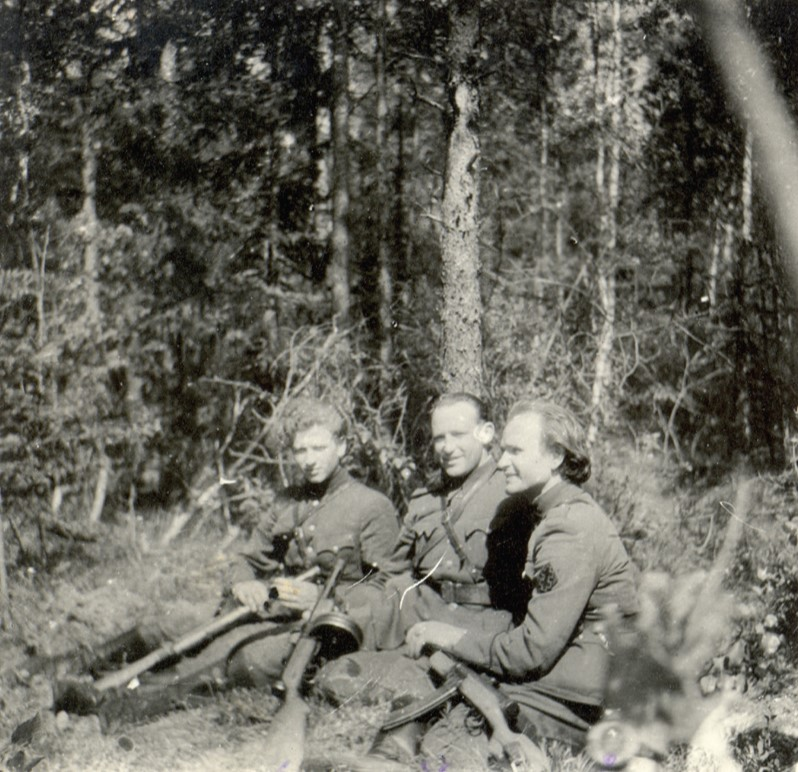
Partisans of the Prisikėlimas dissitrct. Povilas Morkūnas sits in the middle while Juozas Paliūnas is on the right

== Remembrance ==
Paliūnas was awarded the rank of colonel in 1998. In 1999 he was awarded the Order of the Cross of Vytis, 3rd degree.

== See also ==
- Anti-Soviet partisans
- Forest Brothers
