= Povilas Morkūnas =

Anti-Soviet Lithuanian partisan (1920–1953)

Colonel Povilas Morkūnas
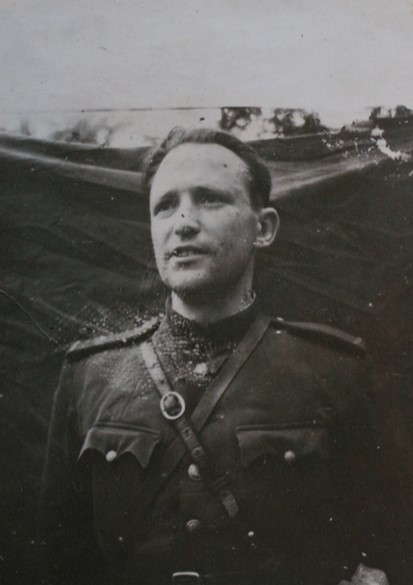

Commander of the Kęstutis military district
- In office 20 May 1952 – 19 June 1953
- Preceded by: Krizostomas Labanauskas
- Succeeded by: Jonas Vilčinskas

Commander of the Prisikėlimas military district
- In office 1 August 1949 – 2 August 1951
- Preceded by: Leonardas Grigonis
- Succeeded by: Juozas Paliūnas

Personal details
- Born: 26 November 1920 Zbaras, Raseiniai District Municipality, Republic of Lithuania
- Died: 19 June 1953 (aged 32) Plauginiai forest, Raseiniai District Municipality, Lithuanian SSR
- Occupation: Lithuanian partisan

Military service
- Allegiance: Lithuania
- Years of service: 1939–1940 (Lithuanian Army); 1941 (Lithuanian Activist Front); 1945-1953 (Lithuanian partisans)
- Rank: Colonel (1998; posthumous)

Povilas Morkūnas (26 November 1920 – 19 June 1953) was an anti-Soviet Lithuanian partisan and a commander of the Kęstutis and Prisikėlimas military districts. He was known by many codenames, such as Ežerietis, Dilba, Arvydas, Černius, Brizgis, Kyras, Mažvydas, Lastas, but mostly as Rimantas or Drakas.

== Biography ==
=== Early life ===
Povilas Morkūnas was born on 26 November 1920 in the village of Zbaras near Šiluva to farmers Kazimieras Morkūnas and Marijona Kmitaitė. He was the eldest of nine children. In 1935 he finished the Šiluva primary school, during which he participated in scout activities. For some time after that he studied at the Raseiniai agriculture school. He also worked as a policeman. In 1939 he joined the Lithuanian army and served in an artillery regiment. For his exemplary service he received the NCO rank of sergeant.

=== Operation Barbarossa ===
His unit was incorporated in the Soviet army after the Soviet occupation of Lithuania. During Operation Barbarossa the unit was dislocated near the Narach lake in Belarus. It was ordered to scout ahead, but Morkūnas and his men deserted back to Lithuania, as they were hopeful that the German army could still liberate Lithuania. After giving away his units' horses in a nearby village, they set off and were met by the Germans, who let the men return to their country. Morkūnas participated in the 1941 June uprising. Morkūnas spent the time of German occupation of Lithuania in his home village of Zbaras working at his parents farm. In 1944, when Germany was retreating, Morkūnas organized the anti-Soviet resistance around Šiluva.

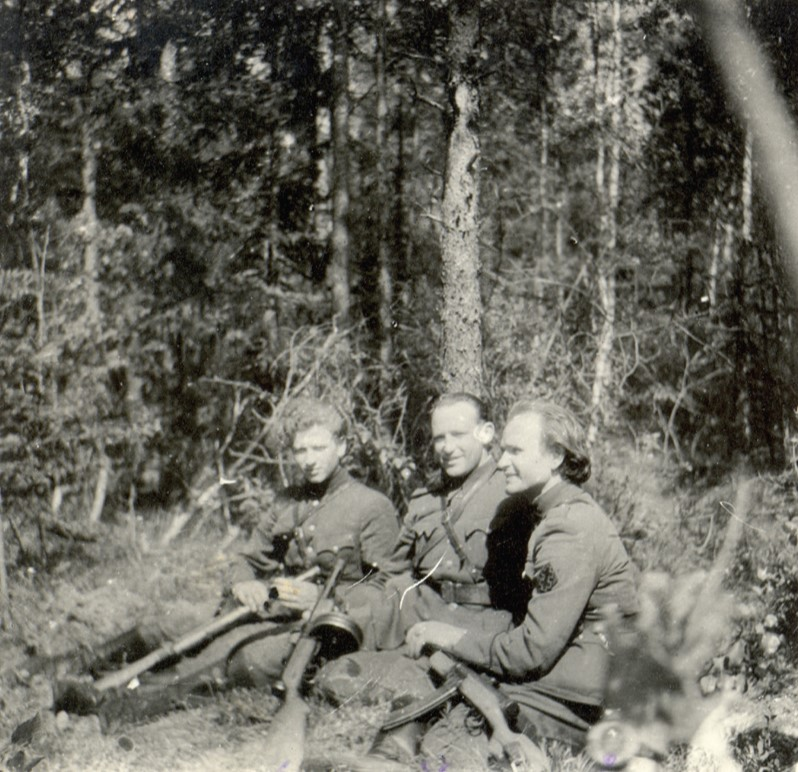
Partisans of the Prisikėlimas district. Povilas Morkūnas is sitting in the middle while his successor Juozas Paliūnas is on the right

=== Life as partisan ===
Morkūnas began his career as a member of the Žebenkštis unit operating around Raseiniai, which contained four squads, one of which was headed by Morkūnas. In 1945 Jonas Žemaitis joined the unit and replaced its previous commander J. Čeponis as senior leader. Morkūnas fought in the famous battle near Virtukai on 22 July 1945. On 6 July 1946 Morkūnas and Žemaitis commanded the largest battle in Žemaitija against the NKVD in Pyragiai. On 3 March 1948 Morkūnas became the head of the weakened Maironis unit (previously named the Povilas Lukšys unit) and began to organize local partisans into smaller subdivisions and re-establish discipline. With his second-in-command Juozas Paliūnas he inspected the partisan squads of other areas, took care of various documents and demanded squad leaders to make reports. In 1949 by the orders of the leadership of the Prisikėlimas military district Morkūnas was responsible for the publishing of the district headquarter-curated newspaper Prisikėlimo Ugnis. The newspaper was a collection of various partisan poems and songs of the surrounding areas. In 1950 the newspaper was re-published by the efforts of Morkūnas.

=== Rise to leadership ===
In the 2 February 1949 meeting of the partisan leadership in the village of Minaičiai (Note: This meeting would initiate the Lithuanian Partisans Declaration of February 16, 1949 in the following days.), Morkūnas was selected as the head of the Prisikėlimas military district, with his term starting on 1 August 1949. Morkūnas was almost detained when his bunker was surrounded by the NKVD, who offered him to surrender. He accepted but used the time of discussing the terms to win time and to think of a plan to escape the situation. With improvised coordination between him other partisans they engaged in a firefight during the night, during which Morkūnas silently escaped to the forest. His term ended on 1 August 1951, and on 2 August he was reassigned to be head the partisan West Lithuanian (Sea) Area. Juozas Paliūnas replaced him as the commander of the Prisikėlimas military district. On 20 May 1952 he replaced Krizostomas Labanauskas as the head of the Kęstutis military district. Due to Morkūnas's capability of publishing three volumes of the partisan poem and song collections and providing them for every organizational unit of the LLKS, on 1 January 1952 Jonas Žemaitis, then the chairman of the union, awarded Morkūnas the 2nd degree of the freedom fighter cross.

=== Final years ===
As organized partisan resistance was becoming significantly weaker, Jonas Žemaitis and Morkūnas reportedly once made plans to get fake documents and move to Poland and further abroad. In 1952 the MGB captured a high-ranking partisan officer by the name of Leonas Juška-Kariūnas, who gradually revealed information like communicators, liaisons and other headquarter information. In exchange for freedom, Juška also agreed to participate in eliminating the rest of the partisans. The MGB often unsuccessfully tried to invite Morkūnas via letter to meet and discuss various partisan matters by using recruited former partisans. The agents succeeded in June 1953 in luring Morkūnas to the forest of Plauginiai. In the ensuing fight, Morkūnas was shot dead. His sister Juzefa Morkūnaitė-Lakštingala was also a partisan of the Prisikėlimas district who died on 9 August 1950.

== Remembrance ==
Morkūnas was posthumously awarded the Order of the Cross of Vytis, 3rd degree as well as the rank of colonel in 1999.

== See also ==
- Anti-Soviet partisans
- Forest Brothers
