= Petras Bartkus =

Lithuanian poet and anti-Soviet partisan

Colonel Petras Bartkus
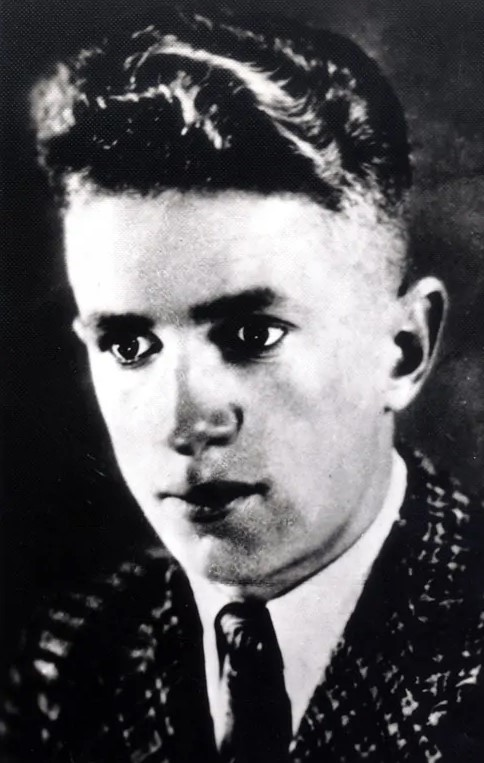

Commander of the Prisikėlimas military district
- In office 1 April 1948 – 26 July 1948
- Succeeded by: Leonardas Grigonis

Personal details
- Born: 30 May 1925 Pakapurnis, Raseiniai District Municipality, Republic of Lithuania
- Died: 13 August 1949 (aged 24) Užpelkiai forest, Radviliškis District Municipality, Lithuanian SSR
- Education: Kaunas higher technic school
- Occupation: Lithuanian partisan

Military service
- Allegiance: Lithuania
- Years of service: 1942 (Lithuanian Liberty Army); 1944-1949 (Lithuanian partisans)
- Rank: Colonel (1998; posthumous)

Petras Bartkus, also known by his codenames Žadgaila and Alkupėnas (30 May 1925 – 13 August 1949) was a poet and anti-Soviet Lithuanian partisan. He was one of the signatories of the Lithuanian Partisans Declaration of 16 February 1949, and the first commander of the partisan Prisikėlimas military district.

== Biography ==
=== Early life ===
Petras Bartkus was born on 30 May 1925 in the village of Pakapurnis of the Raseiniai district to Antanas Bartkus and Anastazija Bartkienė. In 1941 he was arrested for distributing illegal newspapers but was released as he was underage. He studied at the Kaunas higher technic school, and in 1942 he joined the resistance in the Lithuanian Liberty Army.

During the Soviet re-occupation of Lithuania in 1944 he organized partisans in the Kelmė area. He was a communicator for the local Vėgėlė unit and then staff member of the Žebenkštis unit, later renamed the Šernas unit, after which Bartkus became its leader. When the Kęstutis military district was established on 12 September 1946, Bartkus was made the head of its headquarters organizational unit (during which he gained the codename Sąžinė). Bartkus published the newspaper Laisvės Varpas. After the Kęstutis district lost its organizational capacity following intense raids, Bartkus was tasked by Jonas Žemaitis and his colleague Bronislovas Liesis to not only establish new communications but also to discuss the creation of a new military district.

=== Leadership ===
On 15 March 1948 a meeting took place that involved representatives from the district, as well as from the Voverė and Atžalynas units. On 31 March the Prisikėlimas military district was established and on 1 April Bartkus was selected as its commander (with the codename Mažrimas). The district at first consisted of the Voverė, Atžalynas, Žalioji and Povilas Lukšys units. Bartkus published the newspaper Prisikėlimo Ugnis. He also wrote poems under the pseudonym Alkupėnas. A collection of his poems was published in 1948. The press he published often involved themes of centralized resistance. When the West Lithuanian (Sea) Area of partisans was created in 1948 with Jonas Žemaitis as its head, Bartkus and another colleague were made Žemaitis's substitutes. Bartkus was the head of the Union of Lithuanian Freedom Fighters (LLKS) headquarters organizational division, and also the presidium secretary of the General Democratic Resistance Union, an organization set up by Soviet agent Juozas Markulis. On 21 November 1948 Bartkus was awarded the rank of major. Bartkus pariticpated in the partisan meeting in the village of Minaičiai, in which he was one of the signatories of the Lithuanian Partisans Declaration of 16 February 1949. He was also appointed as a presidium secretary of the LLKS. In the same year Bartkus was made the head of reconnaissance of the LLKS.

=== Death ===
Bartkus died on 13 August 1949 in a fight with MGB agents in the Užpelkiai forest in the Radviliškis district, along with Bronislovas Liesis (another signature of the 1949 declaration), Jonas Vytautas Šniuolis (a member of the LLKS presidium), and two unidentified others. Their bodies were driven to Radviliškis and buried there. On 25 September 1994 the bodies were exhumed and buried in the Radviliškis cemetery.

== Remembrance ==
In 1997 he was awarded the Order of the Cross of Vytis 1st degree. In 1998 he was awarded the rank of colonel.

== See also ==
- Anti-Soviet partisans
- Forest Brothers
