= Leonardas Grigonis =

Lithuanian teacher and anti-Soviet partisan

Colonel Leonardas Grigonis
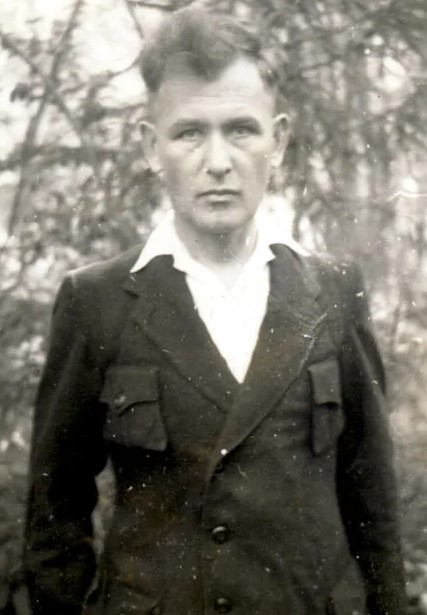

Commander of the Prisikėlimas military district
- In office 26 July 1948 – August 1948
- Preceded by: Petras Bartkus
- Succeeded by: Povilas Morkūnas

Personal details
- Born: 14 December 1905 Pužonys, Kovno Governorate, Russian Empire
- Died: 22 July 1950 (aged 44) Daugėliškiai forest, Raseiniai District Municipality, Lithuanian SSR
- Occupation: Lithuanian partisan

Military service
- Allegiance: Lithuania
- Years of service: 1944–1950 (Lithuanian partisans)
- Rank: Colonel (1998; posthumous)

Leonardas Grigonis, also widely known by his codename Užpalis (14 December 1905 – 22 July 1950) was a teacher and anti-Soviet Lithuanian partisan, and the second commander of their Prisikėlimas military district. He was a teacher around the Rokiškis area as well as an active member of the Lithuanian Riflemen's Union. Grigonis joined the partisans in 1944. He soon became the commander of the military district, also signing the Lithuanian Partisans Declaration of 16 February 1949. He was also known by his codenames Žvainys, Krivis, and Danys.

== Biography ==
=== Early life ===
Leonardas Grigonis was born on 14 December 1905 in the village of Pužonys in the Rokiškis district of Lithuania to Izidorius Grigonis and Marijona Ratkevičiūtė. She and her children moved to St. Petersburg during World War I, while Grigonis's father died in Lithuania. From 1919 Grigonis attended the Rokiškis gymnasium and also taught at the Paulenka primary school.

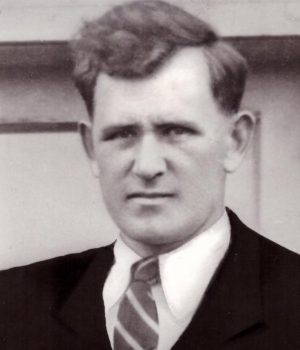
Leonardas Grigonis-Užpalis. Teacher and partisan.

=== Teaching career ===
After Lithuanian independence following World War I, local people received land from the former Tyzenhaus landowners. The newly settled village was named by Grigonis after the historical Selonians who inhabited the local area. From 1931 he was a teacher in the Sėlynė primary school. A new school was built in 1935 by Grigonis's initiative, however, it burned down in 1939. Grigonis took care of the rebuilding. During the German occupation of Lithuania during World War II funding for the construction was lackluster and Grigonis often paid out of his own pocket. The school was finished in 1942 and was active until 2003. During his time as a teacher, he was also the head of the local Riflemen's Union, a committee member of the riflemen of Rokiškis district, as well as a rifleman himself of the Sėlynė unit. He assisted in publishing the riflemen newspaper Trimitas. During the Soviet occupation of Lithuania in 1941, he and his mother were arrested and were set to be deported, however, Grigonis escaped. and Grigonis temporarily halted his teaching. He would continue his teaching up until 1944.

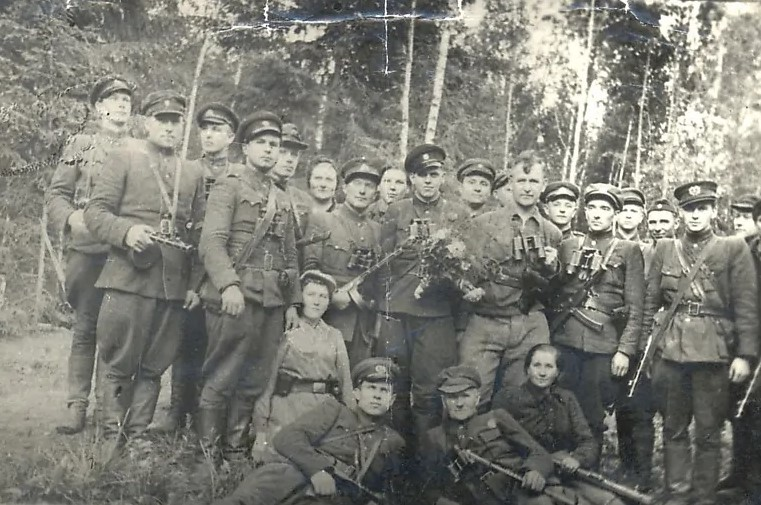
Partisans of the Prisikėlimas district with Leonardas Grigonis.

=== Partisanship ===
In 1944 he changed his surname to Užubalis and went into hiding. Initially people believed that he would immigrate abroad to the United States like his brothers Vytautas, who was an aviation officer and diplomat, and also Leopoldas, who lived there as well. However Grigonis joined the partisans of the Šiauliai area and in 1946 became a member of the Žalioji unit. Grigonis was a staff member of the Vytautas Didysis (later – Atžalynas) unit headquarters. He became the head of its information division in May 1945. At the establishment of the Prisikėlimas military district, Grigonis became chief of headquarters under Petras Bartkus. On 26 July 1948 he became the commander of the Prisikėlimas military district. He signed the Lithuanian Partisans Declaration of 16 February 1949 and soon was awarded the Cross of the Freedom Fight, 3rd degree. On 30 May 1950 the presidium of the Union of Lithuanian Freedom Fighters (LLKS) awarded Grigonis the rank of lieutenant colonel. From 31 July 1949 Grigonis was also a deputy for the chairman of the LLKS presidium Jonas Žemaitis.

=== Death ===
Grigonis fell ill with pneumonia in 1950 and required medical attention. Partisan communicator Marytė Pranevičiūtė, who often brought Grigonis aid, was caught by Cheka agents and under interrogation revealed the location of Grigonis's bunker. He died on 22 July 1950 in the ensuing fight near the forest of Daugėliškiai of the Raseiniai district.

== Remembrance ==
A day after his death he was posthumously awarded the Cross of the Freedom Fight, 1st and 2nd degrees by the order of the LLKS presidium. In 1996 the Sėlynė primary school was named after Leonardas Grigonis. In 1998 he was awarded the Order of the Cross of Vytis 1st degree, as well as the rank of colonel.

== See also ==
- Anti-Soviet partisans
- Forest Brothers
