= Girkalnis Eldership =

Eldership of Lithuania

The Girkalnis Eldership (Lithuanian: Girkalnio seniūnija) is an eldership of Lithuania, located in the Raseiniai District Municipality. In 2021 its population was 1381.
