= Prisikėlimas military district =

The Prisikėlimas military district (Lithuanian: Prisikėlimo apygarda; "Resurrection district") was a military district of Lithuanian partisans which were active from 1947 to 1969, and comprised the counties of Šiauliai, Joniškis, and partially - Kėdainiai, Panevėžys and Raseiniai. It formed out of the Kęstutis military district as managing its wide area presented difficulties. The newly created district prioritized connections with other partisan districts as well as the protection of partisan leadership.

== History ==
=== Formation ===
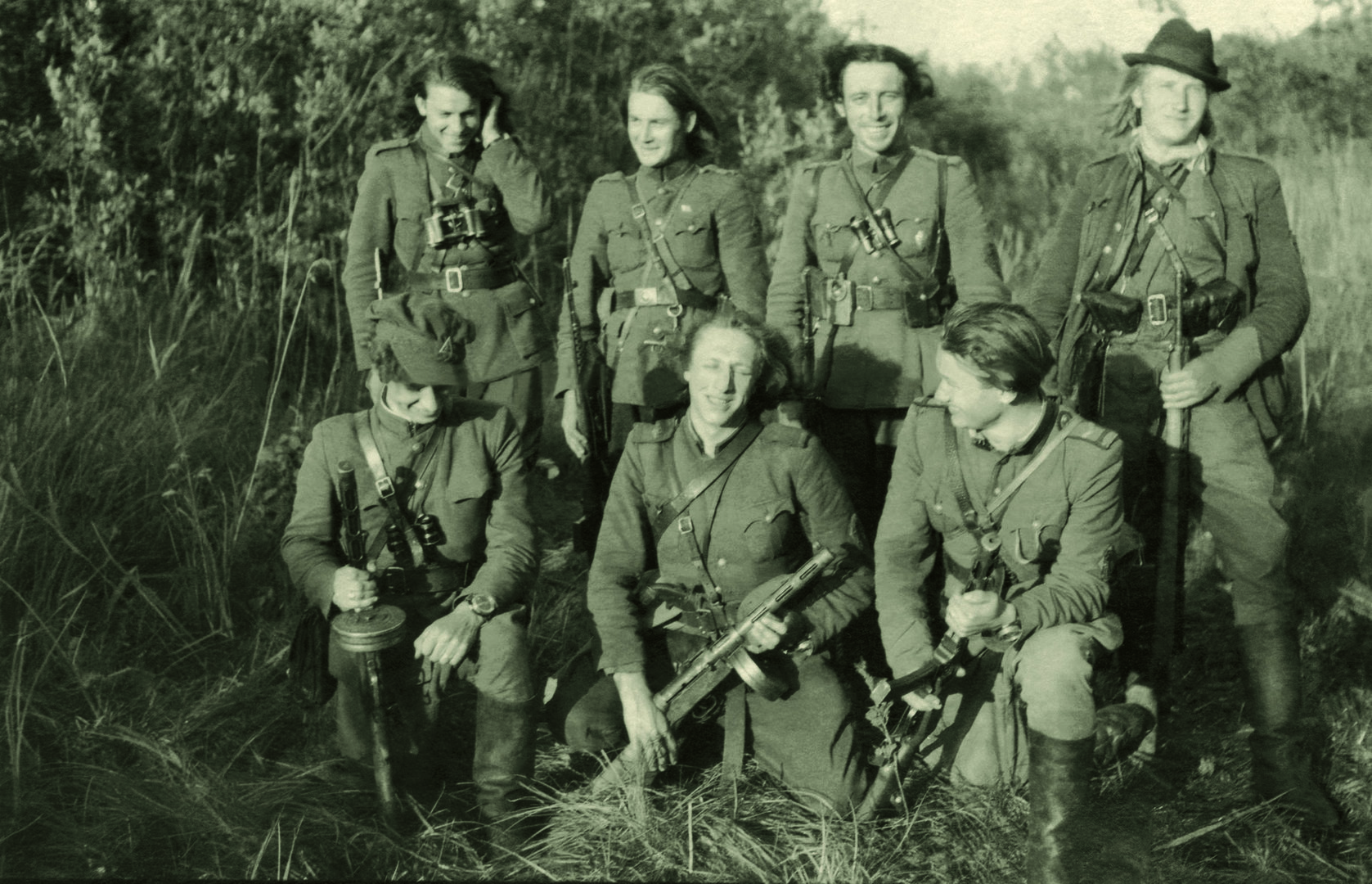
Partisans of the district in 1950

As the front between Nazi Germany and the Soviet Union was moving back towards Lithuania, multiple resistance organizations were established. On 16 July 1944 Motiejus Pečulionis, a representative of the Supreme Committee for the Liberation of Lithuania, arrived in the city of Šiauliai to seek connection with underground resistance movements, primarily with the Lithuanian Liberty Army (LLA). The following day he ordered members of the army to retreat with the front but to stay and organize partisan resistance if the Soviet Union should stay and occupy Lithuania. The LLA intended to form four districts within the country. The district of Šiauliai at first was named the Saturnas (Saturn) district and its leader was selected as lieutenant Adolfas Eidimtas. He assumed leadership of the LLA after its creator, Kazys Veverskis, died on 28 December 1944. Although the headquarters of the Saturnas district was established in 1945, after which Eidimtas attempted to establish connections with its Vilnius counterpart, it did not last long and was destroyed. Despite this failed attempt, independent partisan cells were still being formed. From 1946 to 1947 these cells gradually were incorporated into the Kęstutis military district. Due to the district's large span and other organizational reasons, it was decided that the area should split into a new district on 8 August 1947. Jonas Žemaitis, the commander of the Kęstutis military district, sent Petras Bartkus and Bronius Liesis to establish connections with the fallen local headquarters and gather the partisans. The chief of staff of the headquarters was selected to be Leonardas Grigonis.

=== Activity ===
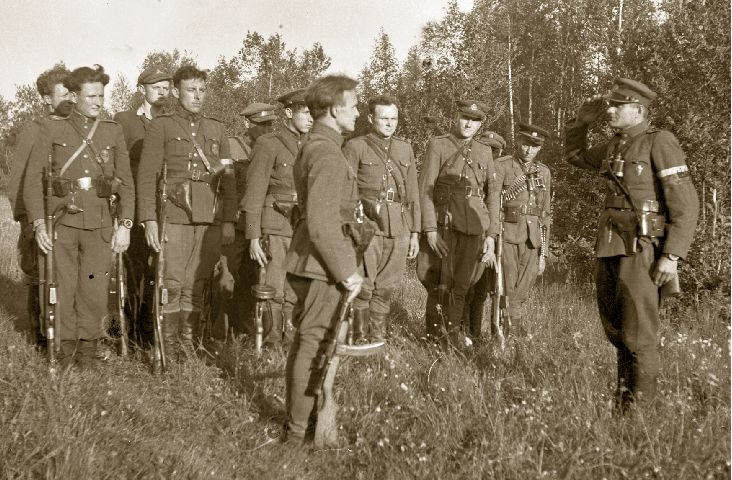
Partisans of the Maironis unit in 1949

At a meeting that took place on 22 April the Žalioji unit was incorporated into the district. Bartkus began regularly inspecting the partisans of the newly formed district. When the Povilas Lukšys unit became severely weakened due to MGB attacks, its new leader Povilas Morkūnas was set to re-establish discipline. Morkūnas divided the district into smaller subdivisions, as well as renamed it to the Maironis district. On 29 April it was incorporated into the Prisikėlimas military district. Other units, such as the Atžalynas and Voverė (later - duke Žvelgaitis) were also later incorporated into the district. Petras Bartkus was replaced by Leonardas Grigonis after Bartkus was selected as the head of the Unified Freedom Fight Union Organization. Despite the district lacking in partisan press in the beginning, it managed to publish its own newspaper Prisikėlimo Ugnis (Fire of the resurrection), first in 1948. Due to the district's favorable strategic position, Jonas Žemaitis relocated to a forest within its area. The district prioritized connections with other districts as well as security of high-profile partisans. Žemaitis also met with partisan leaders from southern Lithuania like Adolfas Ramanauskas. In 1949 leaders shifted again as Povilas Morkūnas replaced Leonardas Grigonis, who headed the district until 1951. In May 1952 he ordered the district to be destroyed as it was severely weakened. Juozas Paliūnas became the last commander of the district on 1 August 1951. He headed the Povilas Lukšys unit until his death on 1 October 1952. The last high-profile partisan of the district, Pranciškus Prūsaitis, was captured in 1962 and executed in Vilnius in 1963. The last partisan of the area, Kostas Liuberskis, was killed in 1969.

== Leaders ==
| Name | Nom de guerre | Since | Until |
|---|---|---|---|
| Petras Bartkus | Žadgaila | 1948 April 1 | 1948 July 26 |
| Leonardas Grigonis | Užpalis | 1948 July 26 | 1949 August |
| Povilas Morkūnas | Rimantas | 1949 August 1 | 1951 August 2 |
| Juozas Paliūnas | Rytas | 1951 August 1 | 1952 May 20 |

== Structure of Lithuanian partisans' organisation ==
LLKS
Western Lithuania (Jūra) region | Southern Lithuania (Nemunas) region | Eastern Lithuania (King Mindaugas) region
Žemaičiai military district | Prisikėlimas military district | Kęstutis military district | Tauras military district | Dainava military district | Algimantas military district | Vytautas military district | Vytis military district | Didžioji Kova military district
Alka | Maironis | Vaidotas | Vytautas | Dzūkai | Žalioji | Tigras | Krikštaponis
Šatrija | Duke Žvelgaitis | Birutė | Žalgiris | Šarūnas | Šarūnas | Liūtas | Briedis
Kardas | Juozapavičius | Butageidis | Geležinis vilkas | Kazimieraitis | Duke Margiris | Lokys
Lietuvos žalioji
