= Povilas Lukšys =

Povilas Lukšys may refer to:

- Povilas Lukšys (soldier), the first Lithuanian soldier to die in the Lithuanian Wars of Independence.
- Povilas Lukšys (footballer), a footballer born in 1979.
