= Paliepiai Eldership =

Eldership of Lithuania

The Paliepiai Eldership (Lithuanian: Paliepių seniūnija) is an eldership of Lithuania, located in the Raseiniai District Municipality. In 2021 its population was 1,518.
