= Burbiškiai Manor (Raseiniai) =

Coordinates: 55°21′47″N 23°20′45″E

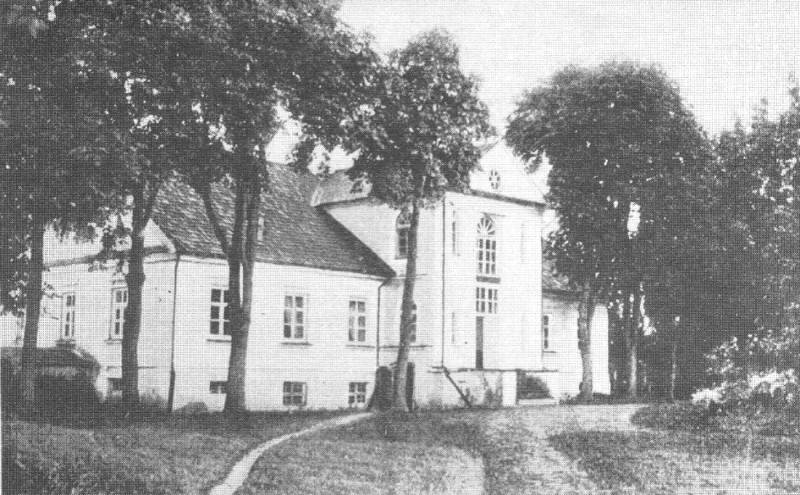
- Burbiškiai Manor (about 1939)
- Interactive map of the Burbiškiai Manor area

General information
- Type: Residential manor
- Location: Burbiškiai, Lithuania

Burbiškiai Manor is a former residential manor in Burbiškiai village, Raseiniai district in Lithuania.

The Main manor building, Two of three outbuildings, park fragments and manor cemetery have been conserved. Burbiškiai Manor is famous for its annual flowers festival.
