= Viduklė Eldership =

Eldership of Lithuania

The Viduklė Eldership (Lithuanian: Viduklės seniūnija) is an eldership of Lithuania, located in the Raseiniai District Municipality. In 2021 its population was 2950.
