= Pagojukai Eldership =

Eldership of Lithuania

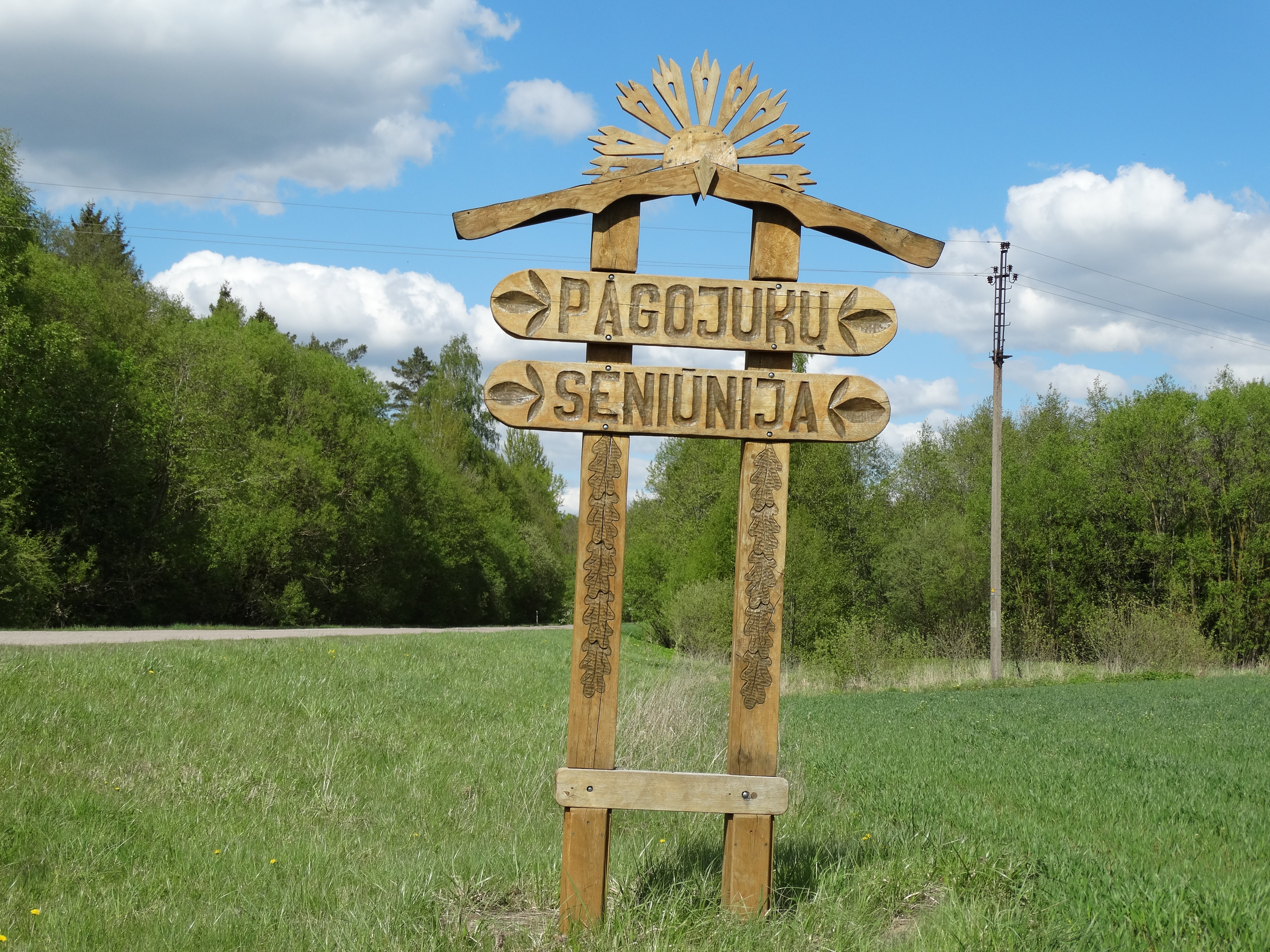
Pagojukai eldership sign, Raseiniai District, Lithuania

The Pagojukai Eldership (Lithuanian: Pagojukų seniūnija) is an eldership of Lithuania, located in the Raseiniai District Municipality. In 2021 its population was 1215.
