= Kalnujai Eldership =

Eldership of Lithuania

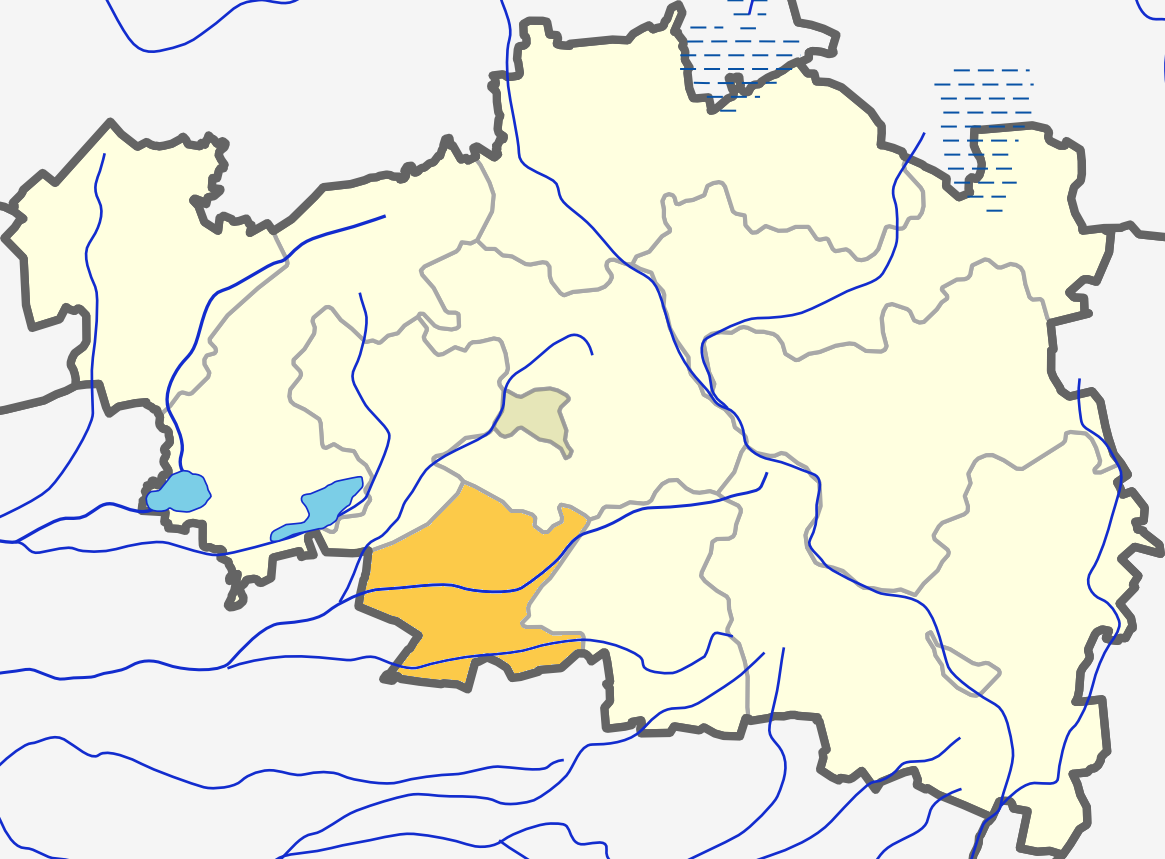

The Kalnujai Eldership (Lithuanian: Kalnujų seniūnija) is an eldership of Lithuania, located in the Raseiniai District Municipality. In 2021 its population was 836.
