= Taučiūnai =

- Village
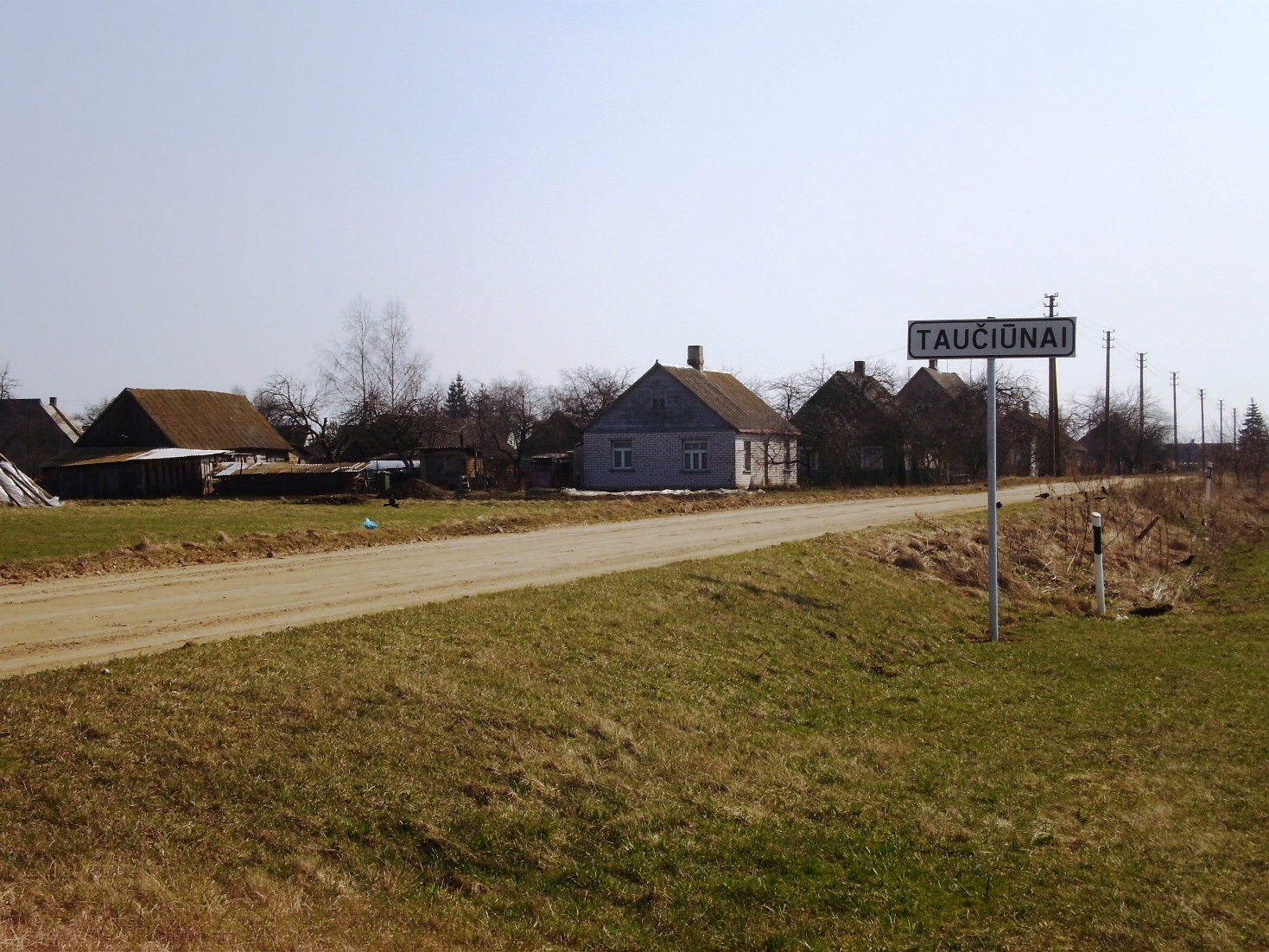

- Location in Lithuania Taučiūnai (Lithuania)
- Coordinates: 55°16′59″N 24°03′11″E
- Country: Lithuania
- County: Kaunas County
- Municipality: Kėdainiai district municipality
- Eldership: Vilainiai Eldership

Population (2011)
  - Total: 60
- Time zone: UTC+2 (EET)
  - Summer (DST): UTC+3 (EEST)

Taučiūnai (formerly Russian: Тавчуны, Polish: Tauczuny, Tawczuny) is a village in Kėdainiai district municipality, in Kaunas County, in central Lithuania. According to the 2011 census, the village had a population of 60 people. It is located 2 kilometres (1.2 mi) from Aristava, close to the A8 highway, on the shore of the Juodkiškiai Reservoir. There is a monument for the first Lithuanian volunteer soldier Povilas Lukšys, who died near Taučiūnai in 1919.

== History ==
Taučiūnai has been known since 1375. There was a manor till the mid-20th century. The Taučiūnai folwark belonged to the Medekšos and the Vyšniauskai families.

== Demography ==
Historical population

Year	Pop.	±% p.a.
1902	109	—
1923	166	+2.02%
1959	182	+0.26%
1970	192	+0.49%
1979	156	−2.28%

Year	Pop.	±% p.a.
1987	137	−1.61%
1989	112	−9.58%
2001	99	−1.02%
2011	60	−4.88%

Source: 1902, 1923, 1959 & 1970, 1979, 1989, 2001, 2011

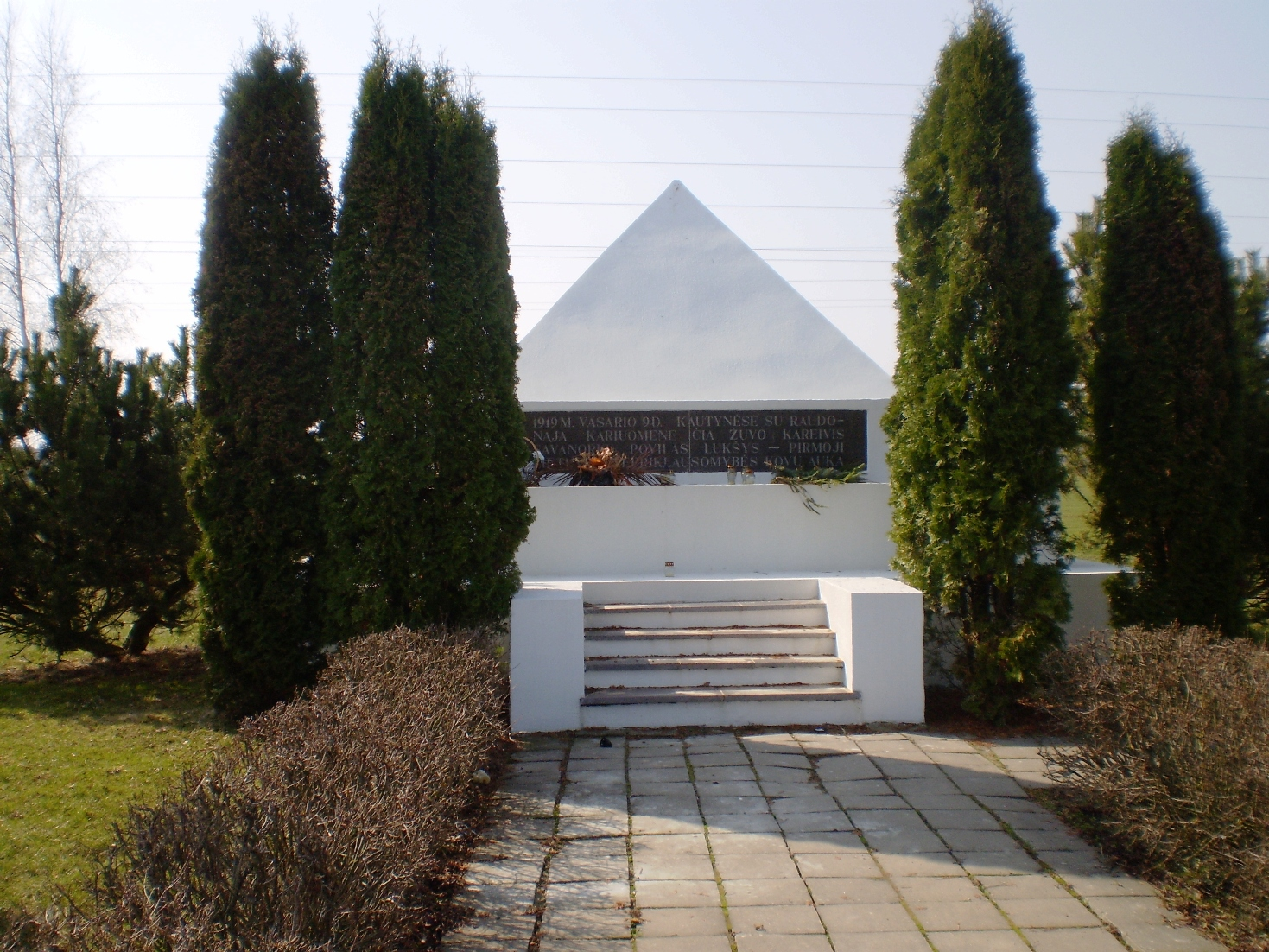
Monument for Povilas Lukšys

== Bibliography ==
- Mockienė, Jurgita (24 January 2023) [2018]. "Povilas Lukšys". Visuotinė lietuvių enciklopedija (in Lithuanian). Mokslo ir enciklopedijų leidybos centras.
