= Juodkiškiai Reservoir =

Reservoir in Lithuania

- Juodkiškių tvenkinys (Lithuanian)
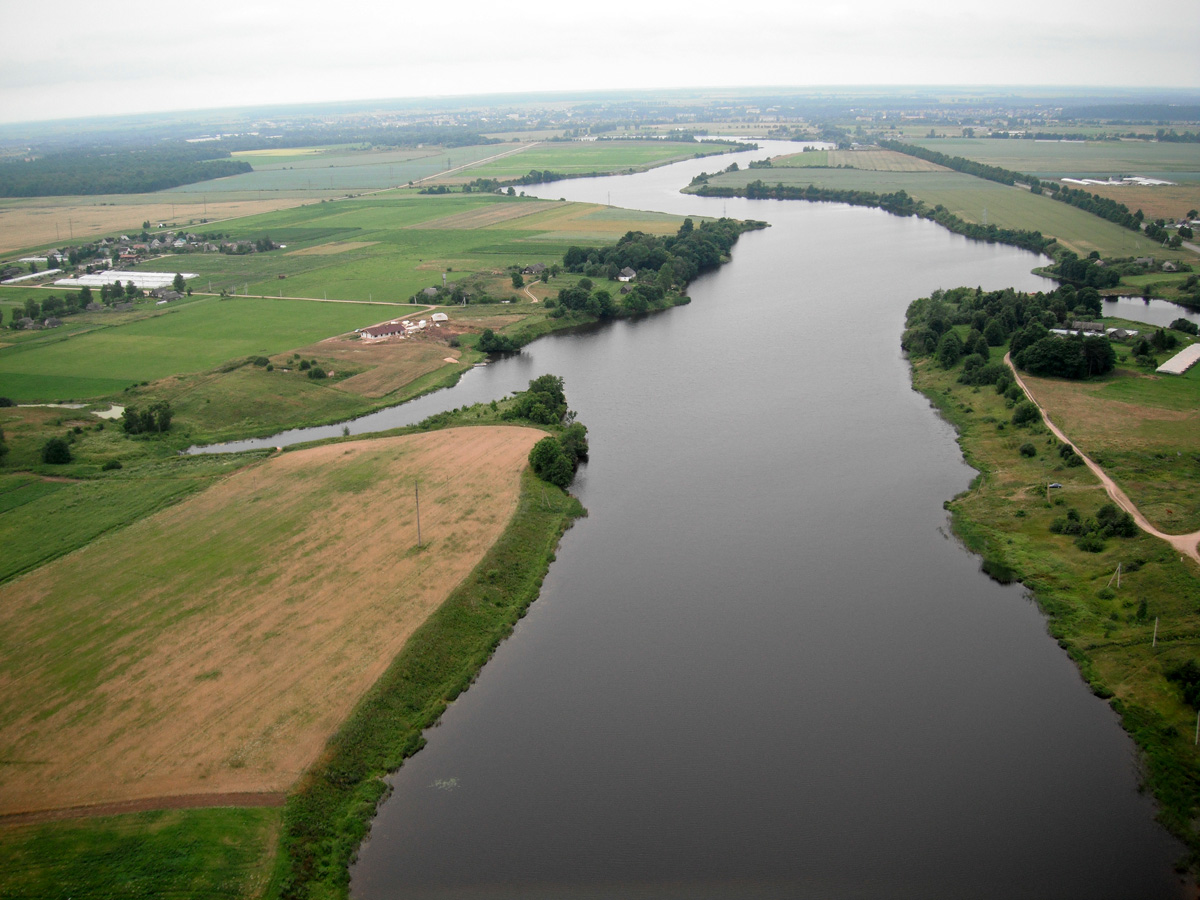
- Juodkiškiai Reservoir between Aristava and Taučiūnai

- Location within Lithuania Location within Kėdainiai District Municipality
- Location: Kėdainiai District Municipality, Lithuania
- Coordinates: 55°17′17″N 24°02′28″E
- Part of: Obelis→ Nevėžis→ Neman→ Baltic Sea
- Primary inflows: Obelis, Malčius, Koliupė
- Primary outflows: Obelis
- First flooded: 1980
- Max. length: 3.85 km (2.39 mi)
- Max. width: 0.32 km (0.20 mi)
- Surface area: 0.834 km^{2} (0.322 sq mi)
- Average depth: 4.6 m (15 ft)
- Max. depth: 12 m (39 ft)
- Water volume: 0.004395 km^{3} (0.001054 cu mi)
- Shore length^{1}: 15.2 km (9.4 mi)
- Surface elevation: 43 m (141 ft)
- Settlements: Taučiūnai, Koliupė
- ^{1} Shore length is not a well-defined measure.

The Juodkiškiai Reservoir is an artificial lake in Kėdainiai District Municipality, central Lithuania. It is located 2 kilometres (1.2 mi) east from Kėdainiai, next to Taučiūnai village. It was created in 1980, when a dam on the Obelis river was built next to Juodkiškiai hamlet. In 1995, the dam was reconstructed and a small hydroelectric plant (of 510 kW) built.

Shores of the reservoir are low; agriculture lands stretch around the lake. The Bubliai Reservoir and some smaller reservoirs (the Koliupė Reservoir, the Malčius Reservoir) empty into the Juodkiškiai Reservoir. The A8 highway crosses the lake.

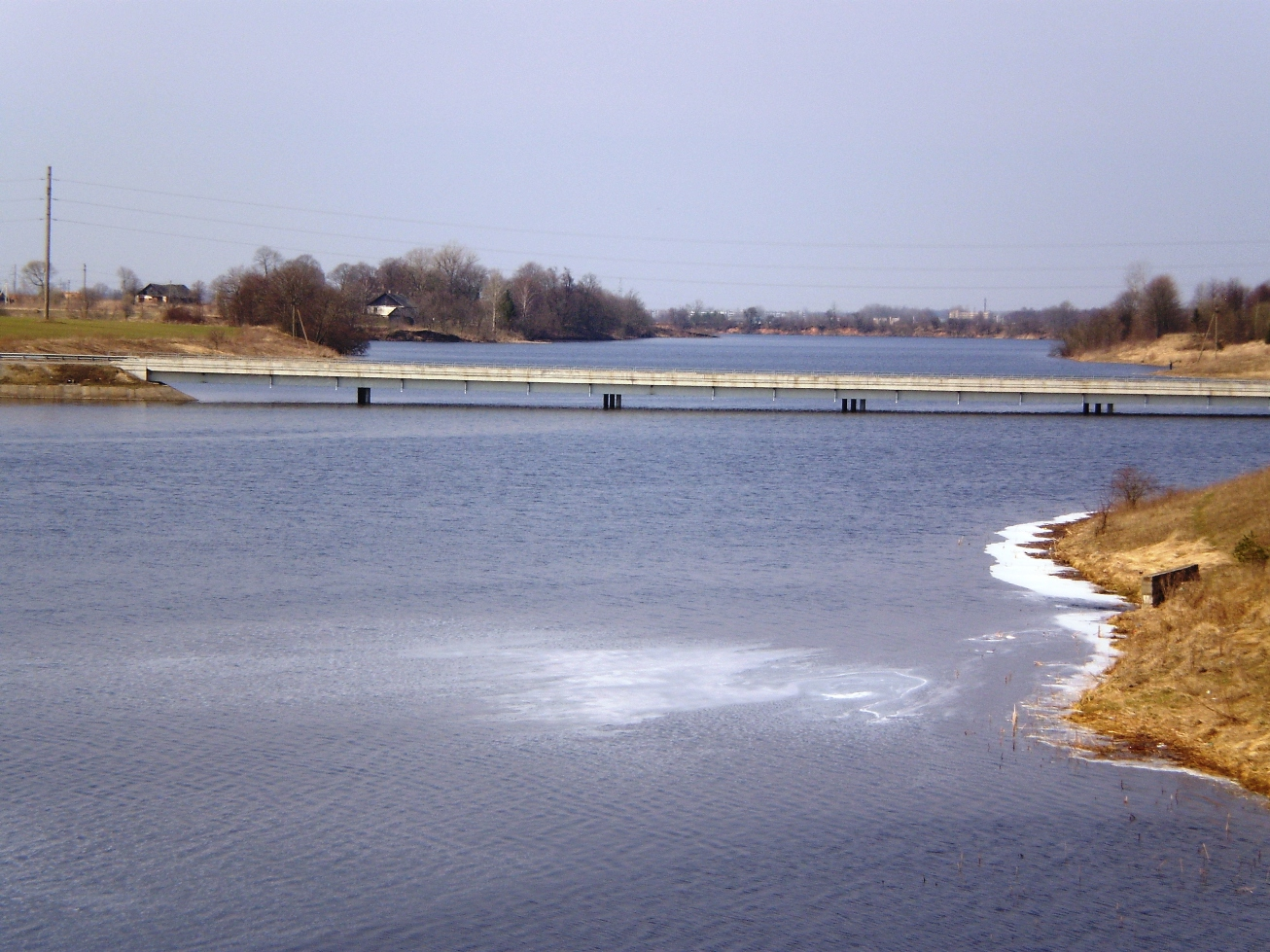
The A8 highway bridge over the Juodkiškiai Reservoir
