= Juodkiškiai, Kėdainiai =

Juodkiškiai
- Hamlet
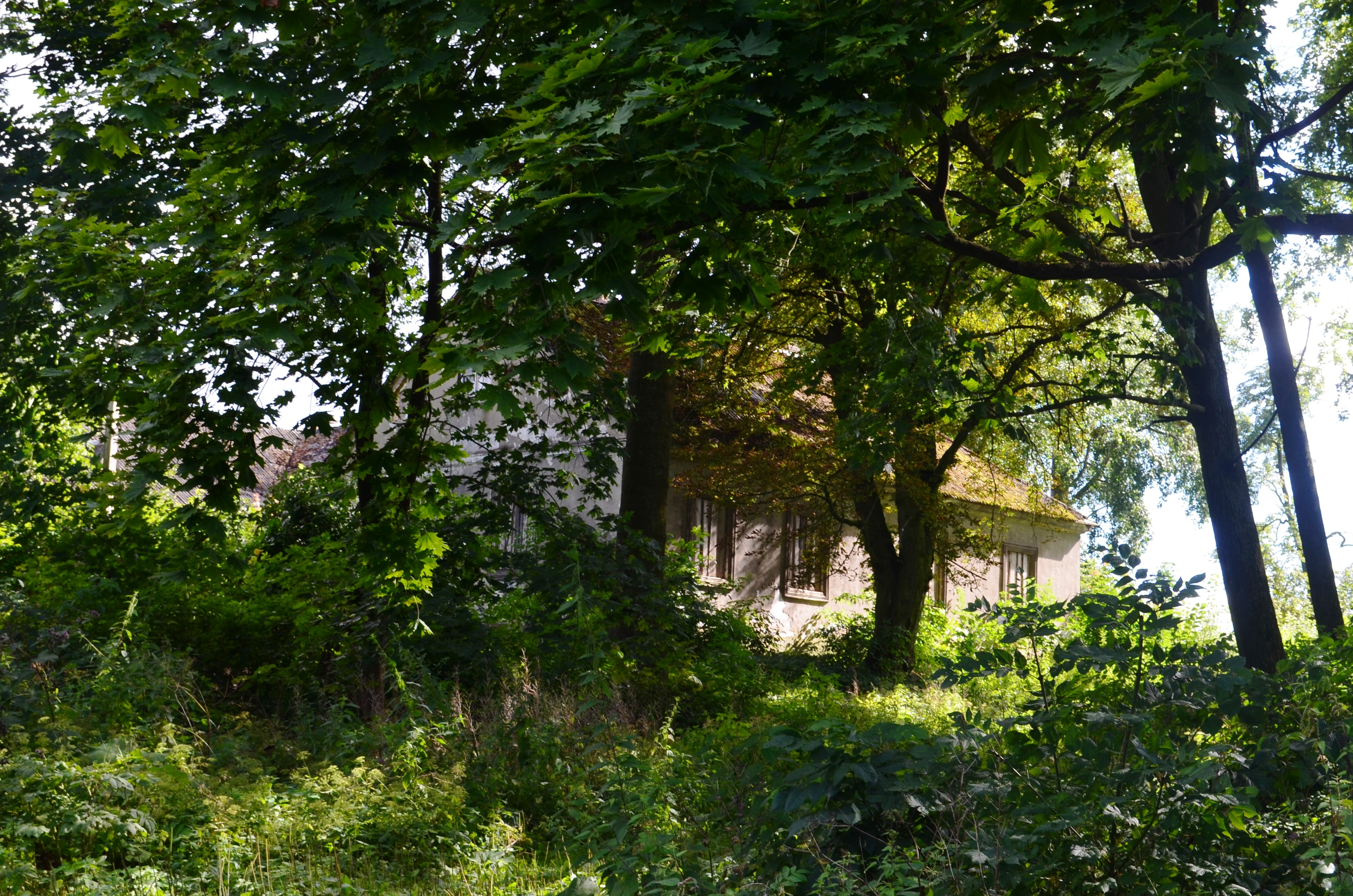

- Location in Lithuania Juodkiškiai (Lithuania)
- Coordinates: 55°17′10″N 24°01′08″E
- Country: Lithuania
- County: Kaunas County
- Municipality: Kėdainiai district municipality
- Eldership: Vilainiai Eldership

Population (2011)
  - Total: 0
- Time zone: UTC+2 (EET)
  - Summer (DST): UTC+3 (EEST)

Juodkiškiai (formerly Russian: Іодкишки, Polish: Jodkiszki) is a hamlet in Kėdainiai district municipality, in Kaunas County, in central Lithuania. According to the 2011 census, the hamlet was uninhabited.

== Location ==
It is located next to the eastern limit of Kėdainiai city, by the Obelis river and the Juodkiškiai Reservoir.

== History ==
At the end of the 19th century, it was a folwark and watermill (built in 1859) of the Wędziagołski family. It was shortly a selsovet center during the Soviet era. The main part of the developing village was merged with Kėdainiai in the 1970s (nowadays the Juodkiškiai Street).

== Demography ==
Historical population

Year	Pop.	±% p.a.
1902	91	—
1923	83	−0.44%
1959	174	+2.08%
1970	150	−1.34%

Year	Pop.	±% p.a.
1979	15	−22.57%
1989	3	−14.87%
2001	3	+0.00%
2011	0	−100.00%

Source: 1902, 1923, 1959 & 1970, 1979, 1989, 2001, 2011
