= Koliupė =

- Village
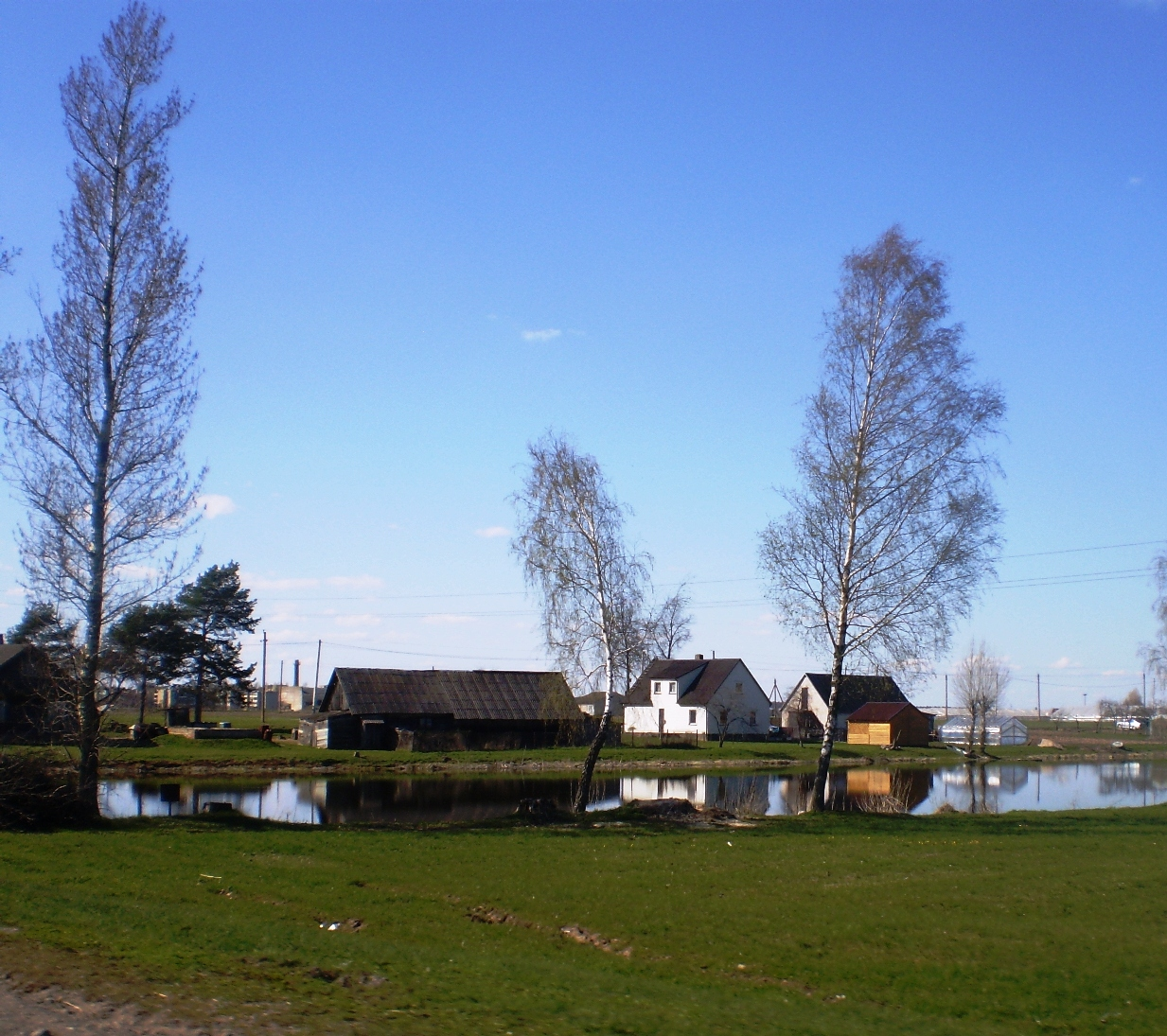

- Location in Lithuania Koliupė (Lithuania)
- Coordinates: 55°18′00″N 24°01′01″E
- Country: Lithuania
- County: Kaunas County
- Municipality: Kėdainiai district municipality
- Eldership: Vilainiai Eldership

Population (2011)
  - Total: 30
- Time zone: UTC+2 (EET)
  - Summer (DST): UTC+3 (EEST)

Koliupė (formerly Russian: Колюпи, Кулупяй, Polish: Kolupie) is a village in Kėdainiai district municipality, in Kaunas County, in central Lithuania. According to the 2011 census, the village had a population of 30 people. It is located 1 kilometre (0.62 mi) from Vilainiai, on the shore of the Juodkiškiai Reservoir and the Koliupė rivulet.

== Demography ==
Historical population

Year	Pop.	±% p.a.
1902	37	—
1923	48	+1.25%
1959	41	−0.44%
1970	51	+2.00%

Year	Pop.	±% p.a.
1979	30	−5.73%
1989	24	−2.21%
2001	25	+0.34%
2011	30	+1.84%

Source: 1902, 1923, 1959 & 1970, 1979, 1989, 2001, 2011
