= Padotnuvys =

- Village
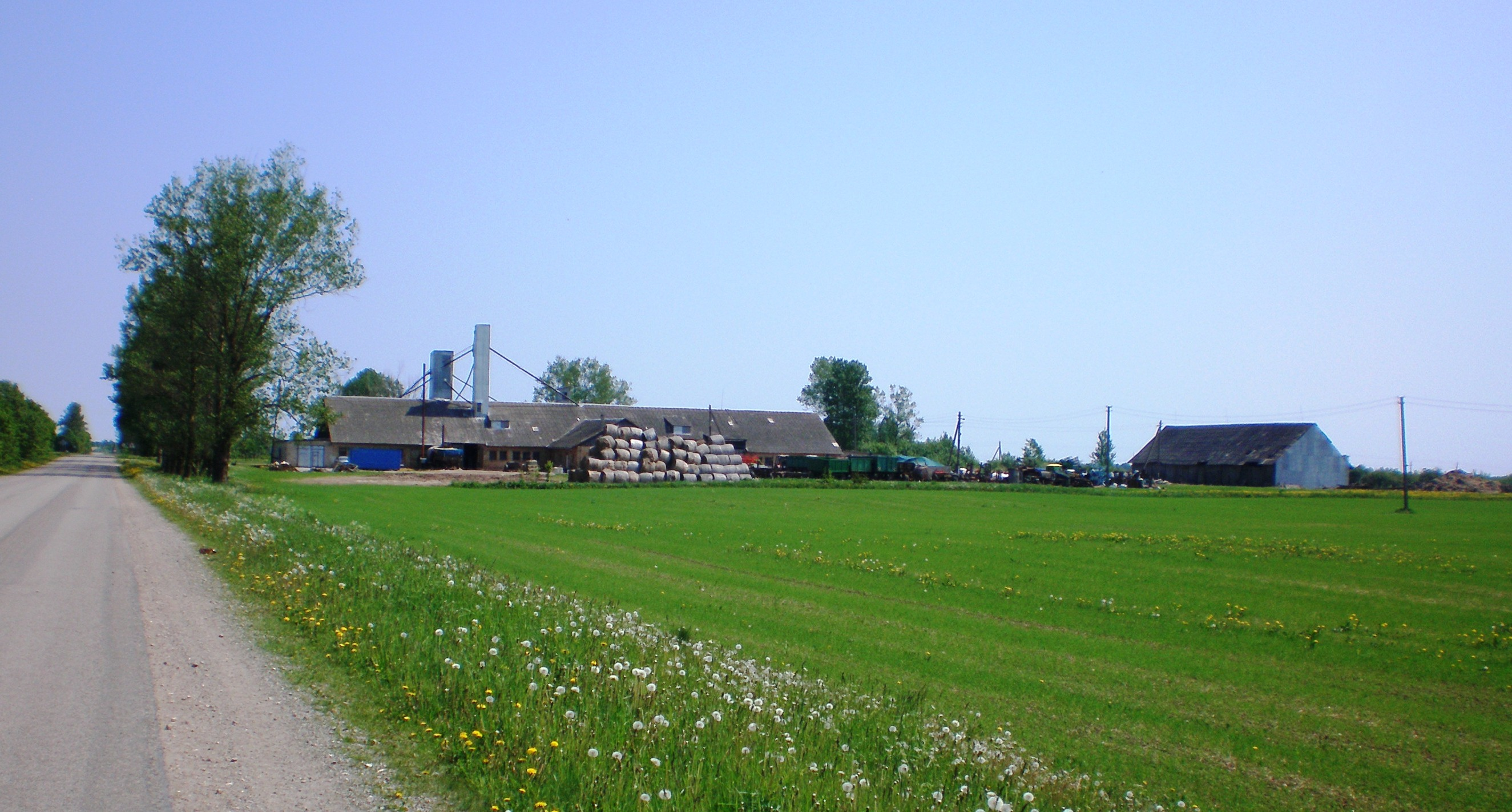

- Location in Lithuania
- Coordinates: 55°24′40″N 23°49′01″E
- Country: Lithuania
- County: Kaunas County
- Municipality: Kėdainiai district municipality
- Eldership: Dotnuva Eldership

Population (2011)
  - Total: 20
- Time zone: UTC+2 (EET)
  - Summer (DST): UTC+3 (EEST)

Padotnuvys is a village in Kėdainiai district municipality, in Kaunas County, in central Lithuania. According to the 2011 census, the village has a population of 20 people. It is located 5 km (3.1 mi) from Dotnuva, by the Želtupys and Skroblė rivulets.

== Demography ==
Historical population

Year	Pop.	±% p.a.
1959	133	—
1970	120	−0.93%
1979	64	−6.75%

Year	Pop.	±% p.a.
1989	27	−8.27%
2001	55	+6.11%
2011	20	−9.62%

Source: 1902, 1923, 1959 & 1970, 1979, 1989, 2001, 2011
