= Lithuanian Partisans Declaration of February 16, 1949 =

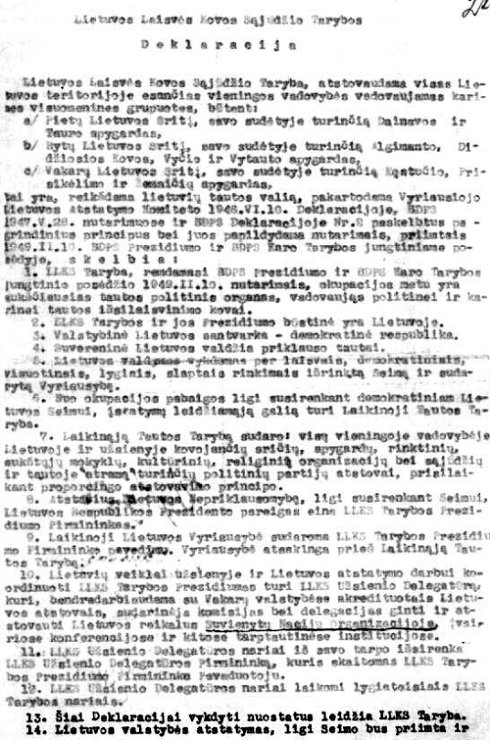
February 16, 1949 Declaration by Union of Lithuanian Freedom Fighters

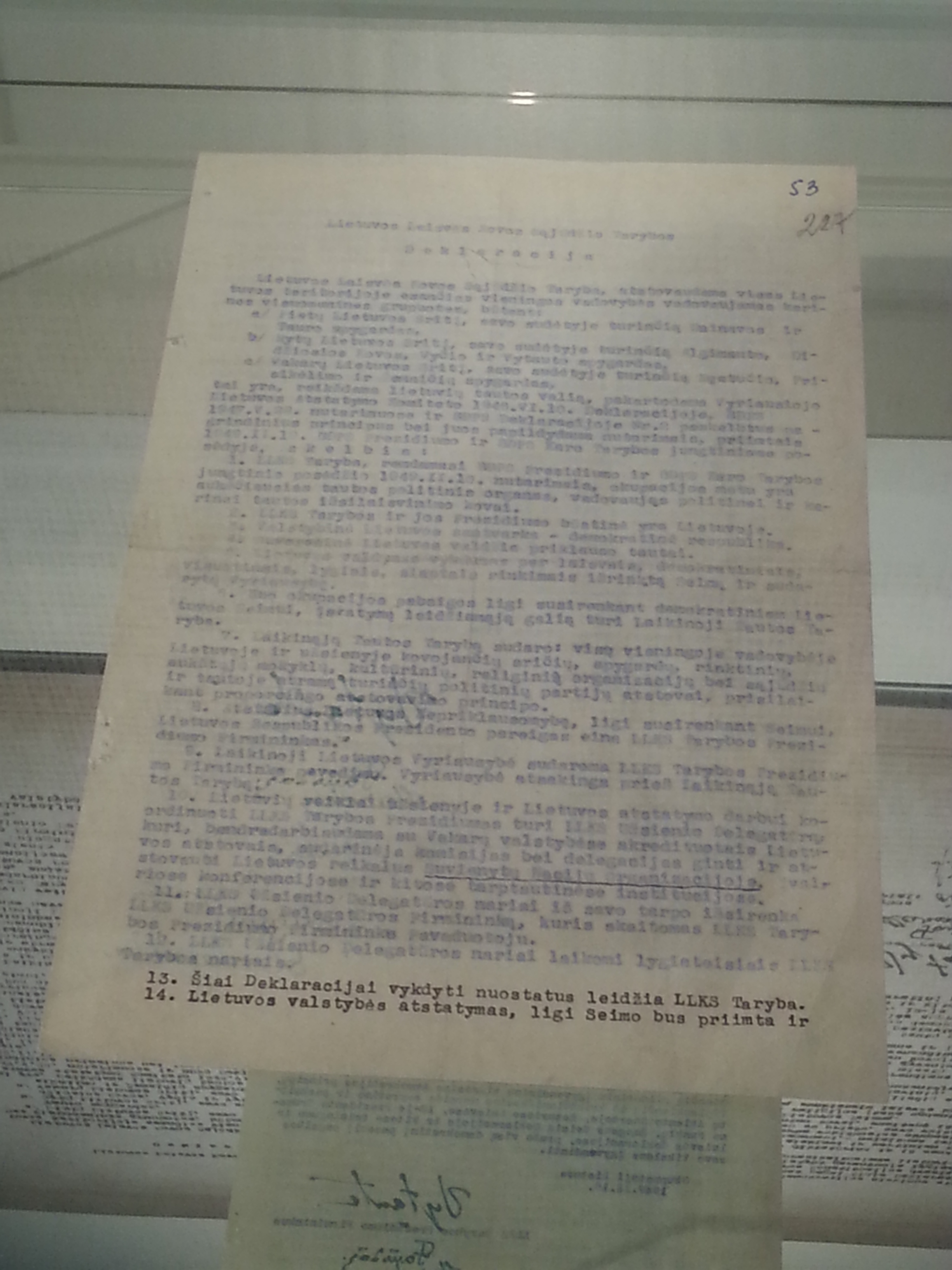
Original of the Declaration

Lithuanian Partisans Declaration of February 16, 1949 (Lithuanian: Lietuvos laisvės kovos sąjūdžio deklaracija) is a document created by Lithuanian partisans and signed by the Union of Lithuanian Freedom Fighters (ULFF) on February 16, 1949, in Minaičiai (Radviliškis District Municipality). By signing the declaration, the ULFF assumed responsibility for leading the restoration of an independent democratic state of Lithuania, where equal rights for all citizens and social care would be guaranteed. The document also states that the "Communist party, as dictatorial and essentially opposite to the main aim of Lithuanian nation and keystone provision of the Constitution – independence of Lithuania, – is not considered a legal party". The declaration appeals to the Universal Declaration of Human Rights, Lithuanian Constitution of 1922 and addresses the whole democratic world in asking for help.

== Historical background ==
Lithuania was occupied by the Soviet Union in June 1940. The new Soviet regime began the process of forceful Sovietization – suppression of the opposition, nationalization of property, mass arrests of "enemies of the people", and deportation about 17,000 people during the June deportation. When Germany invaded the Soviet Union in June 1941, Lithuania came under the German control for about three years. In July–October 1944, as Red Army continued to push Germans westward in the Operation Bagration and Baltic Offensive, the Soviet Union occupied Lithuania again and reintroduced harsh Sovietization policies – drafting of men into the Red Army, arrests of anyone suspected of anti-Soviet attitudes, mass deportations to Siberia, nationalization of property, forced formation of collective farms, etc. Lithuanians formed the first armed resistance groups in summer 1944. The Lithuanian partisans, numbering about 30,000 at the end of 1945, organized themselves into units and districts. The process of consolidation continued and the ultimate goal was to establish a joint political and military authority of the armed resistance.

== Meeting in Minaičiai ==
In February 1949, a meeting of partisan leaders took place in the bunker in Minaičiai (Radviliškis District Municipality). Eight partisans represented all the partisan units. During the first meeting, the name of the organization was approved—the Union of Lithuanian Freedom Fighters and the leadership was formed unanimously. Žemaitis-Vytautas became the Chairman of the Presidium of the Union's Council (posthumously he was awarded the rank of Brigade General), Šibaila-Merainis was appointed the Head of the Union's public affairs, and Liesys-Naktis was named the Head of the Union's Public Relations Department. The resolutions mentioned in the minutes of the meetings foresaw the organizational structure of the movement and leadership, the tactics of activities, relations within the organization and with local people. The Union's political program was presented by its author Šibaila-Merainis. The program, which consisted of 12 articles, stressed that the ultimate goal of the fight was the restoration of the Lithuanian parliamentary republic of 1920–1926.

On the occasion of the anniversary of the February 16 independence of Lithuania, the Council signed the political declaration. It stated that the Council of the Union of Lithuanian Freedom Fighters was the highest political body of the nation. Together with other documents passed at the meeting, the Declaration provided the legal and political basis for the Lithuanian armed resistance, ensured a new format of freedom fighting, and legitimized the Union as an organized armed resistance to the Soviet occupation and its council as the sole legitimate authority in the territory of the occupied country. The participants also adopted the motto of the movement: “Atiduok Tėvynei, ką privalai” [Give the Homeland What You Must Give!].

It was the only general meeting of the leaders. As the situation in the country had worsened, the number of supporters of the resistance movement had diminished. It became increasingly difficult to get in touch not only with the area headquarters but also groups of partisans in the vicinity. More and more partisans were killed or arrested.

== Signatories of the declaration ==
Four of the eight signatories were teachers, two were students, one was an officer, and one was an accountant.

Name	Codename	Pre-war occupation	Partisan command	Date of birth	Date of death	Manner of death
Jonas Žemaitis	Vytautas	Military officer	Chairman of the Presidium of the Union's Council	March 15, 1909	November 26, 1954	Shot dead in the Butyrka prison in Moscow
Adolfas Ramanauskas	Vanagas	Teacher, reserve officer	First Deputy Chairman of the Presidium; Commander of the Southern Lithuania Region	March 6, 1918	November 29, 1957	Shot dead in the KGB prison in Vilnius
Juozas Šibaila	Merainis	Teacher	Second Deputy Chairman of the Presidium; Commander of the Didžioji Kova Military District	March 18, 1905	February 11, 1953	Killed in Dovydai forest, Ramygala Volost
Leonas Grigonis	Užpalis	Teacher	Third Deputy Chairman of the Presidium; Commander of the Prisikėlimas Military District	December 14, 1905	July 22, 1950	Killed in Daugėliškės forest, Ariogala Volost
Aleksandras Grybinas	Faustas	Teacher	Commander of the Tauras Military District	September 20, 1920	September 28, 1949	Killed in Šunkariai forest, Šakiai County
Vytautas Gužas	Kardas	Accountant	Commander of the West Lithuania Region	January 2, 1920	June 11, 1949	Killed in the village of Smaidriai, Tauragė County
Bronius Liesys	Naktis	Student	Chief of the Prisikėlimas Military District	April 16, 1922	August 13, 1949	Killed in Užpelkiai forest, Radviliškis District
Petras Bartkus	Žadgaila	Student	Secretary of the Presidium	May 30, 1925	August 13, 1949	Killed in Užpelkiai forest, Radviliškis District

== Legacy ==
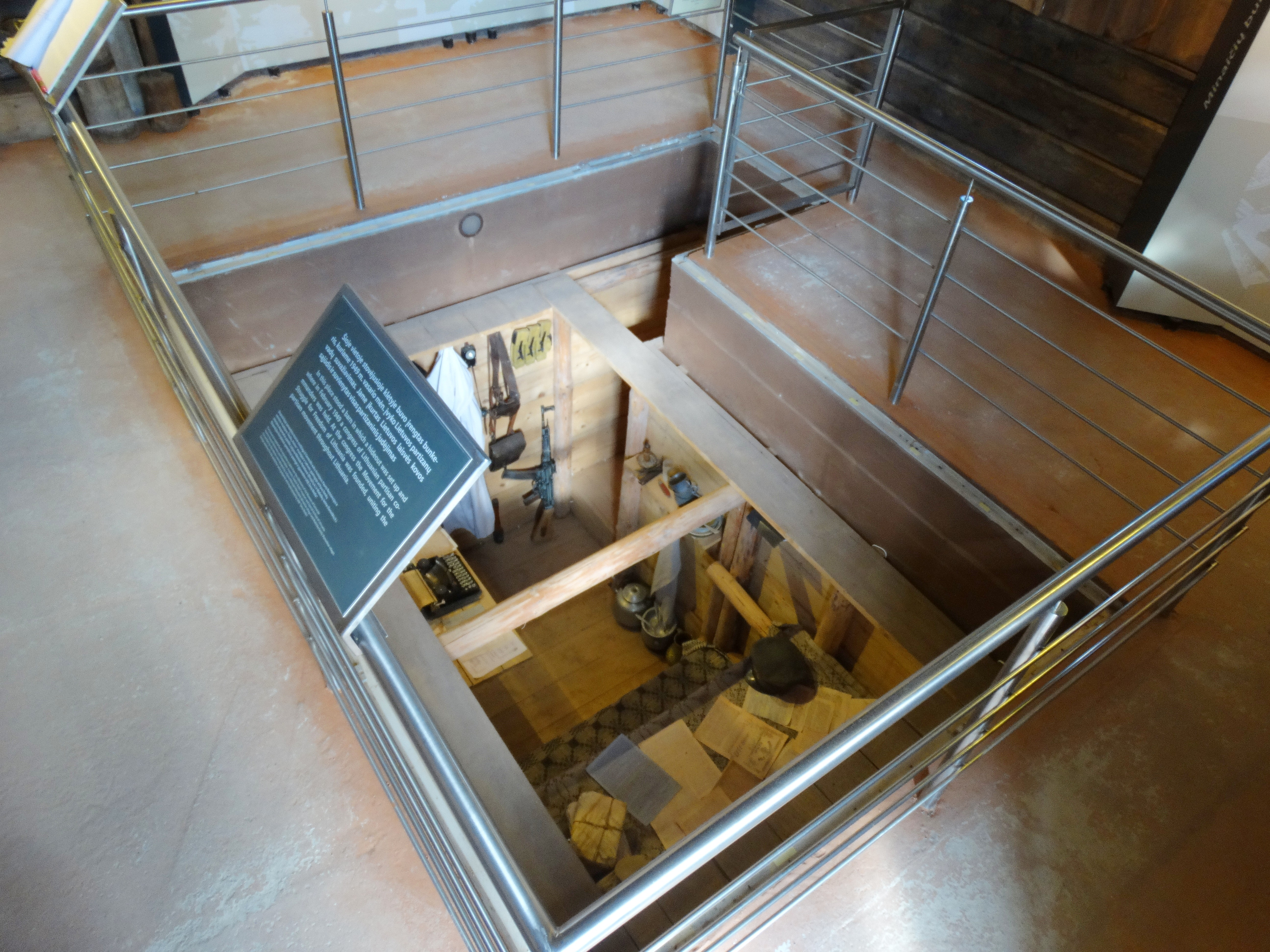
Restored partisan bunker. This bunker was located under a barn and was used in 1949 for adopting the Lithuanian Partisans Declaration (Minaičiai, Radviliškis District Municipality)

The declaration signed in Minaičiai is recognized as a legal act of Lithuania. On January 12, 1999, the Seimas (parliament of Lithuania) passed a decree stating that the Union of Lithuanian Freedom Fighters united military units and social groups, was led by unanimous leadership, engaged in resistance using military means, and fought for the liberation of Lithuania. It was recognized that the Council of the Union, which signed the Declaration of 1944, exercised functions of the highest political and military structure and was the only legitimate authority in the territory of the occupied country.

On the basis of the February 16 Declaration, the Seimas passed a resolution on March 12, 2009 affirming that from February 16, 1949 until his death on May 30, 1953, Jonas Žemaitis-Vytautas was “the head of state of Lithuania fighting against the occupation, who actually performed the duties of the President of the Republic of Lithuania.” On November 20, 2018, Seimas passed a resolution declaring that after the death of Žemaitis-Vytautas, Adolfas Ramanauskas-Vanagas became the President of Lithuania.

On November 22, 2010 a monument by sculptor Jonas Jagėla dedicated to the declaration and its signatories was unveiled in the village of Minaičiai. In 2012, the bunker was restored at the Minaičiai-Pėtrėčiai homestead and the exposition “Atiduok Tėvynei, ką privalai” was installed. In May 2019, the partisan bunker was reproduced at the Center for Civil Education and an exhibition dedicated to the 70th anniversary of the Declaration, “19490216: Apsisprendimo šifras” [19490216: The Code of Self-Determination] was opened.

Every year on February 16, a commemoration in the village of Minaičiai takes place.

On February 14, 2020, one more original copy of the Declaration was found, while recently received documents of Lithuanian freedom fighters were being reviewed at the Lithuanian Special Archives.

== Literature ==
- Auksutė Ramanauskaitė-Skokauskienė. Laisvės deklaracija ir jos signatarai – Kaunas: Naujasis lankas, 2009. – 56 p.: iliustr. – ISBN 978-9955-03-535-0
- Partizanų bunkeryje gimusi deklaracija // Kauno diena, 2009-02-07
