= Povilas Lukšys (soldier) =

Lithuanian soldier

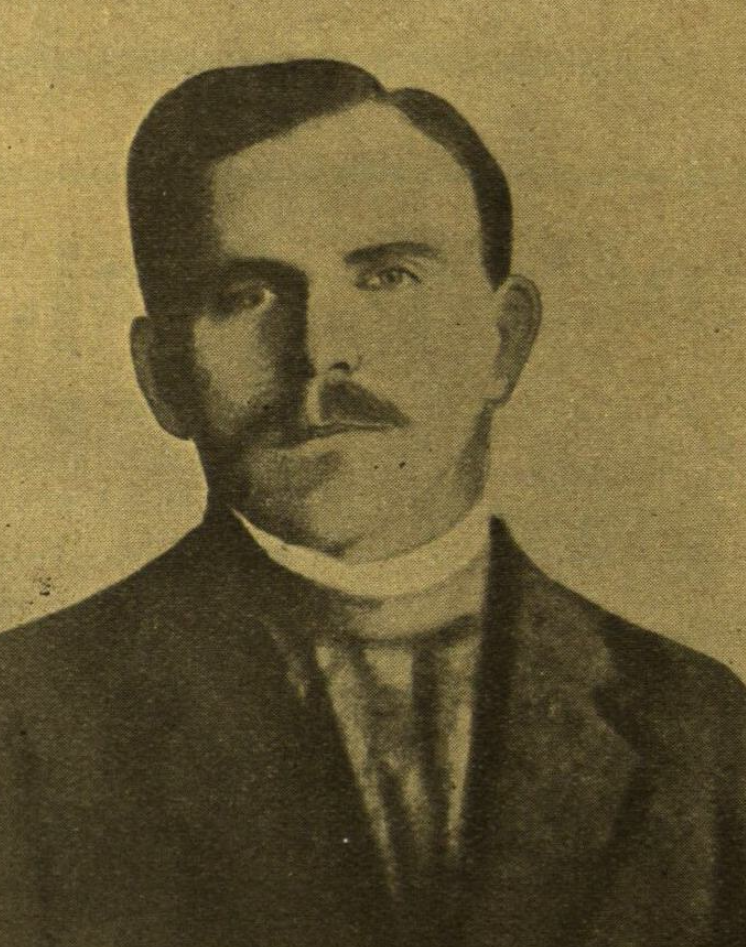
- Portrait of Lukšys in the magazine Kardas
- Born: 21 June 1886; Kazokai, Russian Empire
- Died: 8 January 1919 (aged 32); Taučiūnai, Lithuania
- Military career
- Allegiance: Imperial Russian Army; Lithuanian Army
- Awards: Order of the Cross of Vytis

Povilas Lukšys (21 August 1886 – 8 February 1919) was the first Lithuanian Army soldier who died for the independence of Lithuania in the Lithuanian Wars of Independence.

== Biography ==
Lukšys was born in Kazokai in the present-day Panevėžys District Municipality. During World War I, Lukšys served in the Imperial Russian Army. When the Lithuanian army began to be recreated as Lithuania regained its independence, Lukšys organized a group of volunteers. He was an officer of the Kėdainiai defence squad, the commander of the field guard as well as the deputy head of the reconnaissance squad. In the Kėdainiai county, Lukšys was involved in battles against Soviet Russian units that were attacking in the direction of Kaunas.

Lukšys died on 8 February 1919 while carrying out a reconnaissance mission near the village of Taučiūnai, where a fierce shootout took place. Lukšys was buried in the Kėdainiai cemetery. Later, other volunteers who died for Lithuanian independence were also buried there.

== Commemoration ==
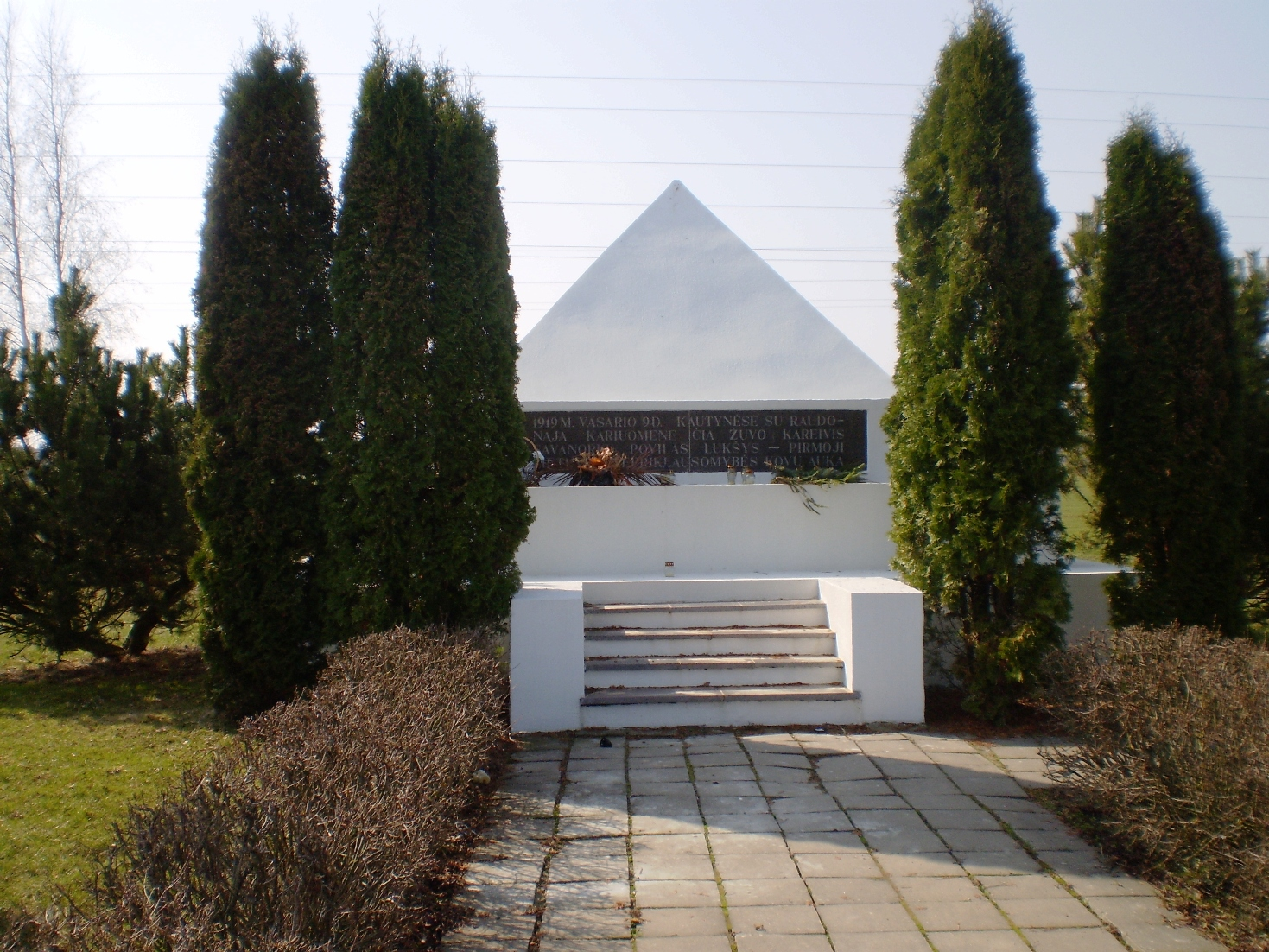
Monument to Povilas Lukšys in Taučiūnai

At the place of Lukšys' death, a monument was built in 1929 according to the plans of the architect Vytautas Landsbergis-Žemkalnis. The one-hectare plot of land where the monument is built was donated by Marijonas Vendziagolskis, the owner of Taučiūnai Manor (who bought it from a farmer and later donated it "for public use").

The monument consisted of three 9-metre (30 ft) long concrete terraces and a three-walled pyramid built on them. The monument reached 2.5 metres (8 ft 2 in) in height. Its shape symbolized the triangular sign of the volunteers and the three terraces represented the three colors of the national flag of Lithuania. The granite pyramid itself represented eternity. A staircase was installed in the middle of the lower terrace, and the Vytis cross with oak branches and the inscription was carved on the front plane of the pyramid: "On 9 February 1919 volunteer soldier Povilas Lukšys died here in battles with the Russian Red Army – the first victim of Lithuania's Independence".

The monument stood in Taučiūnai until 1962, when it was demolished by order of the Kėdainiai Communist Party Committee. The plot was plowed and planted with beets. In 1989, in commemoration of the 70th anniversary of Povilas Lukšys' death, a wooden cross was erected in this place. On 16 February 1993, the monument was rebuilt. The monument was also consecrated.

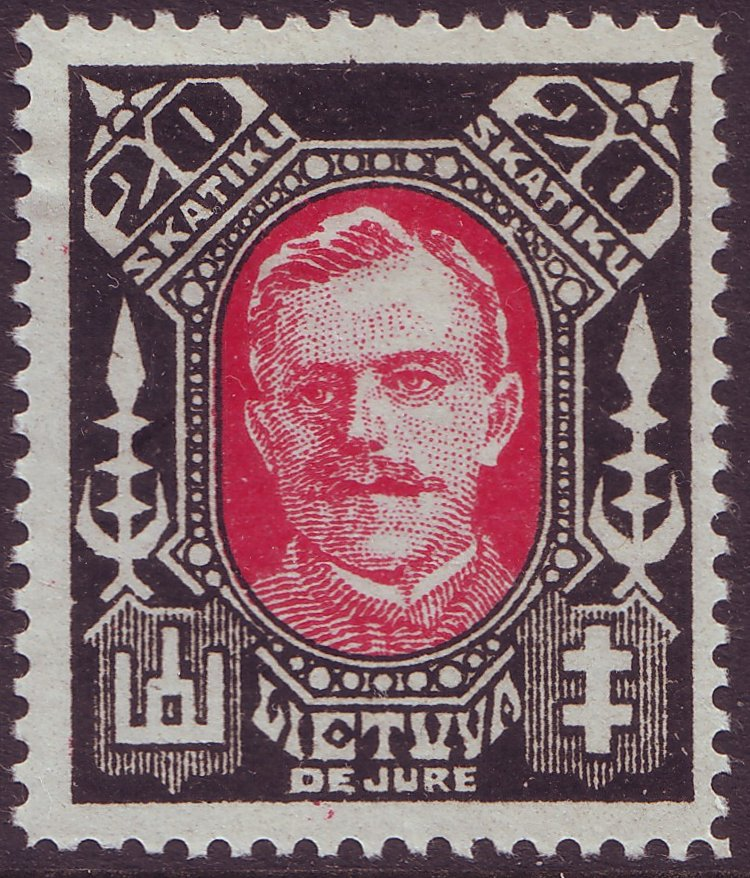
Povilas Lukšys on a stamp celebrating the jure recognition of Lithuania by other countries in 1922

A monument to Lukšys was also built in the garden of the Vytautas the Great War Museum in Kaunas.

== Awards ==
- Order of the Cross of Vytis, First Class (1923, awarded posthumously).

== Bibliography ==
- Mockienė, Jurgita (24 January 2023) [2018]. "Povilas Lukšys". Visuotinė lietuvių enciklopedija (in Lithuanian). Mokslo ir enciklopedijų leidybos centras.
- Staliūnas, Darius (2001). "Žuvusiųjų karių kultas tarpukario Lietuvoje" (PDF). Lietuvių Atgimimo istorijos studijos (in Lithuanian). 17. ISSN 1392-0391.
