= Raseiniai District Municipality =

Coordinates: 55°23′49″N 23°09′40″E

Raseiniai District Municipality Raseinių rajono savivaldybė
- Municipality
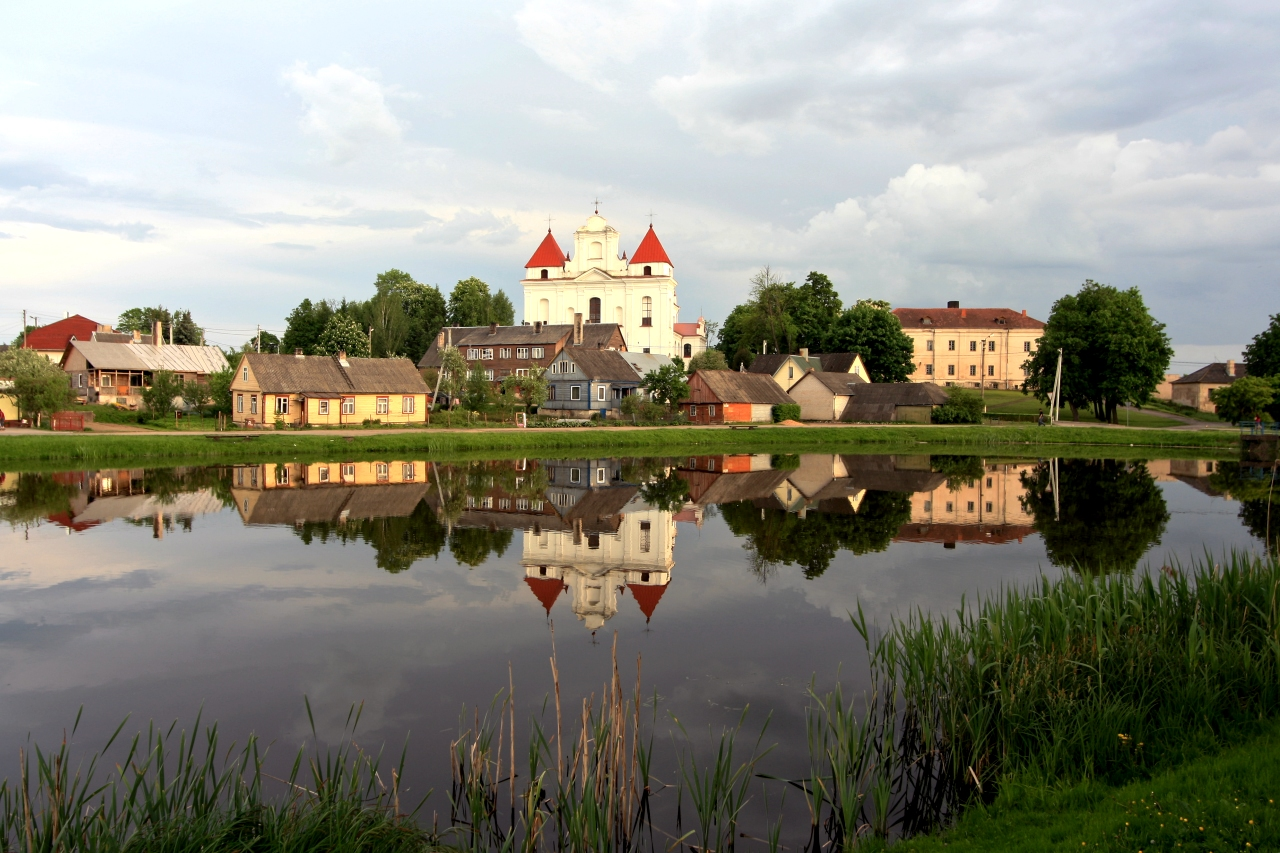
- Pond near Raseiniai

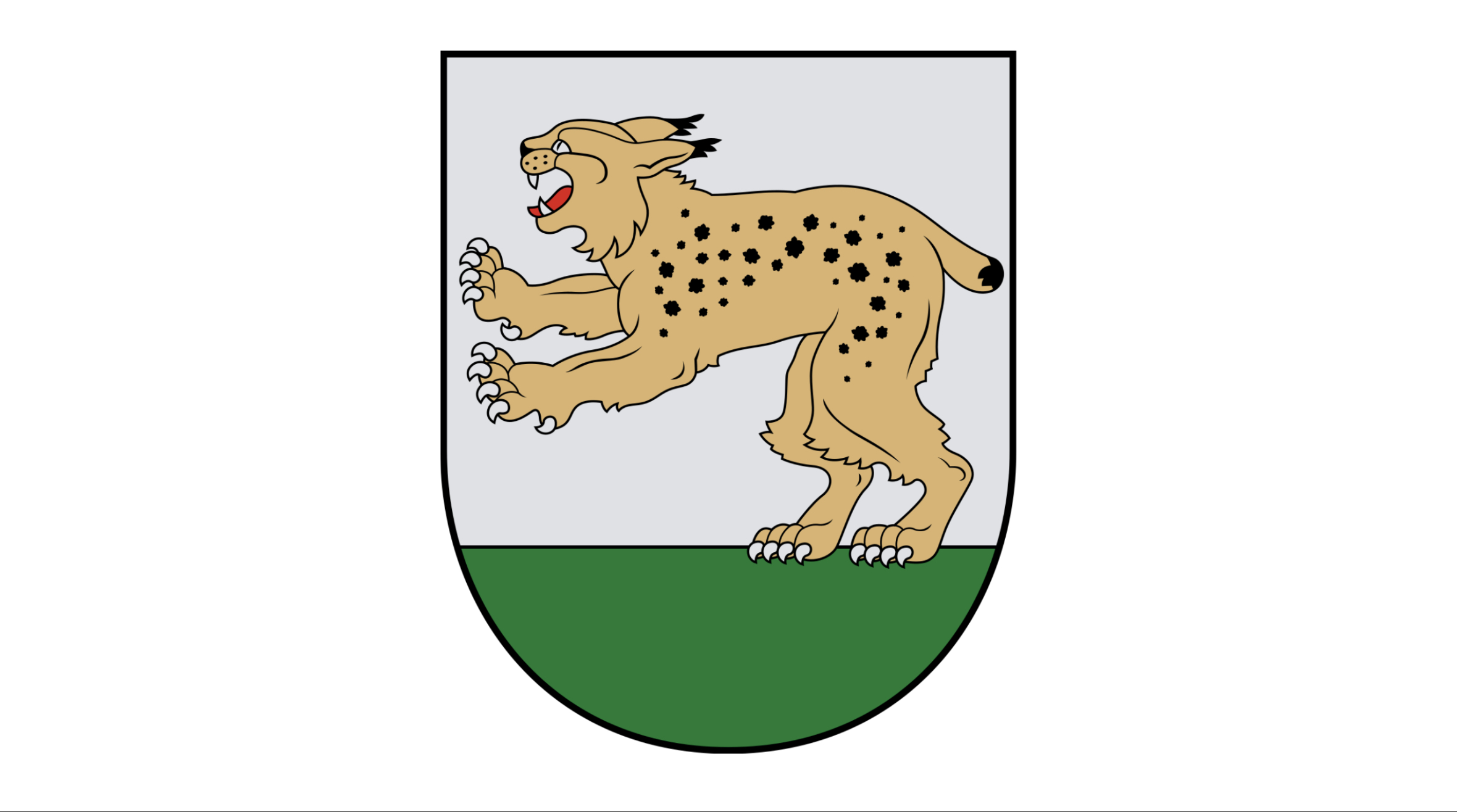
- Flag Coat of arms Brandmark

- Location of Raseiniai district municipality within Lithuania

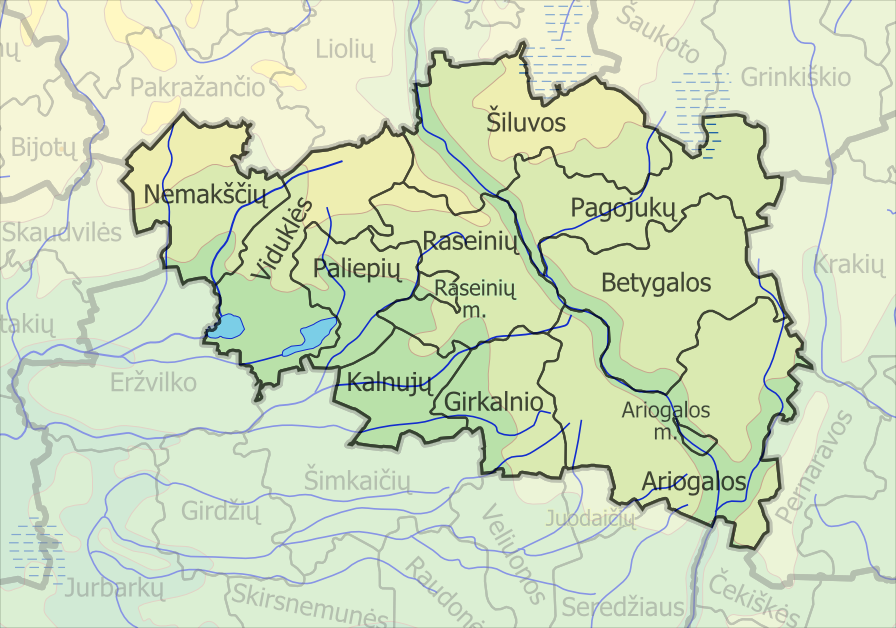
- Map of Raseiniai district municipality
- Country: Lithuania
- Ethnographic region: Samogitia
- County: Kaunas County
- Capital: Raseiniai
- Elderships: 12

Area
  - Total: 1,573 km^{2} (607 sq mi)
  - Rank: 12th

Population (2021)
  - Total: 31,192
  - Rank: 23-24th
  - Density: 19.83/km^{2} (51.36/sq mi)
  - Rank: 34-35th
- Time zone: UTC+2 (EET)
  - Summer (DST): UTC+3 (EEST)
- Telephone code: 428
- Major settlements: Raseiniai (pop. 9,686); Ariogala (pop. 2,674); Viduklė (pop. 1,425)
- Website: www.raseiniai.lt

Raseiniai District Municipality is one of 60 municipalities in Lithuania.

== Symbols ==
Coat of arms: A traditional Iberic shield Argent, resting on a base Vert a lynx salient Proper.

== Partners ==
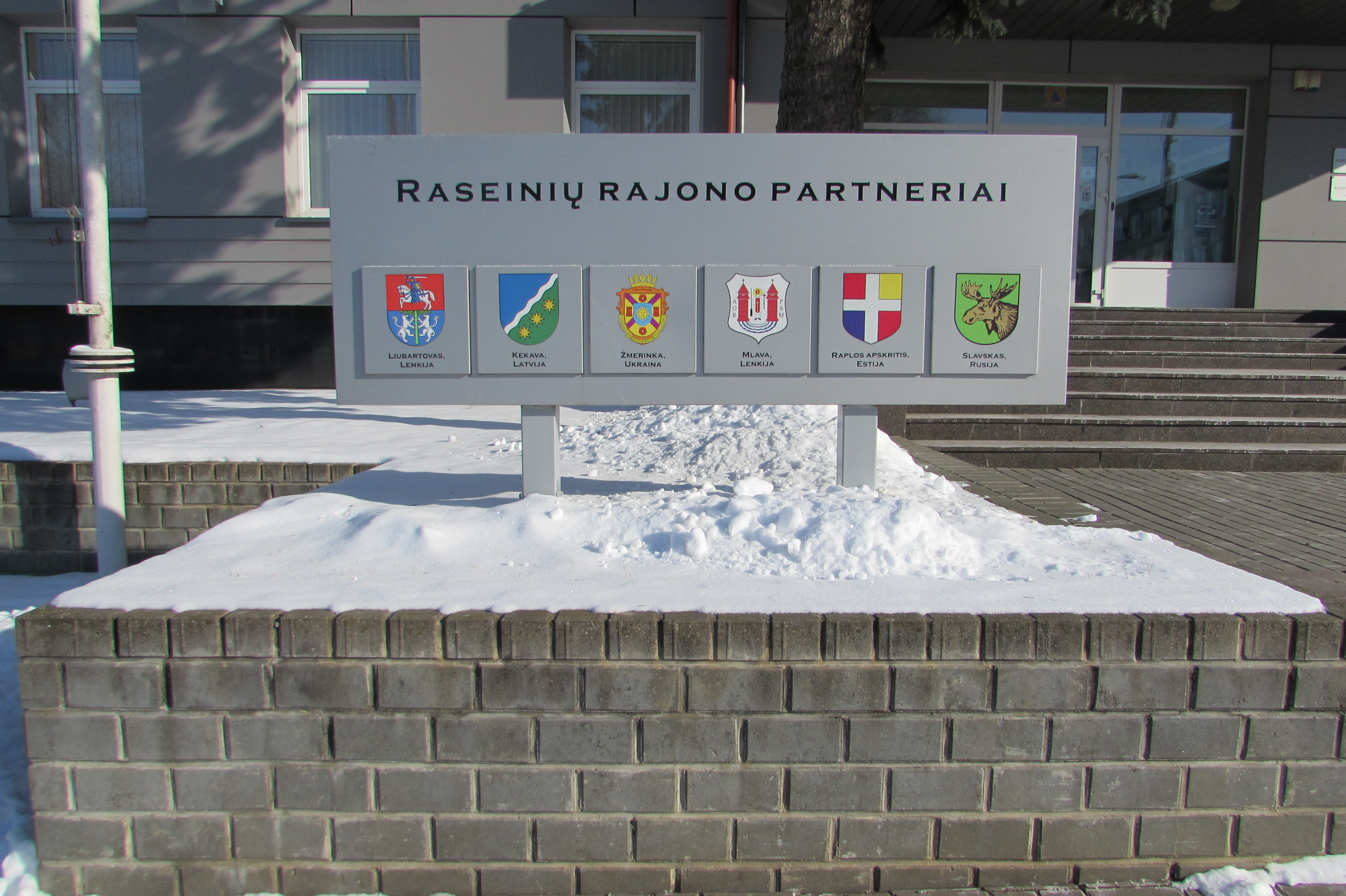
Raseiniai partner towns

Raseiniai is twinned with:

- Ķekava, Latvia
- Lubartów, Poland
- Mława, Poland
- Jászberény, Hungary
- Rapla County, Estonia
- Unstrut-Hainich-Kreis, Germany
- Zhmerynka, Ukraine
