= Lažai =

- Village
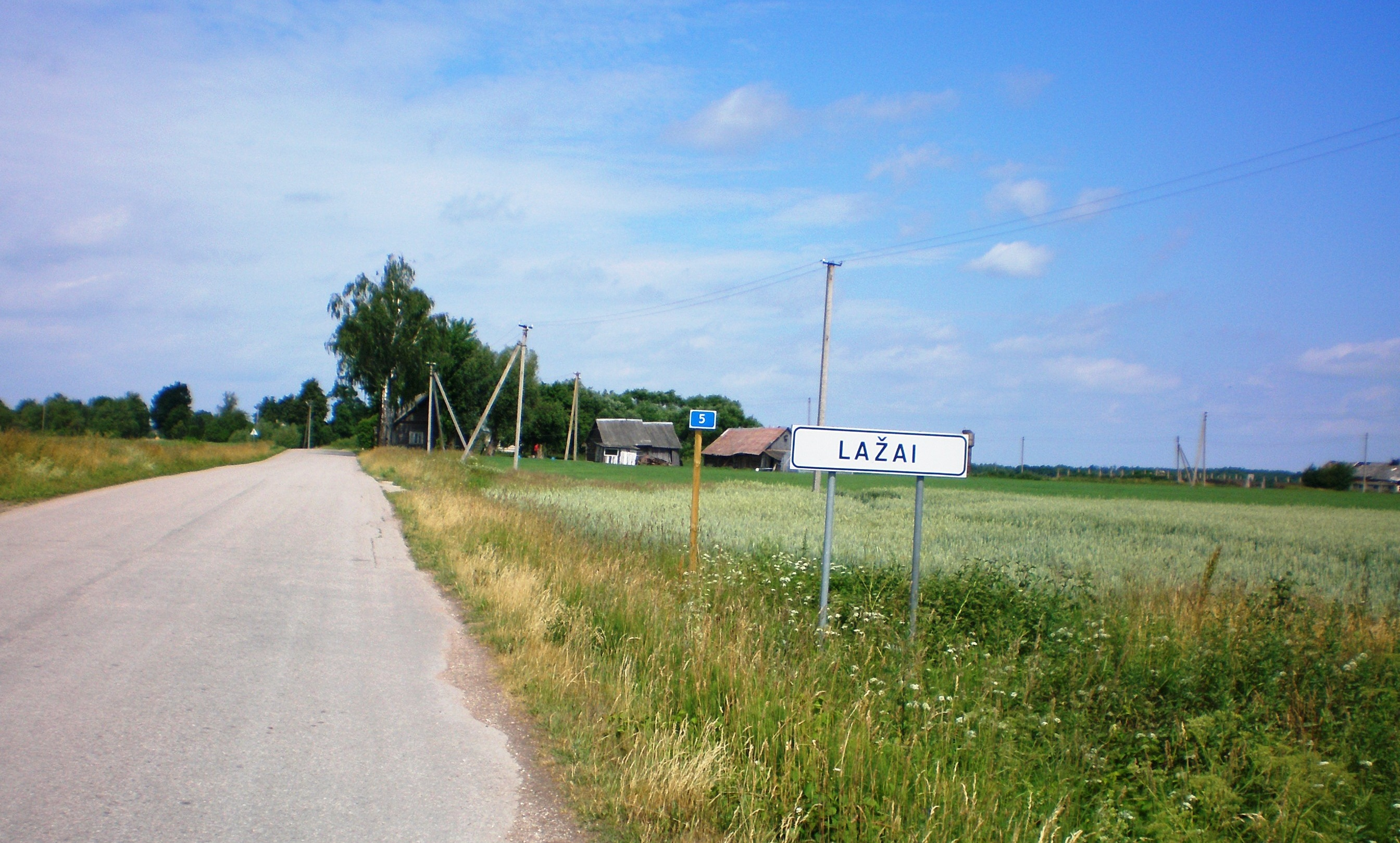

- Location in Lithuania Lažai (Lithuania)
- Coordinates: 55°28′52″N 23°58′19″E
- Country: Lithuania
- County: Kaunas County
- Municipality: Kėdainiai district municipality
- Eldership: Surviliškis Eldership

Population (2011)
  - Total: 58
- Time zone: UTC+2 (EET)
  - Summer (DST): UTC+3 (EEST)

Lažai ('corvées', formerly Polish: Łoże, Russian: Ложи, Ложе) is a village in Kėdainiai district municipality, in Kaunas County, in central Lithuania. According to the 2011 census, the village had a population of 58 people. It is located 5 km from Surviliškis, by the river Liaudė, nearby Sosiai forest. There is a former school.

== Demography ==
Historical population

Year	Pop.	±% p.a.
1902	238	—
1923	213	−0.53%
1959	171	−0.61%
1970	132	−2.33%

Year	Pop.	±% p.a.
1979	144	+0.97%
1989	98	−3.78%
2001	80	−1.68%
2011	58	−3.16%

Source: 1902, 1923, 1959 & 1970, 1979, 1989, 2001, 2011

== Images ==
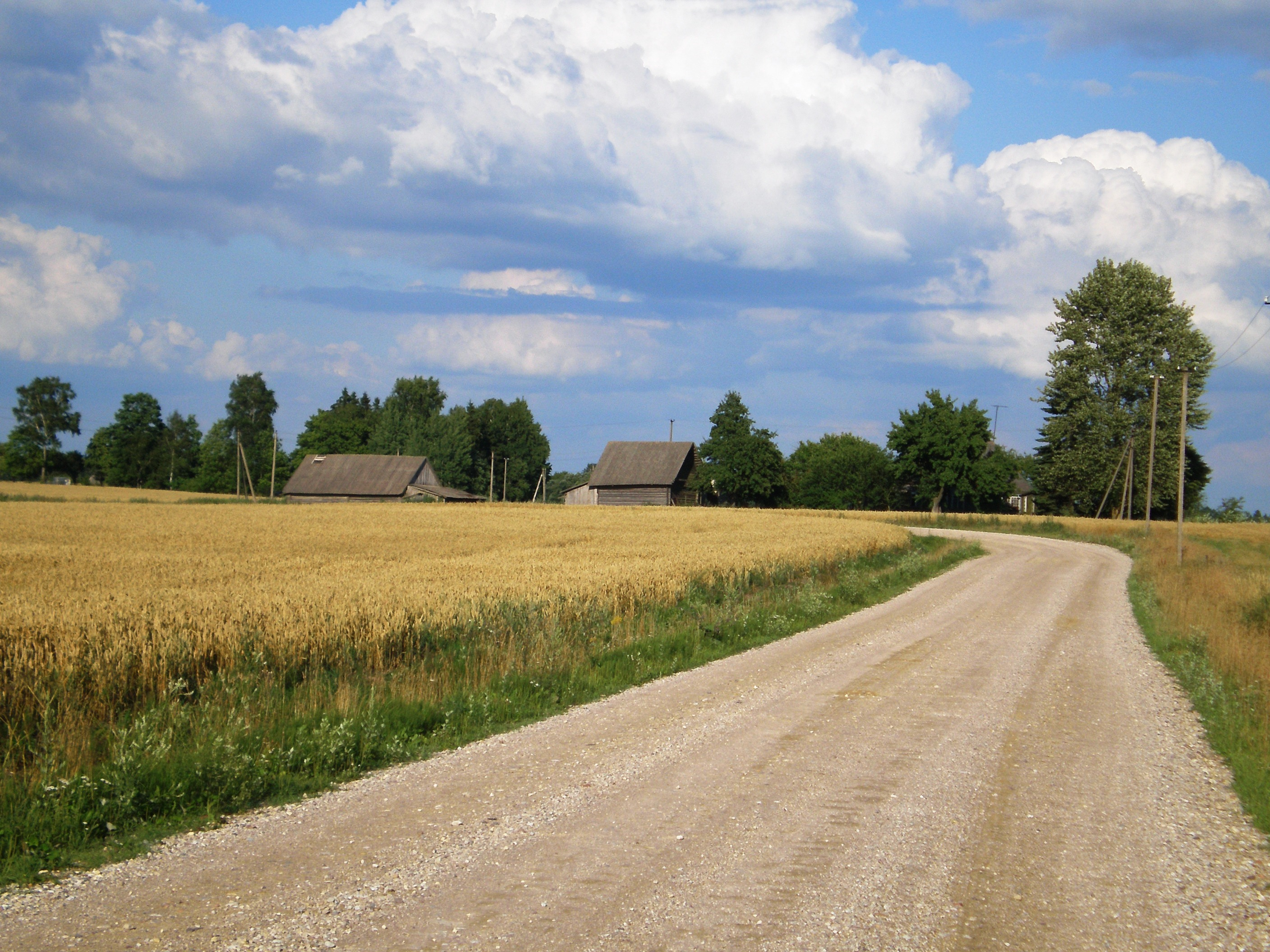
A homestead by the road to Užupė

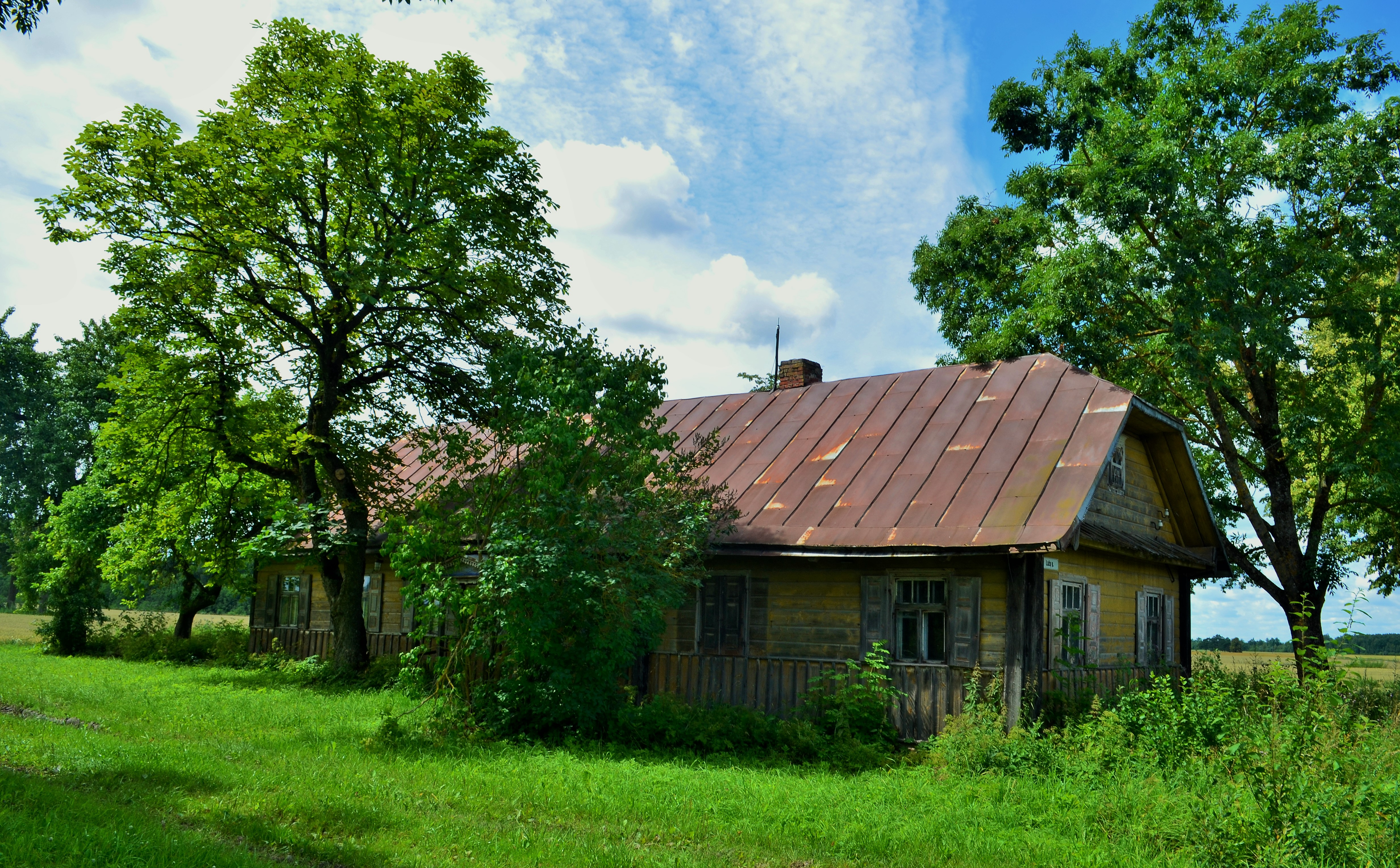
An old Aukštaitian gryčia in Lažai

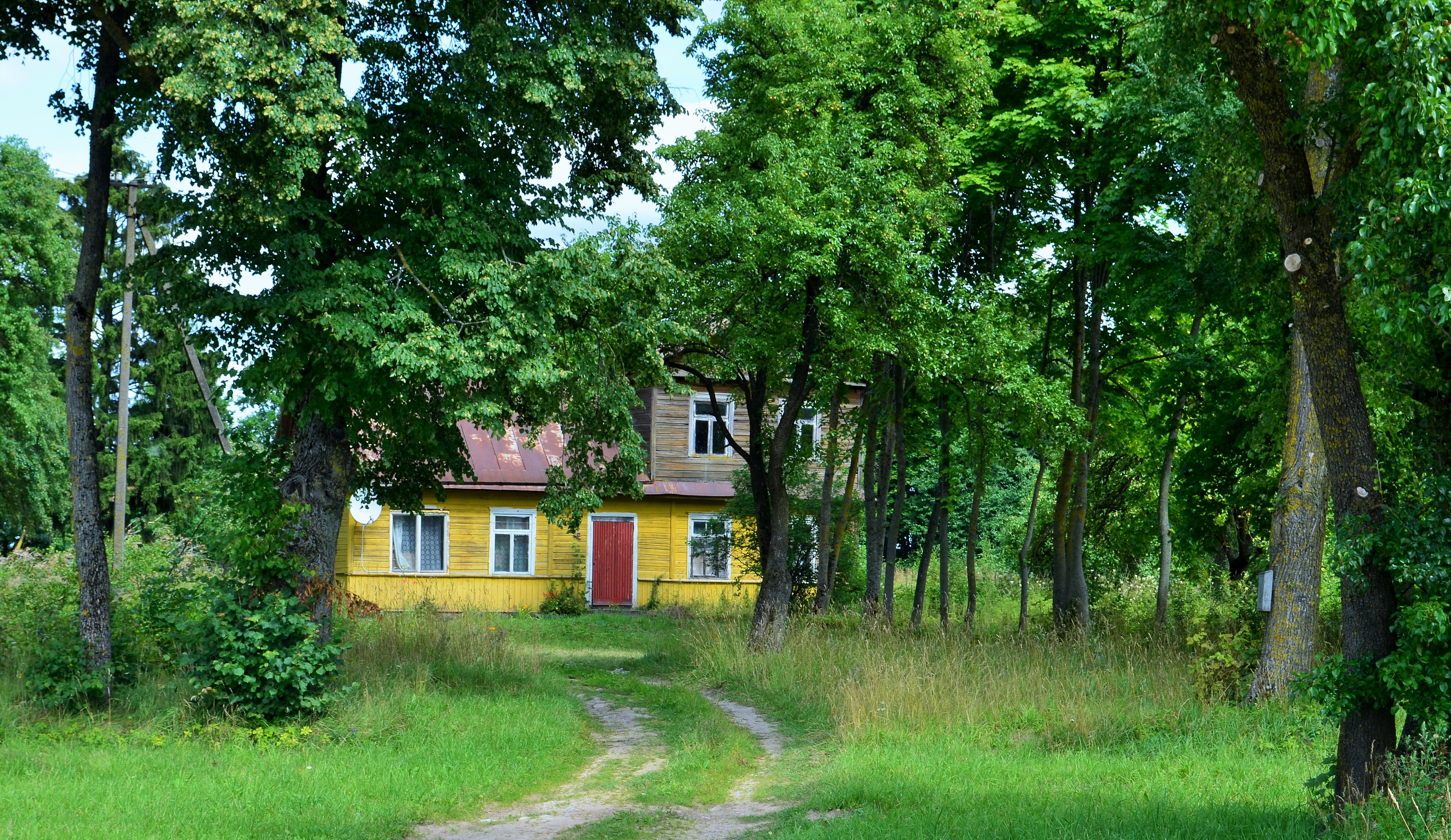
A former school
