= Bališkiai, Kėdainiai =

Bališkiai
- Village
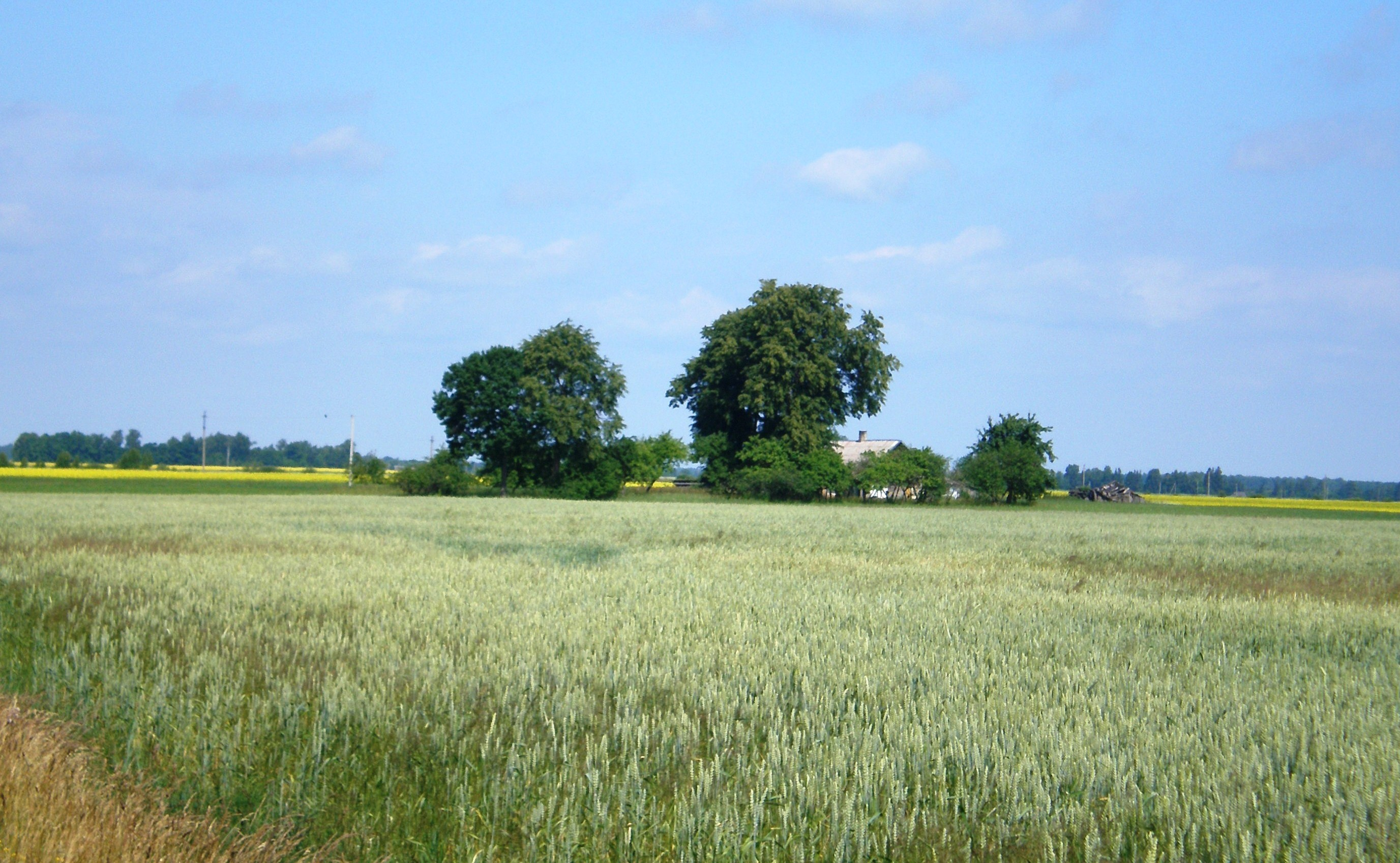

- Location in Lithuania
- Coordinates: 55°27′29″N 24°00′29″E
- Country: Lithuania
- County: Kaunas County
- Municipality: Kėdainiai district municipality
- Eldership: Surviliškis Eldership

Population (2011)
  - Total: 0
- Time zone: UTC+2 (EET)
  - Summer (DST): UTC+3 (EEST)

Bališkiai (formerly Russian: Балишки) is a village in Kėdainiai district municipality, in Kaunas County, in central Lithuania. According to the 2011 census, the village was uninhabited. It is located 2 km from Surviliškis, nearby the Liaudė river.

== Demography ==
Historical population

Year	Pop.	±% p.a.
1902	59	—
1923	59	+0.00%
1959	22	−2.70%
1970	11	−6.11%

Year	Pop.	±% p.a.
1979	4	−10.63%
1989	3	−2.84%
2001	2	−3.32%
2011	0	−100.00%

Source: 1902, 1923, 1959 & 1970, 1979, 1989, 2001, 2011
