= Bakainiai =

- Village
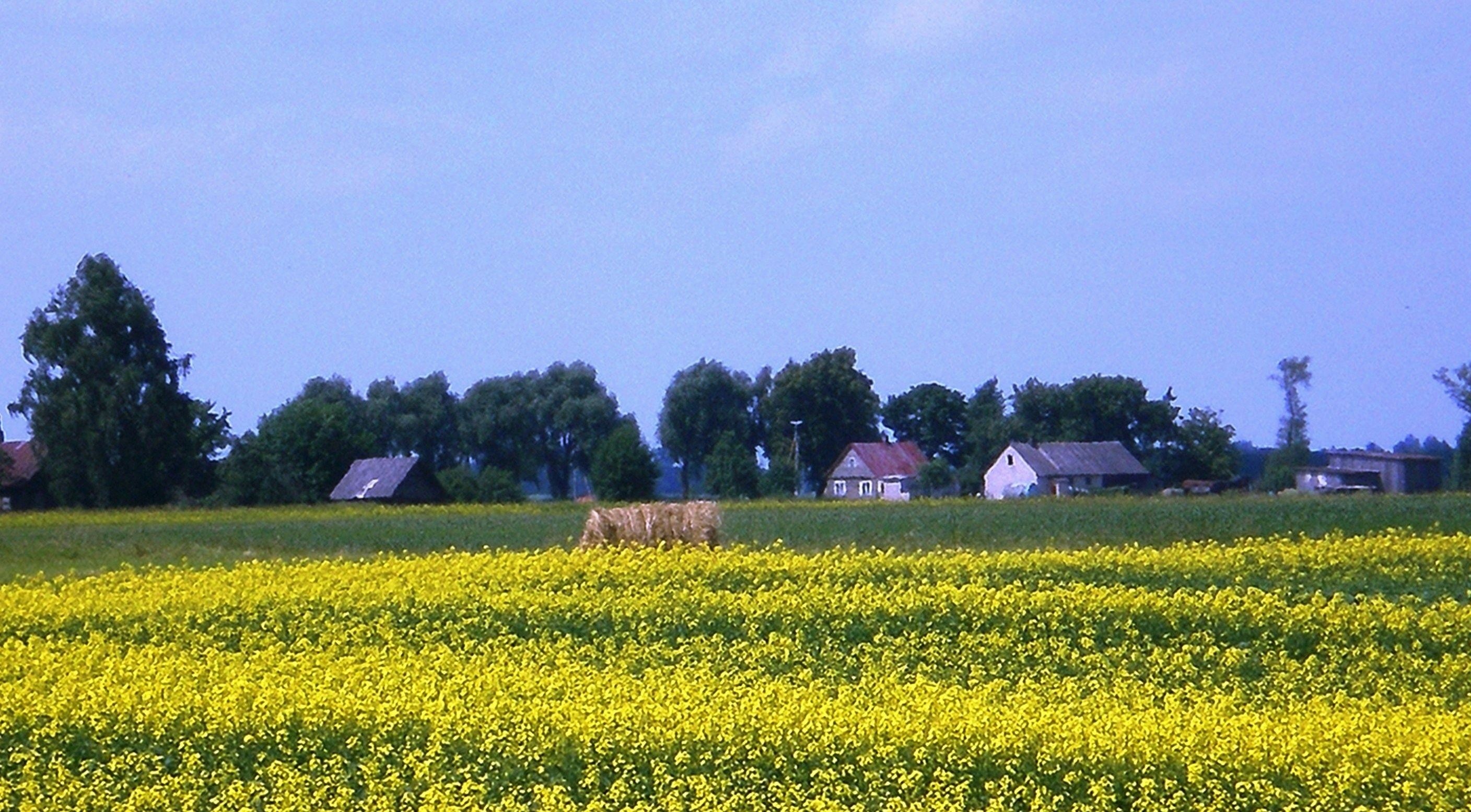

- Location in Lithuania Bakainiai (Lithuania)
- Coordinates: 55°27′22″N 24°01′30″E
- Country: Lithuania
- County: Kaunas County
- Municipality: Kėdainiai district municipality
- Eldership: Surviliškis Eldership

Population (2011)
  - Total: 62
- Time zone: UTC+2 (EET)
  - Summer (DST): UTC+3 (EEST)

Bakainiai (formerly Polish: Bakajnie, Russian: Бакайни) is a village in Kėdainiai district municipality, in Kaunas County, in central Lithuania. According to the 2011 census, the village had a population of 62 people. It is located 1 km from Surviliškis, by the Liaudė river. There is hillfort in Bakainiai, on the bank of the Liaudė.

== History ==
Bakainiai castle was mentioned in 1731, by Teutonic Order. At the 18th century there was a well fortified Swedish war camp on the hillfort.

== Demography ==
Historical population

Year	Pop.	±% p.a.
1902	77	—
1923	210	+4.89%
1959	214	+0.05%
1970	151	−3.12%
1979	142	−0.68%

Year	Pop.	±% p.a.
1984	128	−2.05%
1989	81	−8.75%
2001	94	+1.25%
2011	62	−4.08%

Source: 1902, 1923, 1959 & 1970, 1979, 1989, 2001, 2011

== Images ==
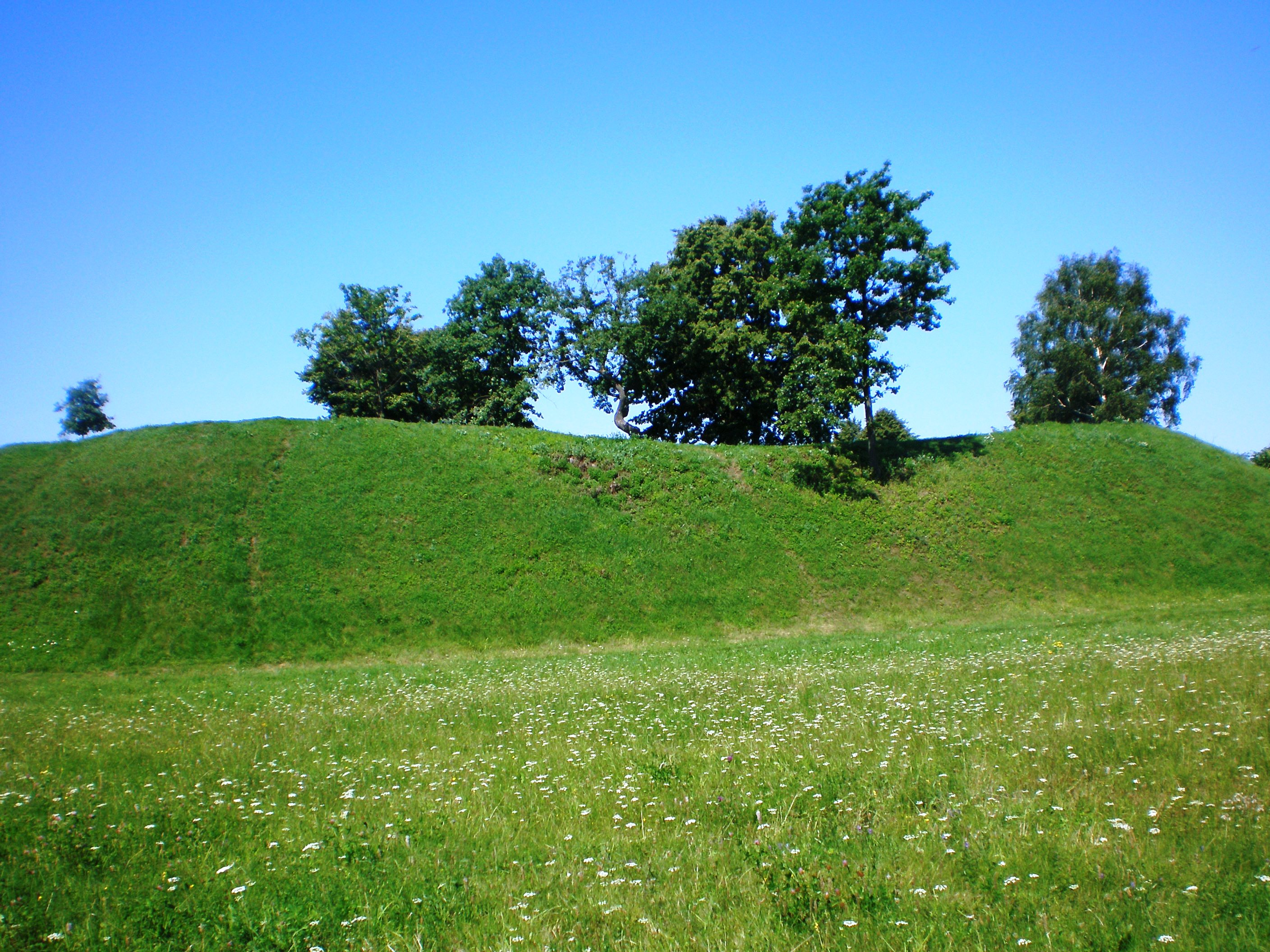
Bakainiai hillfort

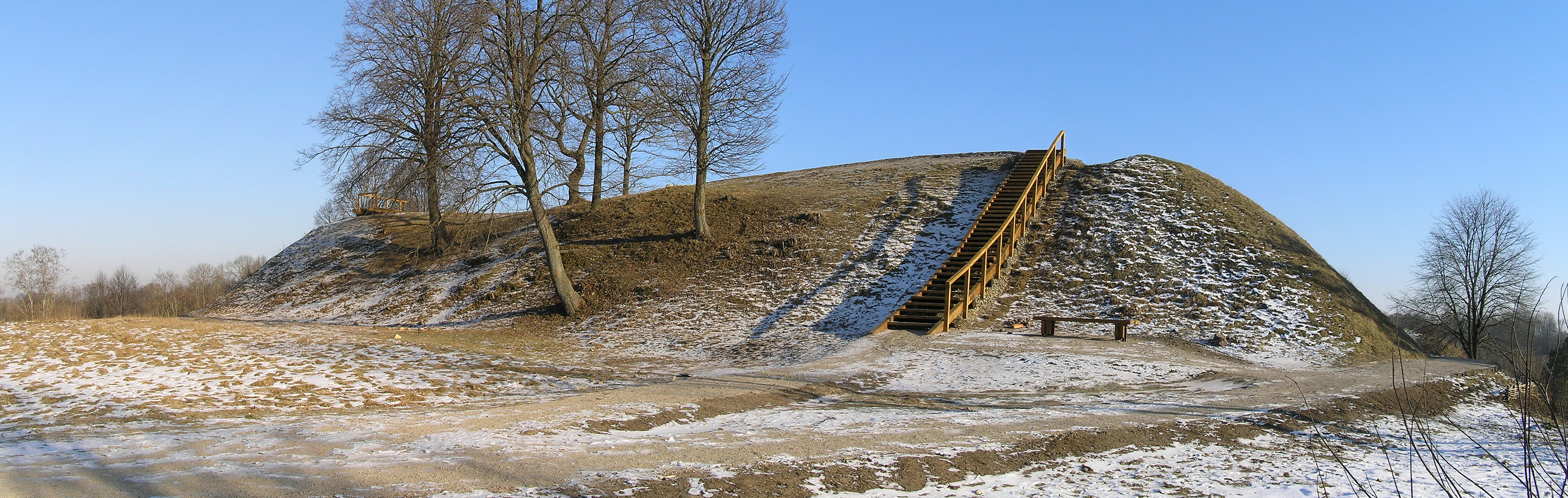
Bakainiai hillfort

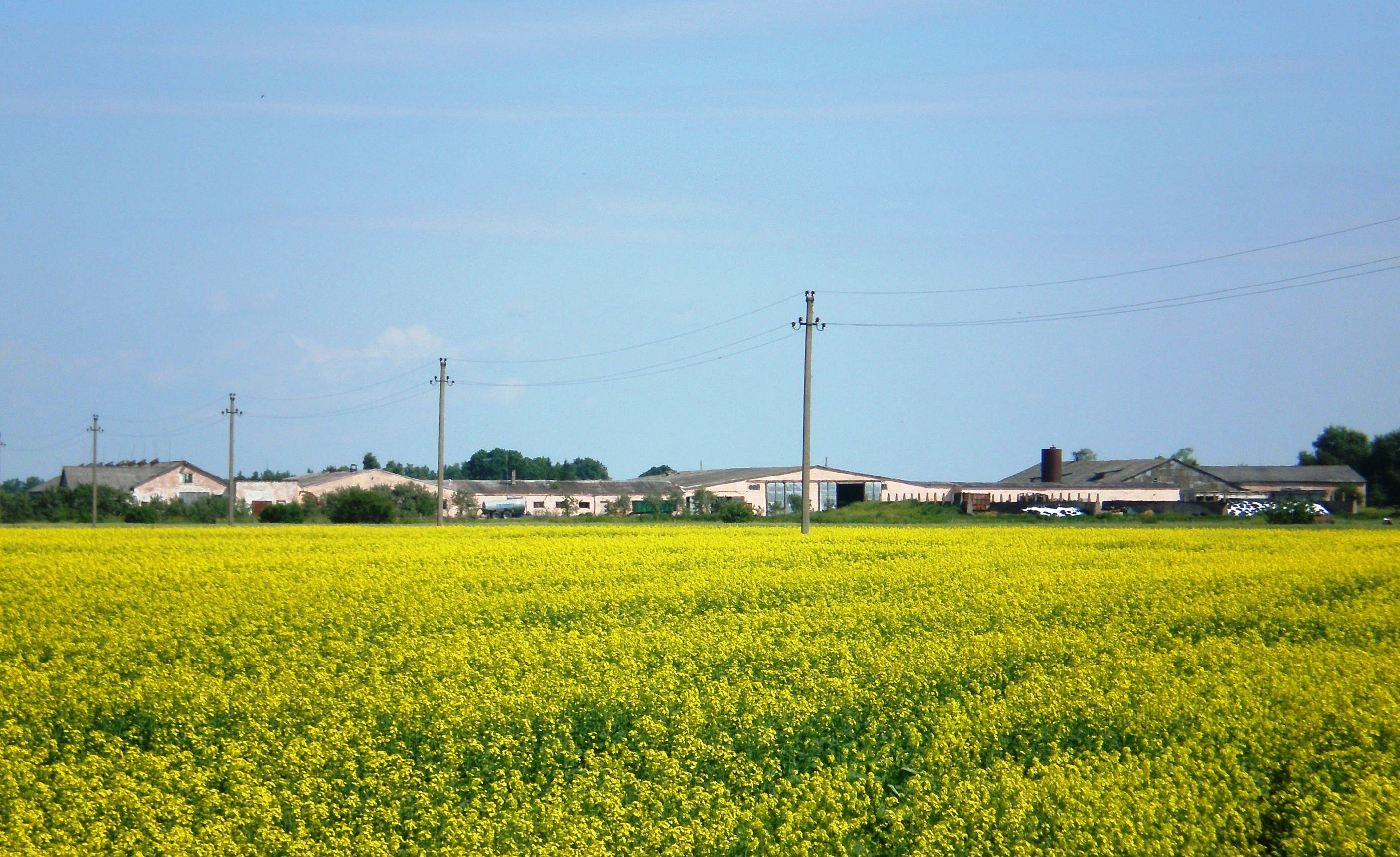
Bakainiai farms
