= Spigučiai =

- Village
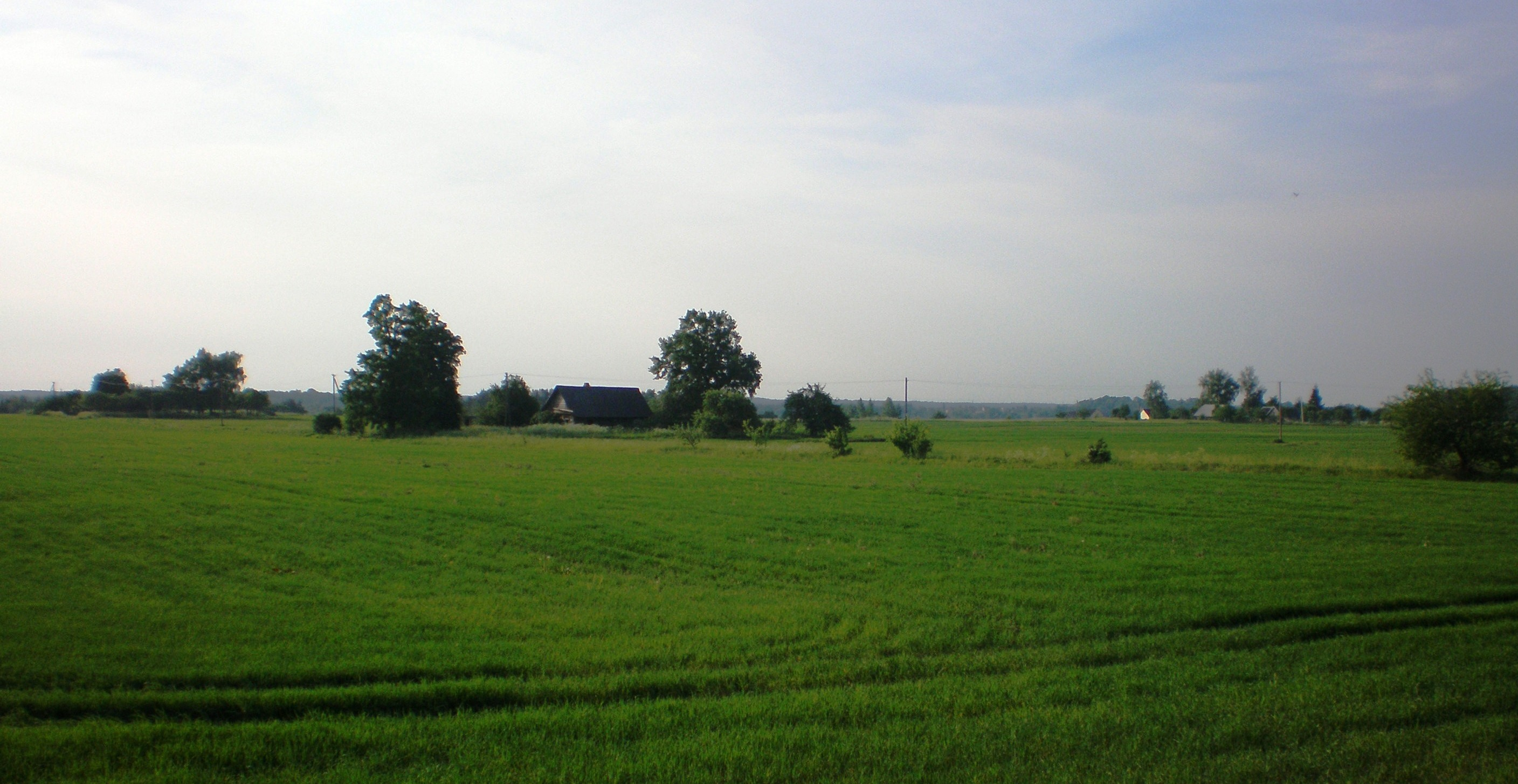

- Location in Lithuania
- Coordinates: 55°25′59″N 24°01′59″E
- Country: Lithuania
- County: Kaunas County
- Municipality: Kėdainiai district municipality
- Eldership: Surviliškis Eldership

Population (2011)
  - Total: 1
- Time zone: UTC+2 (EET)
  - Summer (DST): UTC+3 (EEST)

Spigučiai (formerly Russian: Спигуце) is a village in Kėdainiai district municipality, in Kaunas County, in central Lithuania. According to the 2011 census, the village has a population of 1 person. It is located 2 km from Surviliškis, by the regional road Kėdainiai-Krekenava-Panevėžys.

== Demography ==
Historical population

Year	Pop.	±% p.a.
1902	46	—
1923	34	−1.43%
1959	13	−2.64%
1970	13	+0.00%

Year	Pop.	±% p.a.
1979	8	−5.25%
1989	6	−2.84%
2001	8	+2.43%
2011	1	−18.77%

Source: 1902, 1923, 1959 & 1970, 1979, 1989, 2001, 2011
