= Surviliškis (village) =

- Village
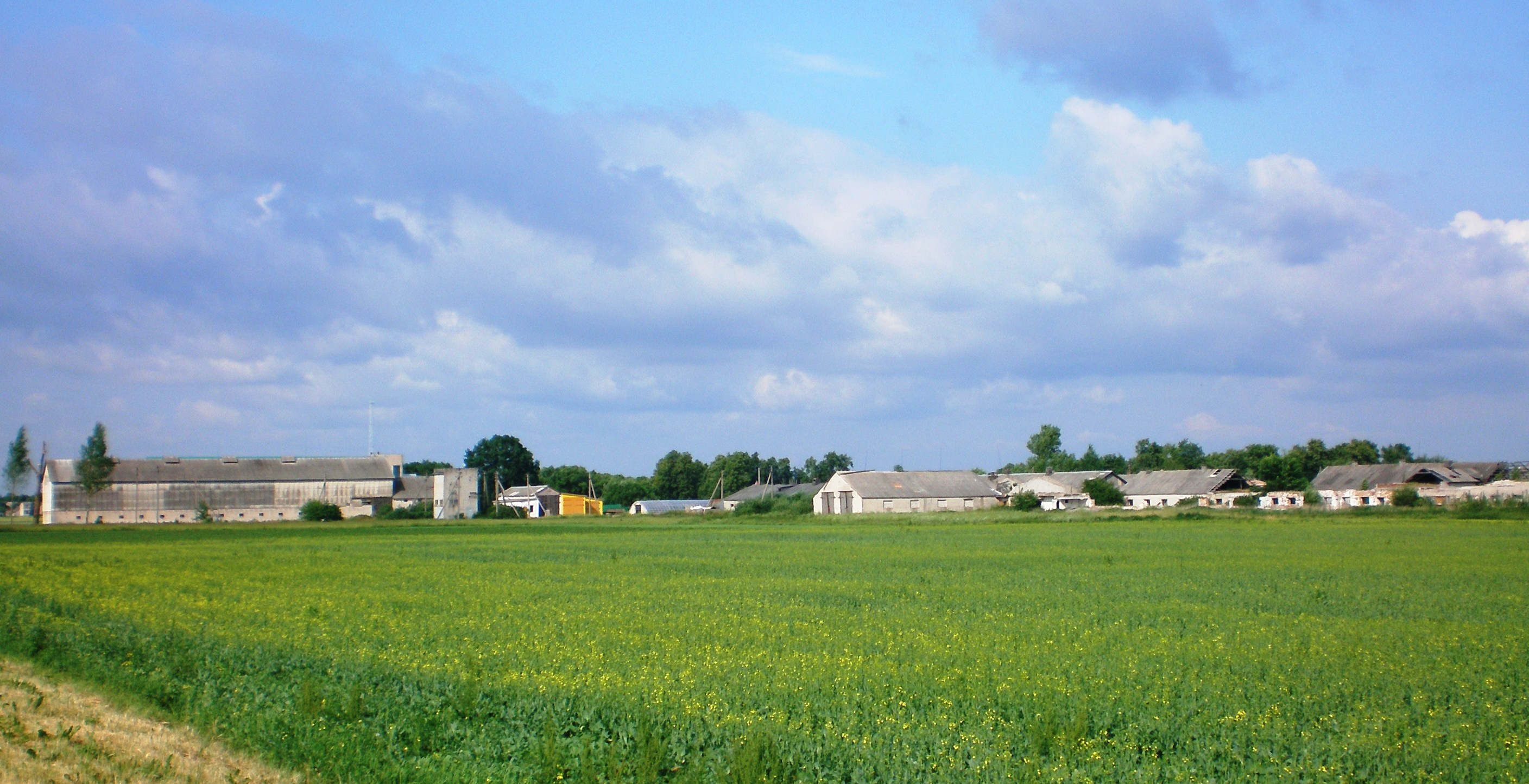

- Location in Lithuania
- Coordinates: 55°26′10″N 24°01′48″E
- Country: Lithuania
- County: Kaunas County
- Municipality: Kėdainiai district municipality
- Eldership: Surviliškis Eldership

Population (2011)
  - Total: 8
- Time zone: UTC+2 (EET)
  - Summer (DST): UTC+3 (EEST)

Surviliškis is a village in Kėdainiai district municipality, in Kaunas County, in central Lithuania. According to the 2021 census, the village has a population of about 300 people. It is located next to the southern edge of Surviliškis town, by the regional road Kėdainiai-Krekenava-Panevėžys, on the right bank of the Nevėžis river. There is a farm cooperative.

== Demography ==
Historical population

Year	Pop.	±% p.a.
1902	44	—
1923	26	−2.47%
1959	65	+2.58%
1970	40	−4.32%

Year	Pop.	±% p.a.
1979	15	−10.33%
1989	12	−2.21%
2001	14	+1.29%
2011	8	−5.44%

Source: 1902, 1923, 1959 & 1970, 1979, 1989, 2001, 2011
