= Surviliškis Eldership =

Surviliškis Eldership Surviliškio seniūnija
- Eldership
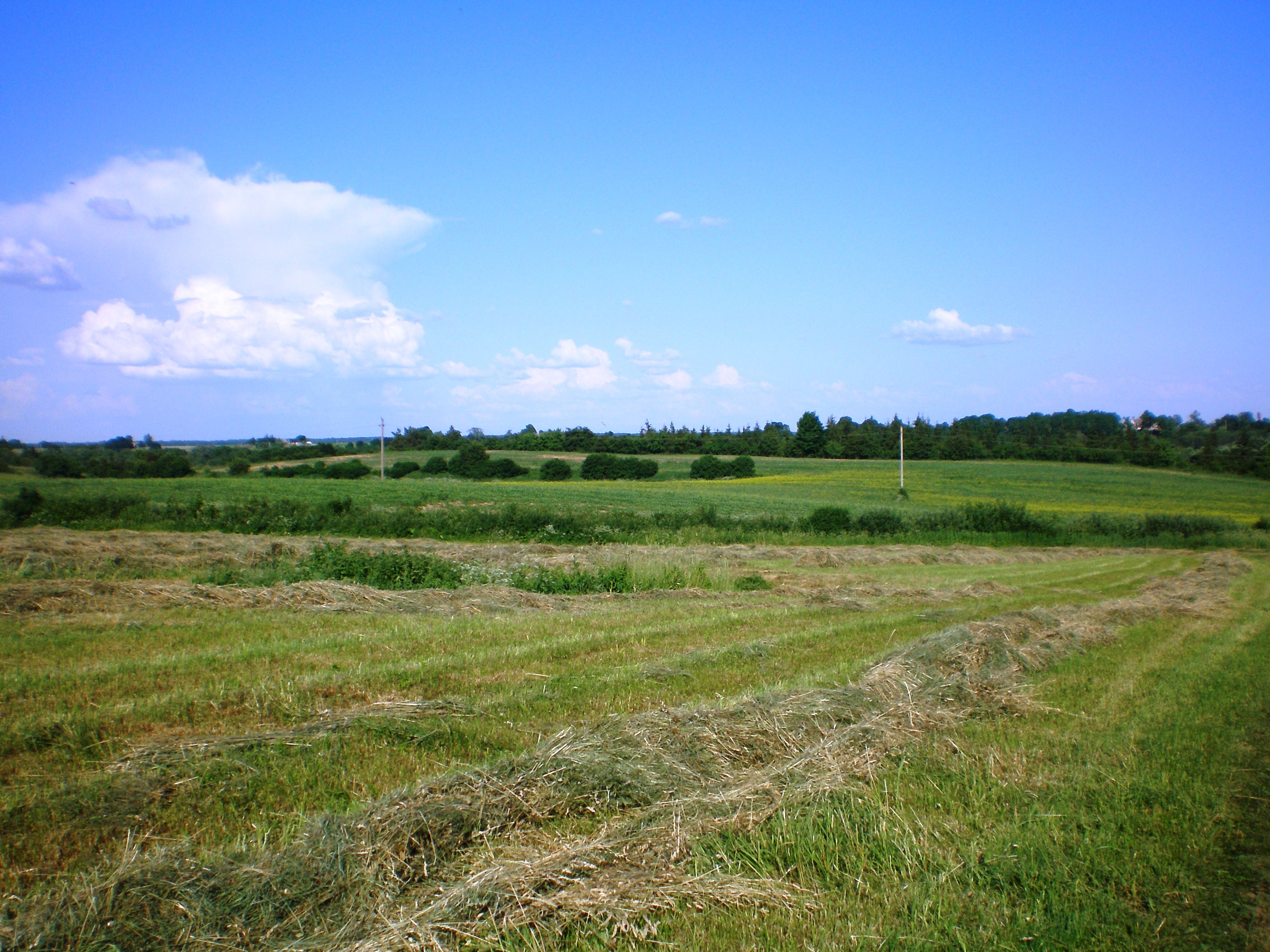
- Landscape near Lomeikiškiai

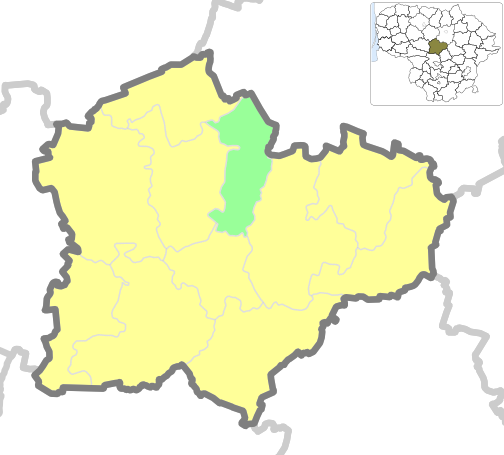
- Location of Surviliškis eldership
- Country: Lithuania
- Ethnographic region: Aukštaitija
- County: Kaunas County
- Municipality: Kėdainiai District Municipality
- Administrative centre: Surviliškis

Area
  - Total: 83 km^{2} (32 sq mi)

Population (2011)
  - Total: 1,545
  - Density: 19/km^{2} (48/sq mi)
- Time zone: UTC+2 (EET)
  - Summer (DST): UTC+3 (EEST)

Surviliškis Eldership (Lithuanian: Surviliškio seniūnija) is a Lithuanian eldership, located in the northern part of Kėdainiai District Municipality.

Eldership was created from the Surviliškis selsovet in 1993.

== Geography ==
All the territory is in the Central Lithuanian Plain (Nevėžis Plain).

- Rivers: Nevėžis, Liaudė, Kruostas, Skaudinis, Kruostas II;
- Lakes and ponds:
- Forests: Sosiai forest;
- Protected areas: Krekenava Regional Park, Kruostas botanical sanctuary.

== Places of interest ==
- Wooden Catholic church in Surviliškis
- Hillforts of Bakainiai, Lomeikiškiai and Vaidatoniai
- Manors in Kalnaberžė and Sirutiškis
- Old Believers cemetery in Mociūnai
- Wayside St. Mary chapel near Surviliškis
- Wooden chapel in Surviliškis cemetery
- Wooden crosses of famous folk cross maker Vincas Svirskis in Pakruostė and Surviliškis cemetery

== Populated places ==
Following settlements are located in the Surviliškis Eldership (as for 2011 census):

- Towns: Surviliškis
- Villages: Bakainiai · Bališkiai · Berželė · Čireliai · Daškoniai · Dembnė · Gojus · Jogniškiai · Kalnaberžė · Kaukalniai · Kutiškiai · Lažai · Lomeikiškiai · Mociūnai · Močėnai · Pakruostė · Pakruostėlė · Sirutiškis · Spigučiai · Sūriškiai · Surviliškis · Urbeliai · Užupė · Vaidatoniai · Vitėnai · Žirnenka
