= Sūriškiai =

- Village
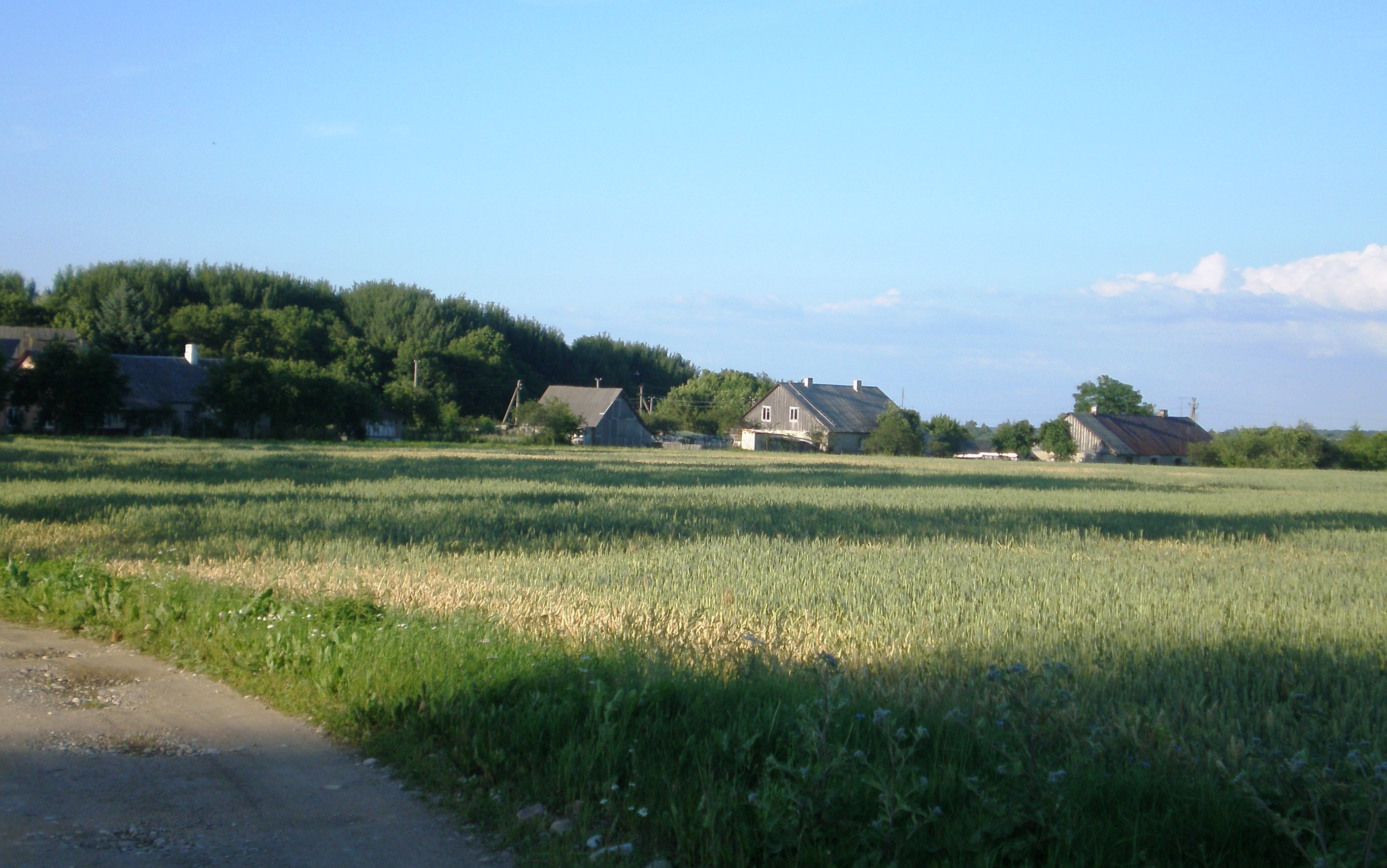

- Location in Lithuania
- Coordinates: 55°25′30″N 24°01′19″E
- Country: Lithuania
- County: Kaunas County
- Municipality: Kėdainiai district municipality
- Eldership: Surviliškis Eldership

Population (2011)
  - Total: 13
- Time zone: UTC+2 (EET)
  - Summer (DST): UTC+3 (EEST)

Sūriškiai (also Soriškiai, Soriškis, formerly Russian: Суришки, Polish: Suryszki) is a village in Kėdainiai district municipality, in Kaunas County, in central Lithuania. According to the 2011 census, the village has a population of 13 people. It is located 3 km from Surviliškis, by the regional road Kėdainiai-Krekenava-Panevėžys, on the right bank of the Nevėžis river. There are some ponds in the former place of sand pit, and some buildings left from the Sūriškiai Manor.

There was the Sūriškiai Manor, where distillery was built in 1859. Later, at the beginning of the 20th century, Sūriškiai was a folwark of the Sirutiškis Manor.

== Demography ==
Historical population

Year	Pop.	±% p.a.
1902	74	—
1923	107	+1.77%
1959	91	−0.45%
1970	51	−5.13%

Year	Pop.	±% p.a.
1979	33	−4.72%
1989	19	−5.37%
2001	14	−2.51%
2011	13	−0.74%

Source: 1902, 1923, 1959 & 1970, 1979, 1989, 2001, 2011

== Images ==
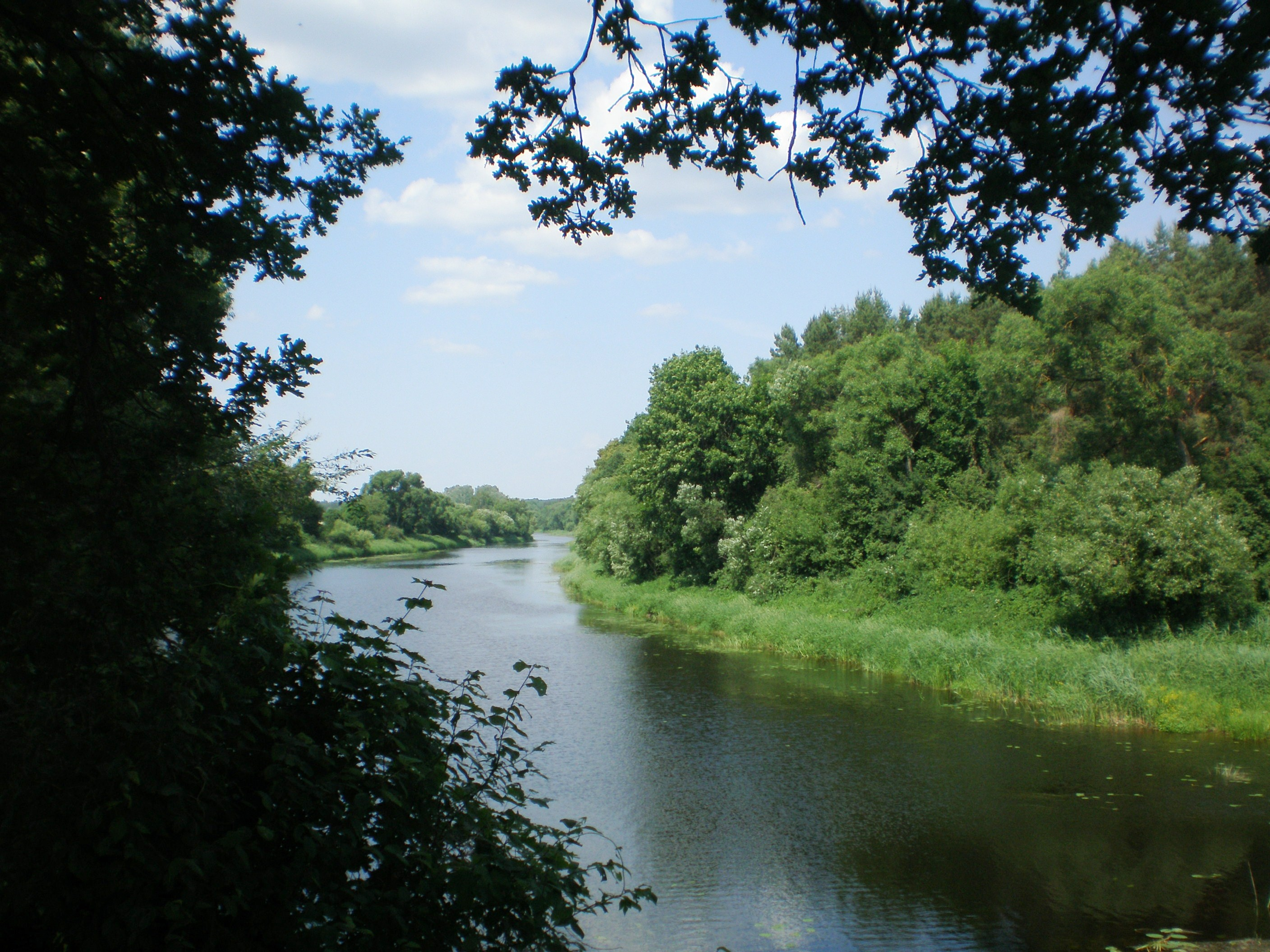
Nevėžis nearby Sūriškiai

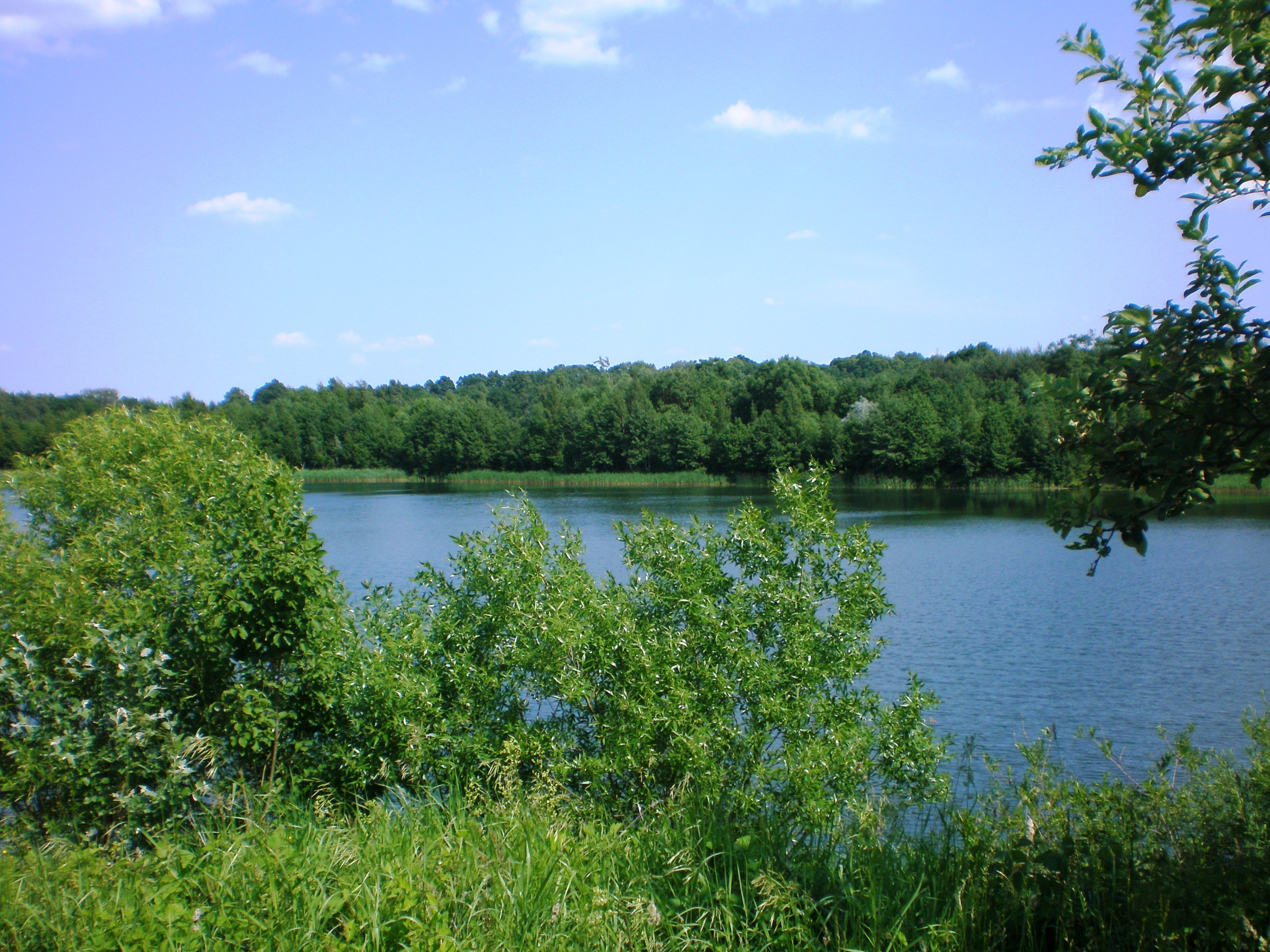
Sūriškiai pond

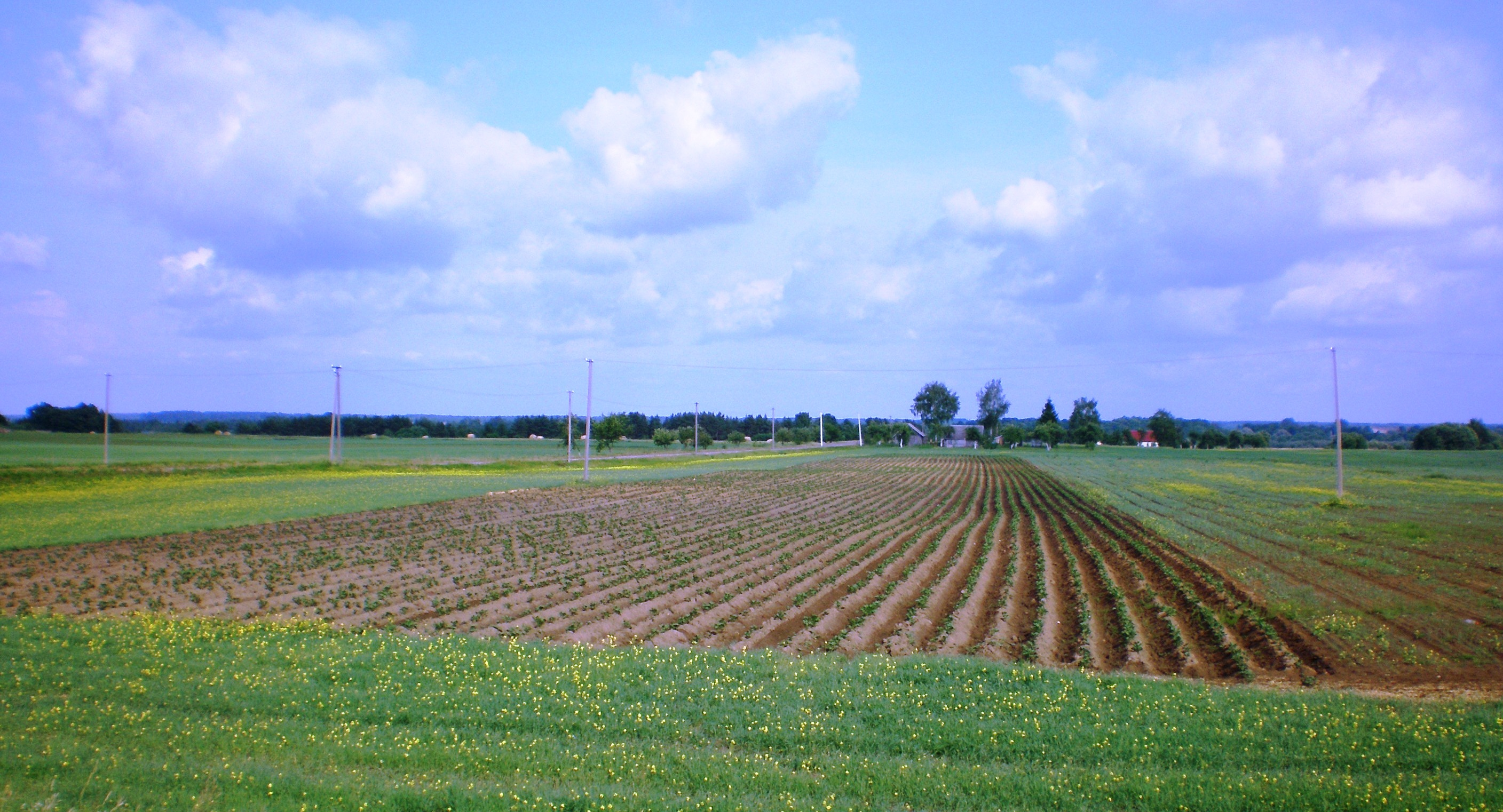
Village from the Kėdainiai-Panevėžys road

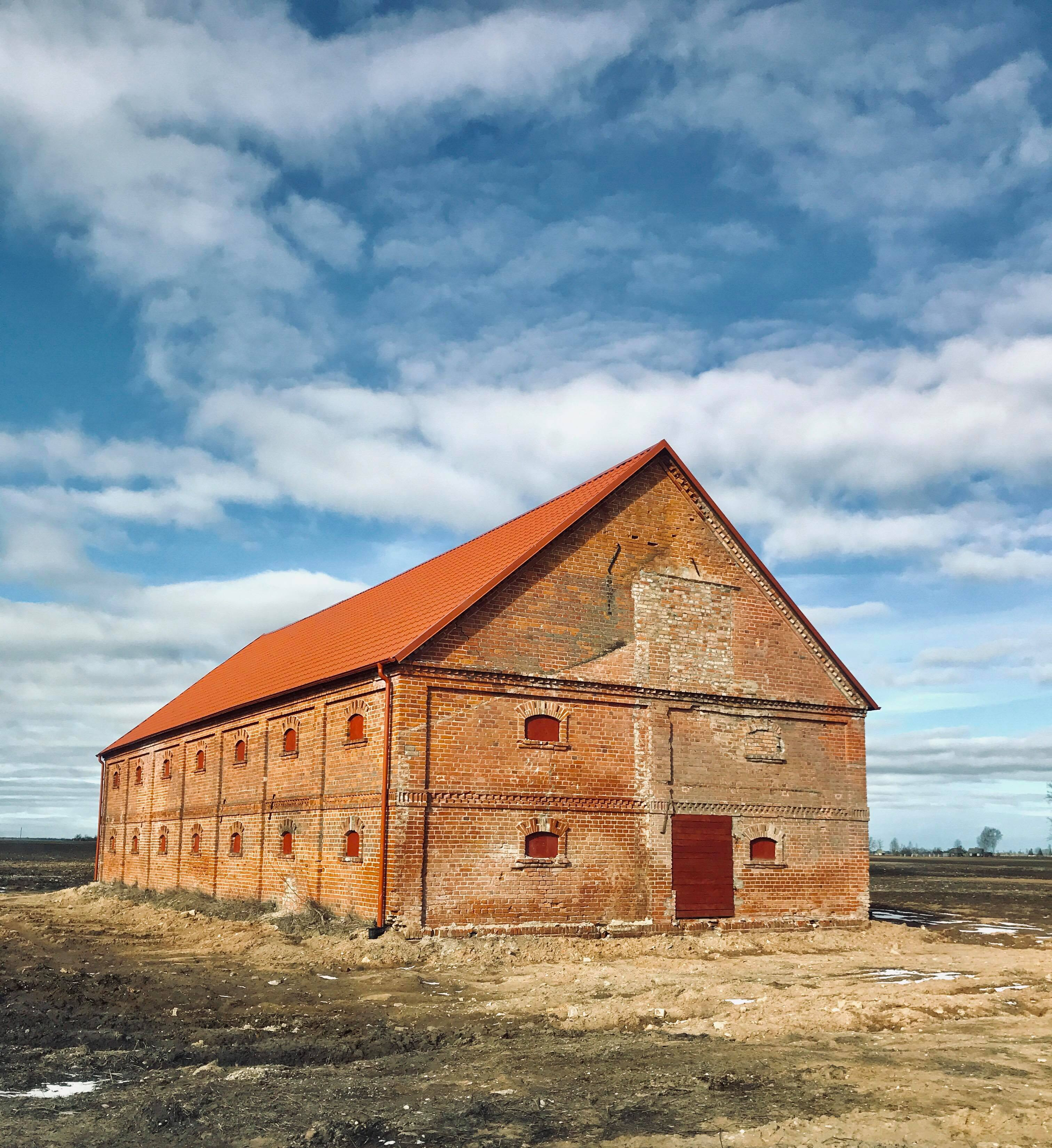
A building from the former manor
