= Gojus, Kėdainiai =

Gojus
- Village
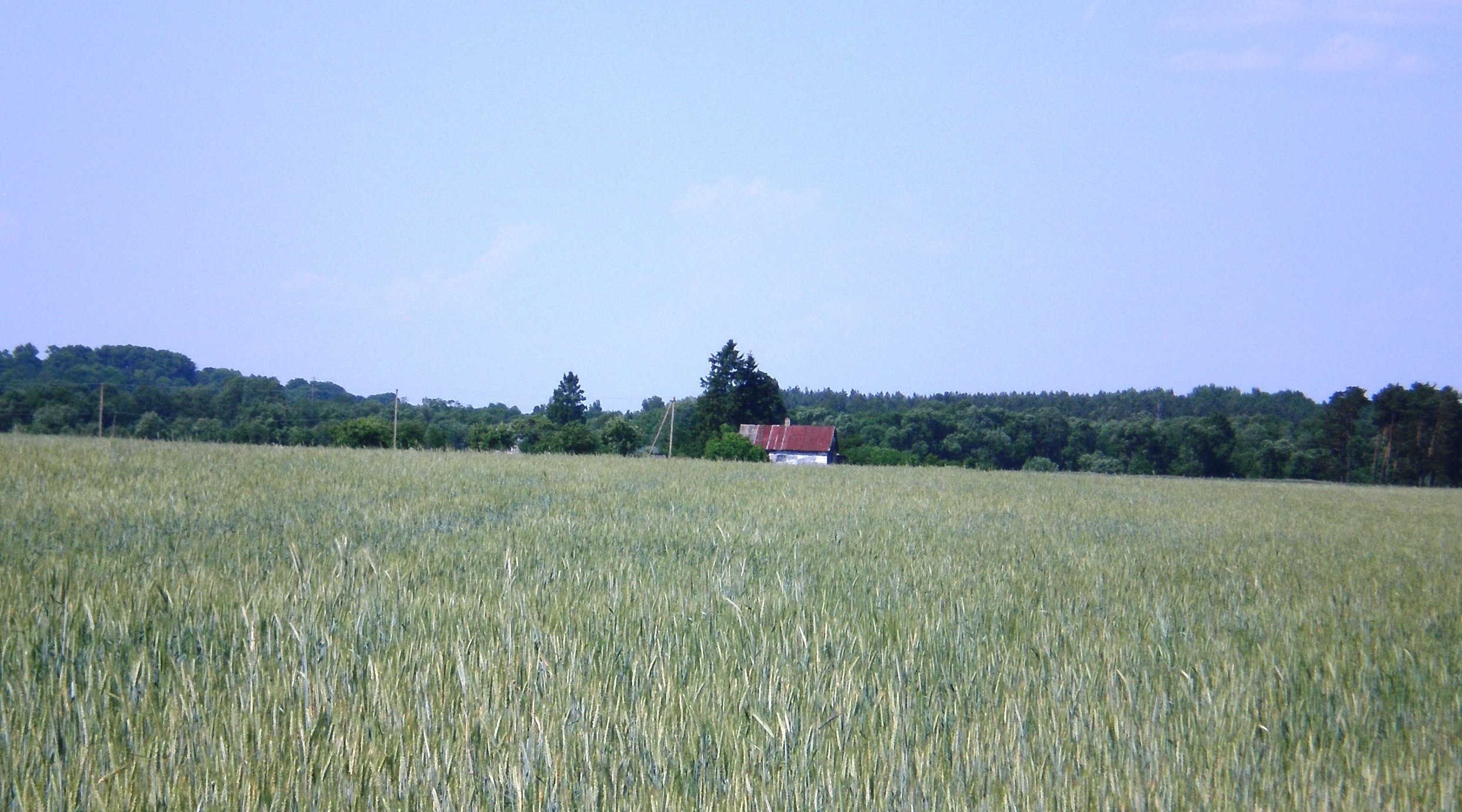

- Location in Lithuania
- Coordinates: 55°25′41″N 24°02′31″E
- Country: Lithuania
- County: Kaunas County
- Municipality: Kėdainiai district municipality
- Eldership: Surviliškis Eldership

Population (2011)
  - Total: 3
- Time zone: UTC+2 (EET)
  - Summer (DST): UTC+3 (EEST)

Gojus ('grove', formerly Polish: Gaj, Russian: Гай) is a village in Kėdainiai district municipality, in Kaunas County, in central Lithuania. According to the 2011 census, the village had a population of 3 people. It is located 2 km from Surviliškis, on the right bank of the Nevėžis river, at the opposite side of Šventybrastis.

== Demography ==
Historical population

Year	Pop.	±% p.a.
1902	17	—
1923	11	−2.05%
1959	18	+1.38%
1970	18	+0.00%

Year	Pop.	±% p.a.
1979	12	−4.41%
1989	7	−5.25%
2001	5	−2.76%
2011	3	−4.98%

Source: 1902, 1923, 1959 & 1970, 1979, 1989, 2001, 2011
