= Kaukalniai =

- Village
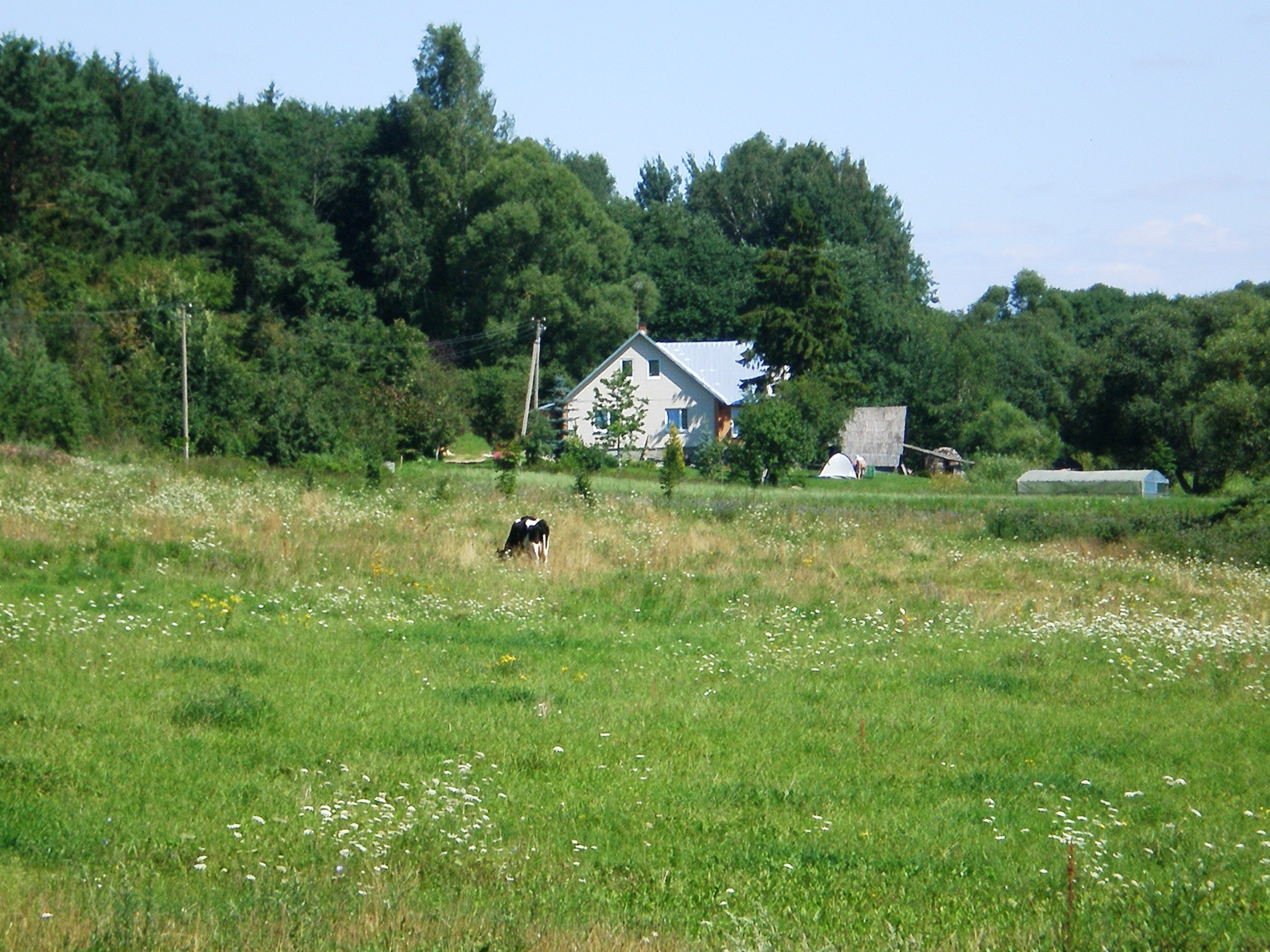

- Location in Lithuania
- Coordinates: 55°28′13″N 24°02′58″E
- Country: Lithuania
- County: Kaunas County
- Municipality: Kėdainiai district municipality
- Eldership: Surviliškis Eldership

Population (2011)
  - Total: 2
- Time zone: UTC+2 (EET)
  - Summer (DST): UTC+3 (EEST)

Kaukalniai ('the hill of kaukas', formerly Polish: Kaukolnie, Russian: Кауколъне) is a village in Kėdainiai district municipality, in Kaunas County, in central Lithuania. According to the 2011 census, the village had a population of 2 people. It is located 3 km from Surviliškis, by the regional road Kėdainiai-Krekenava-Panevėžys.

== Demography ==
Historical population

Year	Pop.	±% p.a.
1902	6	—
1923	37	+9.05%
1959	54	+1.06%
1970	39	−2.92%

Year	Pop.	±% p.a.
1979	22	−6.16%
1989	7	−10.82%
2001	12	+4.59%
2011	2	−16.40%

Source: 1902, 1923, 1959 & 1970, 1979, 1989, 2001, 2011
