= Vitėnai =

- Village
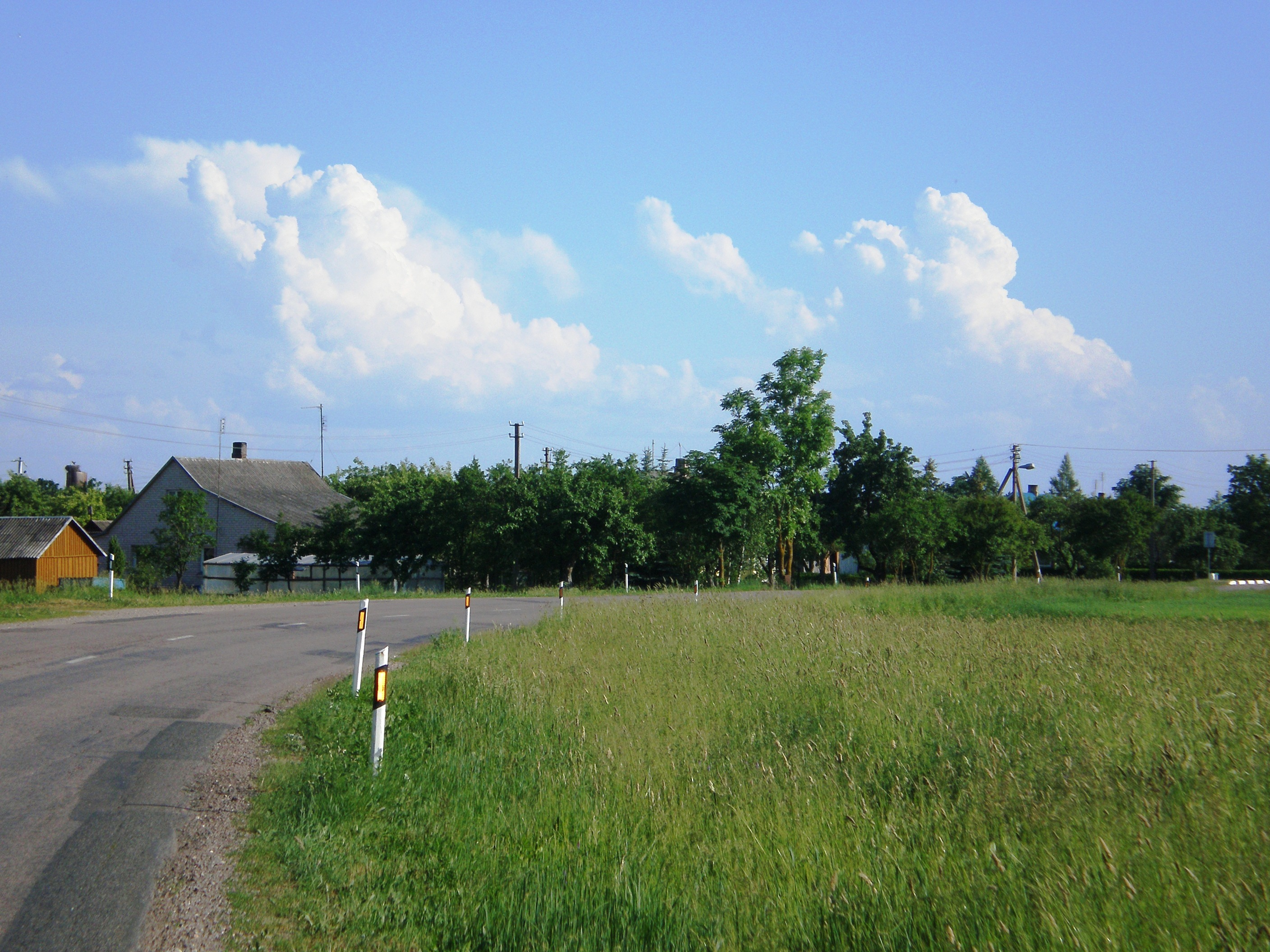

- Location in Lithuania
- Coordinates: 55°23′10″N 24°00′40″E
- Country: Lithuania
- County: Kaunas County
- Municipality: Kėdainiai district municipality
- Eldership: Surviliškis Eldership

Population (2011)
  - Total: 41
- Time zone: UTC+2 (EET)
  - Summer (DST): UTC+3 (EEST)

Vitėnai is a village in Kėdainiai district municipality, in Kaunas County, in central Lithuania. According to the 2011 census, the village has a population of 41 people. It is located 1 km from Kalnaberžė, on the right bank of the Nevėžis river. The regional road Kėdainiai-Krekenava-Panevėžys runs through the village.

== Demography ==
Historical population

Year	Pop.	±% p.a.
1959	154	—
1970	152	−0.12%
1979	81	−6.75%

Year	Pop.	±% p.a.
1989	64	−2.33%
2001	58	−0.82%
2011	41	−3.41%

Source: 1902, 1923, 1959 & 1970, 1979, 1989, 2001, 2011
