= Močėnai =

- Village
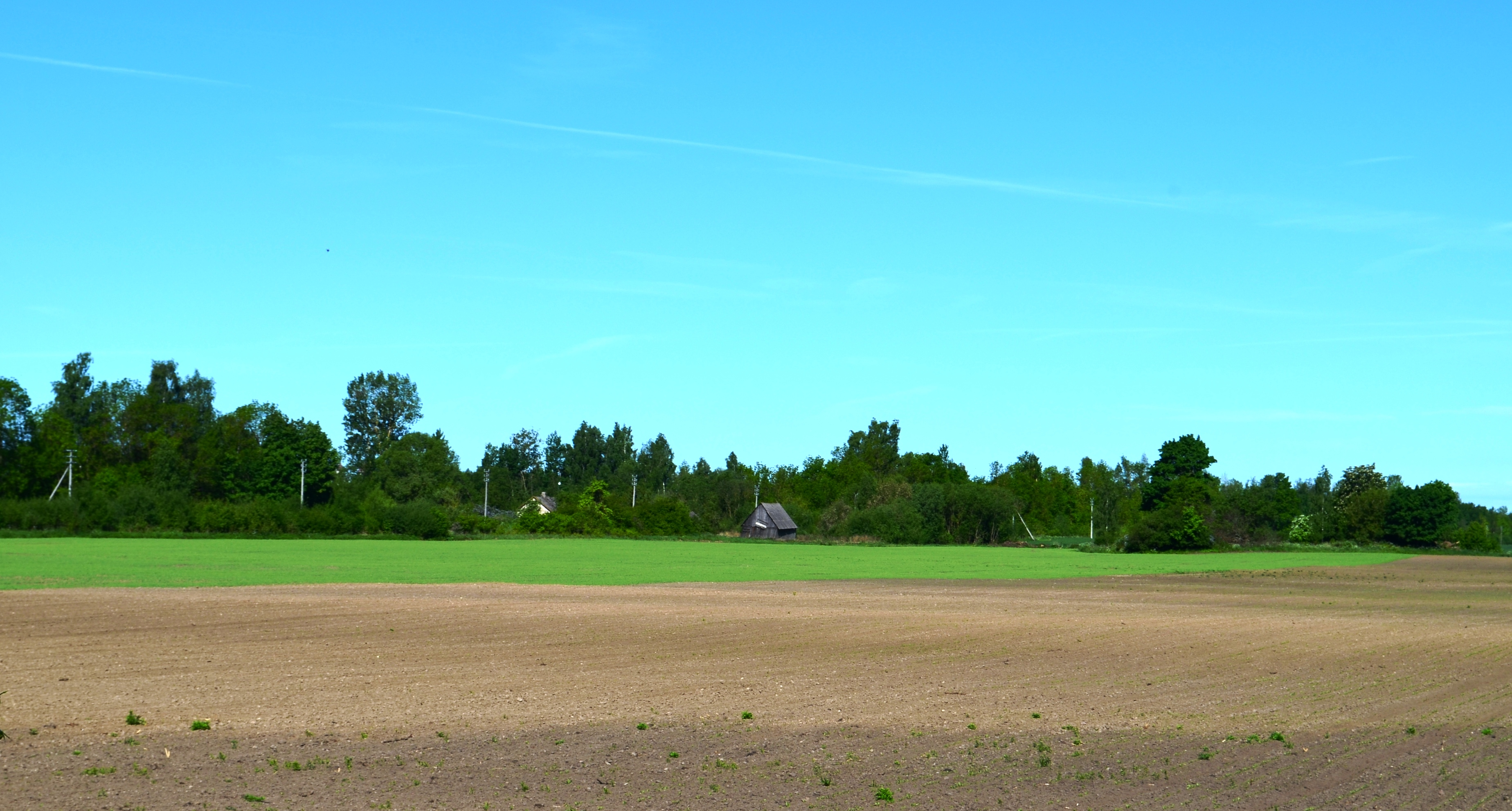

- Location in Lithuania Močėnai (Lithuania)
- Coordinates: 55°22′00″N 23°56′00″E
- Country: Lithuania
- County: Kaunas County
- Municipality: Kėdainiai district municipality
- Eldership: Surviliškis Eldership

Population (2011)
  - Total: 0
- Time zone: UTC+2 (EET)
  - Summer (DST): UTC+3 (EEST)

Močėnai (formerly Polish: Maciany, Russian: Мацяны) is a village in Kėdainiai district municipality, in Kaunas County, in central Lithuania. According to the 2011 census, the village was uninhabited. It is located 2.5 km from Dotnuva, 3.5 km from Sirutiškis, by the rivers of Vensutis and Kruostas. A railway Vilnius-Šiauliai goes by the village.

At the beginning of the 20th century Močėnai was an okolica, where the Baginavičiai, Boreišiai, Beinaravičiai, Citavičiai, Kolnickiai, Liaudanskai, Sipavičiai, Staškevičiai, Jasudavičiai families had their property.

== Demography ==
Historical population

Year	Pop.	±% p.a.
1902	68	—
1923	87	+1.18%
1959	77	−0.34%
1970	45	−4.77%

Year	Pop.	±% p.a.
1979	13	−12.89%
1989	1	−22.62%
2001	5	+14.35%
2011	0	−100.00%

Source: 1902, 1923, 1959 & 1970, 1979, 1989, 2001, 2011
