= Žirnenka =

- Village
- Location in Lithuania
- Coordinates: 55°22′08″N 23°59′38″E
- Country: Lithuania
- County: Kaunas County
- Municipality: Kėdainiai district municipality
- Eldership: Surviliškis Eldership

Population (2011)
  - Total: 0
- Time zone: UTC+2 (EET)
  - Summer (DST): UTC+3 (EEST)

Žirnenka (formerly Russian: Жернянка) is a village in Kėdainiai district municipality, in Kaunas County, in central Lithuania. According to the 2011 census, the village was uninhabited. It is located 1.5 km from Sirutiškis, on the left bank of the Kruostas river.

== Demography ==
Historical population

Year	Pop.	±% p.a.
1902	41	—
1923	15	−4.68%
1959	17	+0.35%
1970	11	−3.88%

Year	Pop.	±% p.a.
1979	8	−3.48%
1989	1	−18.77%
2001	0	−100.00%
2011	0	0.00%

Source: 1902, 1923, 1959 & 1970, 1979, 1989, 2001, 2011
