= Užupė =

- Village
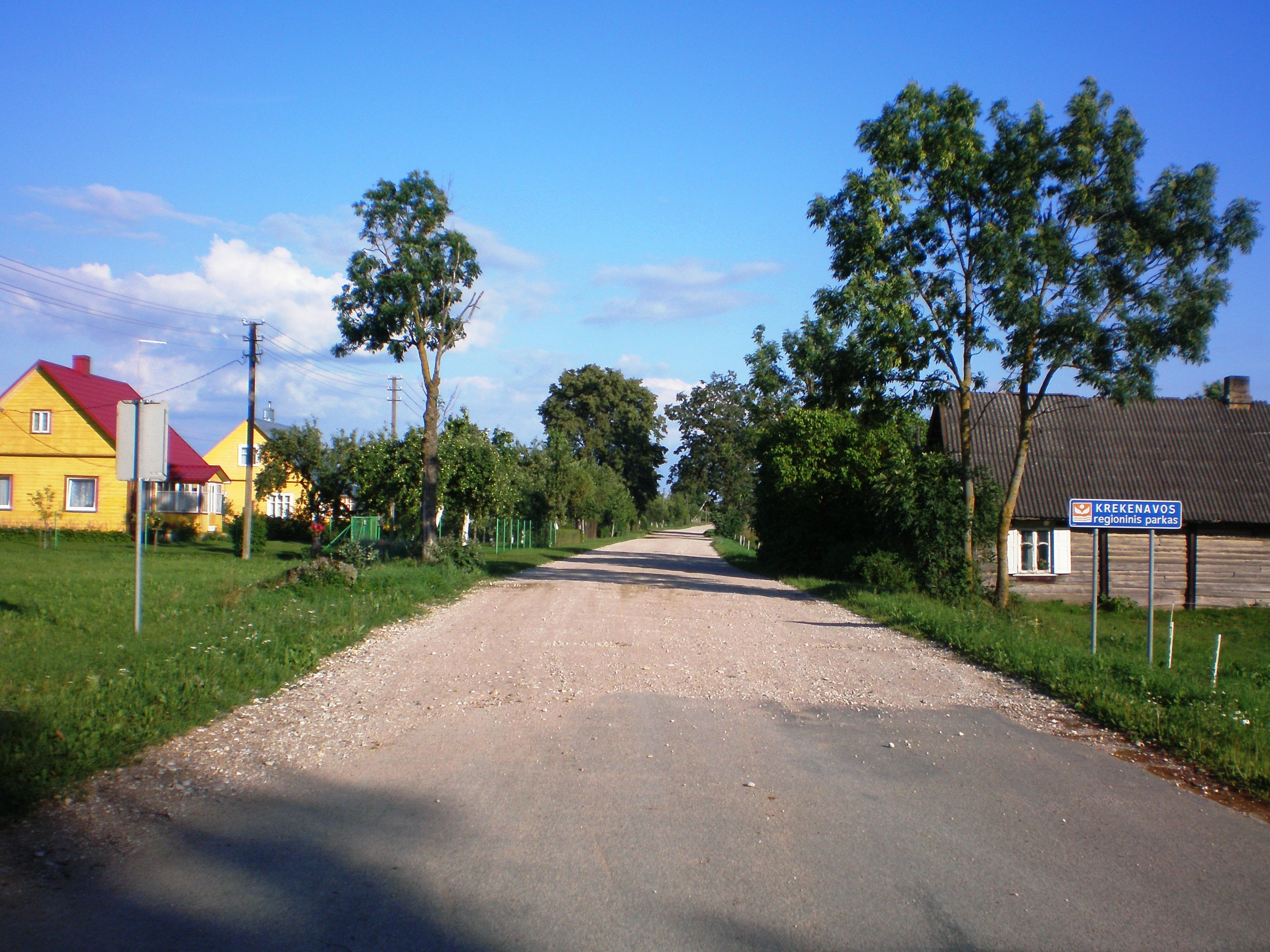

- Location in Lithuania Užupė (Lithuania)
- Coordinates: 55°29′10″N 23°59′49″E
- Country: Lithuania
- County: Kaunas County
- Municipality: Kėdainiai district municipality
- Eldership: Surviliškis Eldership

Population (2011)
  - Total: 95
- Time zone: UTC+2 (EET)
  - Summer (DST): UTC+3 (EEST)

Užupė ('a place across the river', formerly Polish: Użupie, Russian: Ужупе) is a village in Kėdainiai district municipality, in Kaunas County, in central Lithuania. According to the 2011 census, the village has a population of 95 people. It is located 4 km from Surviliškis, by the Liaudė river, inside the Krekenava Regional Park. There are 3 monumental wooden crosses in Užupė.

== History ==
In the 18th century, Užupė was a royal village. 9 families lived in Užupė in 1738. During the Soviet era, Užupė was a subsidiary settlement of Švyturys kolkhoz.

At the beginning of the 21st century, an ancient ritual of sprinkling each other with water before Easter in the hope of better harvest was still observed in Užupė.

== Demography ==
Historical population

Year	Pop.	±% p.a.
1823	190	—
1902	325	+0.68%
1923	287	−0.59%
1959	256	−0.32%
1970	237	−0.70%

Year	Pop.	±% p.a.
1979	204	−1.65%
1987	175	−1.90%
1989	151	−7.11%
2001	126	−1.50%
2011	95	−2.78%

Source: 1902, 1923, 1959 & 1970, 1979, 1989, 2001, 2011
