= Dembnė =

- Village
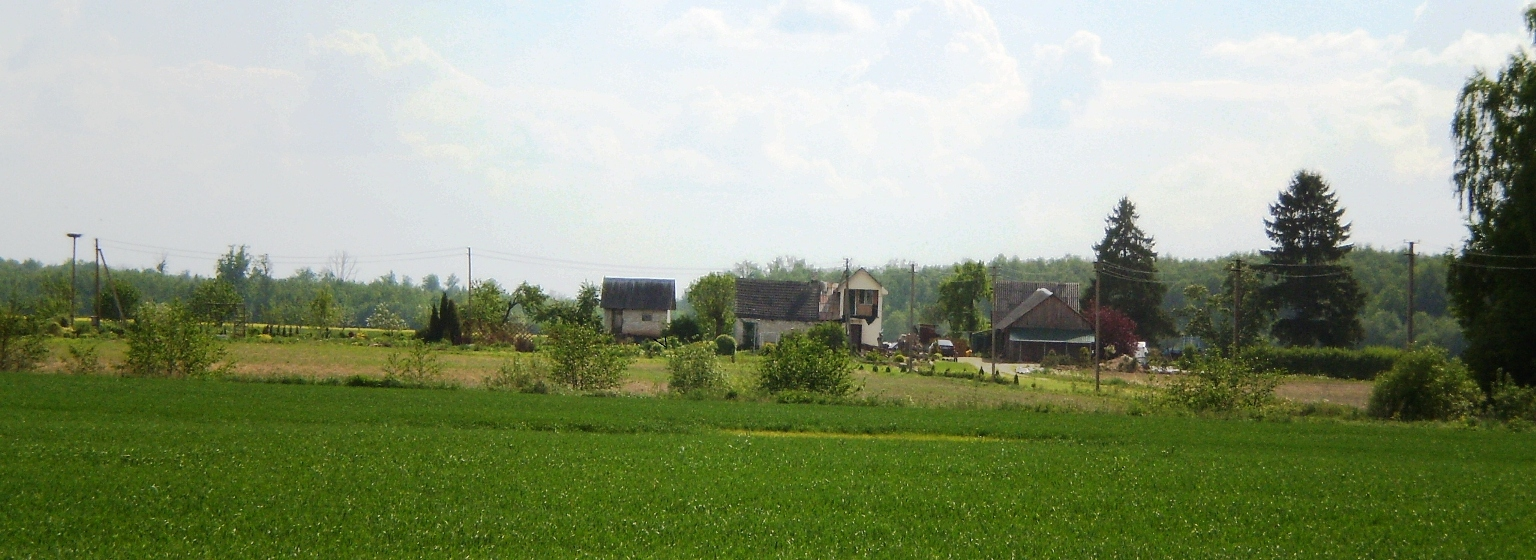

- Location in Lithuania
- Coordinates: 55°25′59″N 23°58′52″E
- Country: Lithuania
- County: Kaunas County
- Municipality: Kėdainiai district municipality
- Eldership: Surviliškis Eldership

Population (2011)
  - Total: 1
- Time zone: UTC+2 (EET)
  - Summer (DST): UTC+3 (EEST)

Dembnė (formerly Polish: Dębno, Russian: Дембно) is a village in Kėdainiai district municipality, in Kaunas County, in central Lithuania. According to the 2011 census, the village had a population of 1 person. It is located 3 km from Šlapaberžė, by the Barškupis river and the outskirts of Kalnaberžė Forest.

== History ==
At the beginning of the 20th century, Dembnė was a village and Gedgaudai family estate in Surviliškis volost.

== Demography ==
Historical population

Year	Pop.	±% p.a.
1902	64	—
1923	47	−1.46%
1959	41	−0.38%
1970	28	−3.41%

Year	Pop.	±% p.a.
1979	11	−9.86%
1989	11	+0.00%
2001	10	−0.79%
2011	1	−20.57%

Source: 1902, 1923, 1959 & 1970, 1979, 1989, 2001, 2011
