= Lomeikiškiai =

- Village
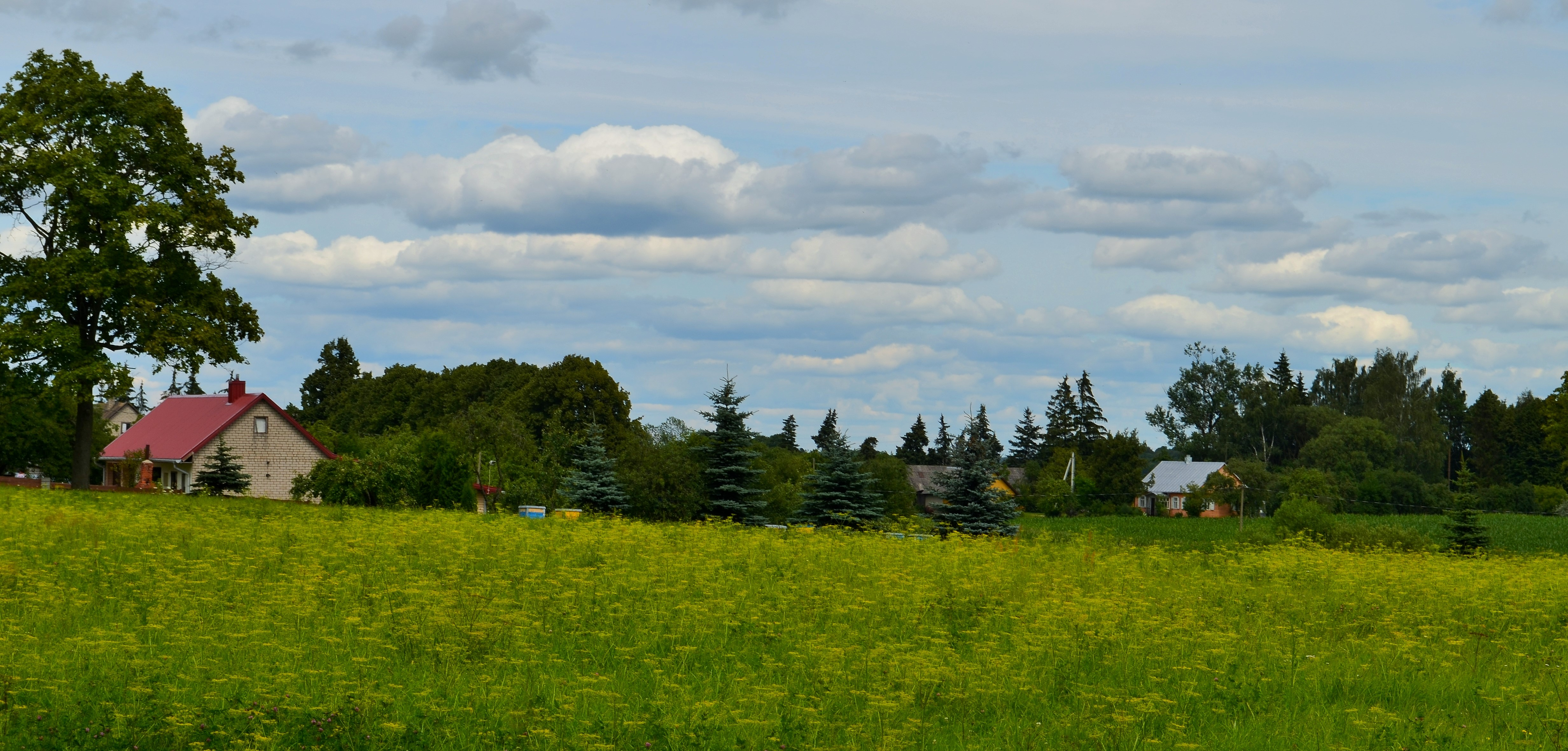

- Location in Lithuania
- Coordinates: 55°22′59″N 24°00′11″E
- Country: Lithuania
- County: Kaunas County
- Municipality: Kėdainiai district municipality
- Eldership: Surviliškis Eldership

Population (2011)
  - Total: 16
- Time zone: UTC+2 (EET)
  - Summer (DST): UTC+3 (EEST)

Lomeikiškiai is a village in Kėdainiai district municipality, in Kaunas County, in central Lithuania. According to the 2011 census, the village had a population of 16 people. It is located 2 km from Kalnaberžė, on the right bank of the Nevėžis river. There is a hillfort (Krasauskas hill) in the Nevėžis valley.

== Demography ==
Historical population

Year	Pop.	±% p.a.
1959	41	—
1970	41	+0.00%
1979	16	−9.93%

Year	Pop.	±% p.a.
1989	20	+2.26%
2001	13	−3.53%
2011	16	+2.10%

Source: 1902, 1923, 1959 & 1970, 1979, 1989, 2001, 2011

== Images ==
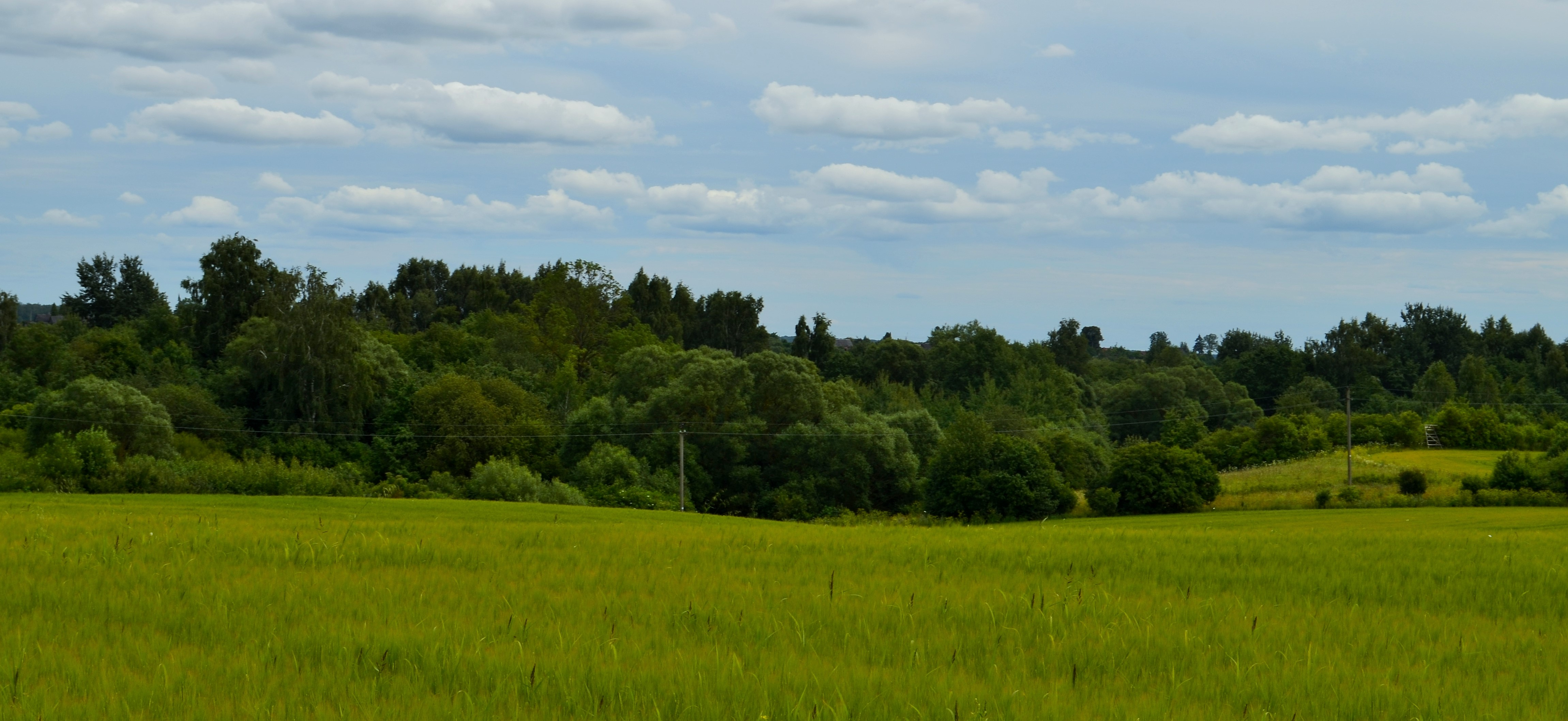
Lomeikiškiai hillfort covered by trees
