= Čireliai =

- Village
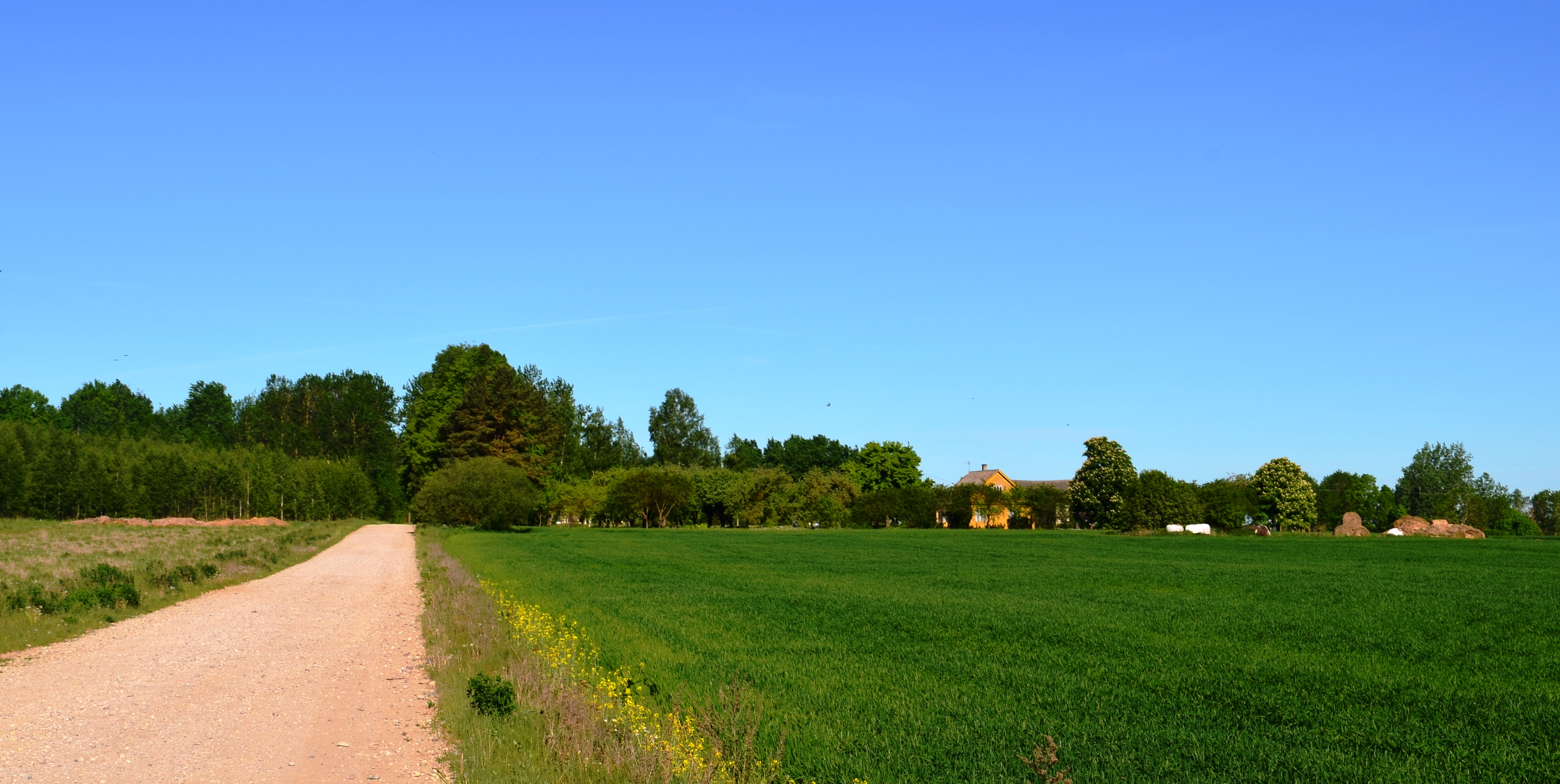

- Location in Lithuania
- Coordinates: 55°21′40″N 23°57′50″E
- Country: Lithuania
- County: Kaunas County
- Municipality: Kėdainiai district municipality
- Eldership: Surviliškis Eldership

Population (2011)
  - Total: 9
- Time zone: UTC+2 (EET)
  - Summer (DST): UTC+3 (EEST)

Čireliai (formerly Polish: Czyrele) is a village in Kėdainiai district municipality, in Kaunas County, in central Lithuania. According to the 2011 census, the village had a population of 9 people. It is located 4 km from Kėdainiai, 1 km from Sirutiškis by the Kruostas, Baltupis and Vensutis rivers.

== History ==
At the beginning of the 20th century, Čireliai was an estate of Sipowicze family.

== Demography ==
Historical population

Year	Pop.	±% p.a.
1923	23	—
1959	15	−1.18%
1970	26	+5.13%
1979	16	−5.25%

Year	Pop.	±% p.a.
1989	14	−1.33%
2001	12	−1.28%
2011	9	−2.84%

Source: 1902, 1923, 1959 & 1970, 1979, 1989, 2001, 2011
