= Pociūnėliai =

- Town
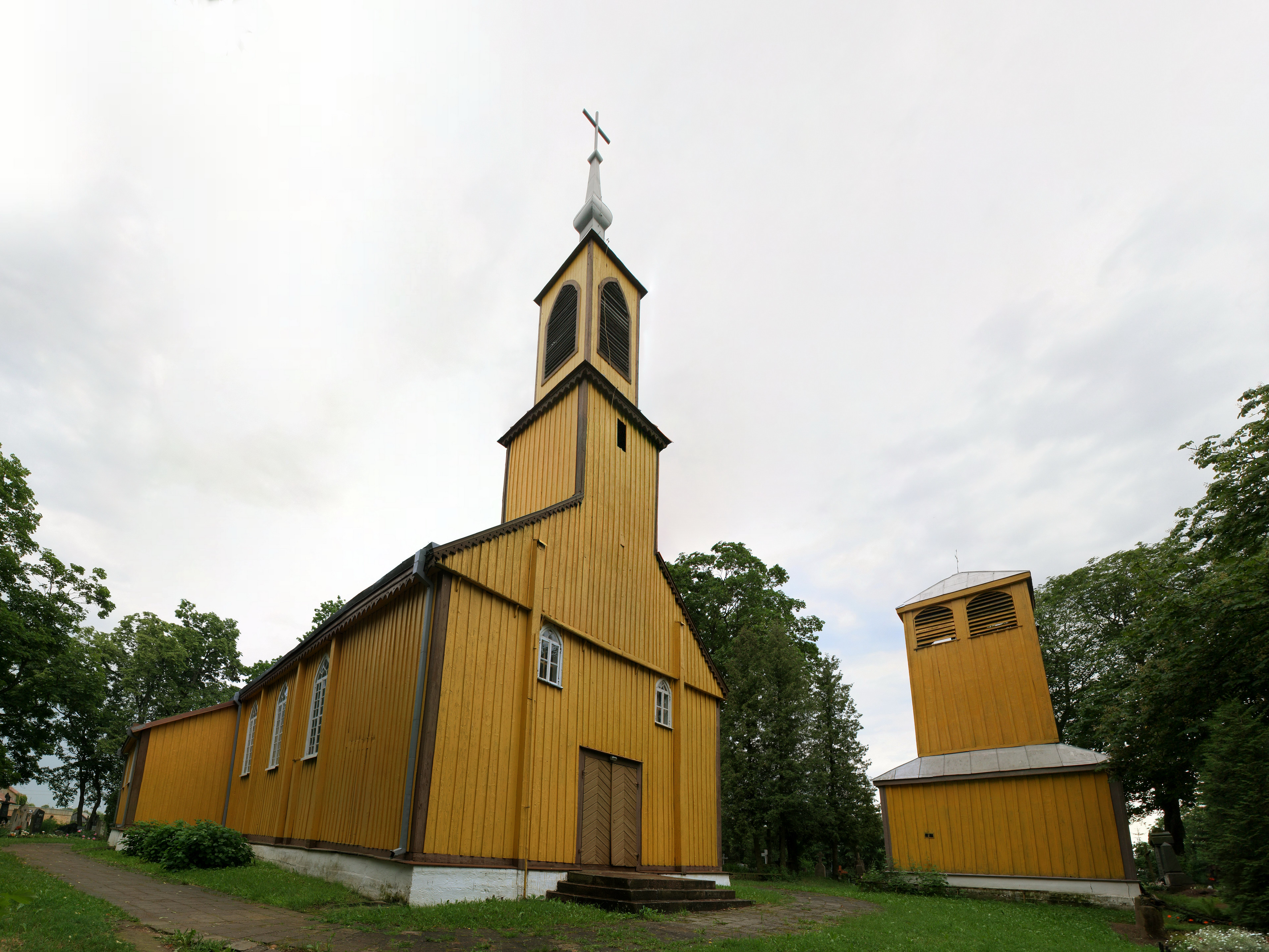

- Location in Lithuania
- Coordinates: 55°34′10″N 23°52′10″E
- Country: Lithuania
- Ethnographic region: Samogitia
- County: Šiauliai County

Population (2011)
  - Total: 475
- Time zone: UTC+2 (EET)
  - Summer (DST): UTC+3 (EEST)

Pociūnėliai is a small town in Šiauliai County in the Samogitia cultural region of northern-central Lithuania. As of 2011 it had a population of 475.
