= Liaudė =

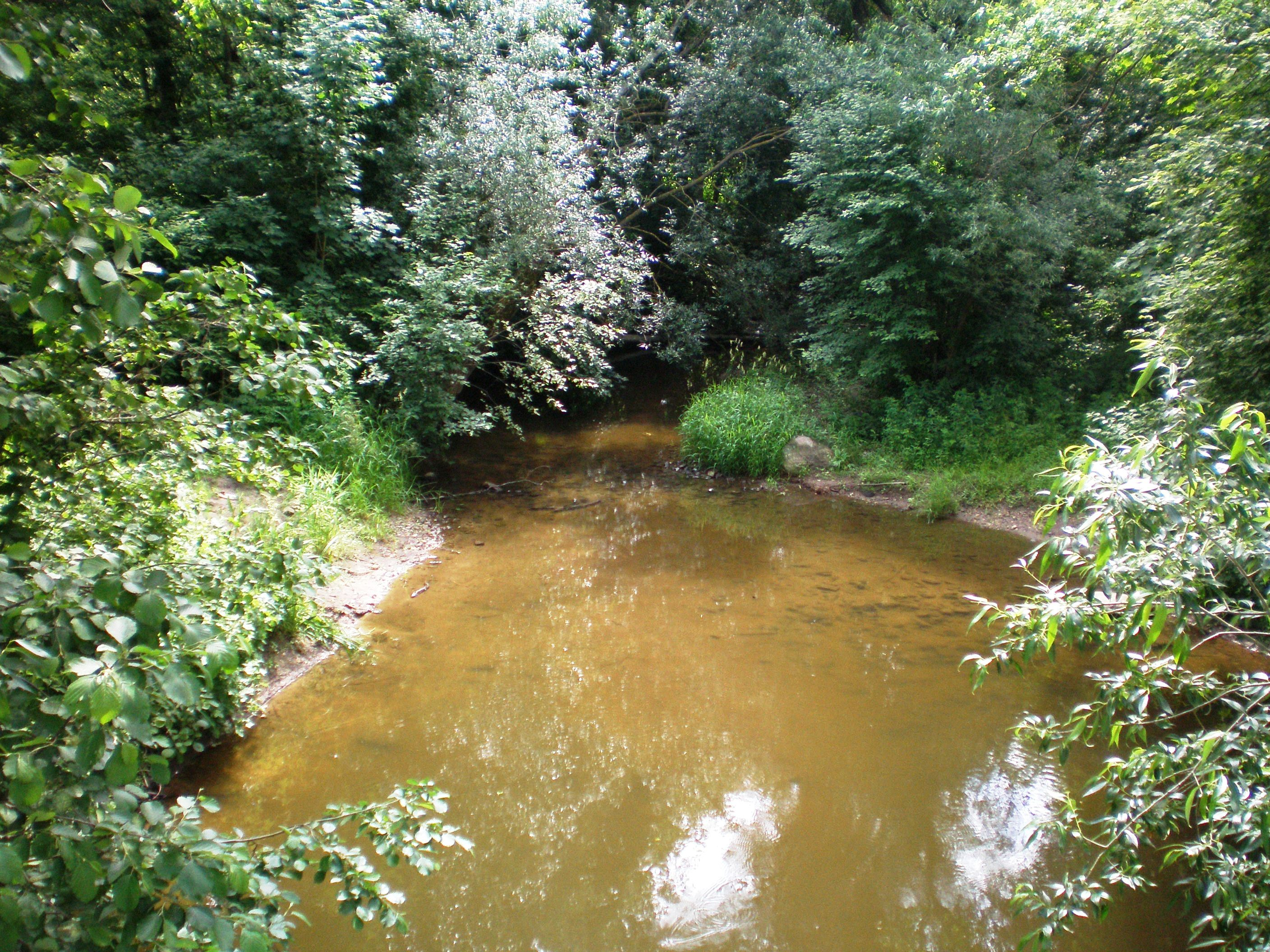
- Liaudė in Paberžė

Location
- Country: Lithuania
- Region: Kėdainiai district municipality, Radviliškis district municipality, Panevėžys district municipality

Physical characteristics
- Source
  - location: Pociūnėliai surroundings
- Mouth: Nevėžis, near Surviliškis
  - coordinates: 55°27′52″N 24°03′16″E
- Length: 39.2 km (24.4 mi)
- Basin size: 183.5 km^{2} (70.8 sq mi)
- Discharge
  - average: 0.68 m³/s

Basin features
- Progression: Nevėžis→ Neman→ Baltic Sea
- Tributaries
  - left: Kiemsrutas
  - right: Nykis, Viešnautas

The Liaudė is a river in central Lithuania, flowing through Kėdainiai district municipality, Radviliškis district municipality and Panevėžys district municipality. It flows for 39.2 kilometres (24.4 mi) and has a basin area of 183.5 km^{2} (70.8 sq mi). It is a right tributary of the Nevėžis river.

The river originates by the Vakarai village near Pociūnėliai. It flows in a southeasterly direction, passing Pociūnėliai, Žibartoniai, Paberžė and Užupė. It meets the Nevėžis 2 km from Surviliškis town.

The width of the river course is 5–8 m, the depth is 0.4–1.1 m. The rapidness of the flow is 0.2 meters per second at the upper course and 0.4 meters per second at the lower course.

Following ponds are dammed on the Liaudė river: Pociūnėliai pond, Rūtakiemis pond, Žibartoniai 1st pond, Žibartoniai 2nd pond.

The hydronym Liaudė is of obscure origin, possible explanation is from the root *laud- (as Lithuanian: liaudis 'people, crowd') or it could be of the Finno-Ugric origin (ex. Estonian: laud 'moist').
