= Surviliškis =

- Town
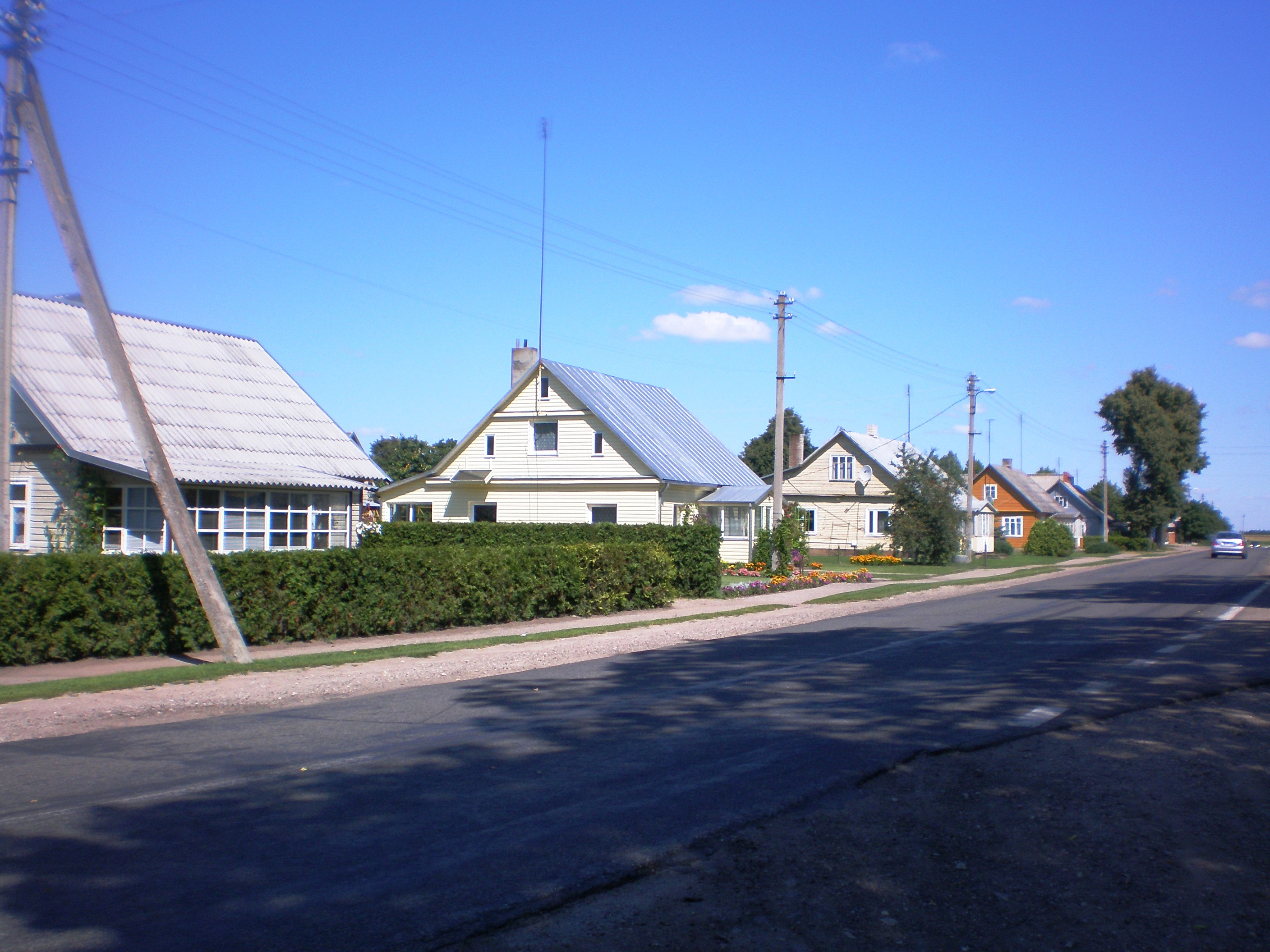

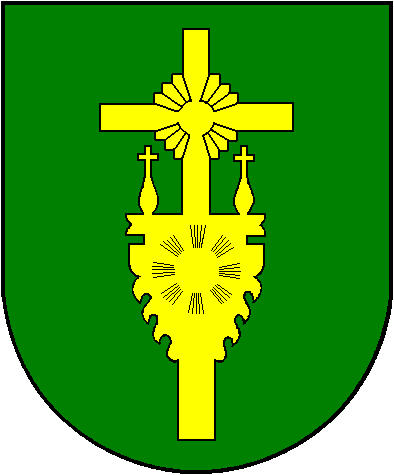
- Coat of arms

- Location in Lithuania Surviliškis (Lithuania)
- Coordinates: 55°27′0″N 24°02′10″E
- Country: Lithuania
- Ethnographic region: Aukštaitija
- County: Kaunas County
- Municipality: Kėdainiai District Municipality
- Eldership: Surviliškis Eldership
- First mentioned: 1500

Population (2011)
  - Total: 351
- Time zone: UTC+2 (EET)
  - Summer (DST): UTC+3 (EEST)

Surviliškis is a small town in Kaunas County in central Lithuania, 18 km from Kėdainiai, on the right bank of the Nevėžis river. In 2011 it had a population of 351. There are wooden Catholic church of Jesus (built in 1791), wooden chapel in cemetery (built in 1800), wooden cross of local crossmaking master Vincas Svirskis, wayside chapel of St. Mary, school, library, medicine station. The regional road Kėdainiai-Krekenava-Panevėžys runs through the town.

== History ==
The toponym Surviliškis comes from personal name Survila or Survilas.

Surviliškis Manor was first mentioned in 1500. The first church was built in 1505 and till the 19th century Surviliškis was a property of the Samogitian bishop. Surviliškis has been known as a town since 1587. Surviliškis Manor was parcelled in 1929. During the Soviet era, it was a selsovet center and "Švyturys" ('lighthouse') kolkhoz center.

== Demography ==
Historical population

Year	Pop.	±% p.a.
1868	250	—
1902	300	+0.54%
1923	427	+1.70%
1959	233	−1.67%
1970	265	+1.18%
1979	357	+3.37%

Year	Pop.	±% p.a.
1982	360	+0.28%
1987	377	+0.93%
1989	364	−1.74%
2001	376	+0.27%
2011	351	−0.69%

Source: 1902, 1923, 1959 & 1970, 1979, 1989, 2001, 2011

== Images ==
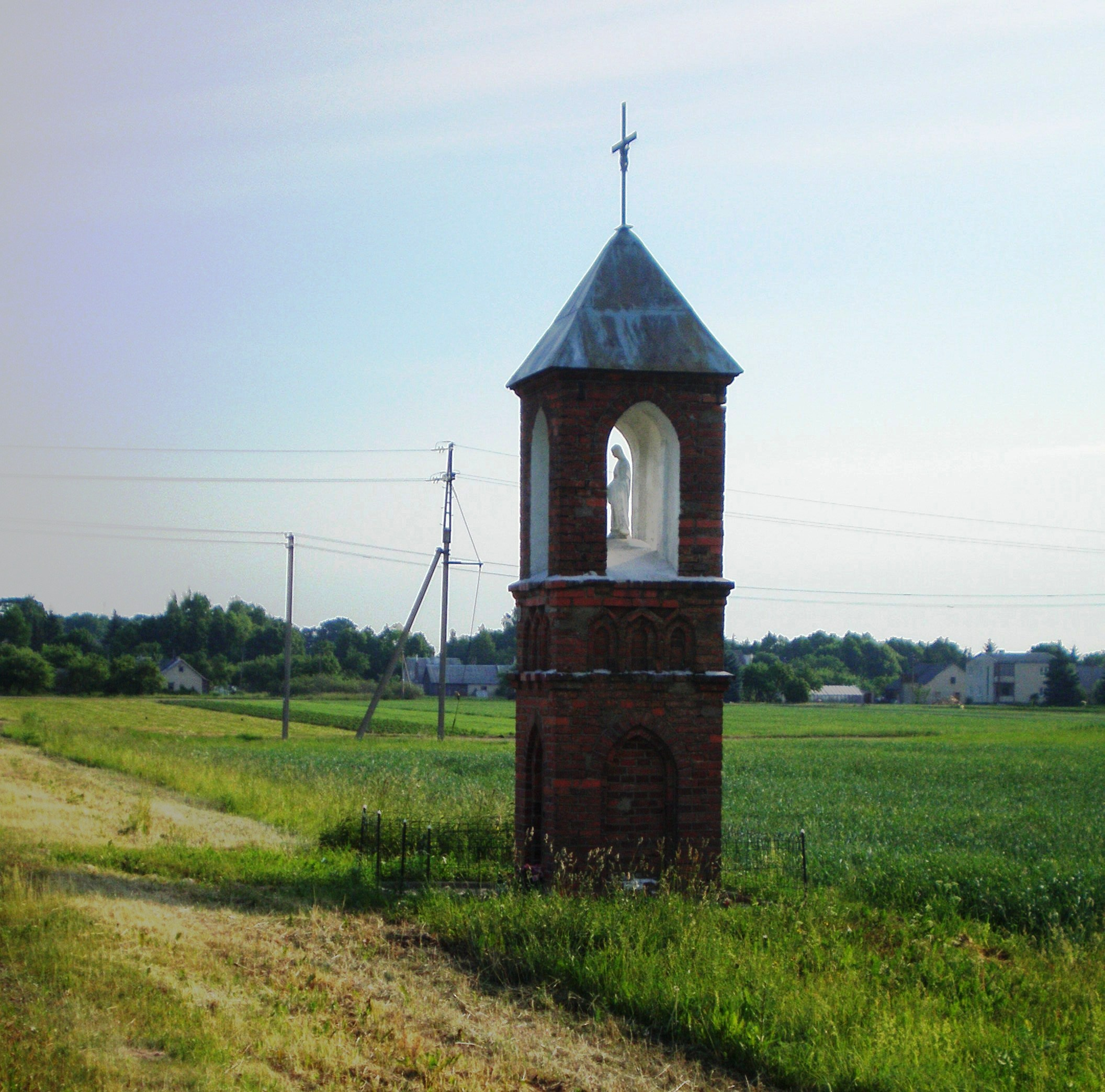
St. Mary wayside chapel

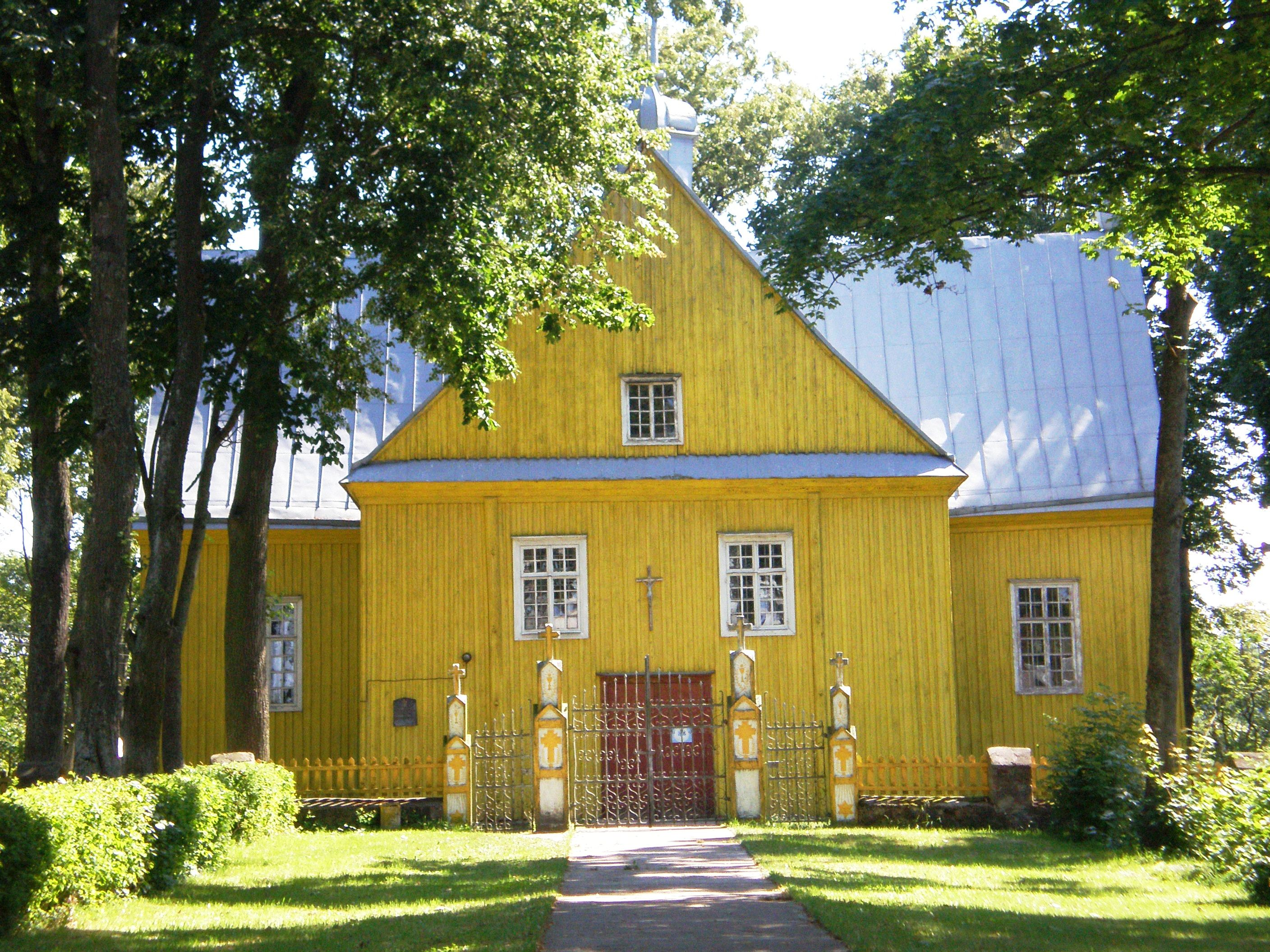
Church

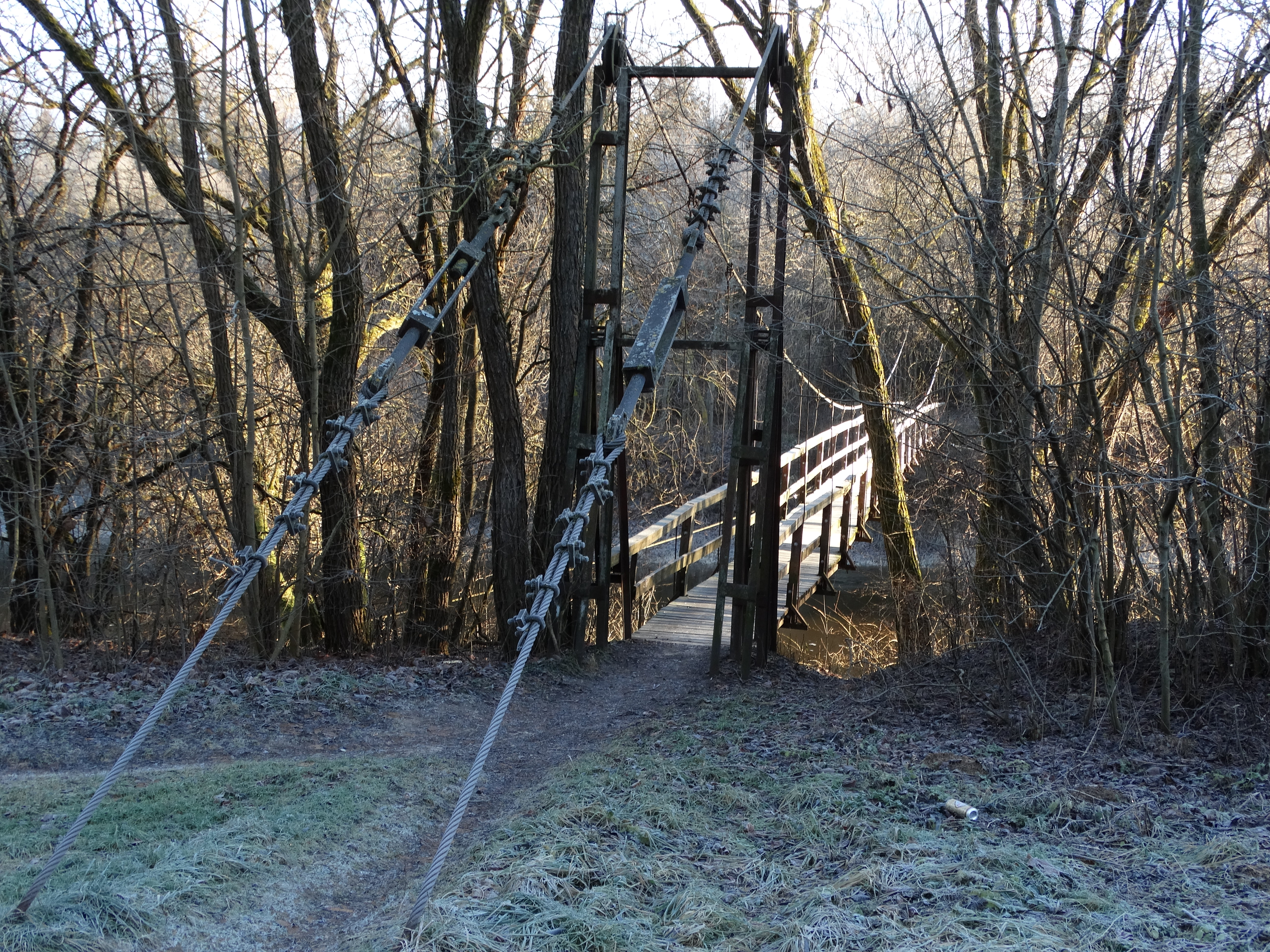
Footbridge over Nevėžis

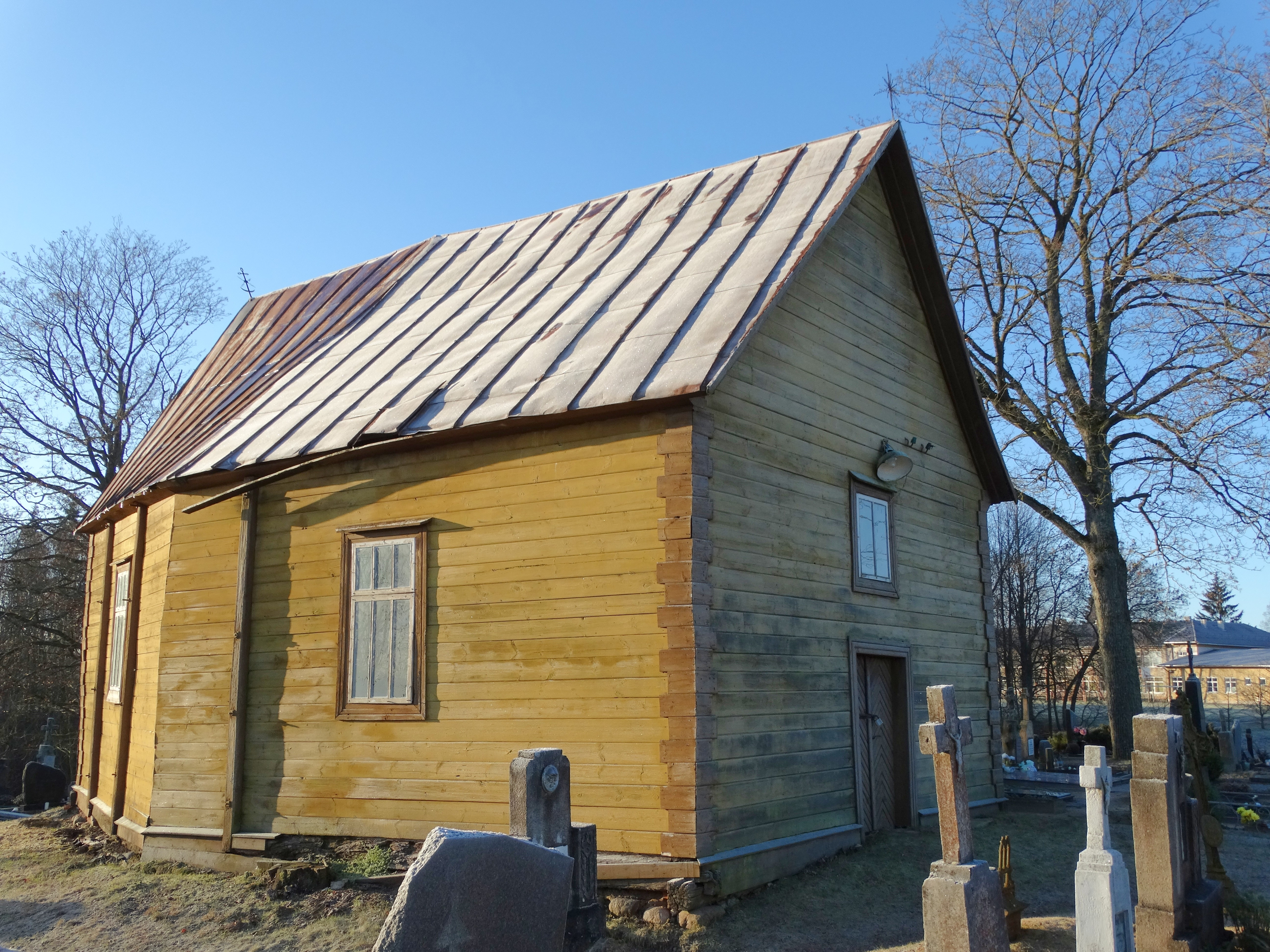
Cemetery chapel
