= Krekenava Regional Park =

Regional park in central Lithuania

- IUCN category V (protected landscape/seascape)
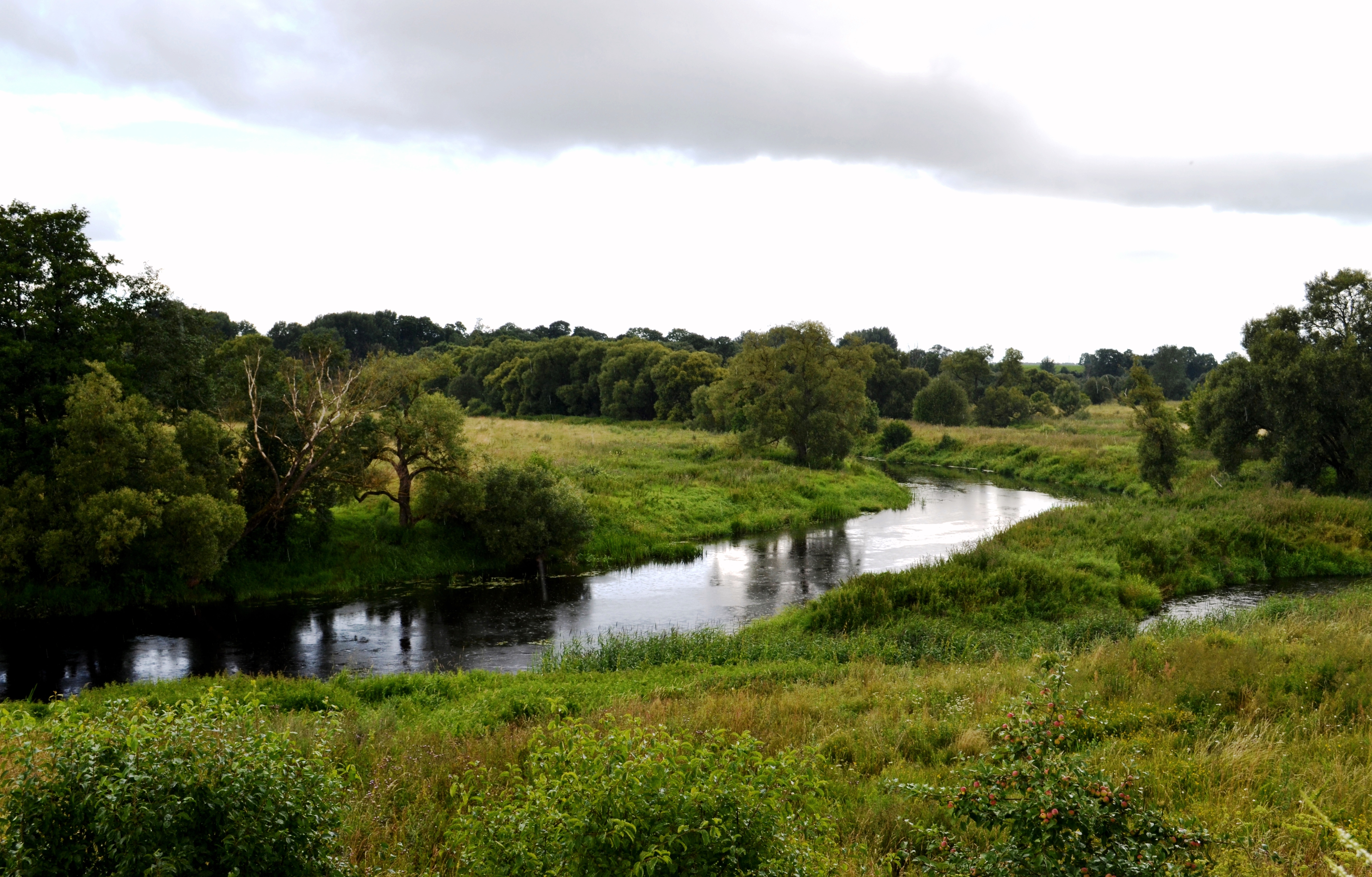
- The Nevėžis river near Gringaliai village

- Location within Lithuania
- Location: Panevėžys District Municipality and Kėdainiai District Municipality, Lithuania
- Nearest town: Krekenava
- Coordinates: 55°30′N 24°04′E
- Area: 115.89 km^{2} (44.75 sq mi)
- Established: 1992
- Governing body: Lithuanian Service of Protected Areas
- Website: krekenavosrp.lrv.lt

Krekenava Regional Park (Lithuanian: Krekenavos regioninis parkas) is regional park in central Lithuania, mostly in the southern part of Panevėžys District Municipality (a small part in Kėdainiai District Municipality). It was established in 1992 and covers 11,589.7 hectares (28,639 acres).

Krekenava Regional Park encompasses the Nevėžis river middle course and various culture and nature monuments amongst Krekenava, Ramygala and Surviliškis towns.

== Nature ==
43% of the territory is covered by forests (the main forested area is Pašiliai Forest). There are some old oak groves. 1019 plant species are detected in the park, 31 of them are protected. The Nevėžis and its tributaries' valleys are significant nature area because of natural meadows. There Campanula bononiensis, Corydalis cava, Pedicularis sceptrum-carolinum, brown galingale, Orchis militaris, Teucrium scordium grow.

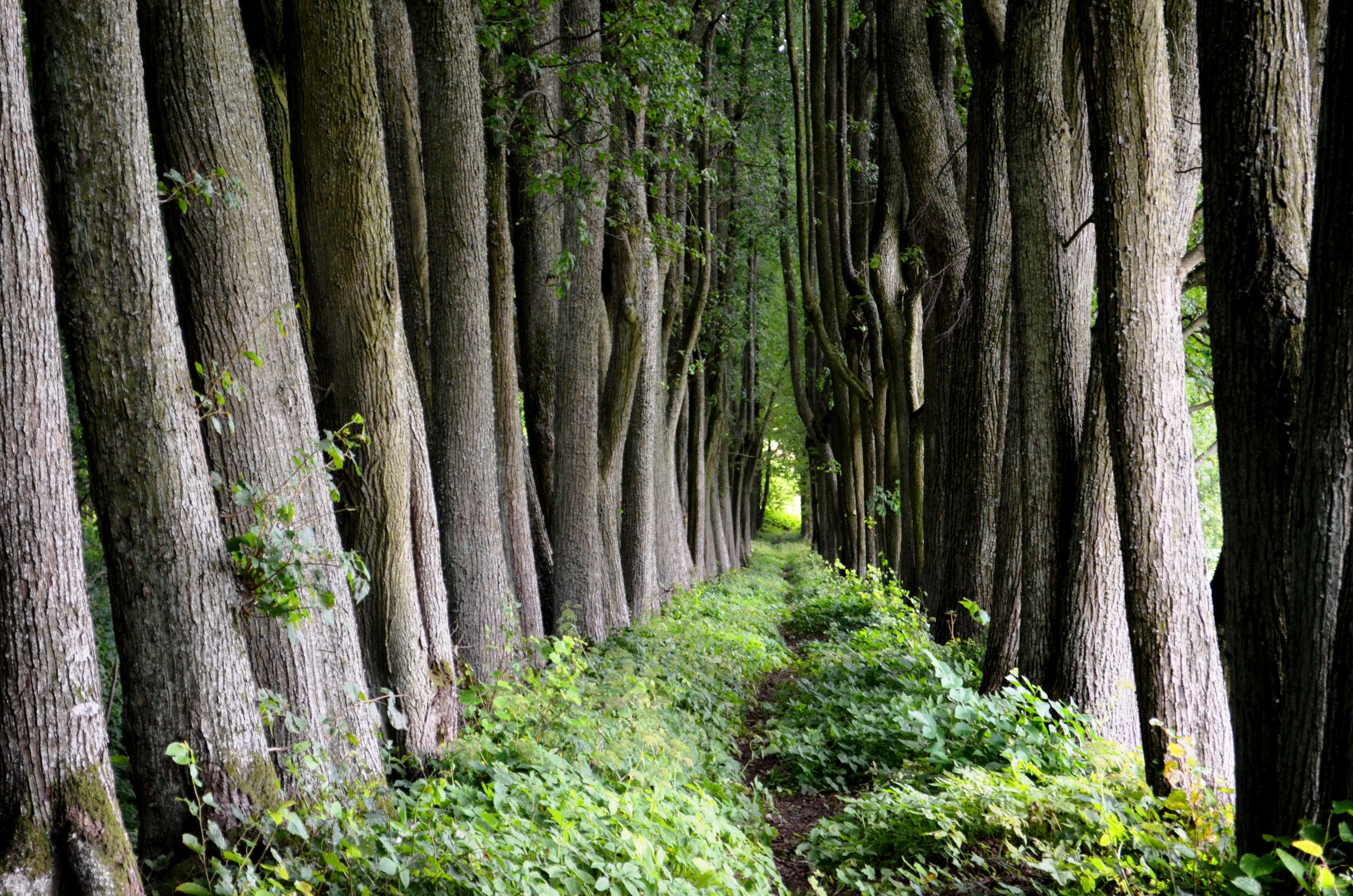
Daniliškis Lime Tree Alley

There are 846 animal species in the park, among them are the Eurasian otter, common pipistrelle, white hare, natterjack toad, northern crested newt. Pašiliai wisent stall (established in 1969) was the first place in Lithuania, where this animal was reintroduced. Now, part of the herd roams freely, while some are kept in the stall. There are roe deer, wild boar, red deer, fallow deer, Eurasian beaver aplenty.

160 species of birds nest in Krekenava Regional Park. From the rarer species the black stork, lesser spotted eagle, grey-headed woodpecker, European green woodpecker, northern goshawk, goosander, northern shoveler could be mentioned.

Rare insect species as the clouded Apollo, tufted skipper, hermit beetle, European stag beetle, Ergates faber live in the park.

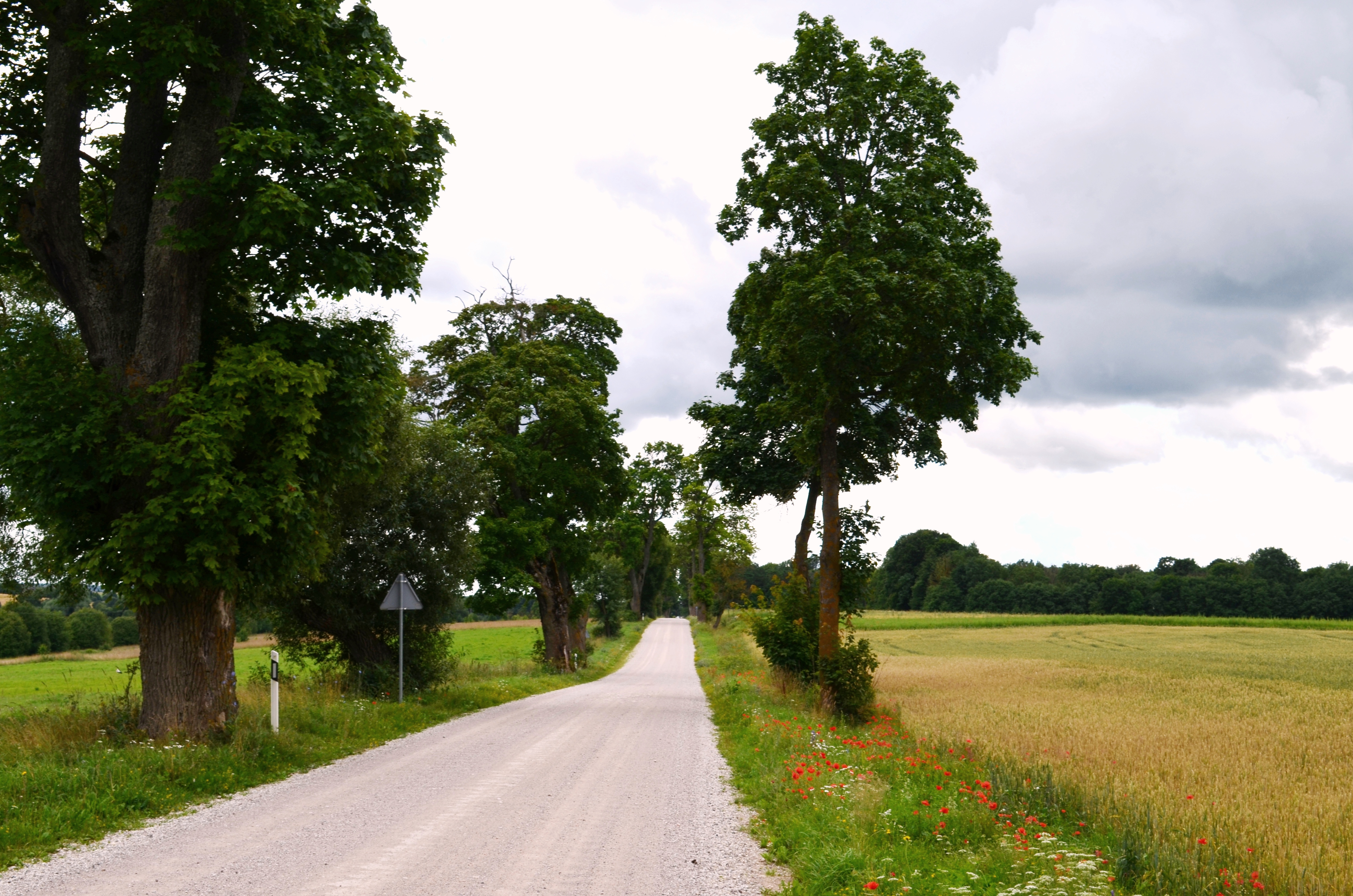
A countryside road near Vadaktai

There are some nature monuments:

- The 'Rapolas' stone (compassing 14.54 meters) on the bank of the Linkava river;
- The Daniliškis Lime Tree Alley (length 285 meters, consists from 350 lime trees) in Daniliškis village;
- The Kalnelis Polytrunked Pine Tree (has 3 main trunks and many subsidiary trunks), near Kalnelis village;
- The Gringaliai Forest Oak Tree
- The Gringaliai Forest Spruce Tree

== Culture ==
There are many cultural monuments in the park, such as historical Bakainiai hillfort in Bakainiai village, on the bank of the Liaudė river, Upytė hillfort, famous as the former estate place where semi-legendary nobleman Čičinskas lived, Burveliai village with an ancient offering hill (alkakalnis) and mythological stone, also Barinė ancient burial place.

Rodai II village hosts a chapel-mausoleum (build in 1861) of the Szwojnicki noblemen family. There are relics of former water mill, distillery and copper foundry in Linkavičiai (former Slabada estate). Ustronė village hosts an old barn (from the 19th century) where the unique Book smuggling museum have been established by Juozas Tumas-Vaižgantas. There is Stultiškiai windmill (build in 1880) with a flax industry exposition. Krekenava town is famous of historicist Assumption church (build in 1902), also Upytė town and Vadaktėliai village have wooden churches. Famous cross maker Vincas Svirskis lived in Surviliškis surroundings. His wooden crosses' relics still remain in Iciūnai and Mučiūnai villages, also one is preserved in the Krekenava church.

== Images ==
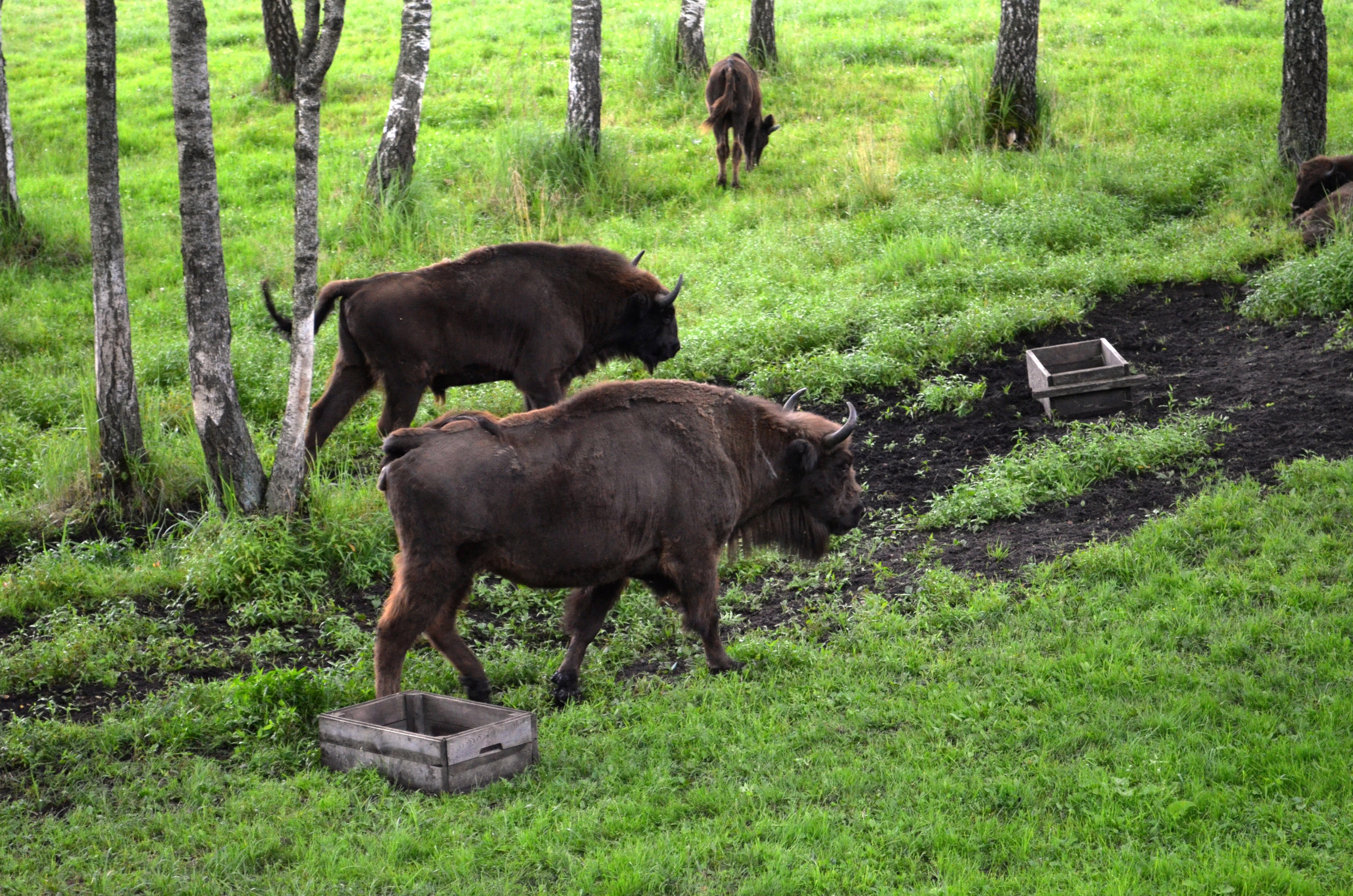
Wisents in Pašiliai wisent stall

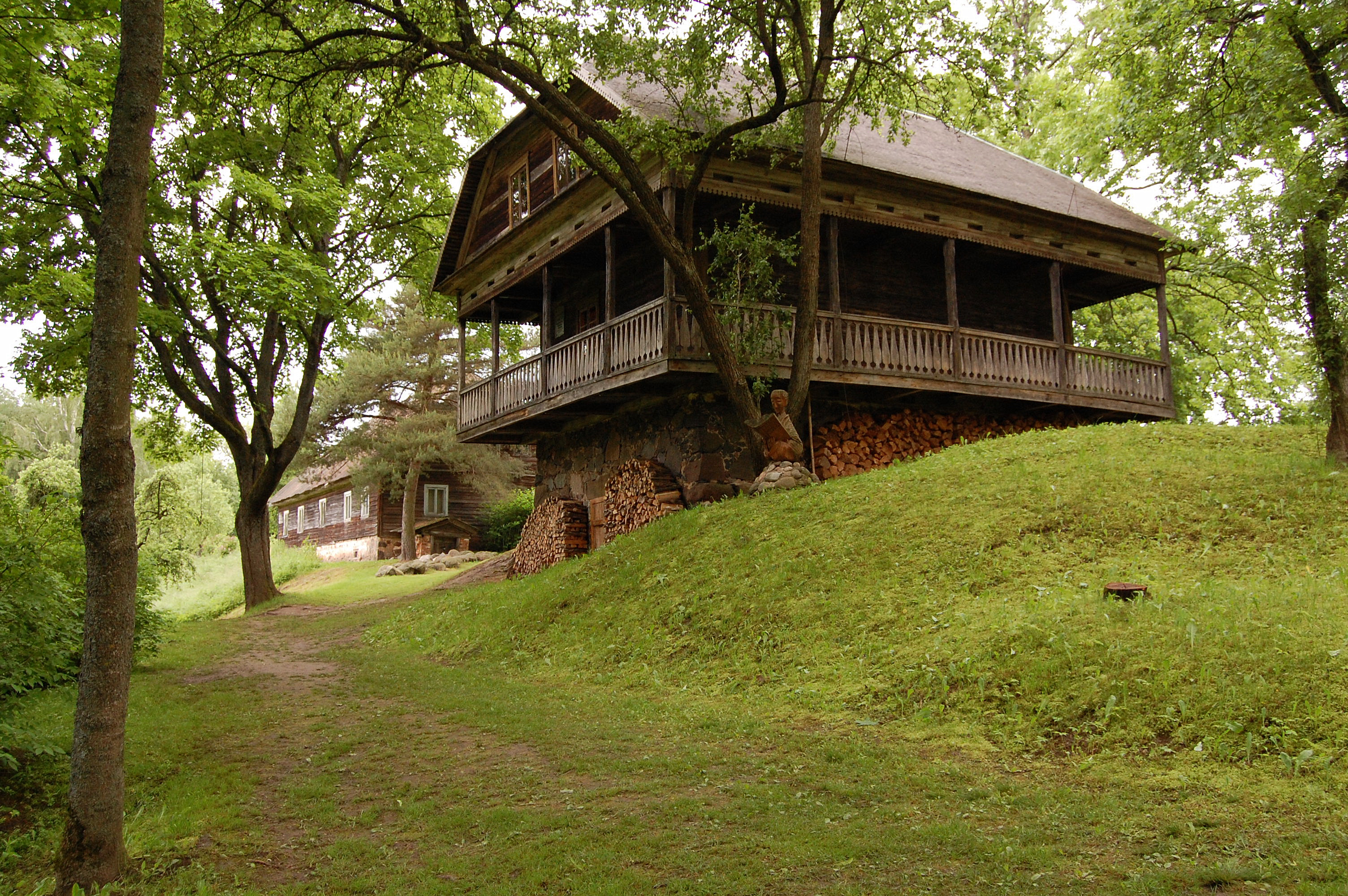
The Book smuggling museum in Ustronė

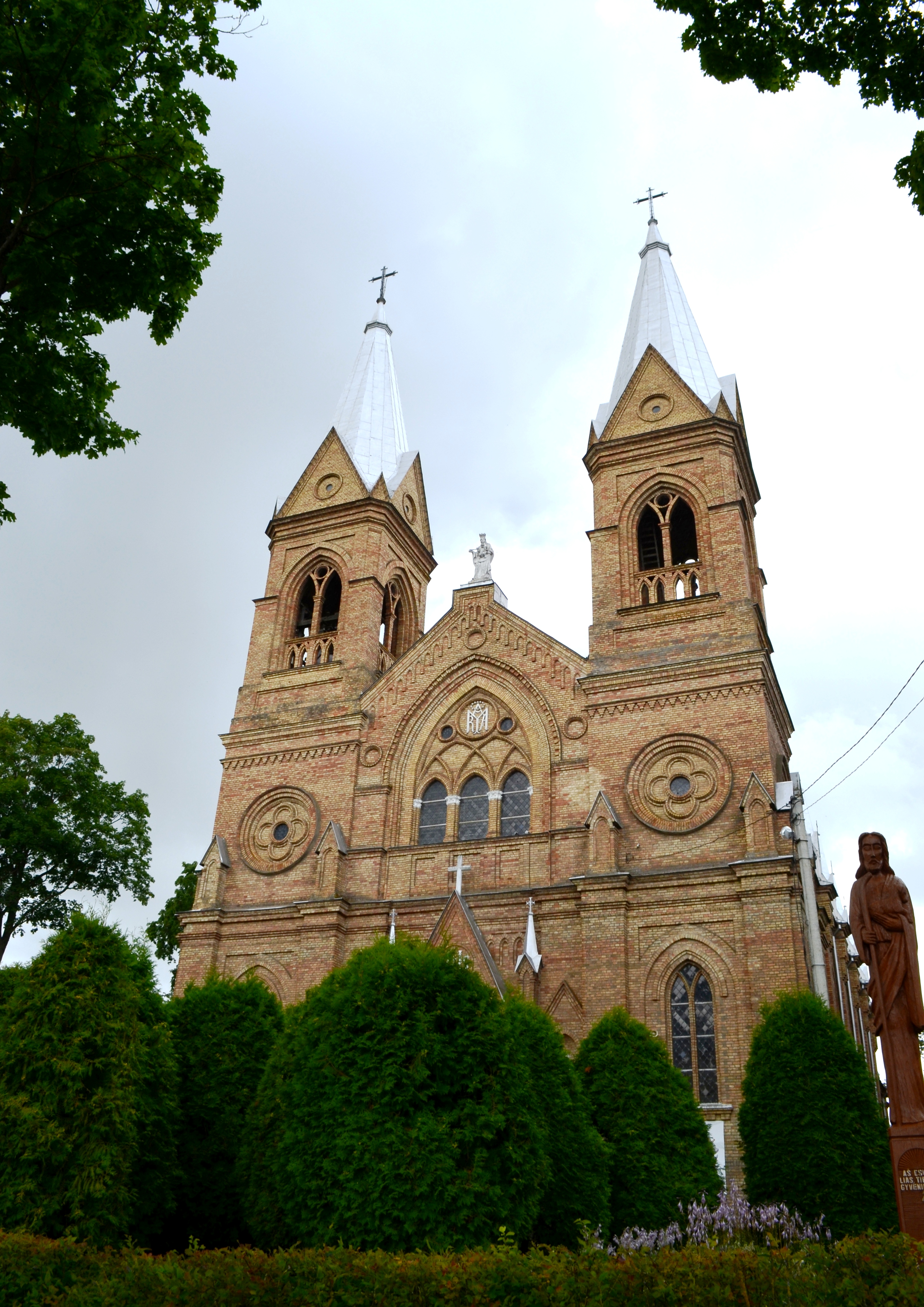
Church of the Assumption in Krekenava

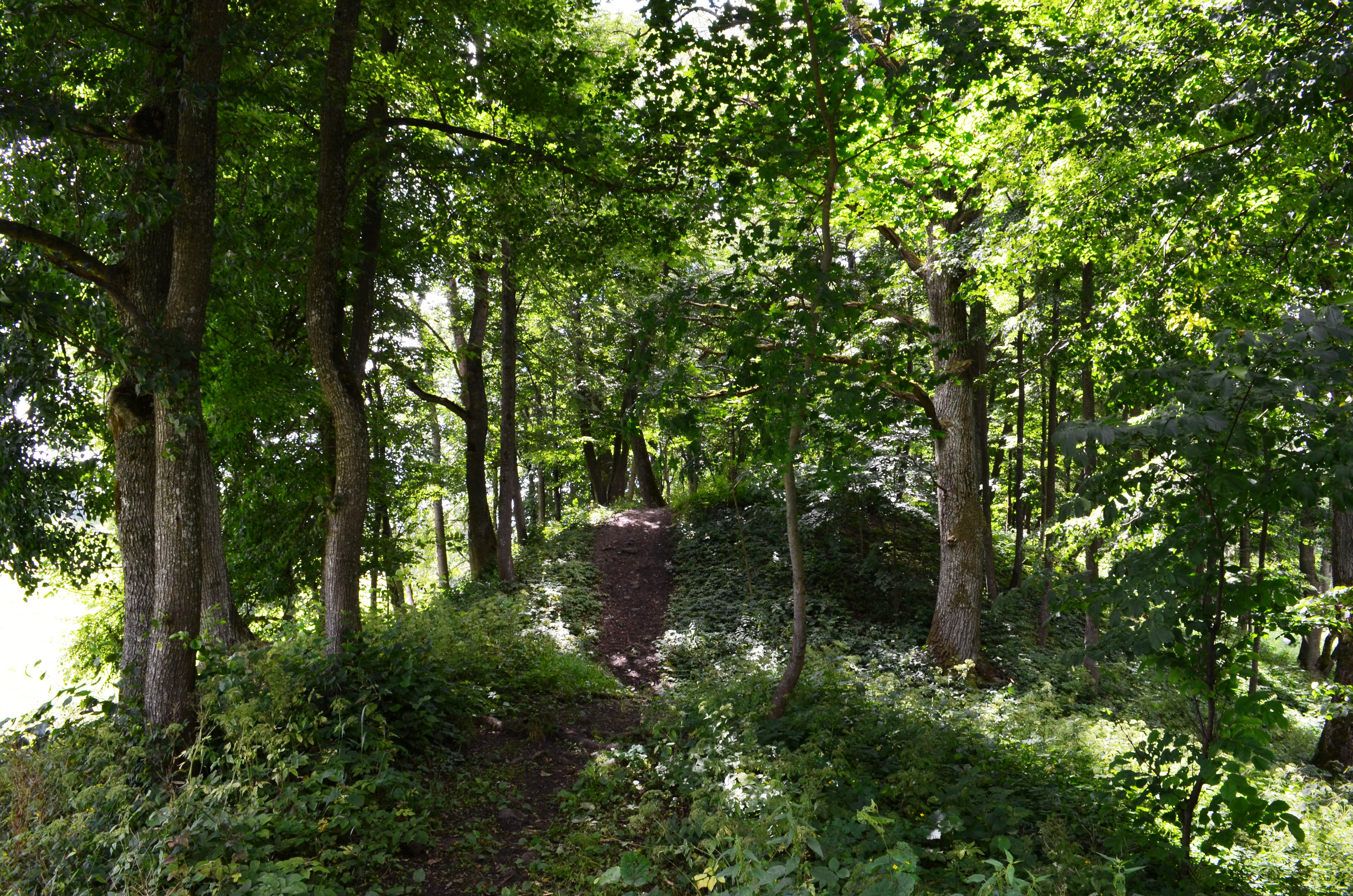
Čičinskas Hill in Upytė

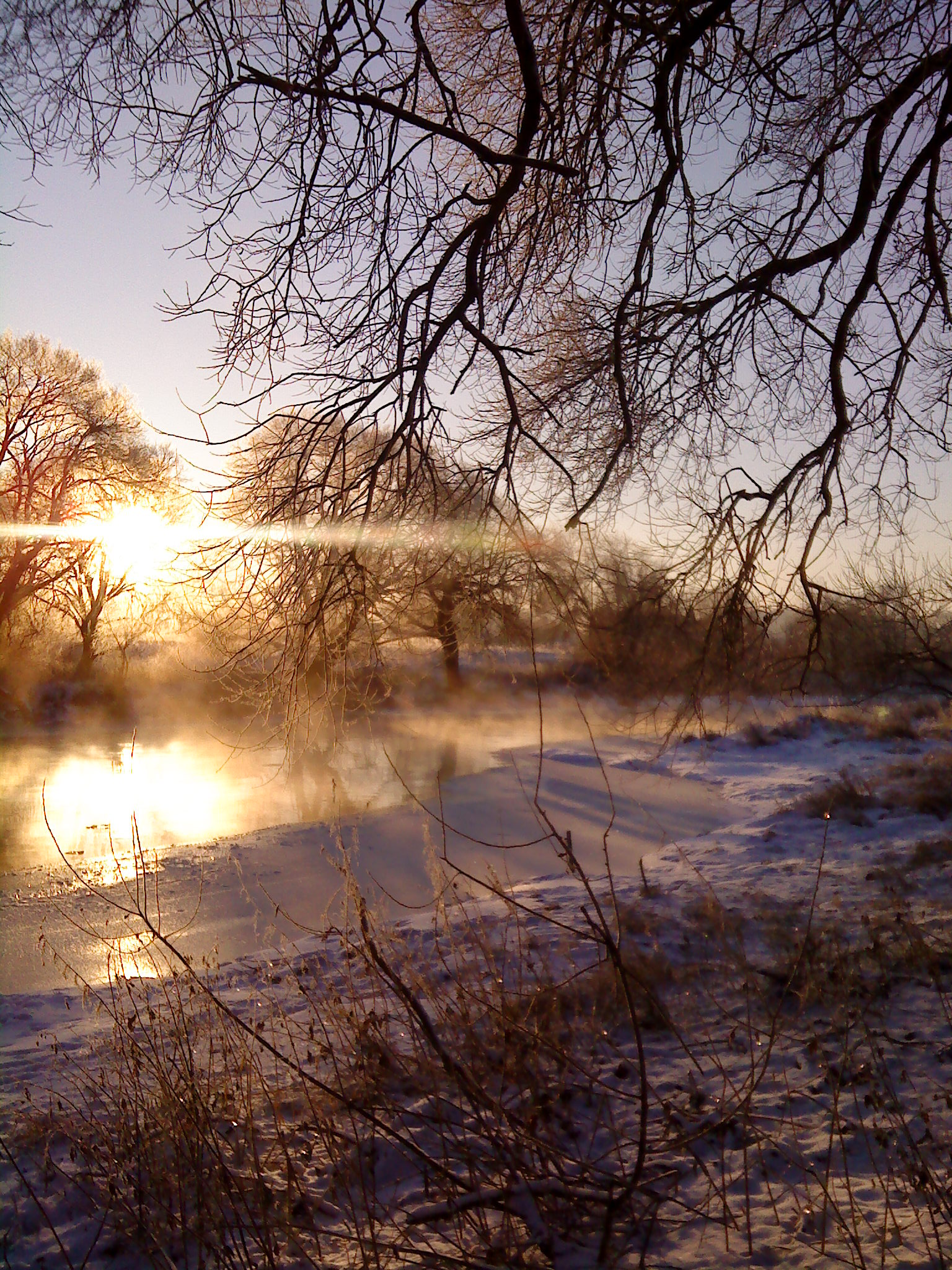
The Nevėžis in winter near Krekenava

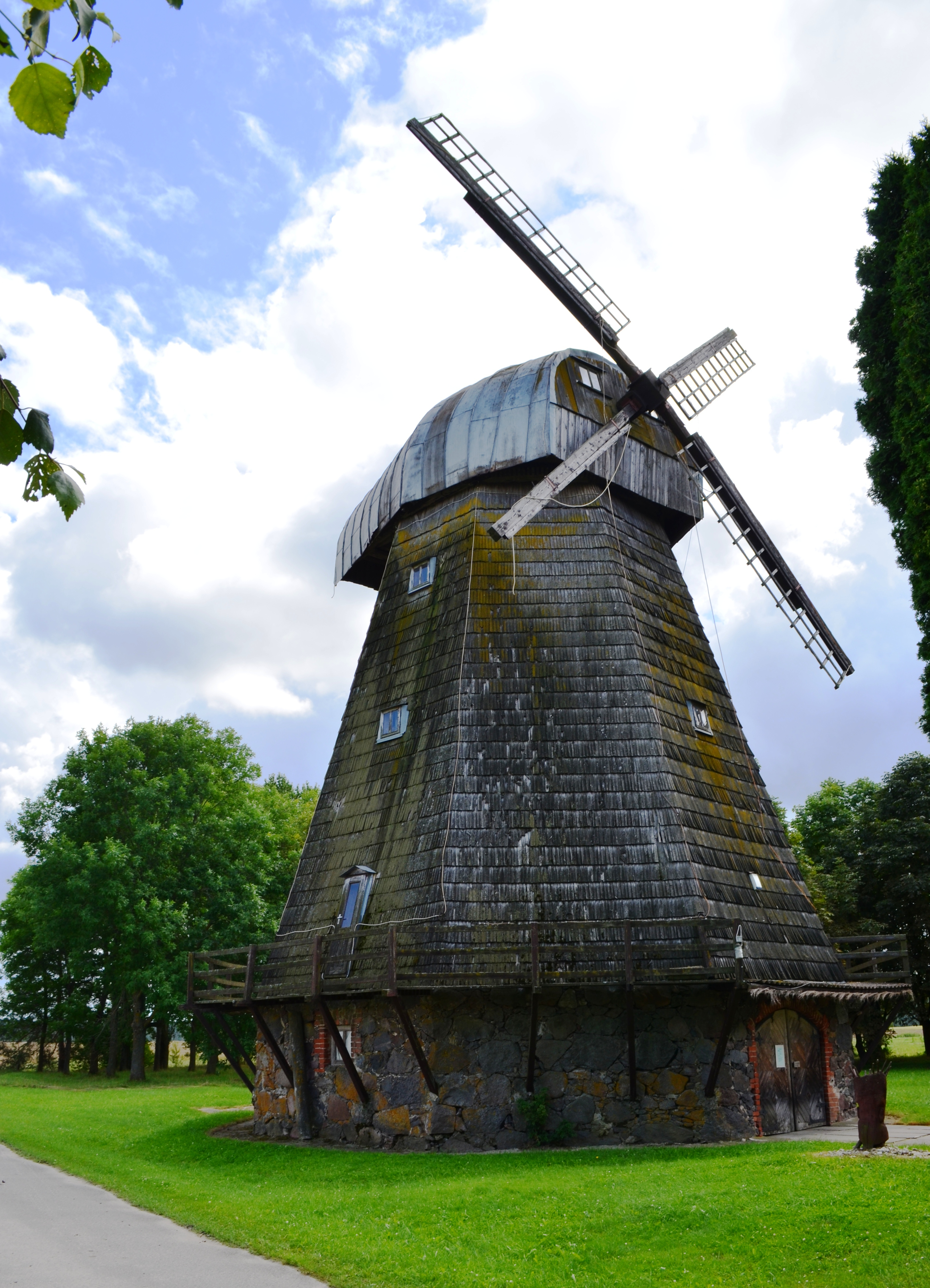
The Stultiškiai Windmill
