= Linkava =

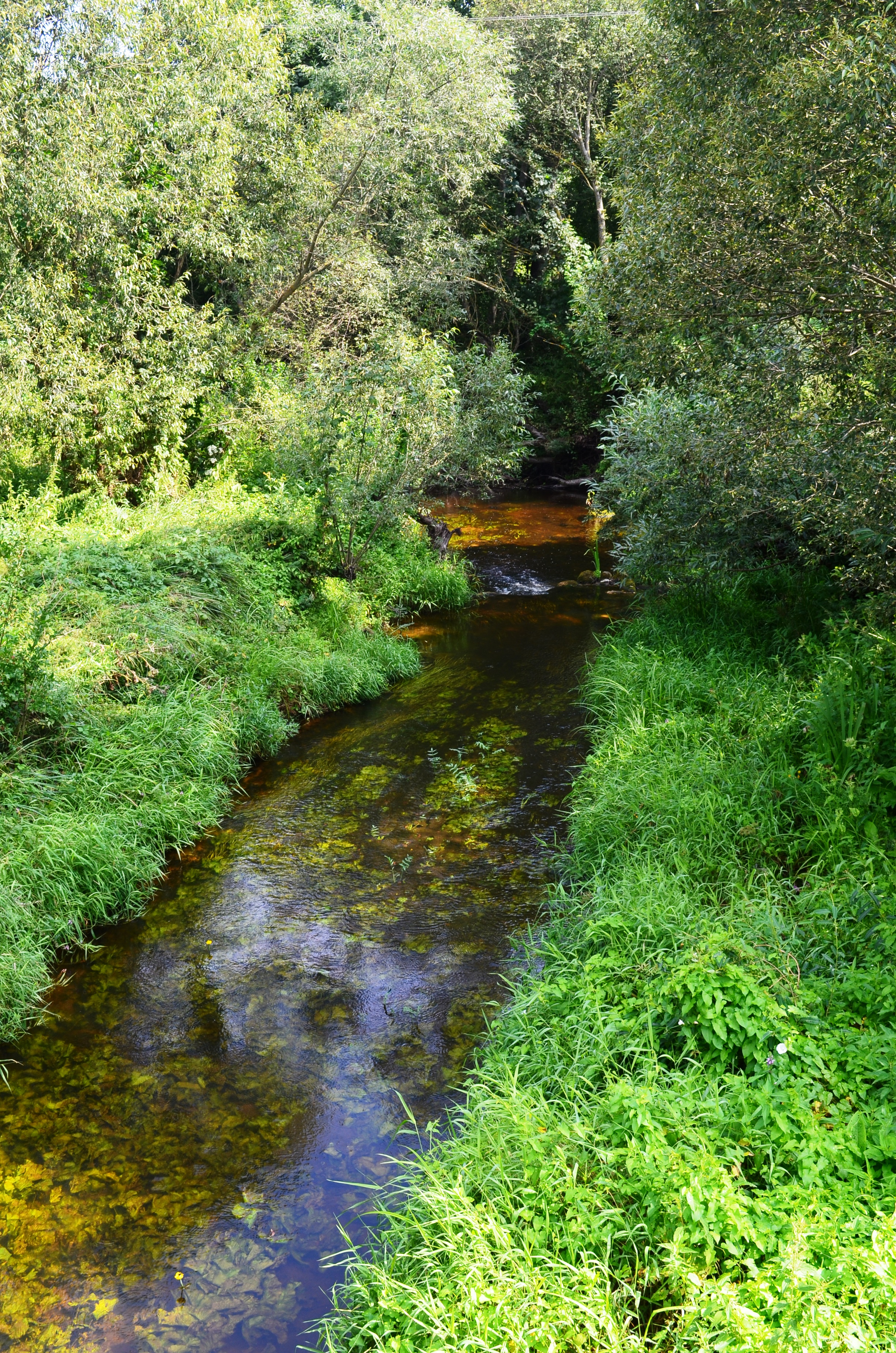
- Linkava in Rabikiai village

Location
- Country: Lithuania
- Region: Kėdainiai district municipality, Kaunas County

Physical characteristics
- Source
  - location: Near Ramygala
- Mouth: Nevėžis in Krekenava
  - coordinates: 55.5456°N 24.1038°E
- Length: 36.8 km (22.9 mi)
- Basin size: 163.4 km^{2} (63.1 sq mi)
- Discharge
  - average: 0.82 m³/s

Basin features
- Progression: Nevėžis→ Neman→ Baltic Sea
- Tributaries
  - left: Ratlankstis, Žiežmojus, Gilupis, Kreivė
  - right: Vermenė, Drūlupis, Tiltmedys, Sidzena, Josvainis

The Linkava is a river in Kėdainiai district municipality and Panevėžys district municipality, central Lithuania. It flows for 36.8 kilometres (22.9 mi) and has a basin area of 163.4 km^{2} (63.1 sq mi).

The Linkava starts 4 km from the town of Ramygala, near Vaidilai village. It flows to the southwest, later to the north west and meets the Nevėžis river (from the left side) in Krekenava. The bed width is 6-12, at some places 14–22 meters, the depth is 0.5–3 meters. The river course from Butrimoniai village has been left intact and now belongs to Krekenava Regional Park.

The name Linkava derives from the root *link- as in Lithuanian linka ('hollow, dip'), linkis ('curve, bay'), linkti ('to bend').
