= Panevėžys municipality =

Panevėžys municipality can refer to either of these two municipalities in Lithuania:

- Panevėžys
- Panevėžys District Municipality
