= Juostinas =

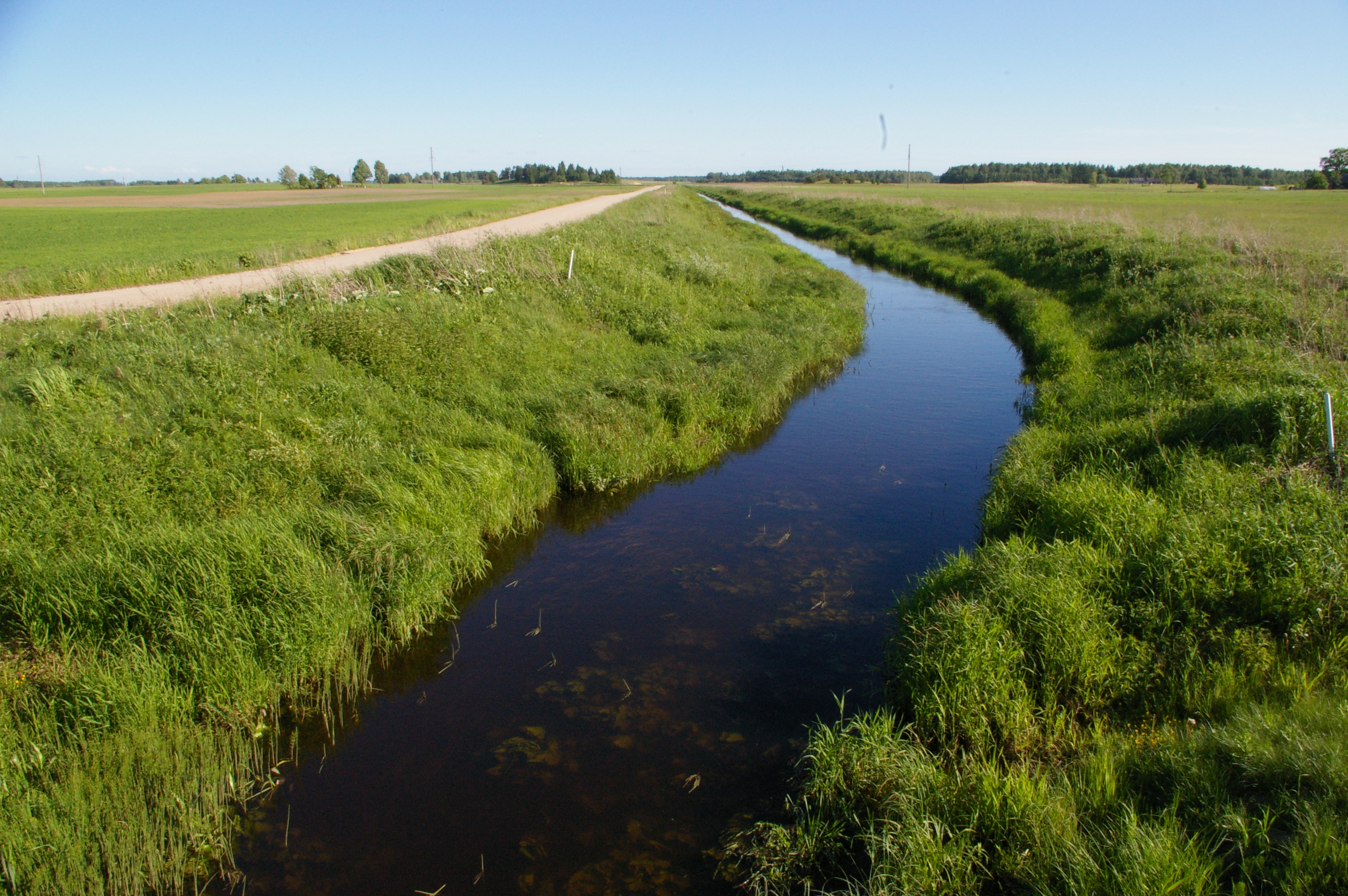

Location
- Country: Lithuania
- Region: Anykščiai district municipality, Utena County

Physical characteristics
- Mouth: Juosta
  - coordinates: 55.6593°N 24.6267°E

Basin features
- Progression: Juosta→ Nevėžis→ Neman→ Baltic Sea

The Juostinas is a river in Anykščiai district municipality, Utena County, northeastern Lithuania. It flows for 18.44 kilometres (11.46 mi).

It is a tributary of the Juosta.
