= Miežiškiai Eldership =

Eldership of Lithuania

The Miežiškiai Eldership (Lithuanian: Miežiškių seniūnija) is an eldership of Lithuania, located in the Panevėžys District Municipality. In 2021 its population was 2,008.
