= Panevėžys urban area =

Panevėžys urban area Panevėžio aglomeracija
- Urban area
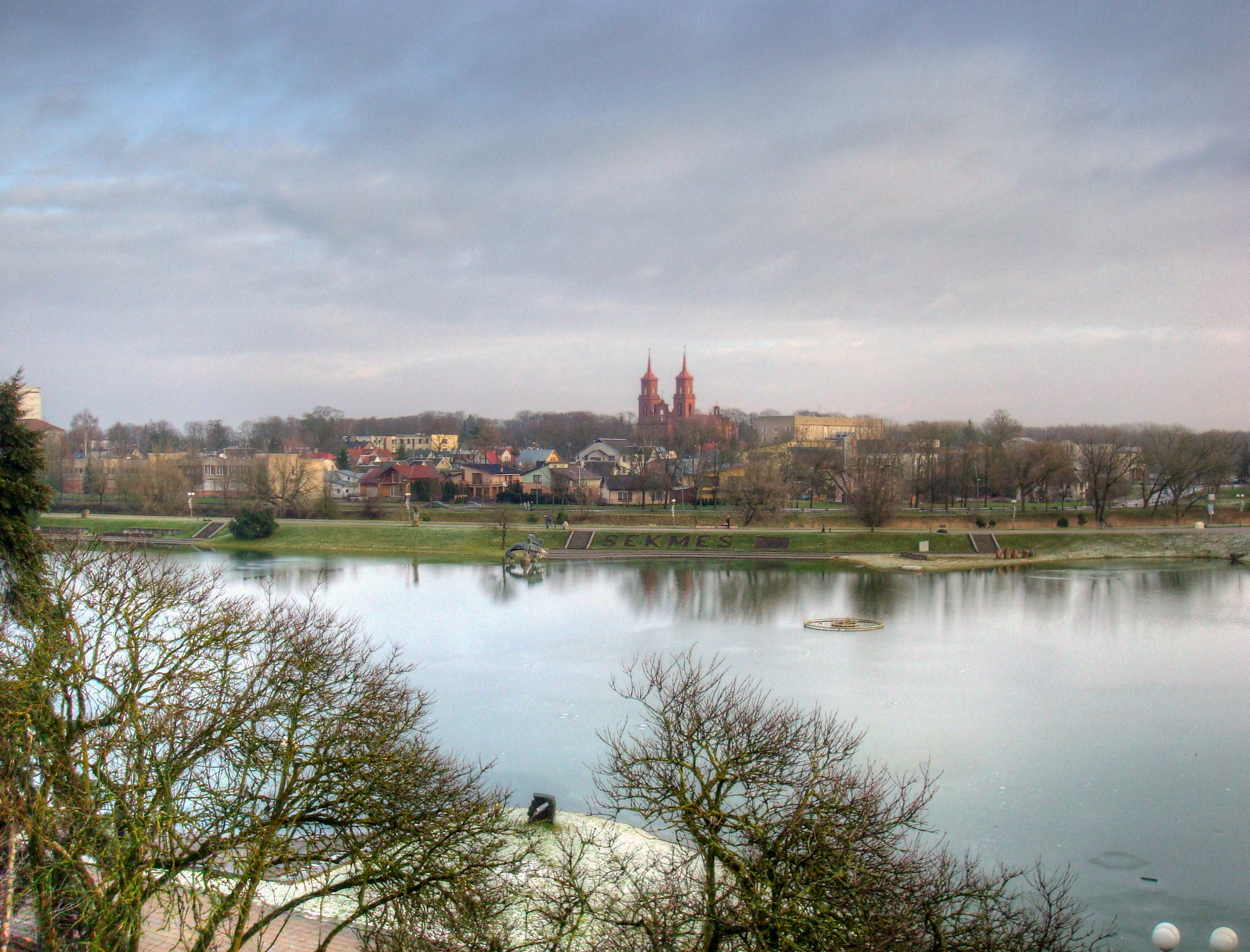
- Skyline of Panevėžys

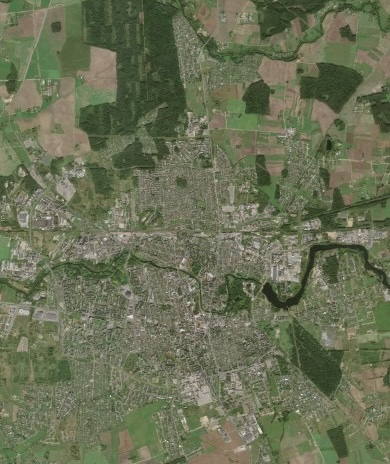
- Panevėžys urban sprawl from space, ESA
- Coordinates: 55°39′N 24°21′E
- Country: Lithuania
- Largest city: Panevėžys

Area
  - Urban: 60 km^{2} (23 sq mi)

Population
  - Urban: 122,966
  - Urban density: 2,000/km^{2} (5,200/sq mi)
- Time zone: UTC+2 (EET)

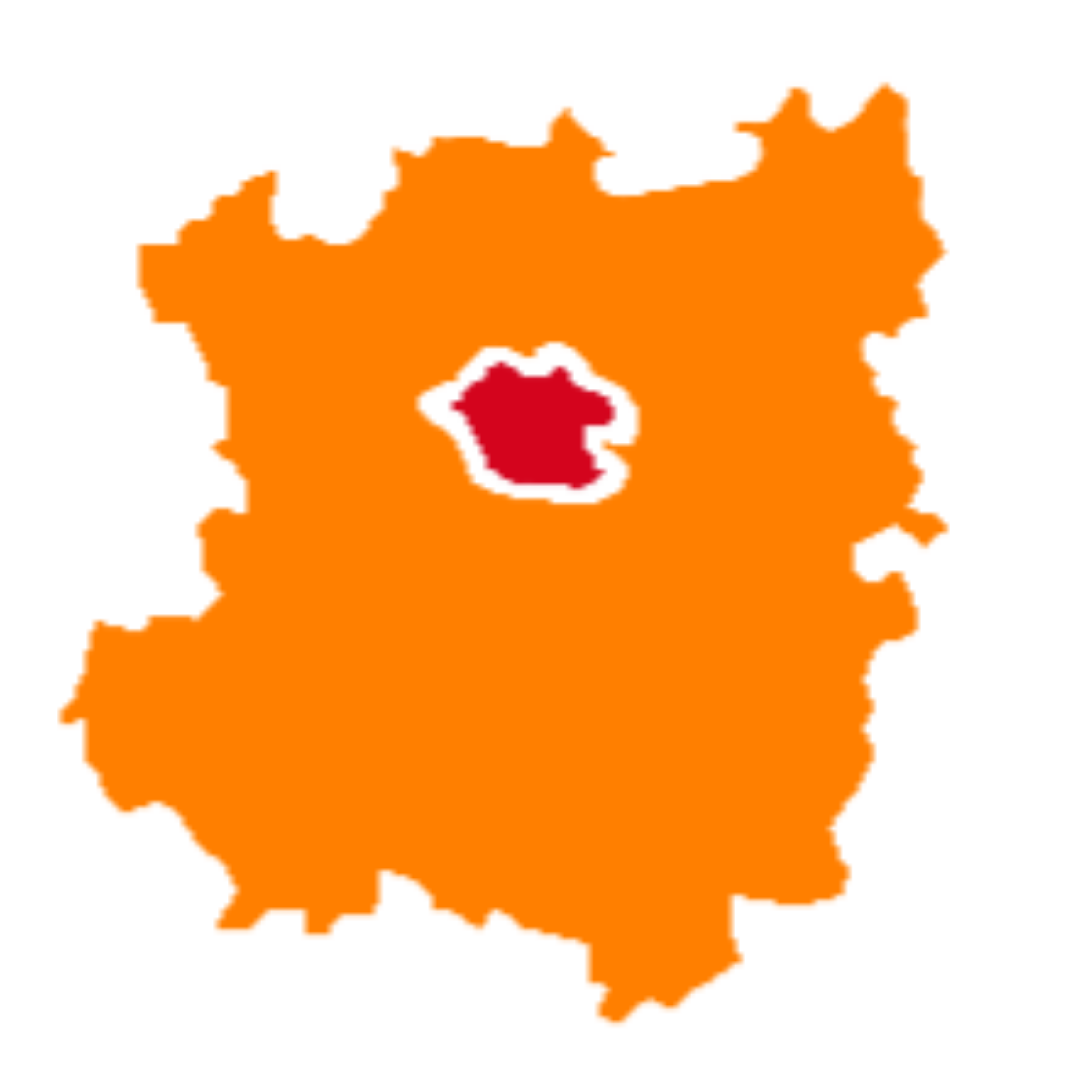
Panevėžys City (red) and District (orange) Municipalities

The Panevėžys urban area (known in Lithuanian as: Panevėžio aglomeracija) is the urban area of Panevėžys. The urban area covers two municipalities in the Panevėžys County, with an area of 60 km^{2}

== Demographics ==
The largest cities or towns within the urban area are Panevėžys, Dembava (3 thousand inhabitants), Velžys, Vaivadai, Šilagalys, Staniūnai, Molainiai and Piniava – between 600 and 1500 inhabitants each, Berčiūnai and some other localities.

Subdivision	Area km^{2}	Population
Panevėžys	50	85,774
Panevėžys District Municipality	2179	35,390

== Economy ==
In 2022 Panevėžys gross metropolitan product was around €3 billion.

== See also ==
- List of EU metropolitan areas by GDP
