= Smilgiai Eldership =

Eldership of Lithuania

The Smilgiai Eldership (Lithuanian: Smilgių seniūnija) is an eldership of Lithuania, located in the Panevėžys District Municipality. In 2021 its population was 1423.
