= Juosta =

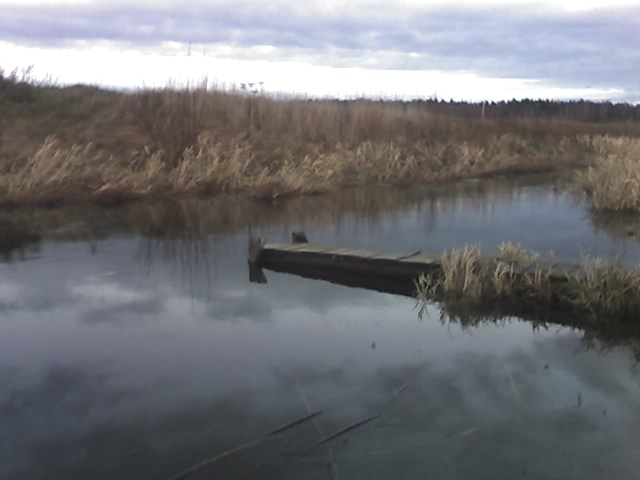
- The Juosta near Jacgalys village

Location
- Country: Lithuania

Physical characteristics
- Source
  - location: Anykščiai district municipality, Utena County
- Mouth: Nevėžis
  - coordinates: 55.7352°N 24.4290°E
- Length: 50.8 km (31.6 mi)
- Basin size: 273.3 km^{2} (105.5 sq mi)
- Discharge
  - average: 0.82 m^{3}/s (29 cu ft/s)

Basin features
- Progression: Nevėžis→ Neman→ Baltic Sea
- Tributaries
  - left: Užlužupys, Juostinas
  - right: Jūrupis, Rekstinas, Venys, Akmena

The Juosta is a river of Anykščiai district municipality, Utena County and Panevėžys district municipality, Panevėžys County, northeastern Lithuania. It flows for 50.8 kilometres and has a basin area of 273.3 km².

It is a right-bank tributary of the Nevėžis.
