= Paįstrys Eldership =

Eldership of Lithuania

The Paįstrys Eldership (Lithuanian: Paįstrio seniūnija) is an eldership of Lithuania, located in the Panevėžys District Municipality. In 2021 its population was 2388.
