= Ramygala =

- Town
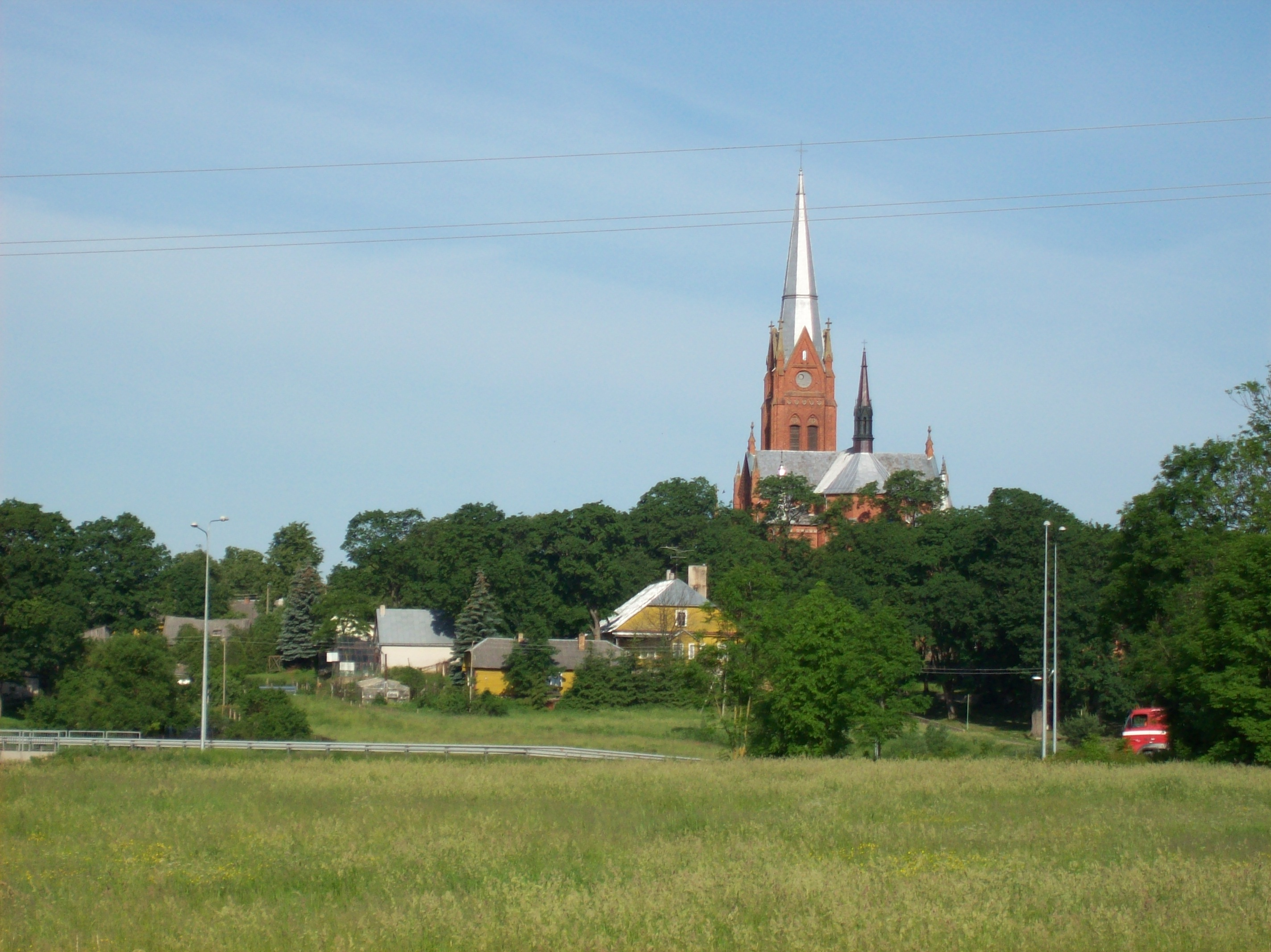
- Panorama of Ramygala

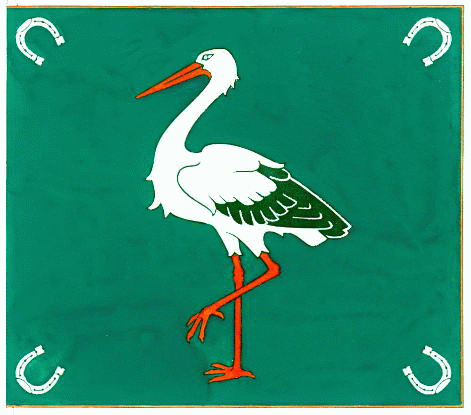
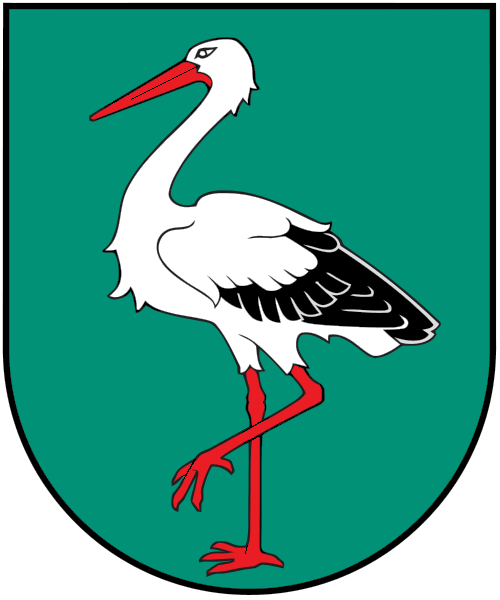
- Flag Seal

- Location of Ramygala
- Coordinates: 55°30′40″N 24°18′10″E
- Country: Lithuania
- Ethnographic region: Aukštaitija
- County: Panevėžys County
- Municipality: Panevėžys district municipality
- Eldership: Ramygala eldership
- Capital of: Ramygala eldership
- First mentioned: 1503

Population (2022)
  - Total: 1,232
- Time zone: UTC+2 (EET)
  - Summer (DST): UTC+3 (EEST)

Ramygala (literally "quiet end") is a town in Lithuania. It is located some 24 km (15 mi) south from Panevėžys on the banks of the Upytė River, a tributary to the Nevėžis River. According to 2017 estimate, it had 1,440 residents.

== Etymology ==
The name Ramygala probably originally meant "quiet end, quiet place", since its name consists of two syllables: ram- (from ramus - "quiet, noiseless, cozy") and -gala ("edge, region, area") . A less likely version is that the place name comes from the personal name Ramys (e.g. like Vytogala or Ariogala), but such a personal name does not exist anymore.

== History ==
Ramygala was the location of one of many Roman Catholic churches where the priests had to know the Lithuanian language according to the Grand Duke of Lithuania Alexander Jagiellon in 1501

The name of Ramygala has been mentioned in historical sources since the 13th century as Remigale. In 1370, the place suffered from the Teutonic Knight attack. Before 1492 (according to other sources, 1431-1500), the first church in Ramygala was built. The town itself was mentioned in 1503. The county of Ramygala is mentioned in 1525, while the Ramygala Manor is mentioned in 1540, and at the end of the 16th century the town received a privilege to host fairs.

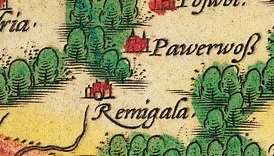
Ramygala, marked in a 1573 map

Unlike many other towns in Lithuania, Ramygala did not belong to a noble family but rather to Vilnius Cathedral and later to Vilnius University.Ramygala was located in the crossroads leading to Kėdainiai, Raguva, Šeduva, Panevėžys, and Ukmergė. The town and its surroundings have long been famous for goats and goat markets were held here.

A pharmacy was opened in Ramygala in 1888 and a post office in 1895.

During the Lithuanian anti-Soviet guerilla war, the Lithuanian partisans of the Vytis military district's Krikštaponis territorial unit operated in the vicinity.

On 28 December 1956, Ramygala was granted city rights. Before the Soviet reclamation, Ramygala was surrounded by Liūnai, Pikšra, Uslaja and Žarčiai swamps and peat bogs. During the Soviet occupation, Ramygala was the central settlement of a kolkhoz.

In 2010, Ramygala was declared the cultural capital of Lithuania. A goat beauty contest took place here.

=== School ===
In 1781 the town established a parish school next to a new church after the old one was destroyed by fire. The school grew and expanded significantly in the 20th century. It built two new school buildings and a dorm. In 2005 it was named Ramygala Gymnasium. The school hosts a small museum dedicated to the local history and traditions.

=== Church ===
A new Neo Gothic church was built in 1897–1914. It has 3 aisles and 3 altars. It features only one bell tower. The tower was damaged during World War II, but was rebuilt in the 1950s.

== Administration ==
Since the second half of the 18th century, Ramygala was administrative center of a valsčius. After the administrative reform by the Soviet authorities in 1950, the town became a capital of a raion (Lithuanian: rajonas). In 1962 Ramygala lost the status of the capital of a raion. Now it is a center of an eldership, the smallest administrative division in Lithuania. It has a small hospital and a library.

== Famous people ==
- The Venerable Mother Maria Kaupas (1880-1940), nun and founder of the Sisters of Saint Casimir
- Mykolas Vrubliauskas (1919–1998), ceramics artist
- Saulius Mykolaitis (1966–2006), actor
