= Krekenava =

- Town
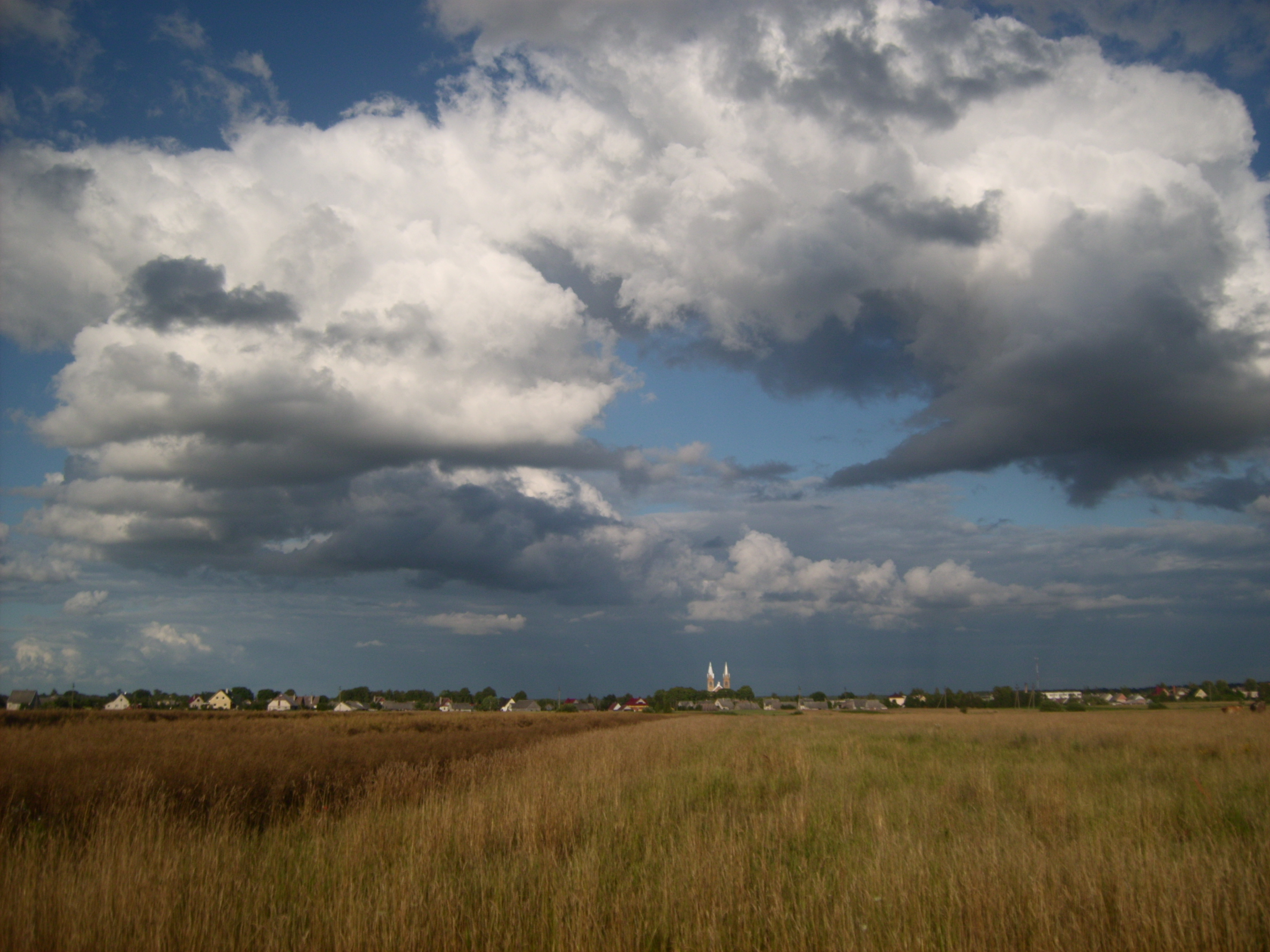
- Krekenava panorama

- Flag Coat of arms

- Location of Krekenava in Lithuania Krekenava (Baltic states) Krekenava (Europe)
- Coordinates: 55°32′28″N 24°05′31″E
- Country: Lithuania
- Ethnographic region: Aukštaitija
- County: Panevėžys County

Population (2021)
  - Total: 1,375
- Time zone: UTC+2 (EET)
  - Summer (DST): UTC+3 (EEST)
- Website: http://www.krekenava.lt

Krekenava is a town (population 1,375) in Panevėžys district municipality in northern Lithuania, on the bank of Nevėžis.

== Etymology ==
In the past, the town's place name had a different root than it does now: krakin- or krokin-. In the old days, the town was mostly called Krakinava, a name still used in the early 20th century. The new form Krekenava was referred to by Vaižgantas as early as 1904, and it was included in the official publication "Places Settled in Lithuania" of 1925. The town's name in other languages: Polish: Krakinów; Yiddish: קראַקינאָווע, romanized: Krakinove.

== History ==
From 1409 it was the center of Upytė poviat, the first wooden church built by Vytautas the Great in 1419. Nearby Krekanava is the birthplace of the painter Romanas Alekna Švoinickis (1845–1915).

In July and August 1941, an Einsatzgruppen of Lithuanian nationalists massacred the Jewish residents of the town, about 50 grownups and 60 children. Along with Jews they also shot so-called Communists and Soviet activists, in all about 190 people. The massacre took place in a ditch between the old and new cemeteries.

== Economy ==
1975 is a year of the beginning of JSC “Krekenavos Agrofirma” activities, a company which employs over 900 people. “Krekenavos agrofirma” allocates its investments to the two priority fields – improvement of the quality of its activities, and production expansion.

== Gallery ==
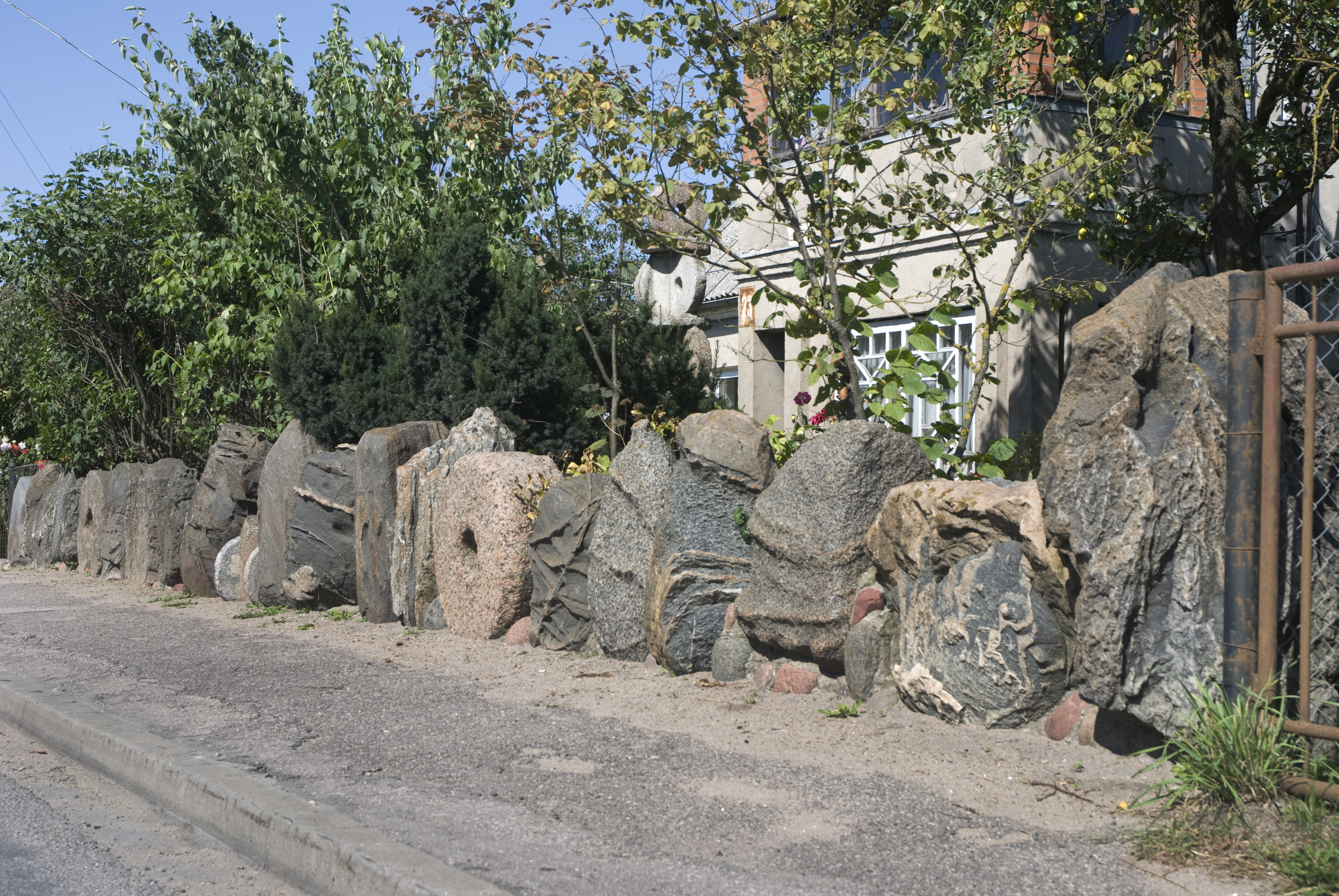
Stone wall near a house

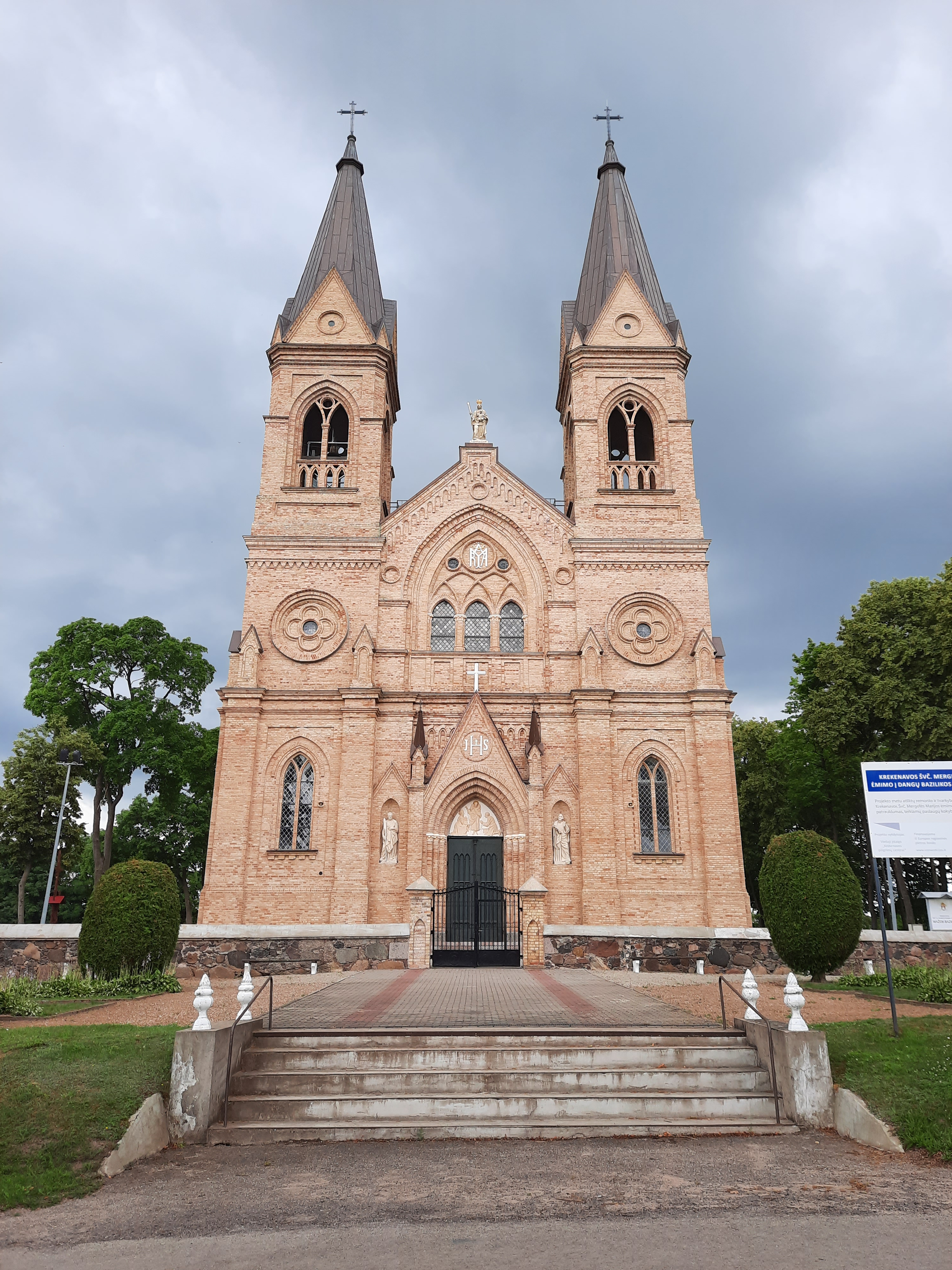
Church

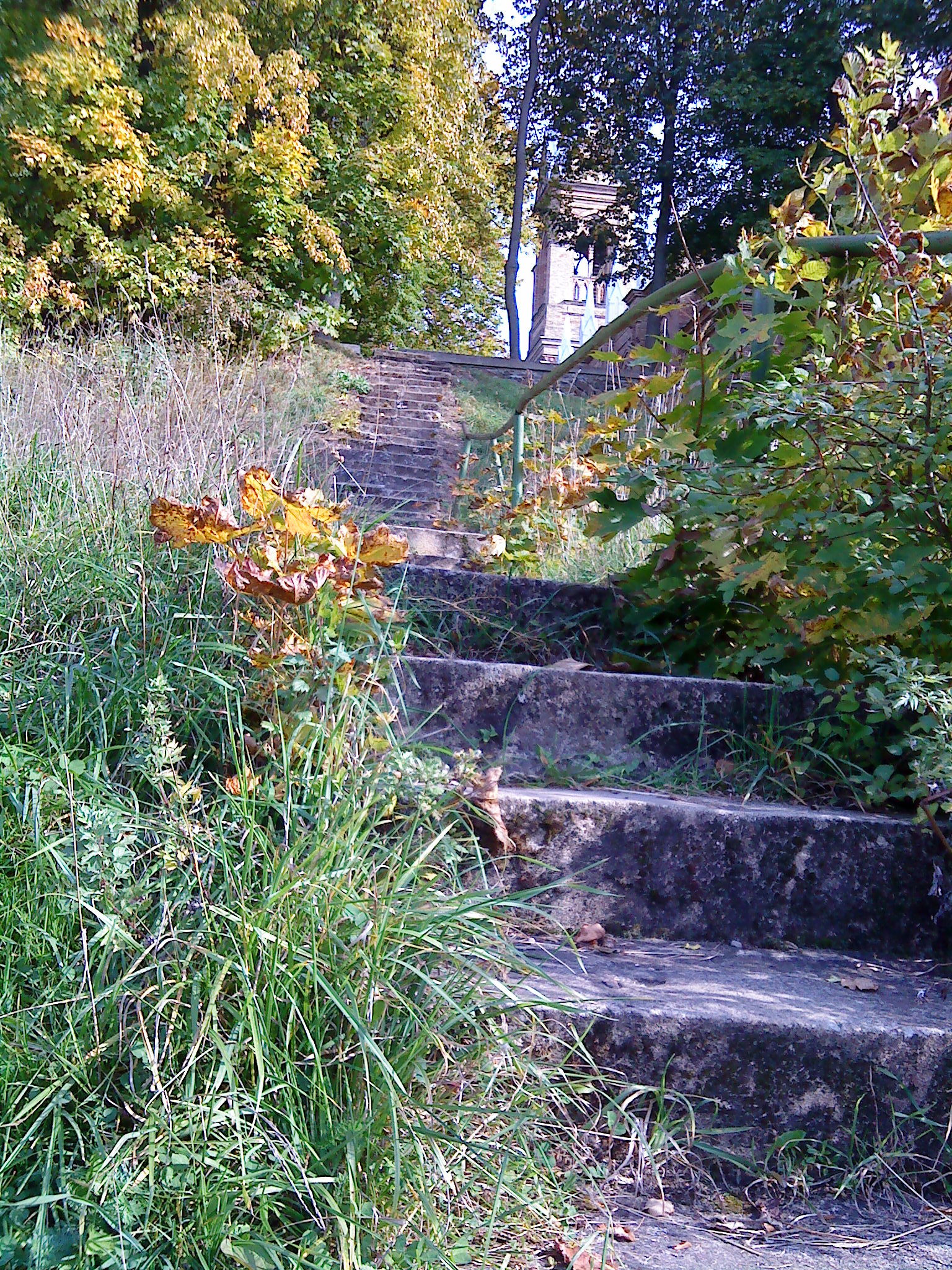
Stairs to the church

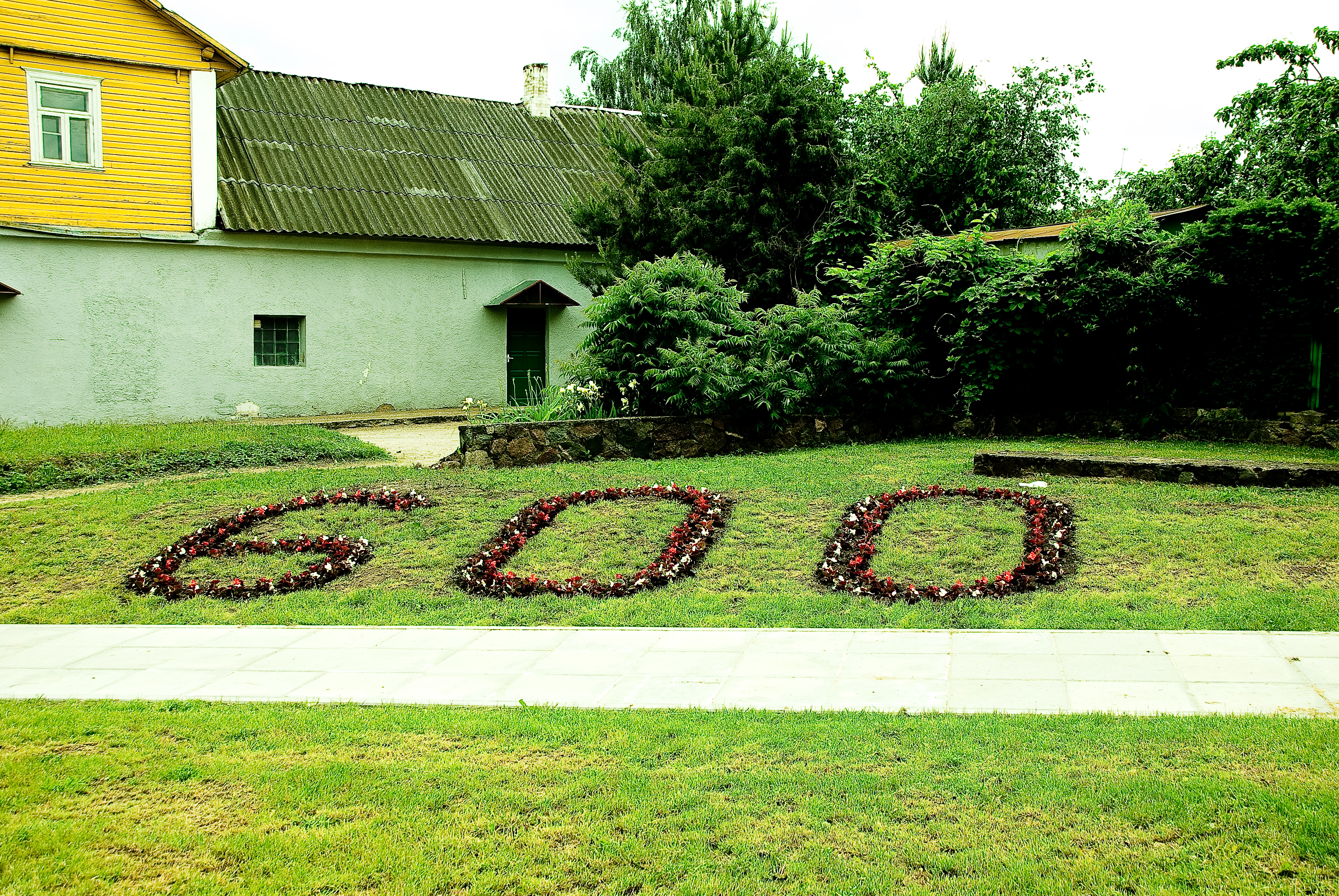
Krekenava 600 year jubilee

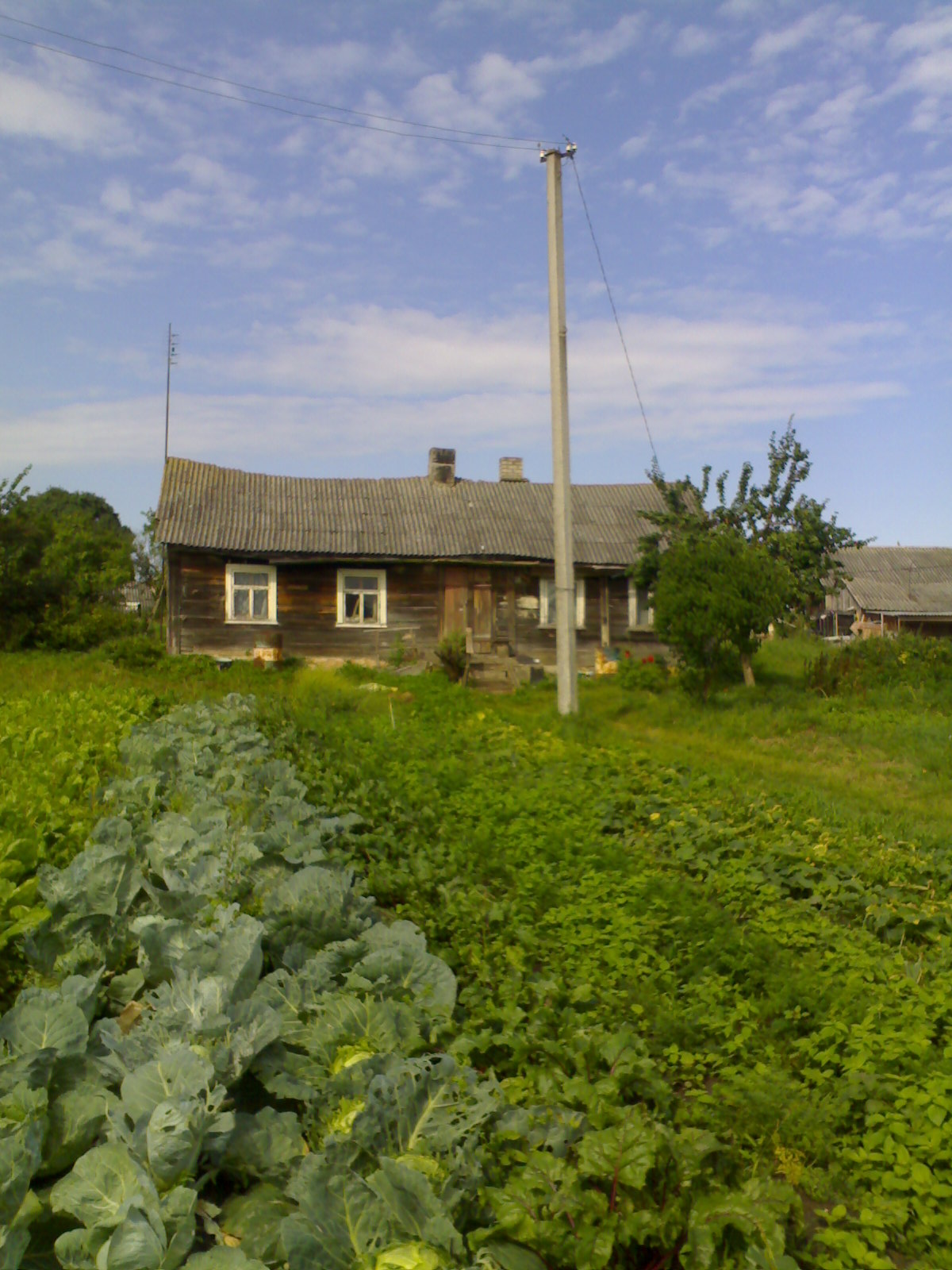
Old house in Sodų st.

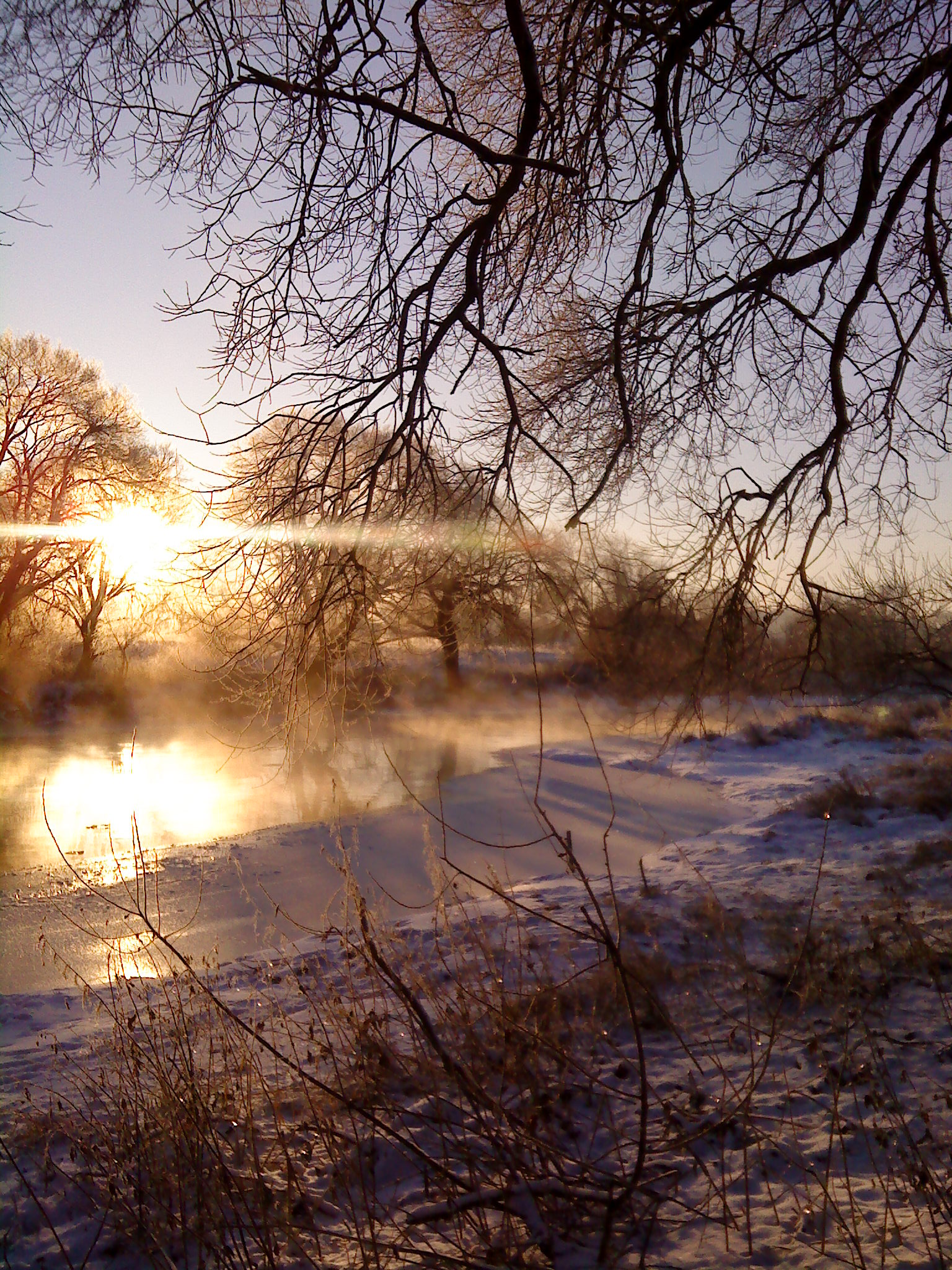
Nevėžis (river) in winter

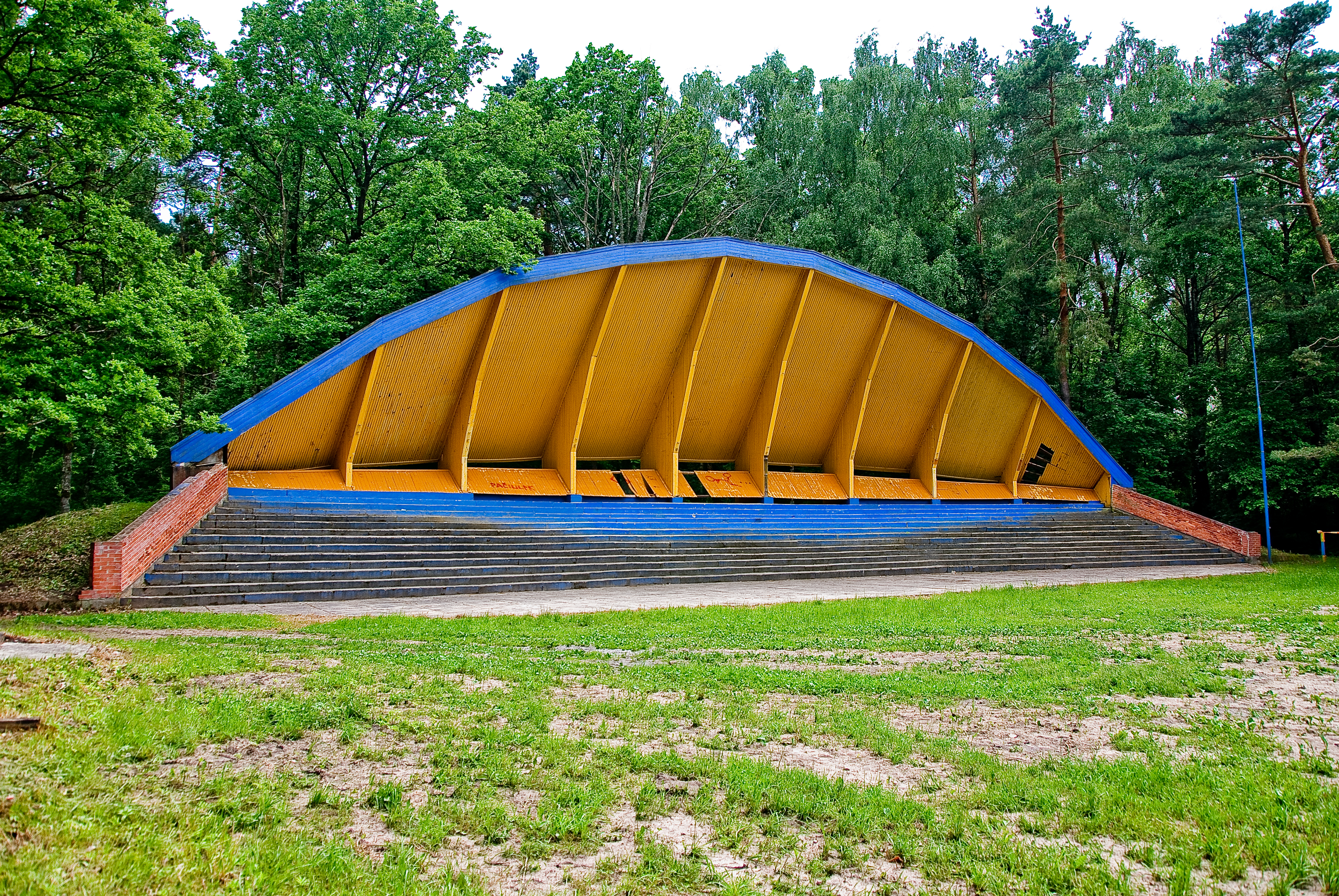
Stage in the pine forest

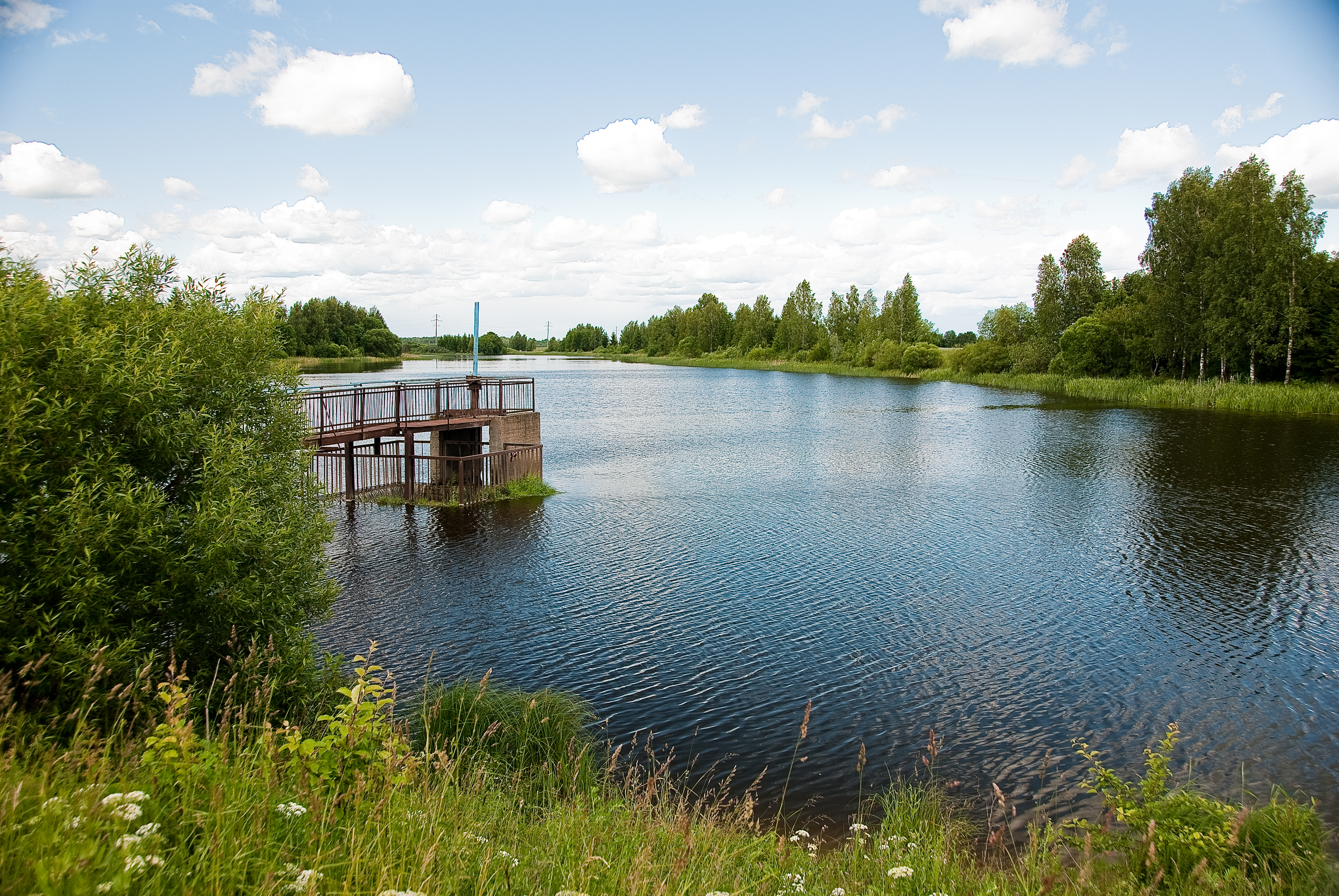
Dam

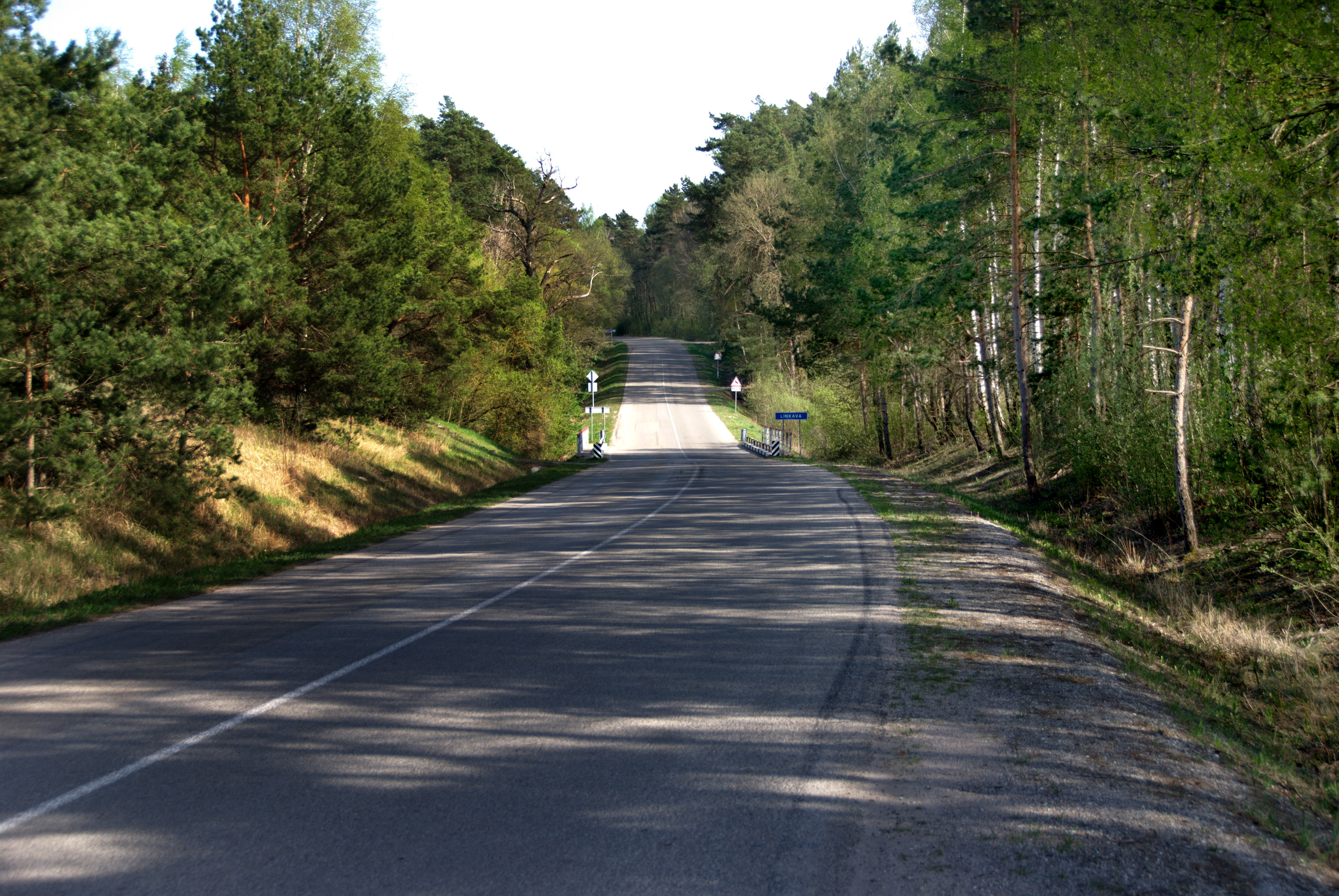
Road to Varnakalnis

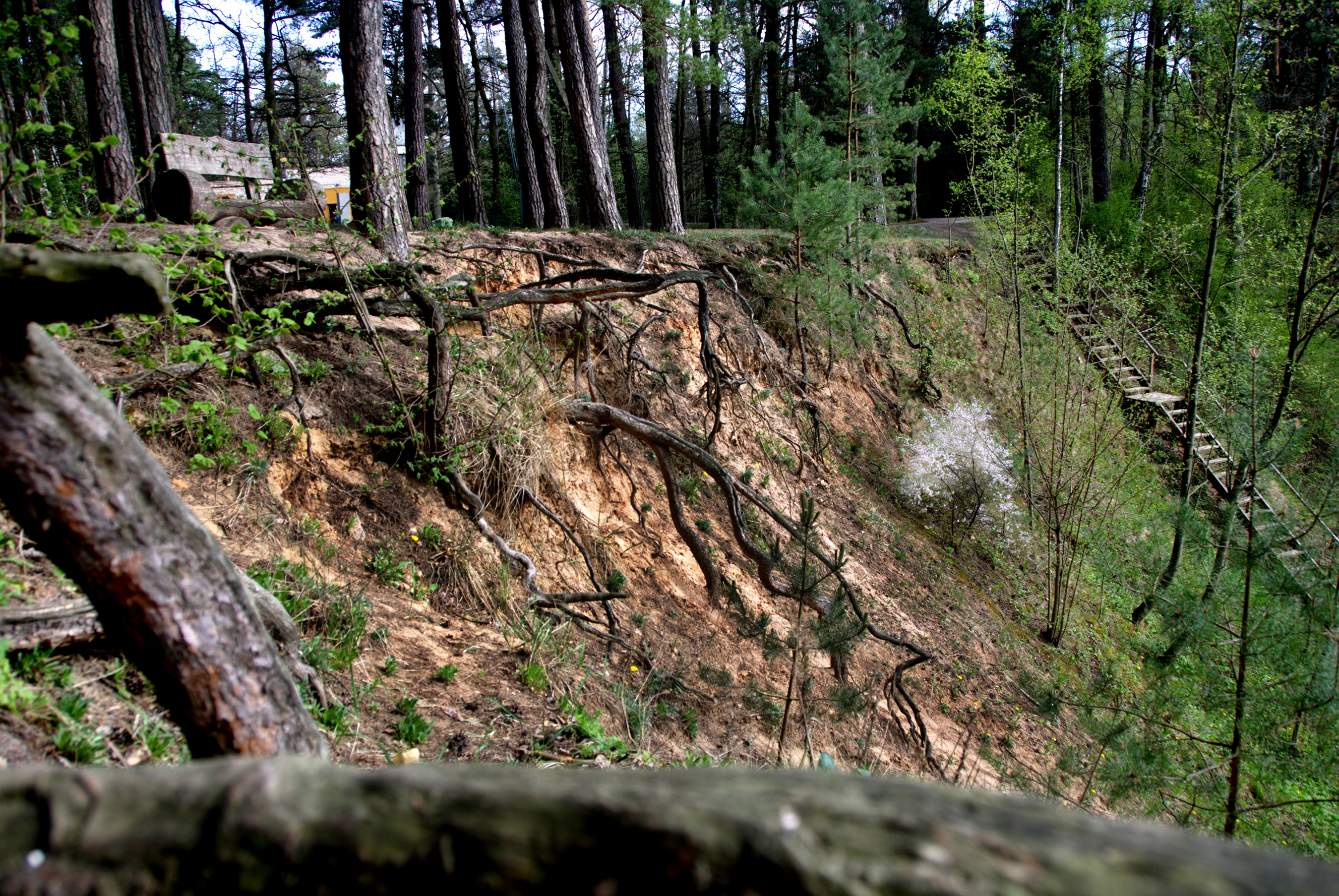
Scarp in Varnakalnis

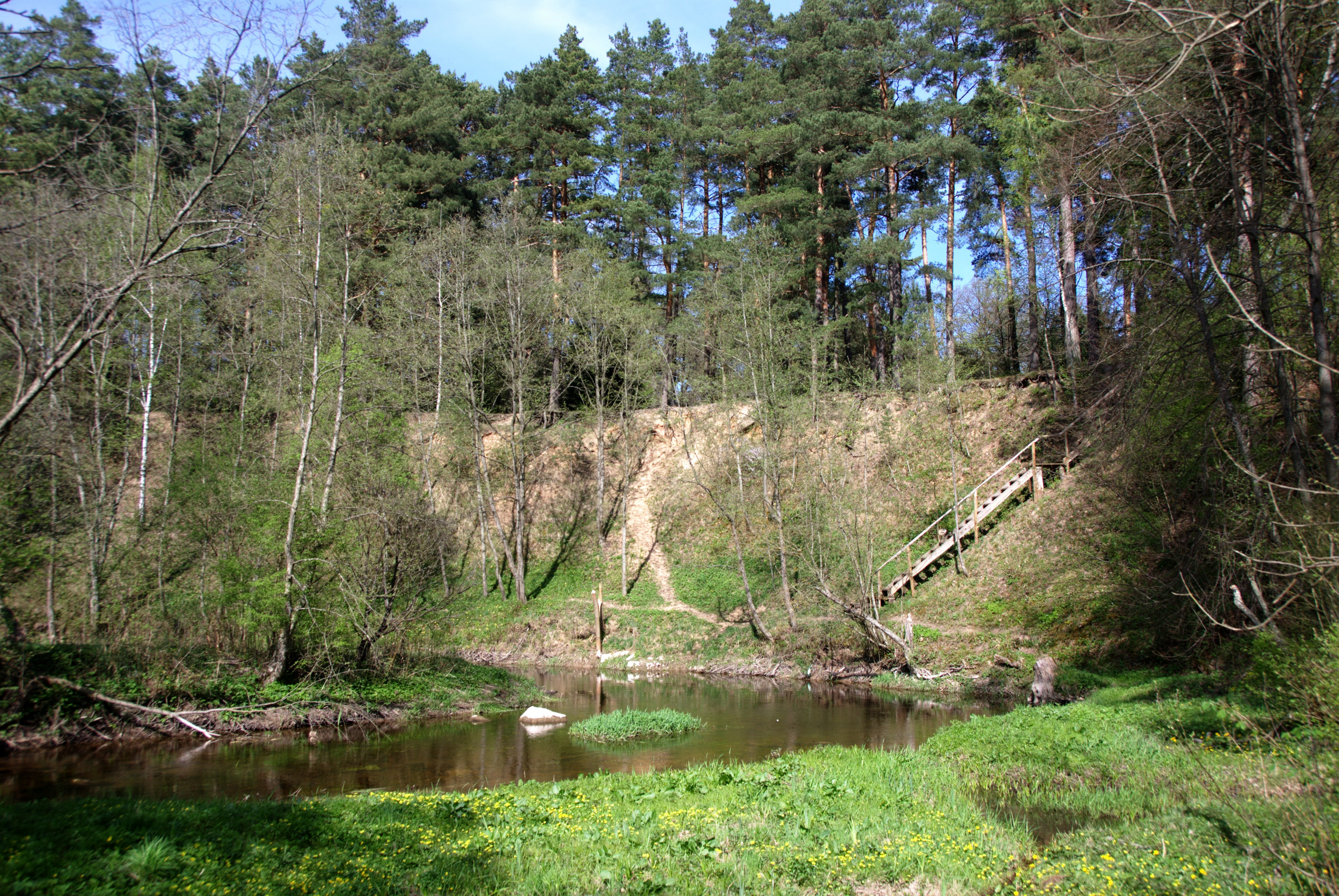
Varnakalnis

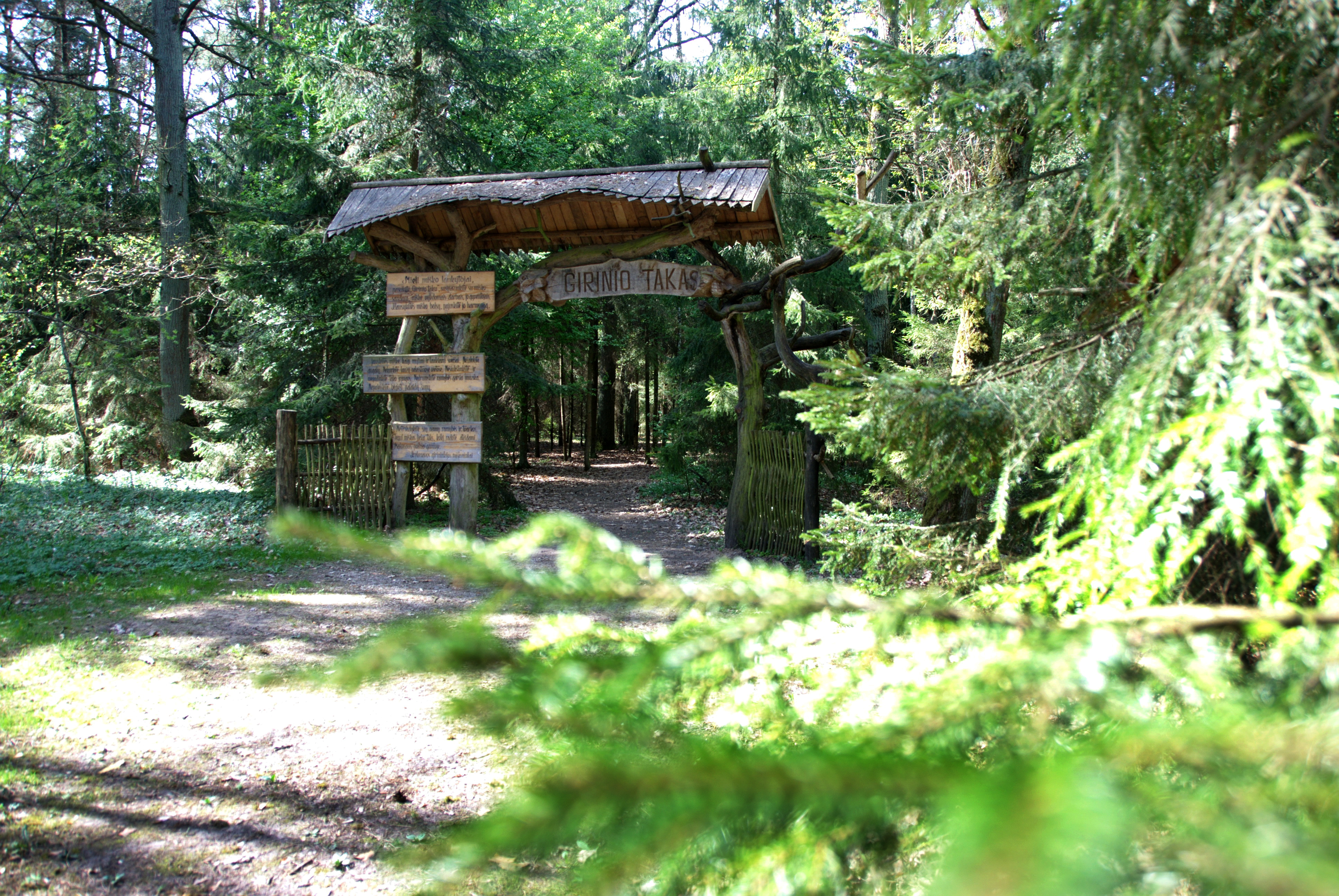
"Girinio" road
