= Nevėžis =

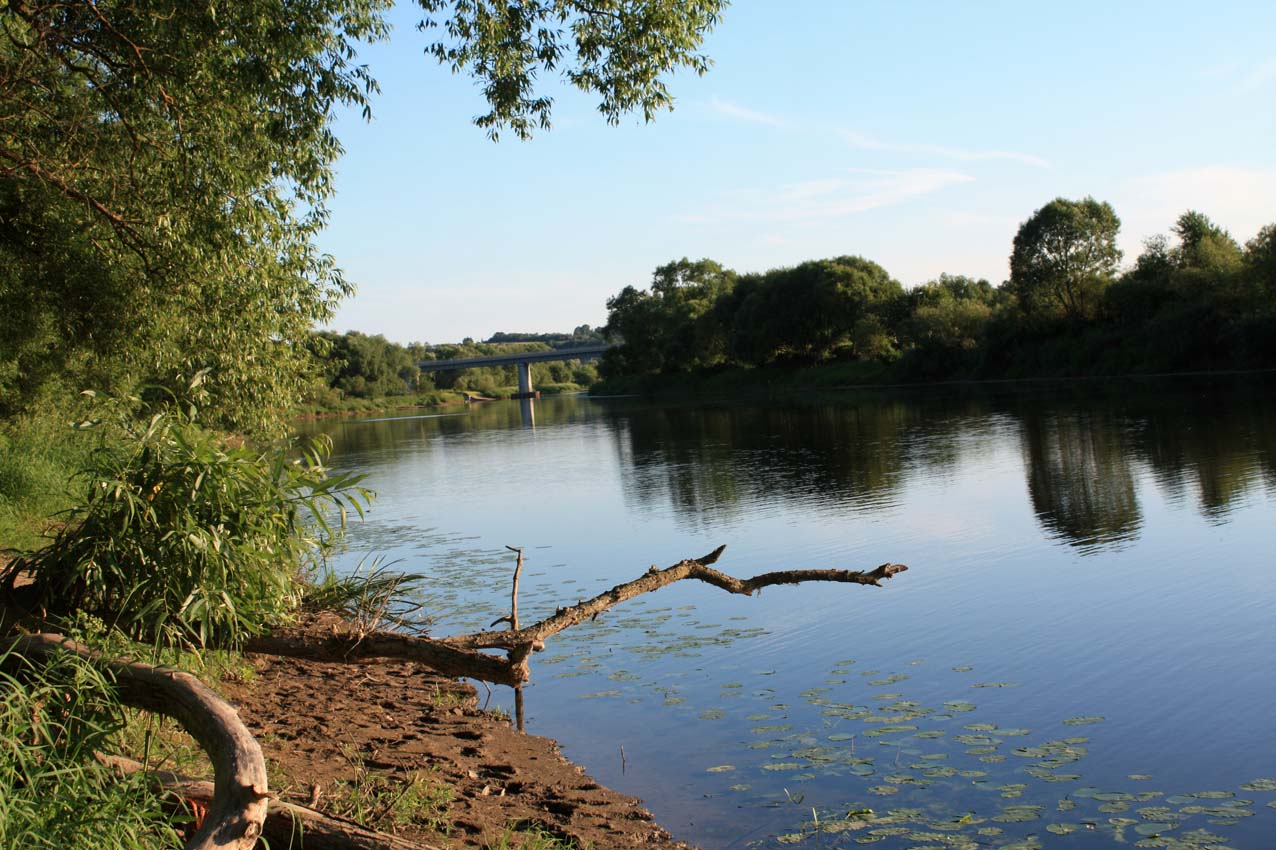
- Nevėžis lower course in Kaunas District Municipality

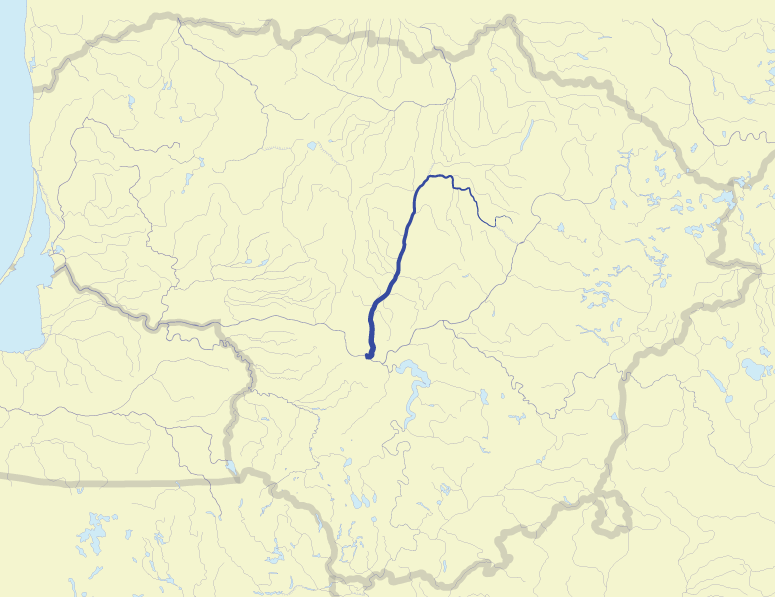
- Map of Nevėžis

Location
- Country: Lithuania

Physical characteristics
- Source
  - location: Paraisčiai Mire, Anykščiai District Municipality
- Mouth: Neman in Raudondvaris
  - coordinates: 54.9319°N 23.7546°E
- Length: 209 km (130 mi)
- Basin size: 6,140 km^{2} (2,370 sq mi)
- Discharge
  - average: 33.2 m^{3}/s (1,170 cu ft/s)

Basin features
- Progression: Neman→ Baltic Sea
- Tributaries
  - left: Alanta, Juoda, Upytė, Linkava, Obelis, Barupė, Gynia
  - right: Juosta, Kiršinas, Liaudė, Kruostas, Dotnuvėlė, Smilga, Šušvė, Aluona, Strūna

The Nevėžis (/nɪˈvɛʒɪs, nɛ-/; Lithuanian: [nʲɛˈvʲěːʑɪs]) is the sixth longest river in Lithuania and one of the main tributaries of the Nemunas. The 209 km (130 mi) long Nevėžis flows entirely within Lithuania. Among the rivers that flow exclusively within Lithuania's borders, the Nevėžis is the second longest, after the Šventoji. Its source is in the Anykščiai District Municipality. The river first flows in a northwesterly direction, but at Panevėžys it turns southwest, and passing Kėdainiai, flows into the Neman just west of Kaunas near Raudondvaris.

== Name ==
There is a popular misconception that the name Nevėžis means 'a river without crayfish' because vėžys is the Lithuanian word for crayfish and ne means 'no'. In fact, the Nevėžis is known for its variety of fauna which include crayfish. Other ethimology suggested from Proto-Baltic *nevēźā- (ex. Lithuainian ne-vežti 'not to carry') and means 'slow, not-conveying river'. The Soviet-Belarusian geographer Vadim Zhuchkevich suggested that the name Nevėžis could be derived from a Finnish word nevo meaning 'swamp'. The upper river has swampy banks.

The name also relate by N phoneme to the rivers Neris and Nemunas that takes flow of the other two.

The river gave name to many things including Panevėžys, the fifth-largest city in Lithuania. Its name translates to '[Town] near Nevėžis'. FK Nevėžis and KK Nevėžis are also named after the river. The Nevėžis is important in Lithuanian culture because it flows through the middle of Lithuania. During the Middle Ages, the river was considered to be a natural border between two regions of Lithuania: Samogitia and Aukštaitija.

=== Other forms ===
Commonly it is also known in its shorter form as Nevkė or Nefkė, in Kėdainiai town.

== Natural environment ==
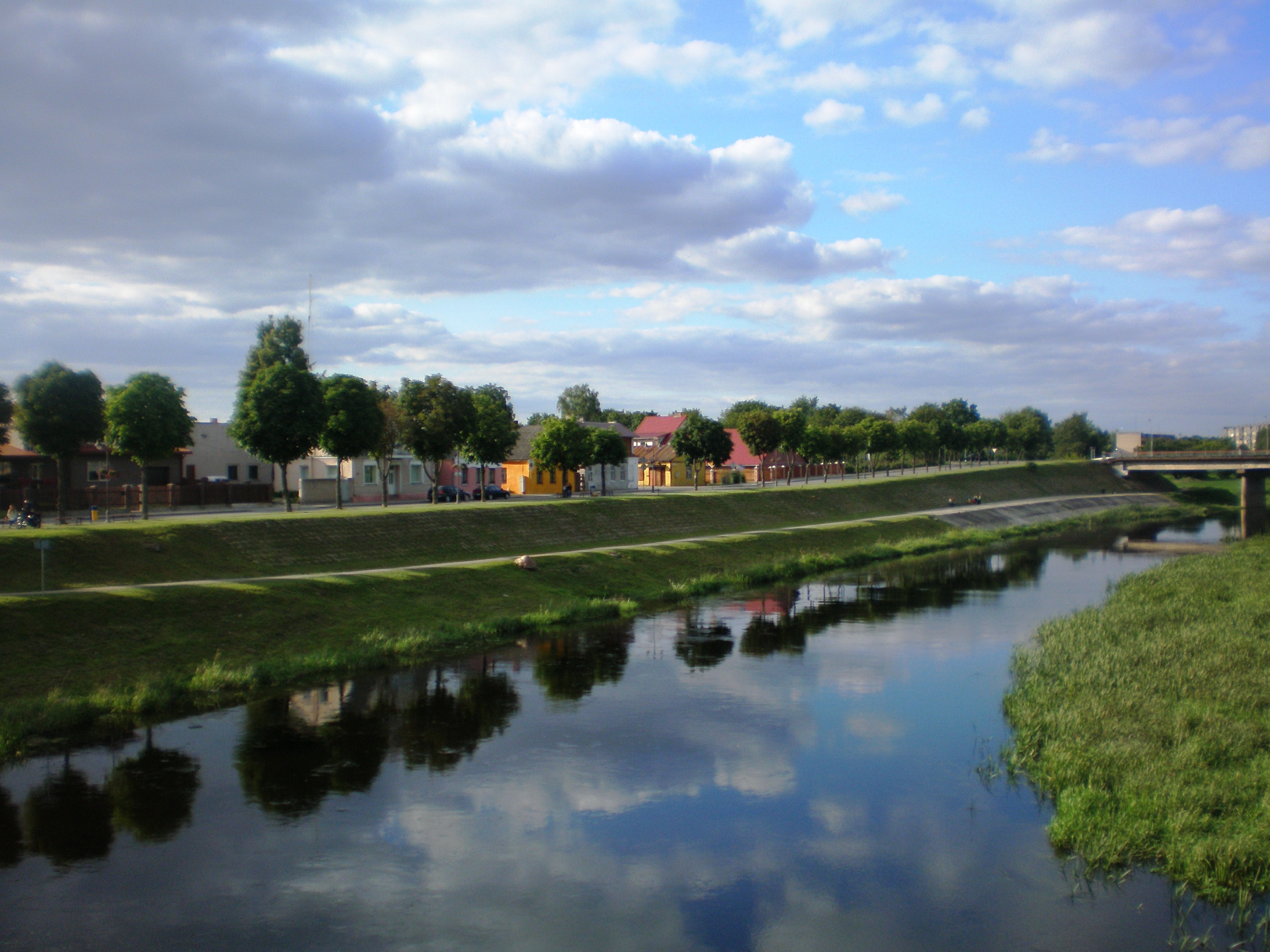
The river in Kėdainiai

Nevėžis has about seventy tributaries. The largest are:

- left: Alanta, Juoda, Upytė, Linkava, Brasta, Žalesys, Alkupis, Obelis, Šerkšnys, Ašarėna, Barupė, Gynia;
- right: Juosta, Kiršinas, Liaudė, Kruostas, Dotnuvėlė, Smilga, Šušvė (14th longest river in Lithuania), Aluona, Strūna.

In 1992, the Krekenava Regional Park was established in order to preserve the Middle Nevėžis ecosystem and natural surroundings. The park is unique because it breeds and tries to protect from extinction wisents, the European bison.

Even with two canals supplying Nevėžis with water, it becomes very shallow during a drier summer. Regularly it is between 4 and 9 meters deep. In more recent years, a number of grass carp was introduced to the river for aquatic weed control. The Nevėžis, due to its low level of water, slow current, and influx of the run-off of fertilizers from agriculture, was becoming more and more overgrown with weeds. It was hoped that the introduction of grass carp would help to control the process. Critics argued that the fish would not survive in the relatively cold climate. However, local fishermen still catch carp introduced several years ago.

== Canals ==
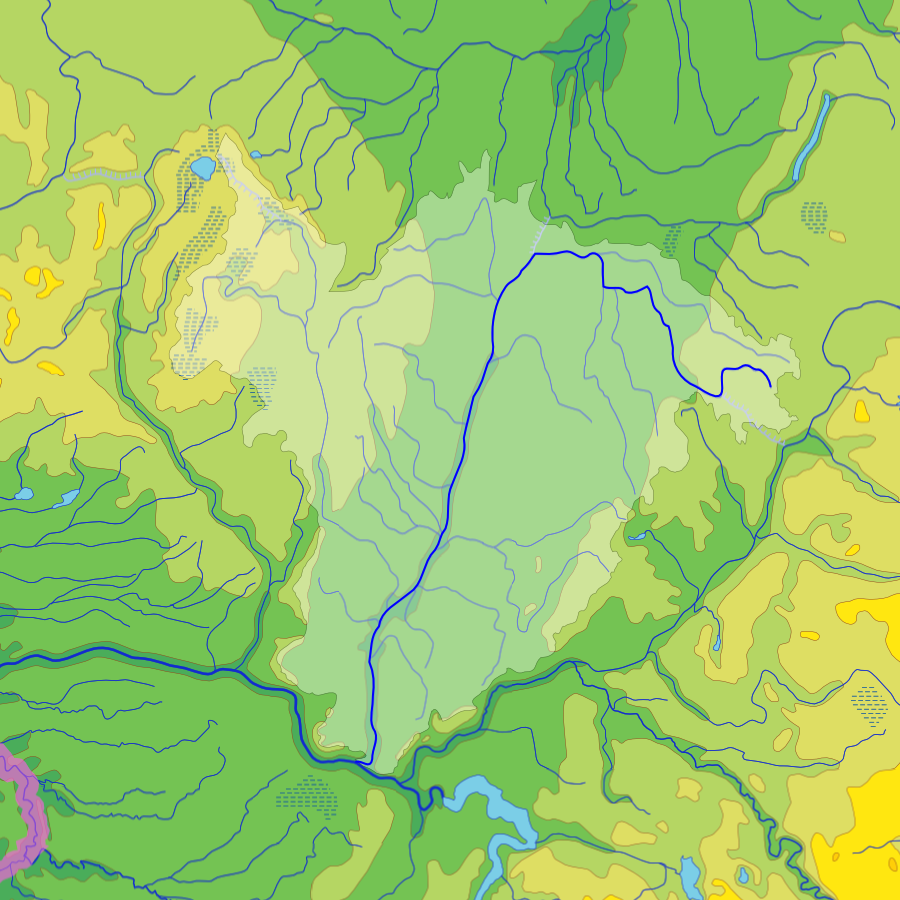
River Basin

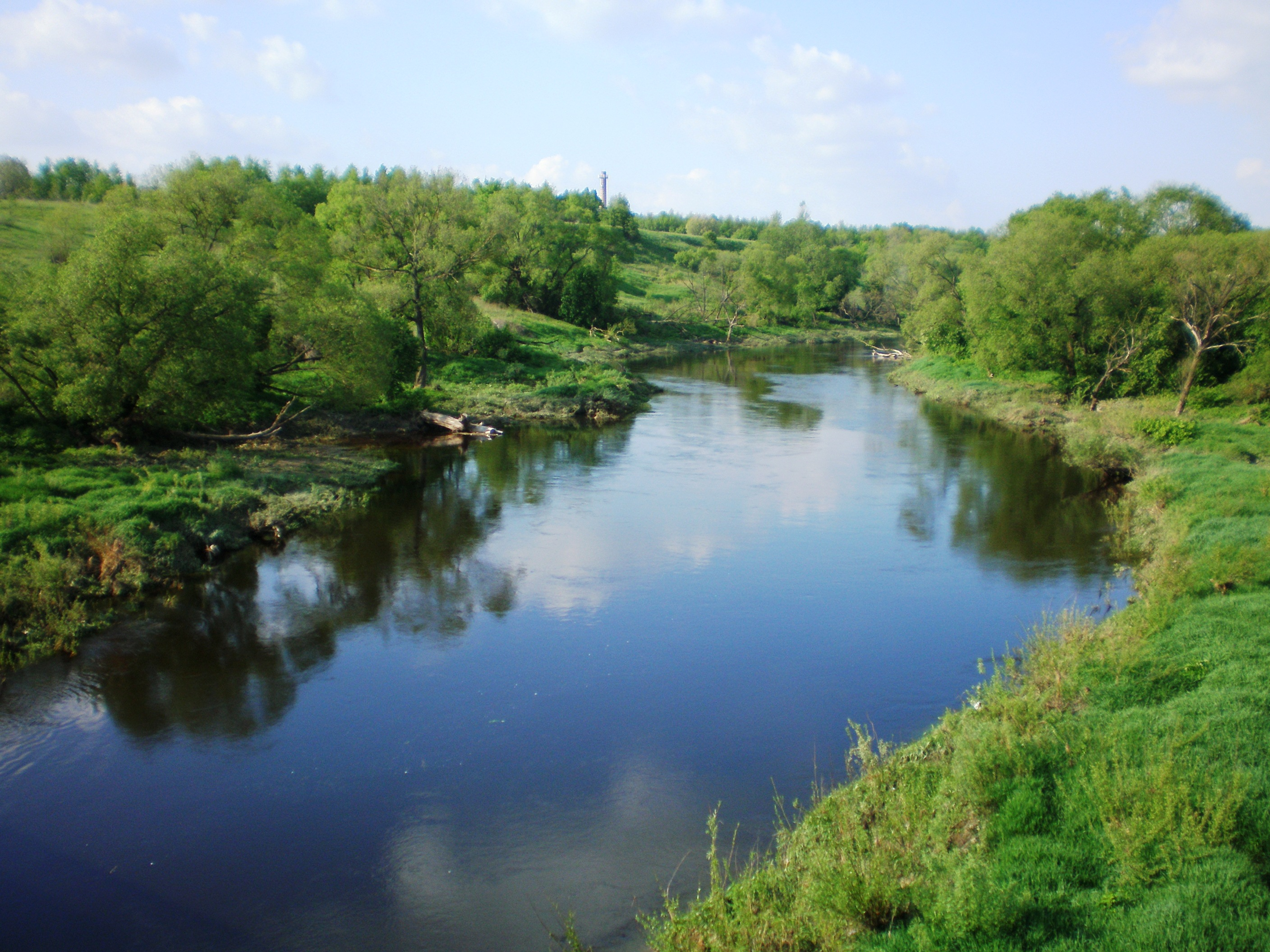
The river in Kėdainiai district municipality

The Nevėžis is connected with two other large rivers by canals. In order to reduce floods on the Lėvuo river, the Sanžilė Canal was dug in 1930. A draft to connect these rivers was first written in 1797. The location was very convenient: about 9,000 years ago Nevėžis was a tributary to Lėvuo. The land between the rivers was low and there was a small Sanžilė rivulet which could serve as the basis for the new canal. In the 19th century the Neman delta belonged to the Germans. This was an obstacle in trading. The Russian Empire was looking for ways to direct ships from the Neman directly to the port of Riga. The plan was abandoned because of insufficient funds. The idea was revisited again in 1914, the preparations for construction started but were interrupted by World War I. After reclaiming the origin of the Lėvuo, heavy rains would cause the flood of as many as twenty villages. It was decided to dig an 8 km length canal. In 1961–63 another canal connecting the Nevėžis with the Šventoji was finished. It is 12 km in length. There is a pumping station near Kavarskas to supply the canal with water.
