= Panevėžys District Municipality =

Coordinates: 55°39′N 24°21′E

Panevėžys District Municipality Panevėžio rajono savivaldybė
- Municipality
- Coat of arms
- Location of Panevėžys district municipality within Lithuania
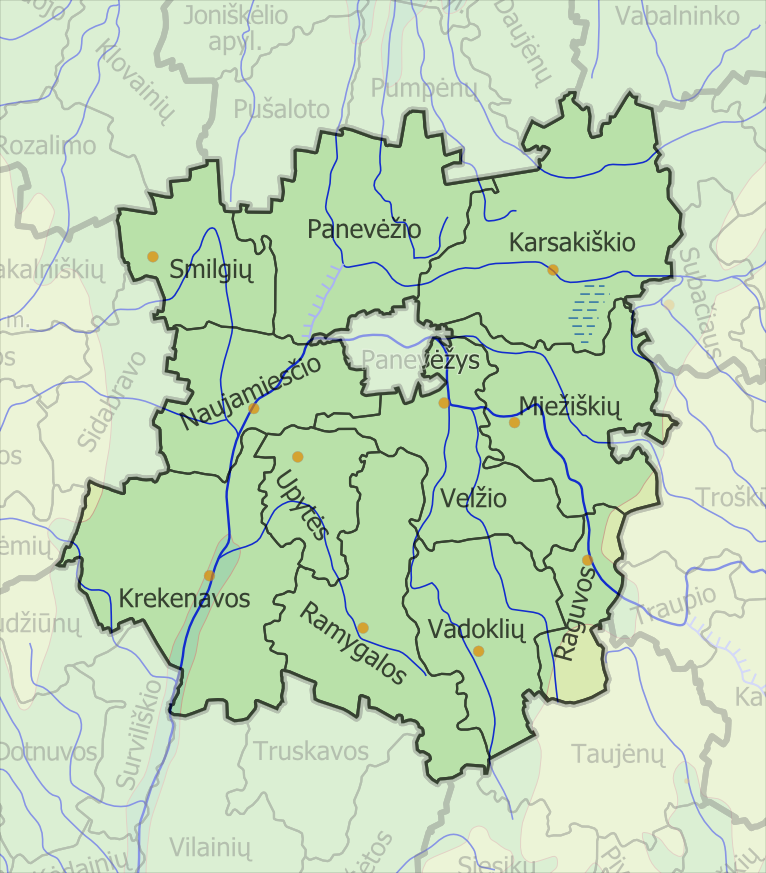
- Map of Panevėžys district municipality
- Country: Lithuania
- Ethnographic region: Aukštaitija
- County: Panevėžys County
- Capital: Panevėžys
- Elderships: 11

Area
  - Total: 2,179 km^{2} (841 sq mi)
  - Rank: 2nd

Population (2021)
  - Total: 35,426
  - Rank: 25th
  - Density: 16.26/km^{2} (42.11/sq mi)
  - Rank: 54th
- Time zone: UTC+2 (EET)
  - Summer (DST): UTC+3 (EEST)
- Telephone code: 45
- Major settlements: Krekenava (pop. 1,375); Ramygala (pop. 1,232)
- Website: www.panrs.lt

Panevėžys District Municipality is one of 60 municipalities in Lithuania.

== Notable residents ==
- Aleksander Meysztowicz (1864–1943), Polish politician, landowner, and social activist
