= Skaudinis =

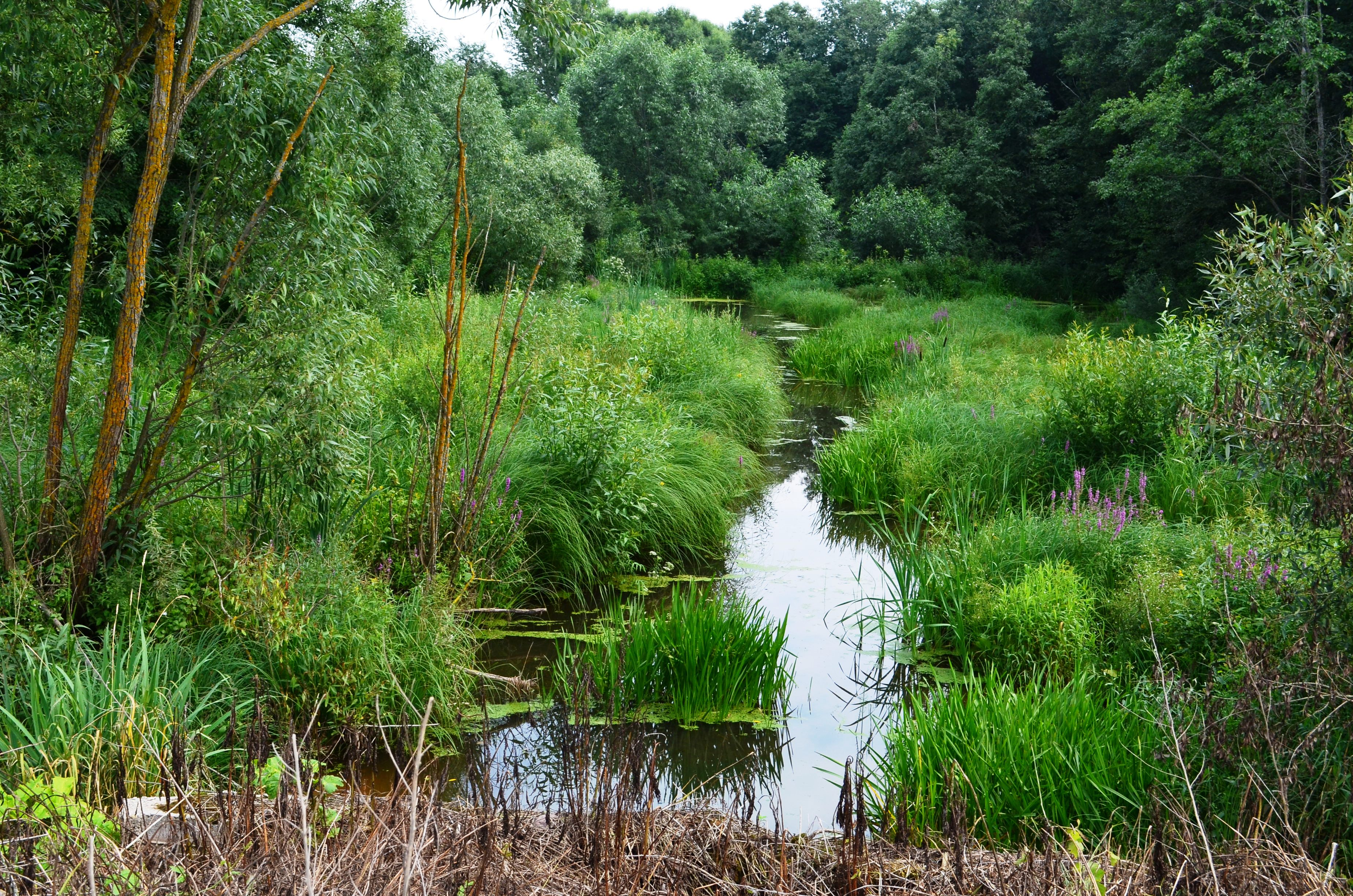
- Skaudinis lower course in Mociūnai

Location
- Country: Lithuania
- Region: Kėdainiai district municipality, Kaunas County

Physical characteristics
- Source
  - location: Puodžiai surroundings
- Mouth: Kruostas in Mociūnai
  - coordinates: 55°22′14″N 23°58′24″E
- Length: 10.2 km (6.3 mi)
- Basin size: 19.8 km^{2} (7.6 sq mi)

Basin features
- Progression: Kruostas→Nevėžis→ Neman→ Baltic Sea
- Tributaries
  - left: Balniavalkis, Liūnai, Pakruostelė (or Barškupys)

The Skaudinis is a river of Kėdainiai district municipality, Kaunas County, central Lithuania. It originates next to Puodžiai village, 1.5 km from Šlapaberžė, then flows across the Kalnaberžė Forest, then reaches the Kruostas river from the left side, forming a deep valley. By the Skaudinis and Kruostas confluence Vaidatoniai hillfort is located.

The river passes through Puodžiai, Vaidatoniai and Mociūnai villages.

The name Skaudinis comes from Lithuanian skaudus or skaudrus ('swift, torrential, hasty, pungent').
