= Urbeliai =

- Village
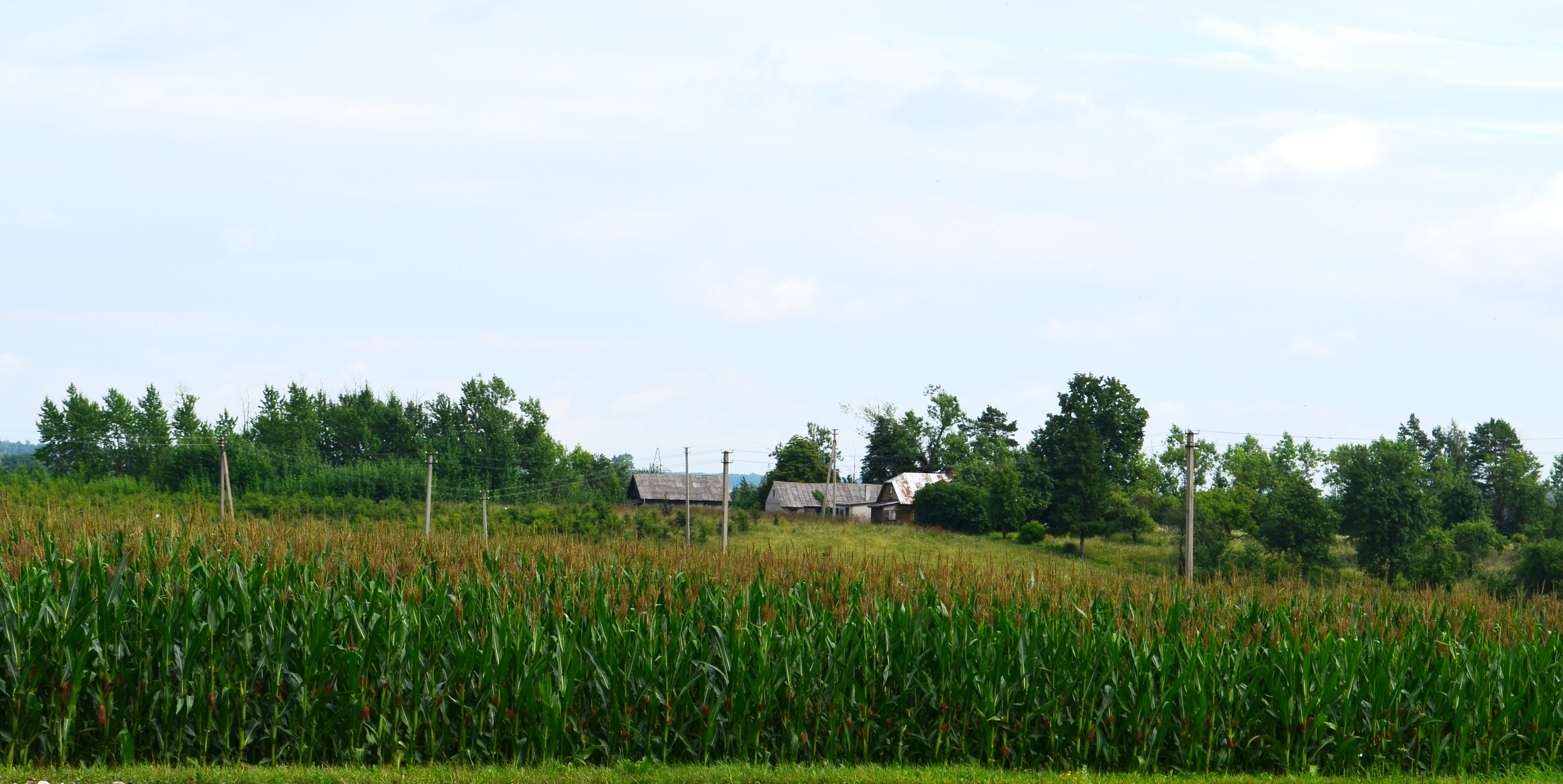

- Location in Lithuania
- Coordinates: 55°22′30″N 23°59′31″E
- Country: Lithuania
- County: Kaunas County
- Municipality: Kėdainiai district municipality
- Eldership: Surviliškis Eldership

Population (2011)
  - Total: 5
- Time zone: UTC+2 (EET)
  - Summer (DST): UTC+3 (EEST)

Urbeliai is a village in Kėdainiai district municipality, in Kaunas County, in central Lithuania. According to the 2011 census, the village has a population of 5 people. It is located 1.5 km from Sirutiškis, by the regional road Kėdainiai-Krekenava-Panevėžys, on the right bank of the Nevėžis river, next to the mouth of its tributary the Kruostas. There is a former hydroelectric power plant (now in ruins) on the Nevėžis near Urbeliai.

== Demography ==
Historical population

Year	Pop.	±% p.a.
1959	51	—
1970	34	−3.62%
1979	19	−6.26%

Year	Pop.	±% p.a.
1989	13	−3.72%
2001	9	−3.02%
2011	5	−5.71%

Source: 1902, 1923, 1959 & 1970, 1979, 1989, 2001, 2011

== Images ==
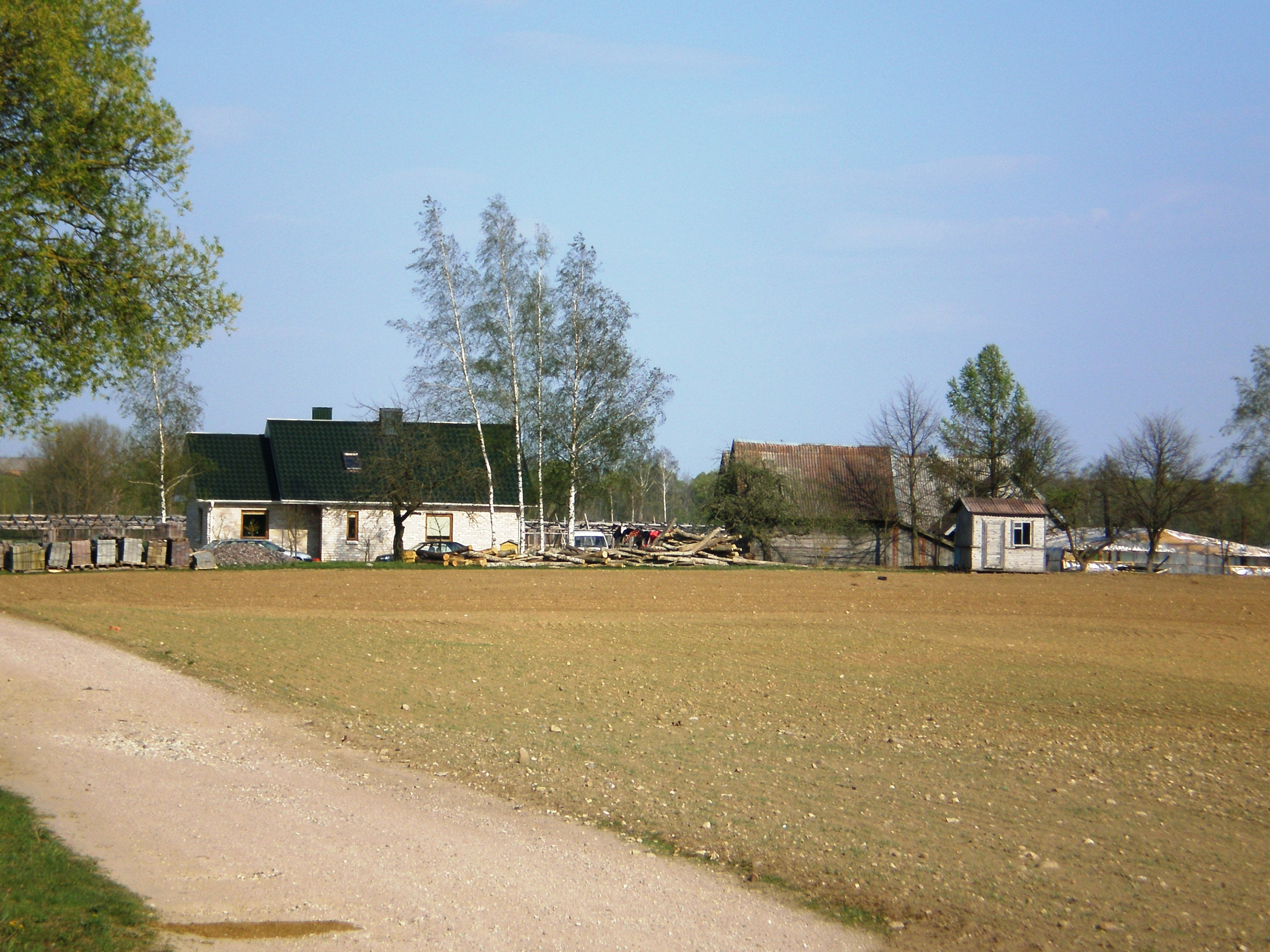
Urbeliai by the road to the power plant

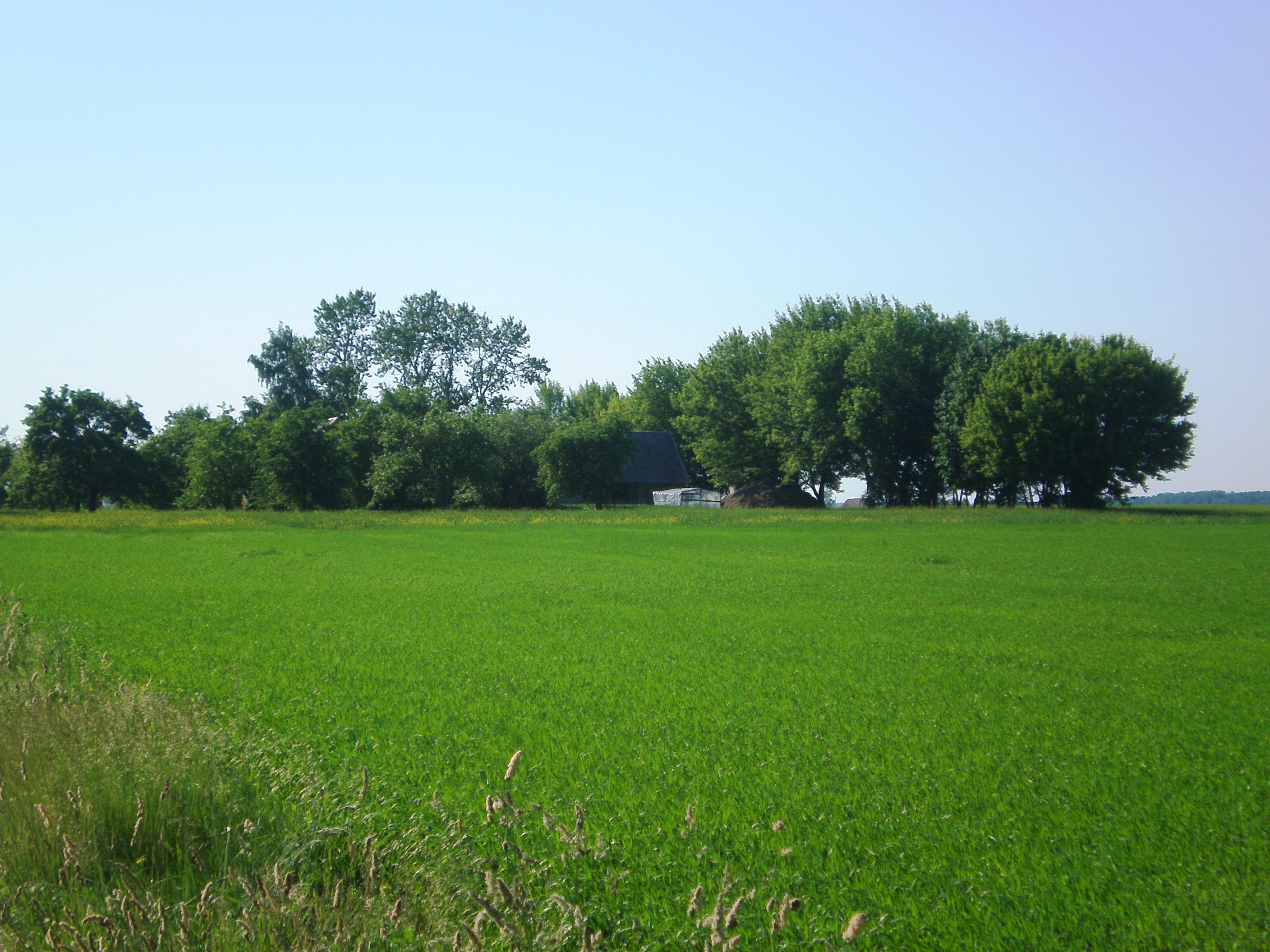
Urbeliai by the road to Vaidatoniai

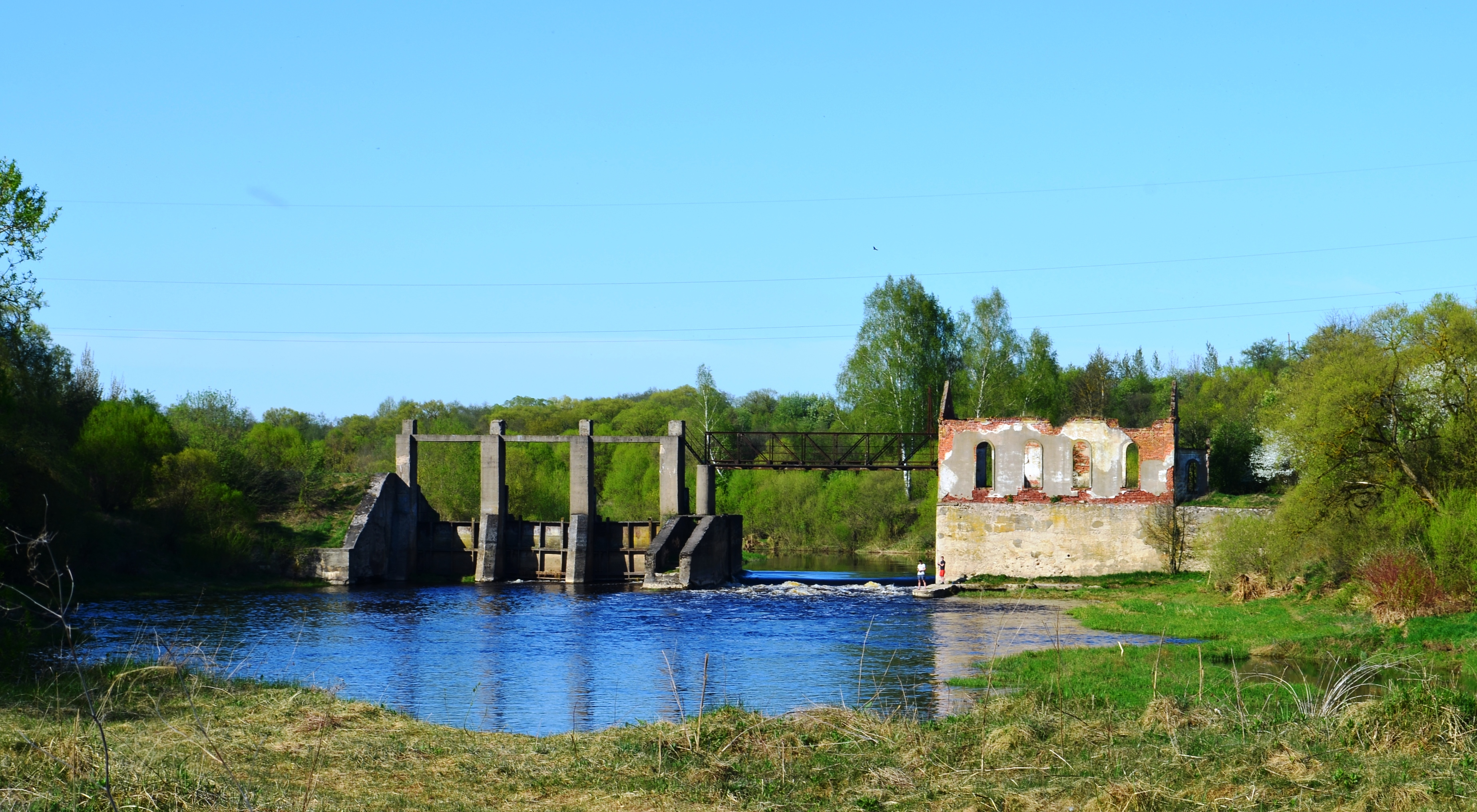
Former "Kruostas" power plant on the Nevėžis
