= Kutiškiai, Kėdainiai =

Kutiškiai
- Village
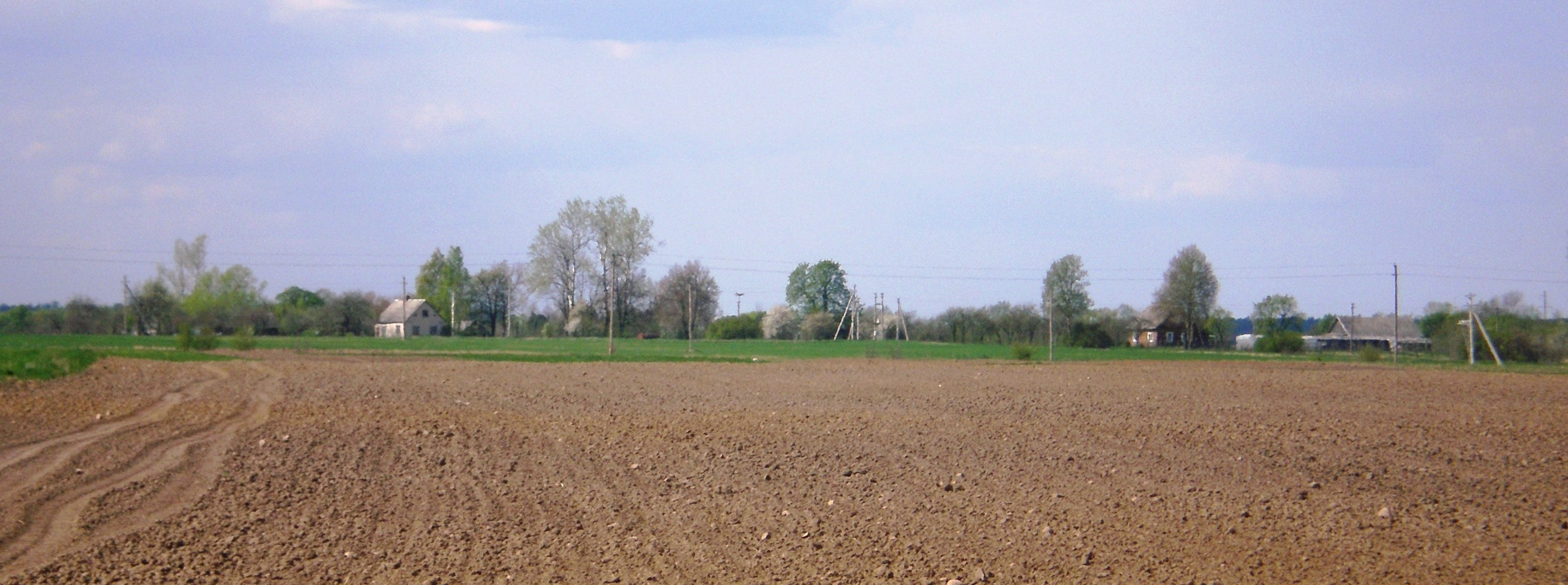

- Location in Lithuania
- Coordinates: 55°21′58″N 23°58′34″E
- Country: Lithuania
- County: Kaunas County
- Municipality: Kėdainiai district municipality
- Eldership: Surviliškis Eldership

Population (2011)
  - Total: 21
- Time zone: UTC+2 (EET)
  - Summer (DST): UTC+3 (EEST)

Kutiškiai (formerly Polish: Kutyszki, Russian: Кутышки) is a village in Kėdainiai district municipality, in Kaunas County, in central Lithuania. According to the 2011 census, the village had a population of 21 people. It is located one km (0.62 mi) from Sirutiškis, by the river Kruostas. There is old cemetery by the regional road Kėdainiai-Krekenava-Panevėžys.

== Demography ==
Historical population

Year	Pop.	±% p.a.
1902	85	—
1923	82	−0.17%
1959	107	+0.74%
1970	93	−1.27%

Year	Pop.	±% p.a.
1979	55	−5.67%
1989	25	−7.58%
2001	24	−0.34%
2011	21	−1.33%

Source: 1902, 1923, 1959 & 1970, 1979, 1989, 2001, 2011

== Images ==
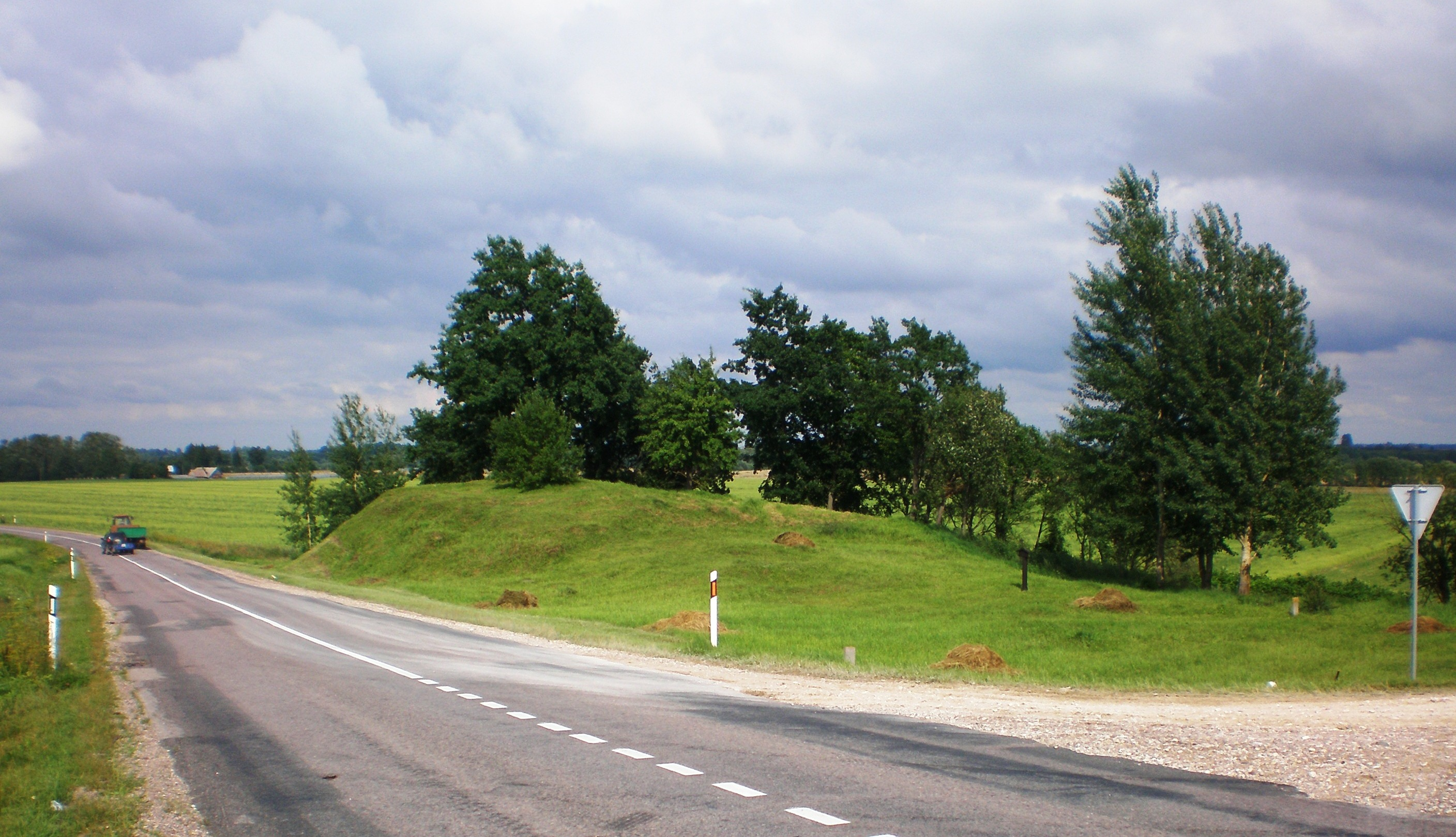
Former cemetery

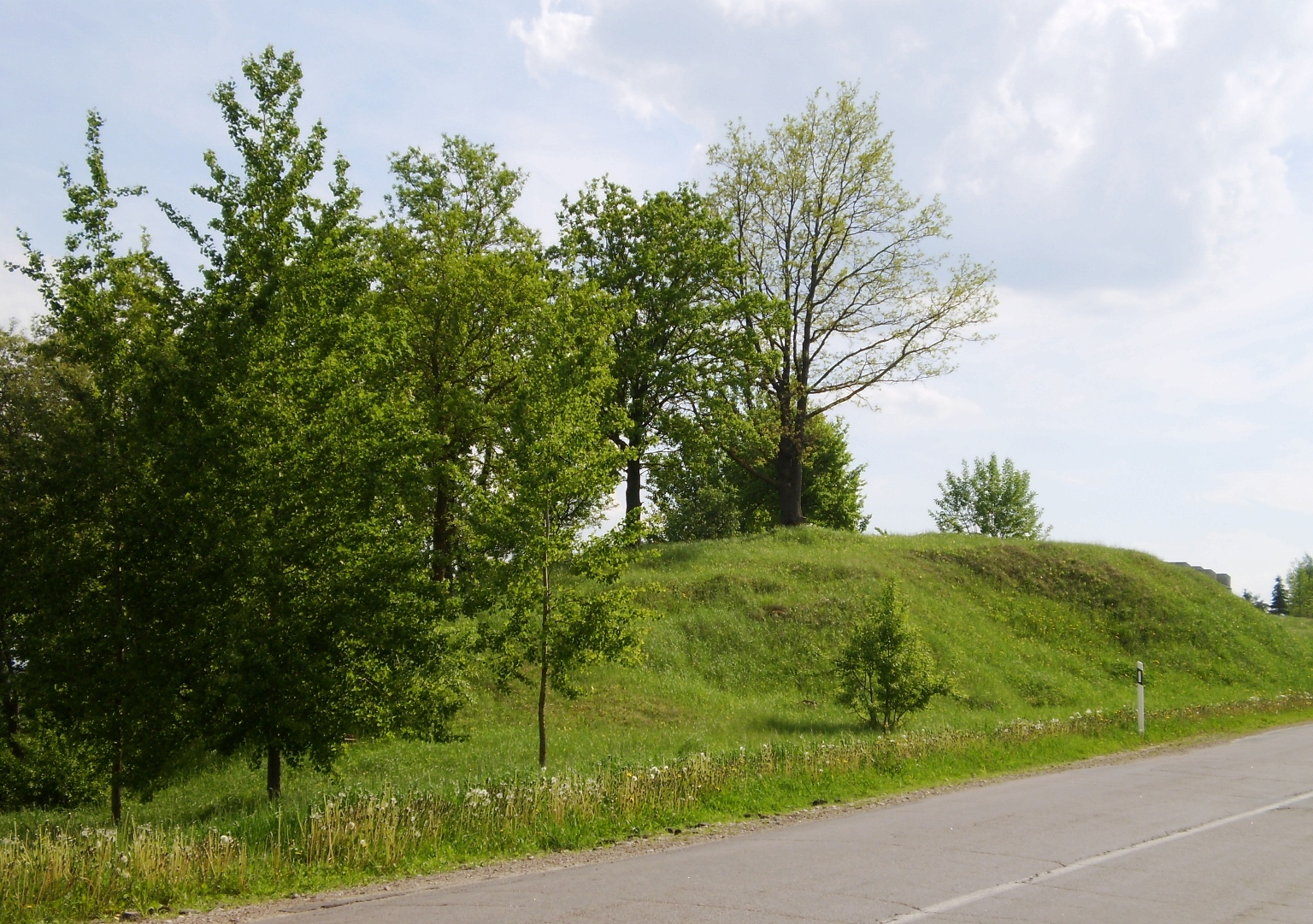
Former cemetery

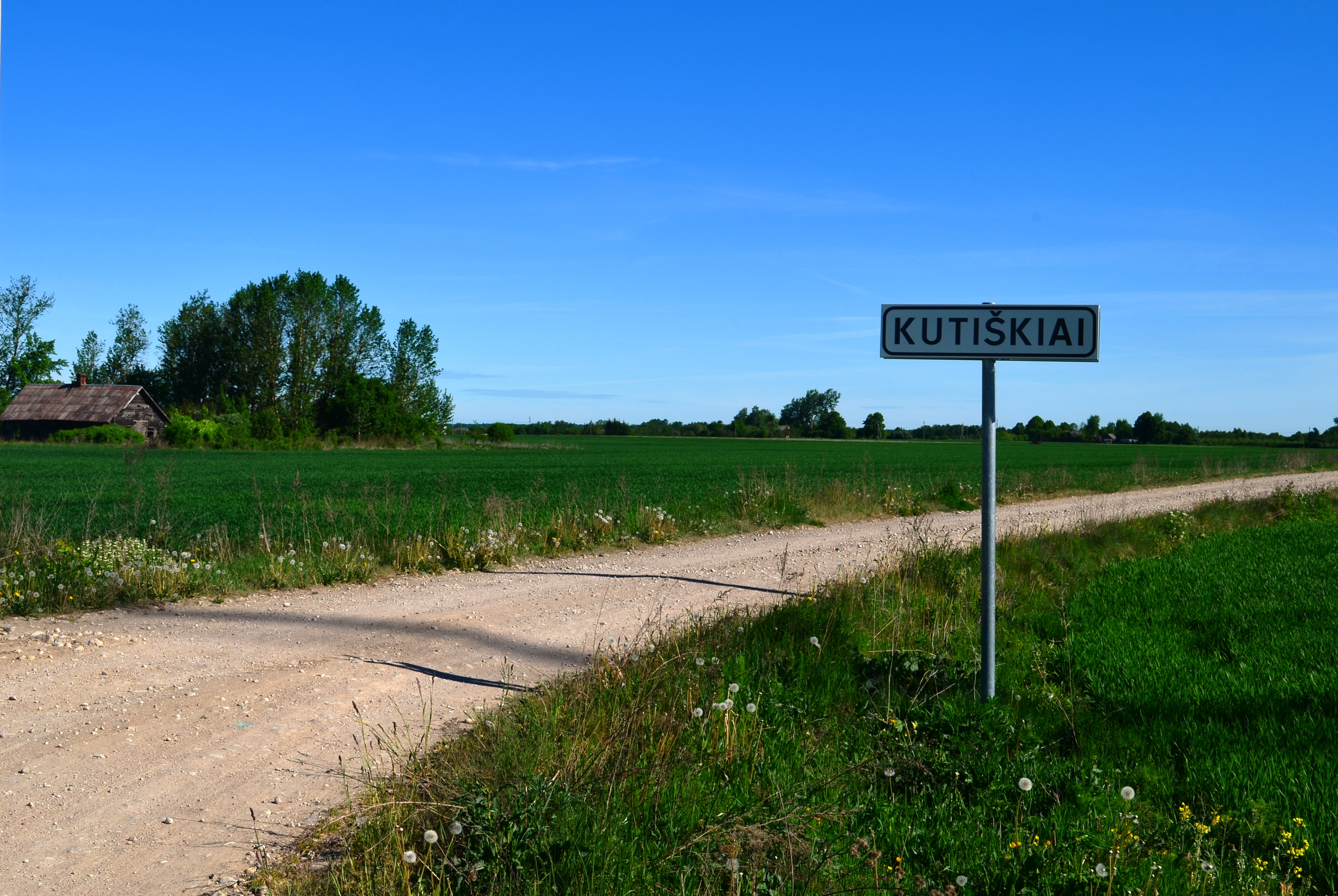
A road sign
