= Daškoniai =

- Village
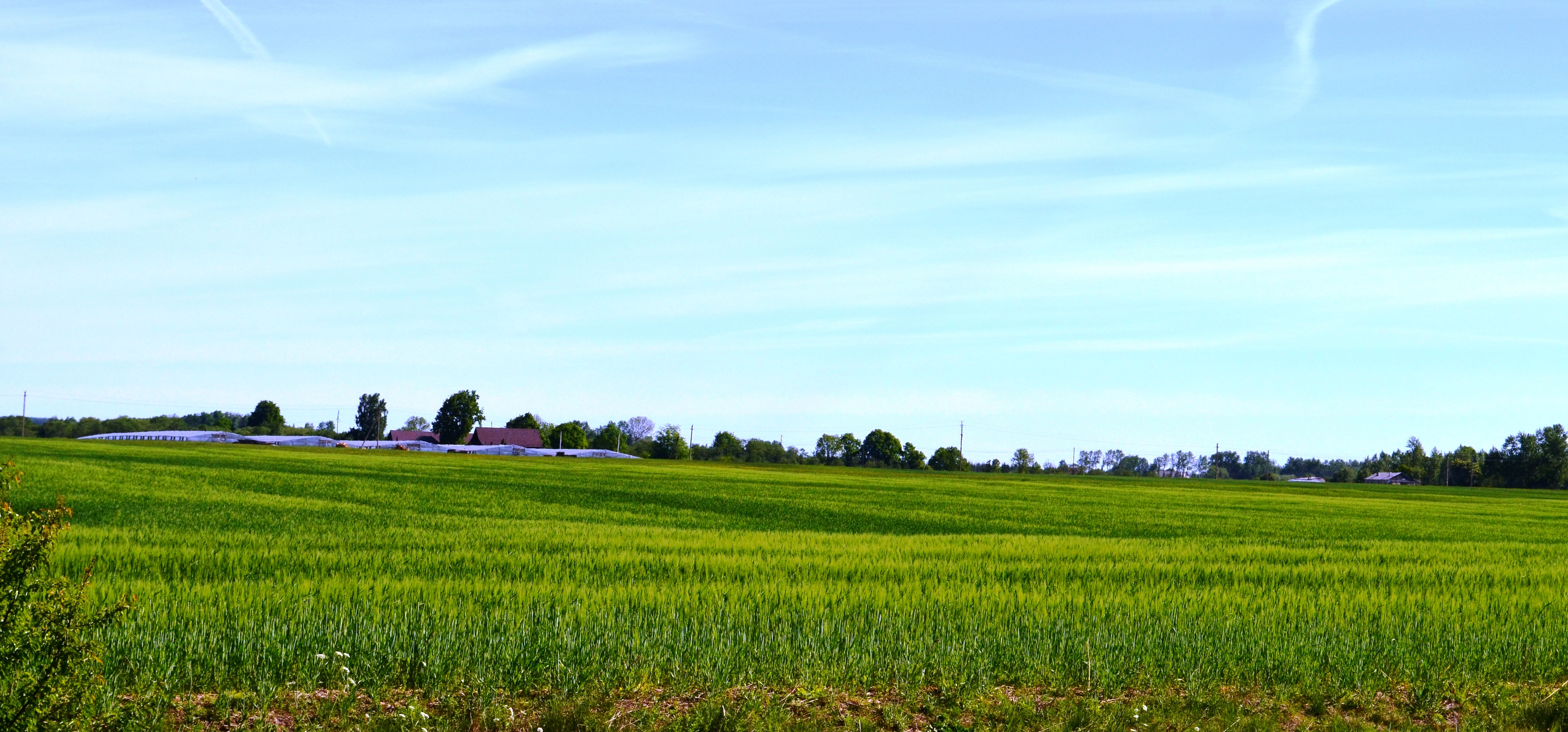

- Location in Lithuania Daškoniai (Lithuania)
- Coordinates: 55°22′05″N 23°57′22″E
- Country: Lithuania
- County: Kaunas County
- Municipality: Kėdainiai district municipality
- Eldership: Surviliškis Eldership

Population (2011)
  - Total: 13
- Time zone: UTC+2 (EET)
  - Summer (DST): UTC+3 (EEST)

Daškoniai (formerly Polish: Daszkańce, Russian: Дашканцы) is a village in Kėdainiai district municipality, in Kaunas County, in central Lithuania. According to the 2011 census, the village had a population of 13 people. It is located 4 km from Kėdainiai, 2 km from Sirutiškis by the Kruostas river. One of the main cemeteries of Kėdainiai is in Daškoniai village.

== History ==
At the beginning of the 20th century, Daškoniai was an okolica.

== Demography ==
Historical population

Year	Pop.	±% p.a.
1902	146	—
1923	134	−0.41%
1959	78	−1.49%
1970	77	−0.12%

Year	Pop.	±% p.a.
1979	19	−14.40%
1989	8	−8.29%
2001	20	+7.93%
2011	13	−4.22%

Source: 1902, 1923, 1959 & 1970, 1979, 1989, 2001, 2011

== Images ==
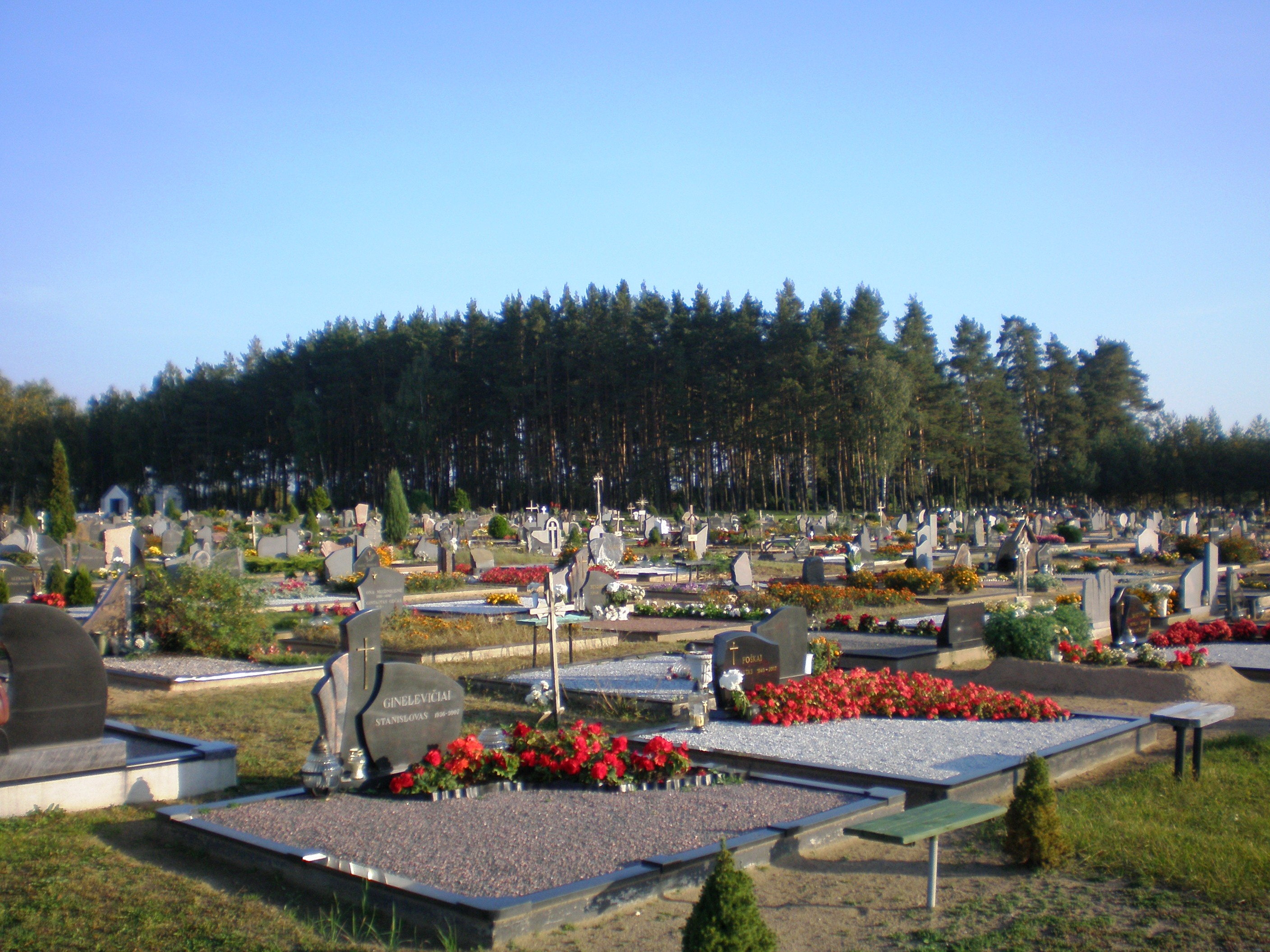
Daškoniai cemetery

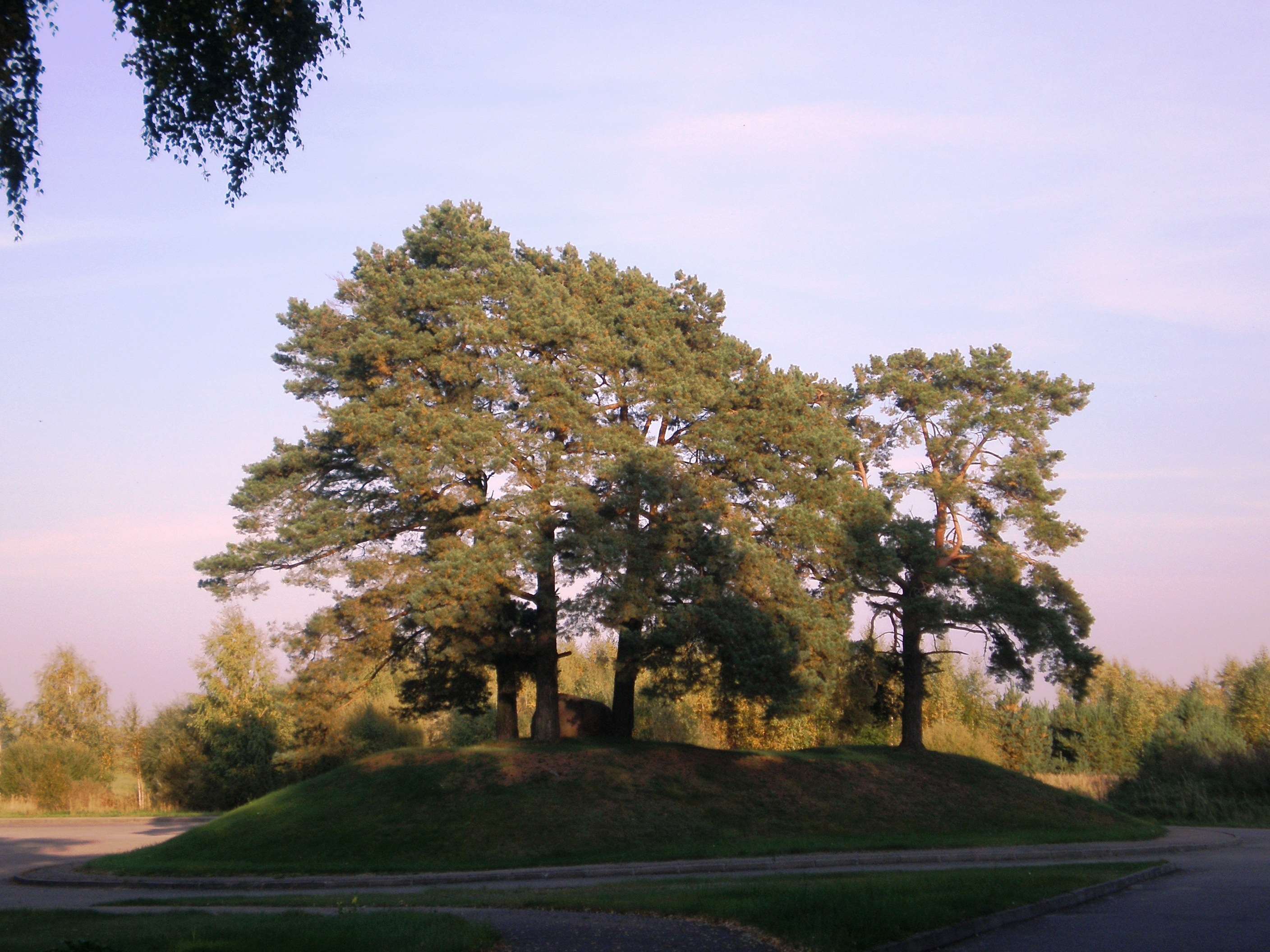
Pine trees by the cemetery
