= Žilvičiai, Kėdainiai =

Žilvičiai
- Village
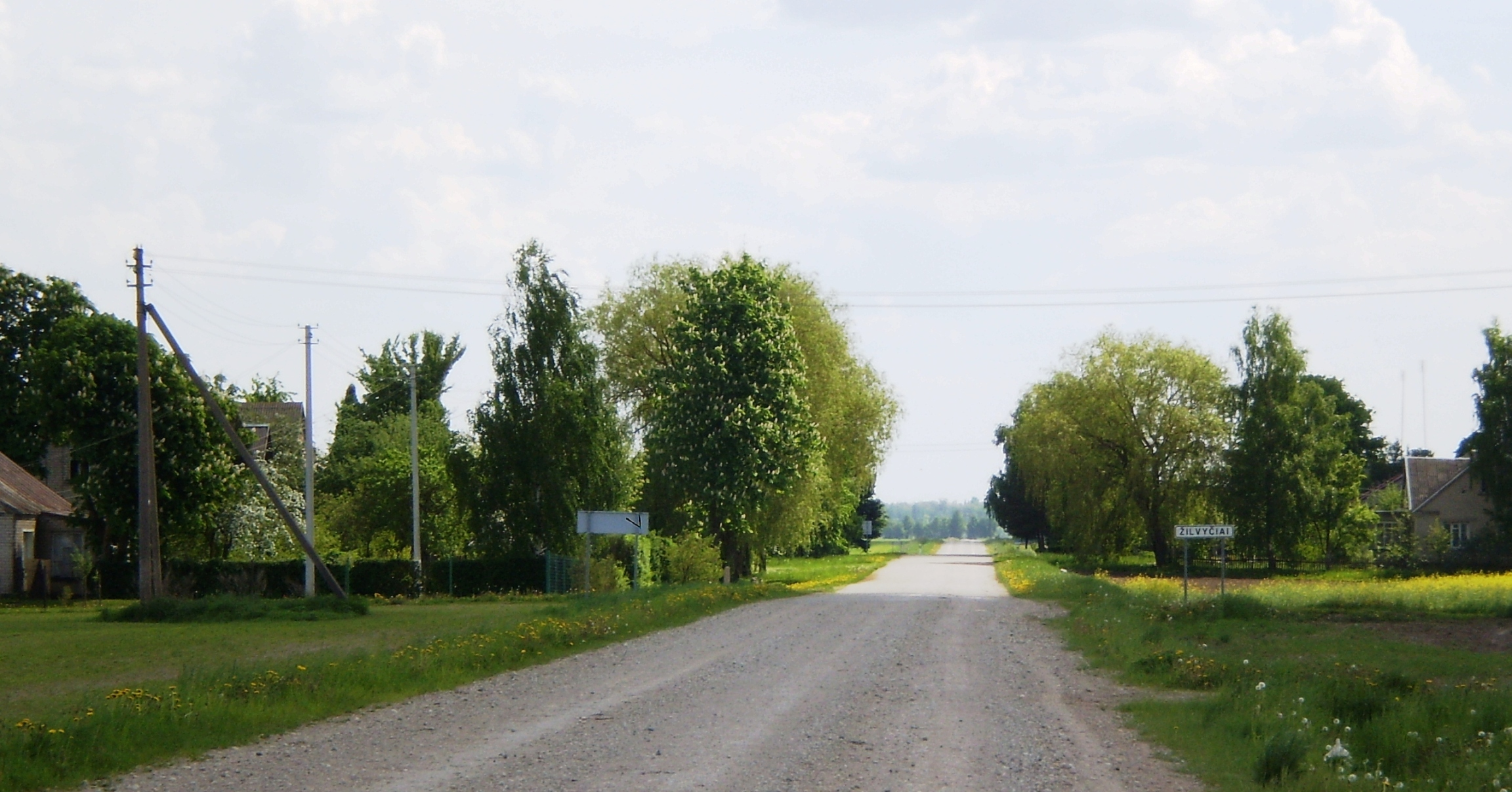

- Location in Lithuania
- Coordinates: 55°27′40″N 23°50′49″E
- Country: Lithuania
- County: Kaunas County
- Municipality: Kėdainiai district municipality
- Eldership: Gudžiūnai Eldership

Population (2011)
  - Total: 48
- Time zone: UTC+2 (EET)
  - Summer (DST): UTC+3 (EEST)

Žilvičiai is a village in Kėdainiai district municipality, in Kaunas County, in central Lithuania. According to the 2011 census, the village had a population of 48 people. It is located 3 km from Mantviliškis village, by the Kruostas river.

Žilvičiai was established in 1926, after the Grużewski's folwarks of Liubomislis and Zofijava had been parcelated.

== Demography ==
Historical population

Year	Pop.	±% p.a.
1940	130	—
1959	115	−0.64%
1970	86	−2.61%
1979	69	−2.42%

Year	Pop.	±% p.a.
1989	63	−0.91%
2001	48	−2.24%
2011	48	+0.00%

Source: 1902, 1923, 1959 & 1970, 1979, 1989, 2001, 2011
