= Beržai =

- Village
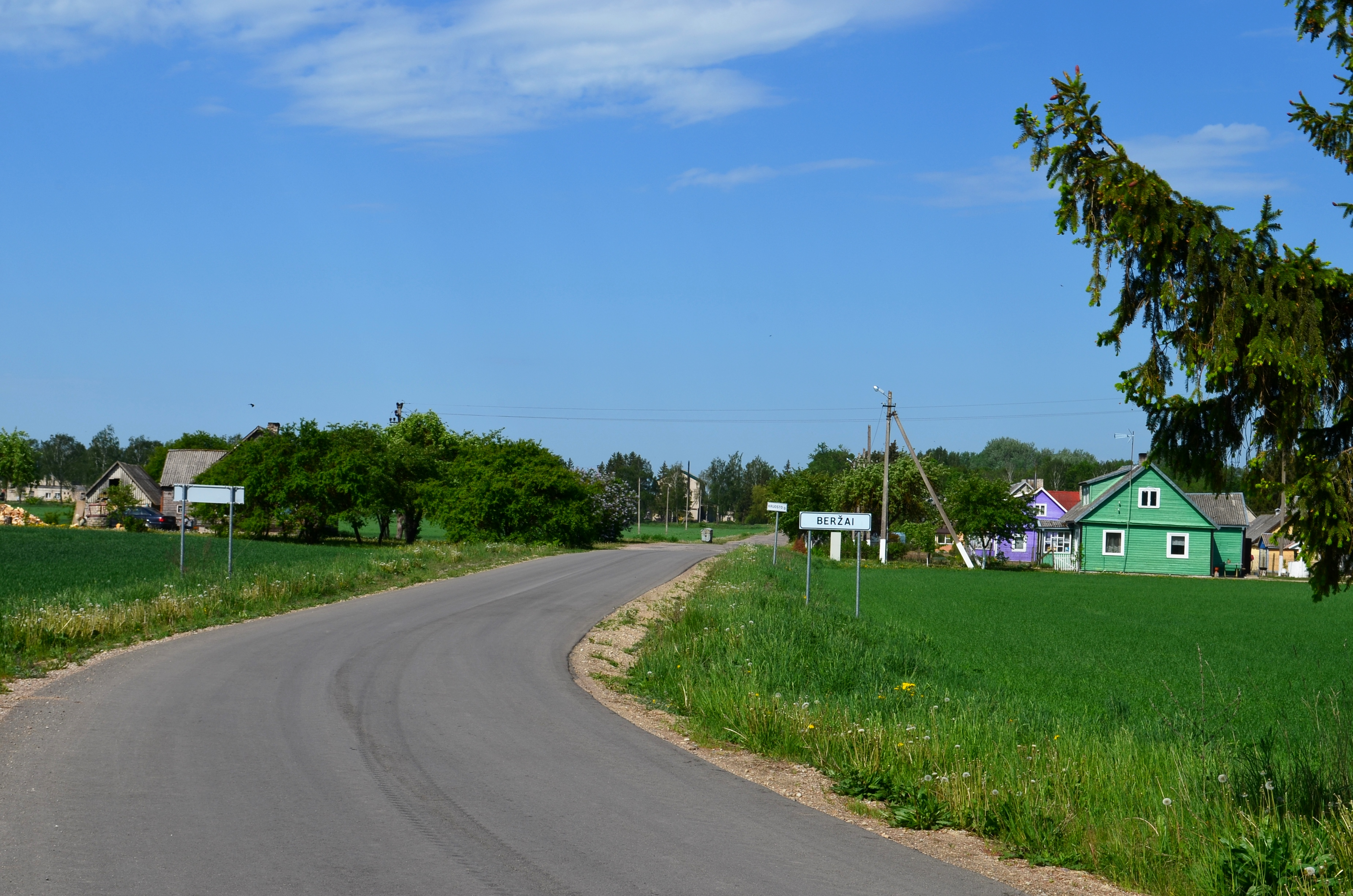

- Location in Lithuania
- Coordinates: 55°24′0″N 23°53′50″E
- Country: Lithuania
- County: Kaunas County
- Municipality: Kėdainiai district municipality
- Eldership: Dotnuva Eldership

Population (2011)
  - Total: 214
- Time zone: UTC+2 (EET)
  - Summer (DST): UTC+3 (EEST)

Beržai is a village in Kėdainiai district municipality, in Kaunas County, central Lithuania. It is located by the Kruostas river and Vaidatoniai pond, 4 km (2.5 mi) from Dotnuva. According to the 2011 census, the village has a population of 214 people. Beržai is the site of an ancient burial place.

== Demography ==
Historical population

Year	Pop.	±% p.a.
1902	316	—
1923	140	−3.80%
1959	291	+2.05%

Year	Pop.	±% p.a.
1970	368	+2.16%
1979	395	+0.79%
1984	328	−3.65%

Year	Pop.	±% p.a.
1989	316	−0.74%
2001	256	−1.74%
2011	214	−1.78%

Source: 1902, 1923, 1959 & 1970, 1979, 1989, 2001, 2011
