= Baltupis =

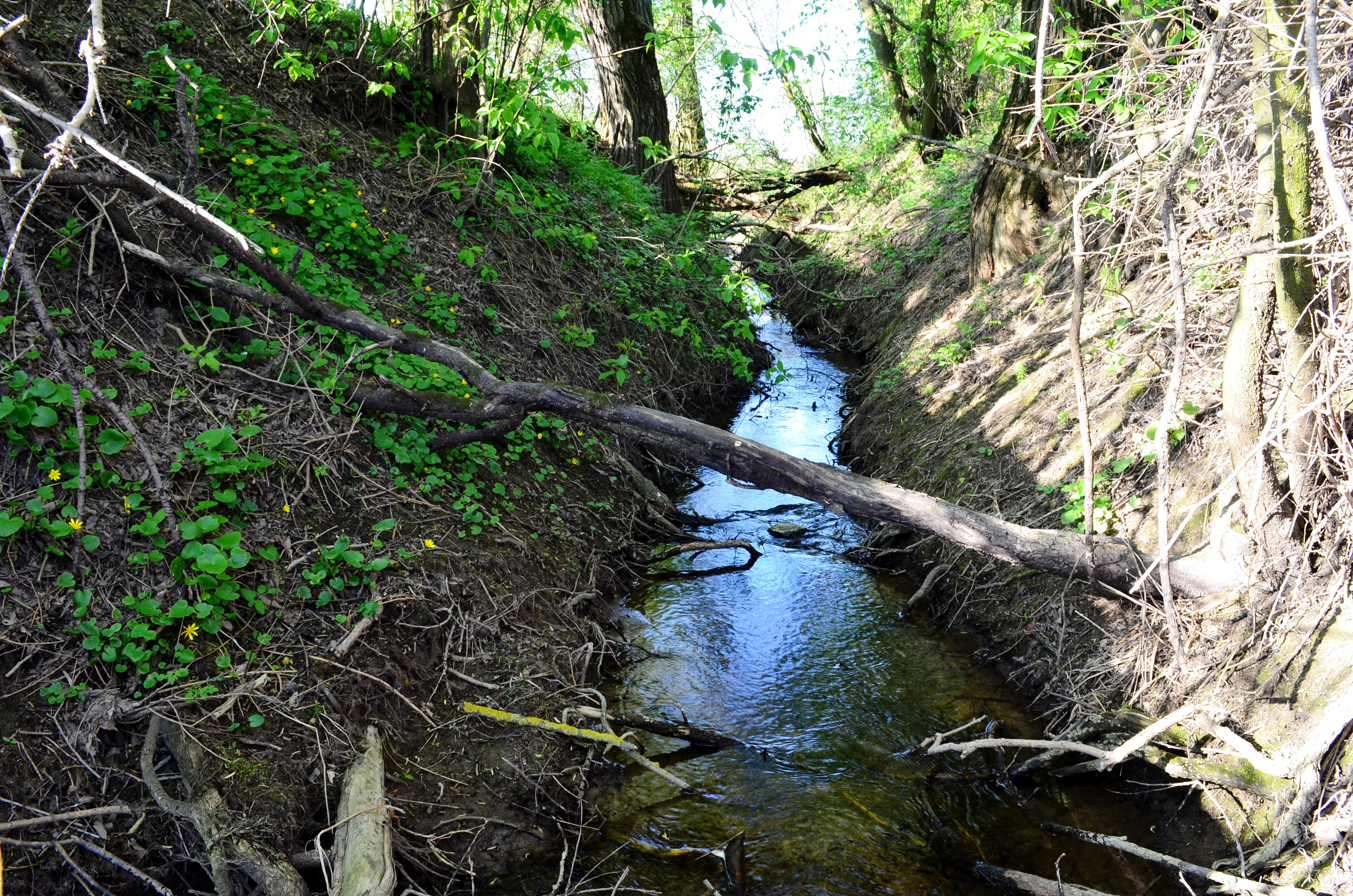

Location
- Country: Lithuania
- Location: Kėdainiai district municipality, Kaunas County

Physical characteristics
- Source
  - location: Next to Sirutiškis
- Mouth
  - location: Nevėžis River
  - coordinates: 55°20′55″N 23°59′45″E
- Length: 4.8 km (3.0 mi)
- Basin size: 2.7 km^{2} (1.0 sq mi)

Basin features
- Progression: Nevėžis→ Neman→ Baltic Sea

The Baltupis is a river of Kėdainiai district municipality, Kaunas County, central Lithuania. It flows for 4.8 kilometres and has a basin area of 2.7 km². It is a tributary of the Nevėžis River. The Baltupis goes on the edge between Sirutiškis village and the northern limit of Kėdainiai (Babėnai).

The name Baltupis means 'white river' in Lithuainian.

== Images ==
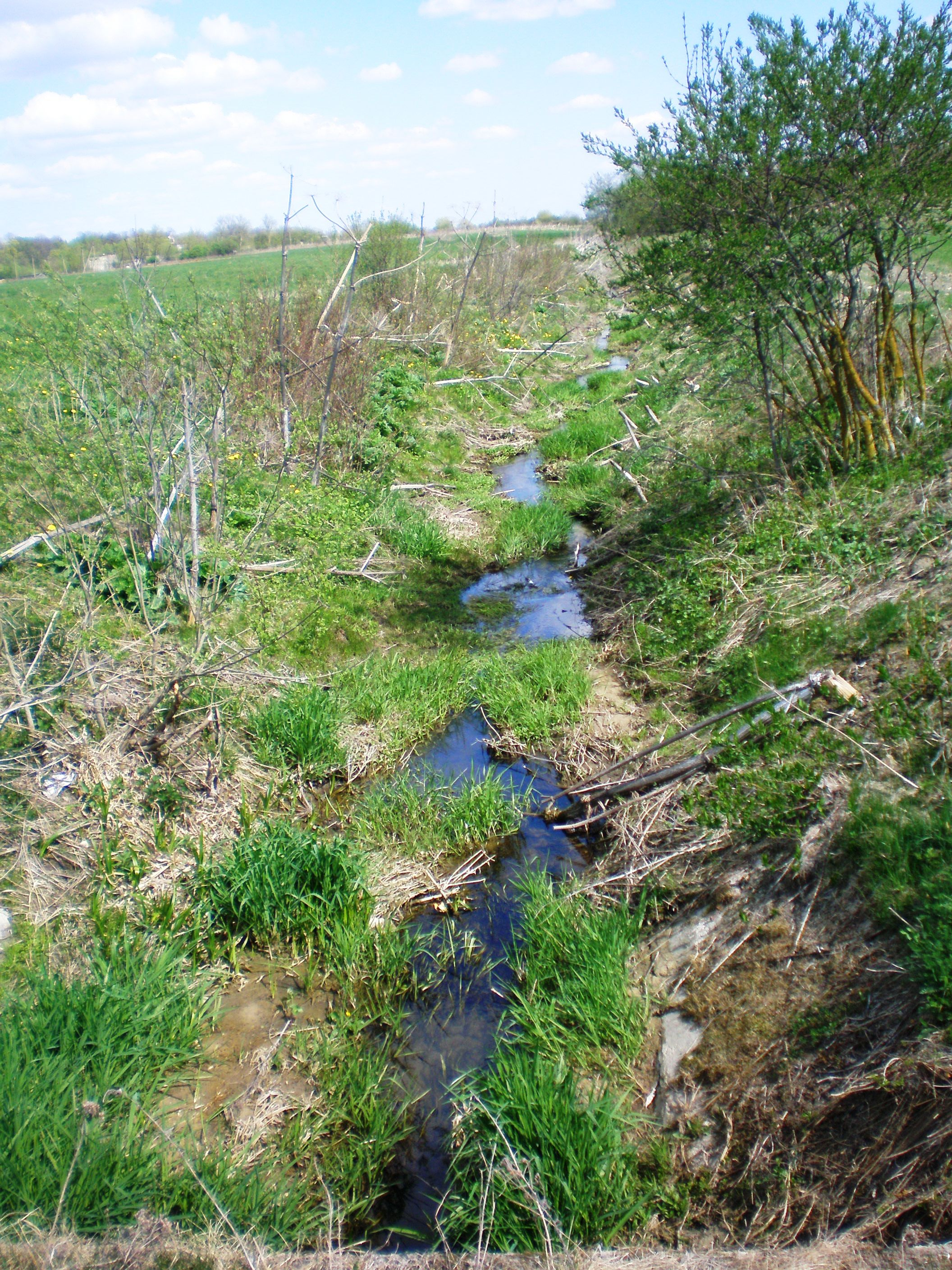

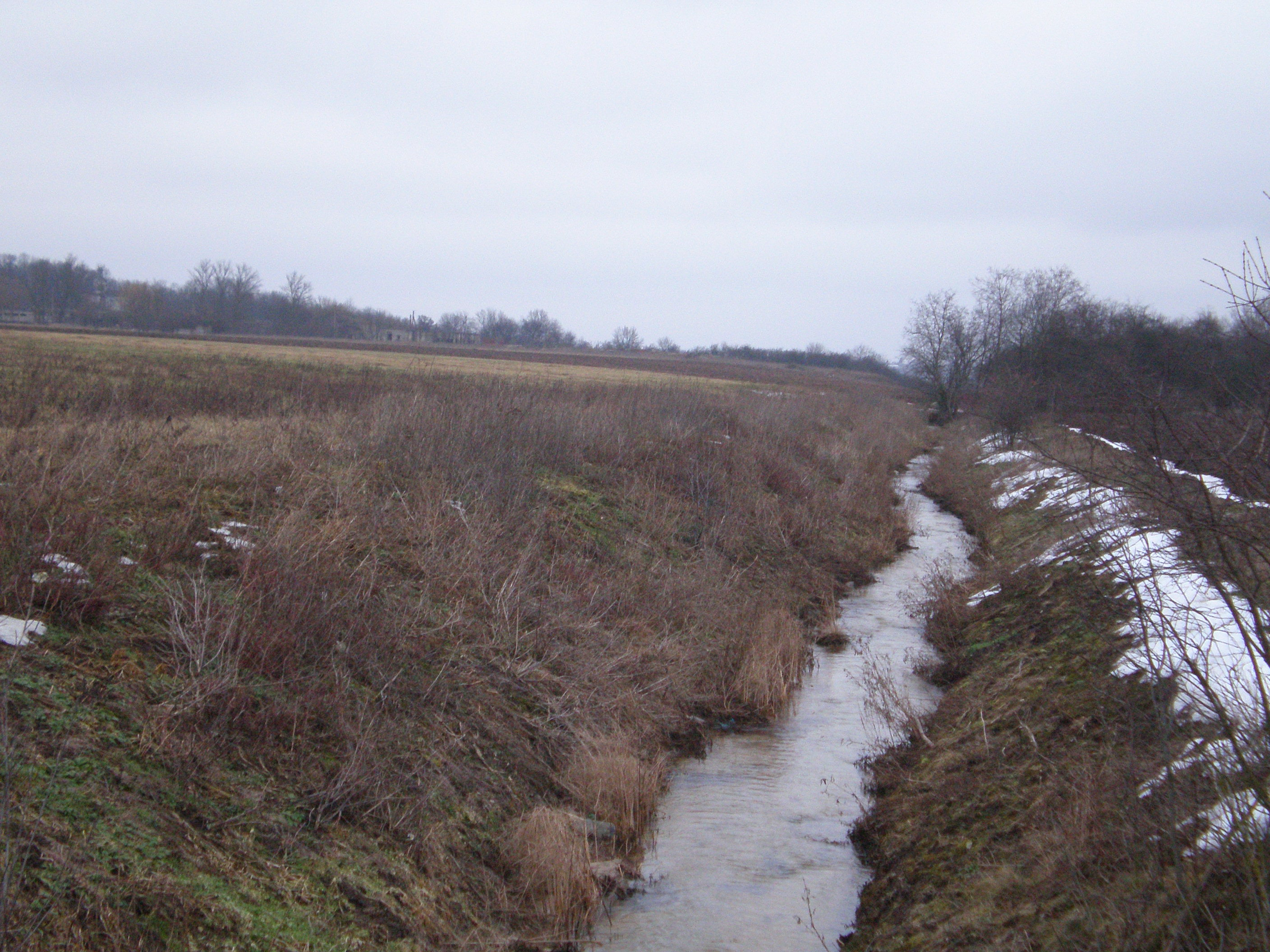
