= Vaidatoniai =

- Village
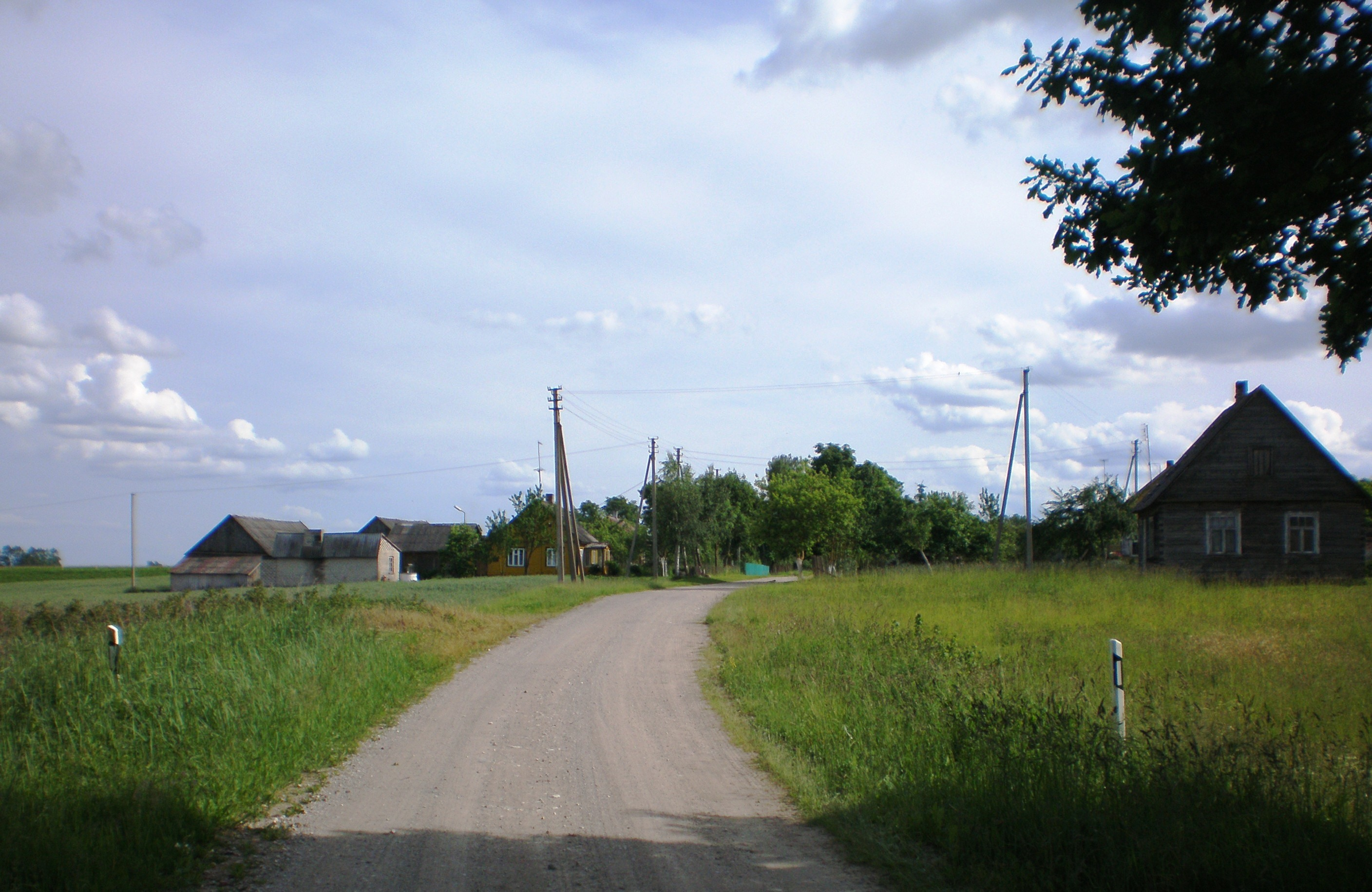

- Location in Lithuania Vaidatoniai (Lithuania)
- Coordinates: 55°22′59″N 23°57′29″E
- Country: Lithuania
- County: Kaunas County
- Municipality: Kėdainiai district municipality
- Eldership: Surviliškis Eldership

Population (2011)
  - Total: 53
- Time zone: UTC+2 (EET)
  - Summer (DST): UTC+3 (EEST)

Vaidatoniai (formerly Polish: Wojdotany, Russian: Войдатаны) is a village in Kėdainiai district municipality, in Kaunas County, in central Lithuania. According to the 2011 census, the village has a population of 53 people. It is located 7 km from Kėdainiai, by the Kruostas river, nearby the Kalnaberžė Forest. There are a cemetery, former school in Vaidatoniai, also a hillfort next to Mociūnai village.

== History ==
At the end of the 19th century Vaidatoniai was a property of Dotnuva Manor.

== Demography ==
Historical population

| Year | Pop. | ±% p.a. |
|---|---|---|
| 1820 | 160 | — |
| 1902 | 360 | +0.99% |
| 1923 | 365 | +0.07% |
| 1959 | 310 | −0.45% |
| 1970 | 213 | −3.35% |

| Year | Pop. | ±% p.a. |
|---|---|---|
| 1979 | 142 | −4.41% |
| 1987 | 95 | −4.90% |
| 1989 | 75 | −11.15% |
| 2001 | 83 | +0.85% |
| 2011 | 53 | −4.39% |

Source: 1902, 1923, 1959 & 1970, 1979, 1989, 2001, 2011

== Images ==
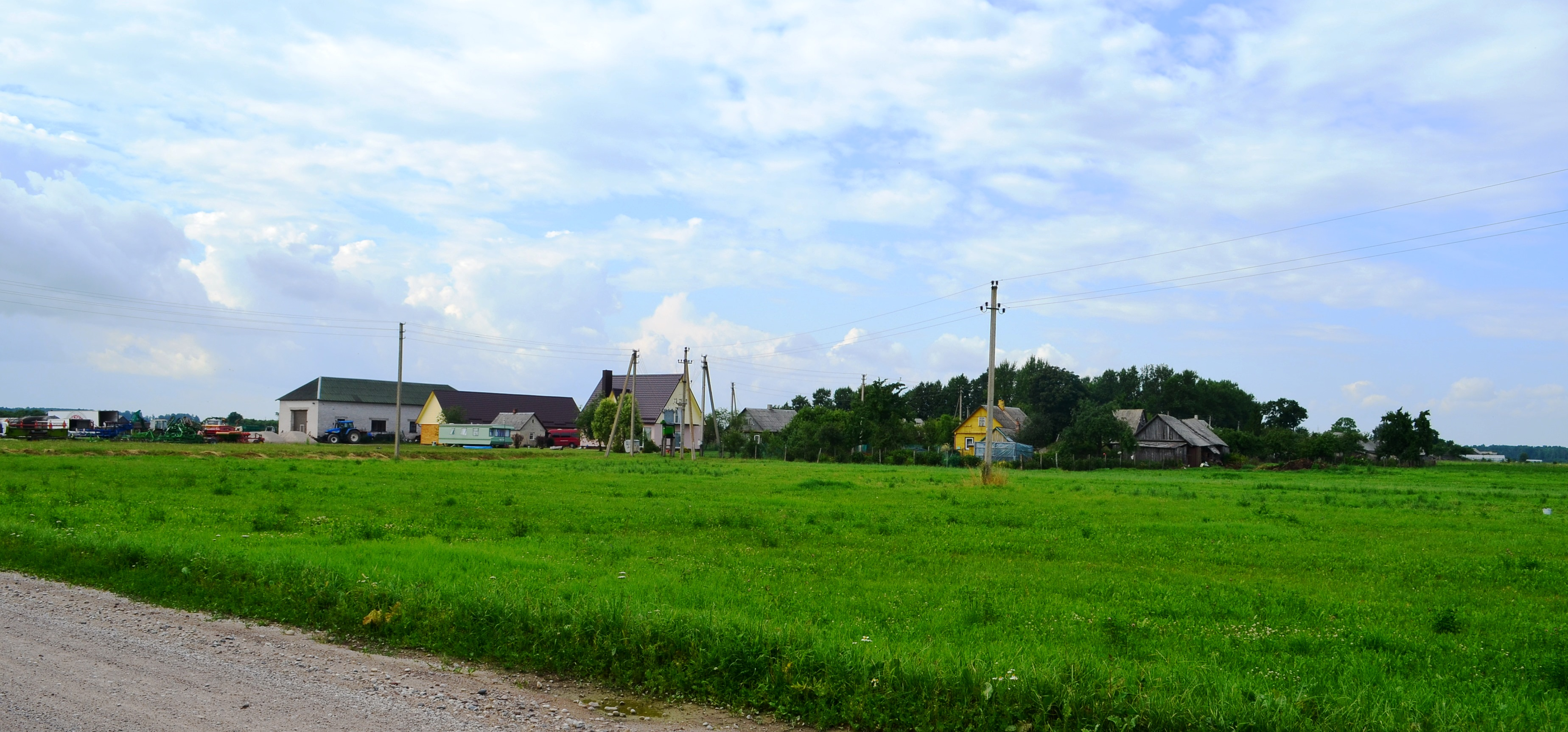
Vaidatoniai from the South

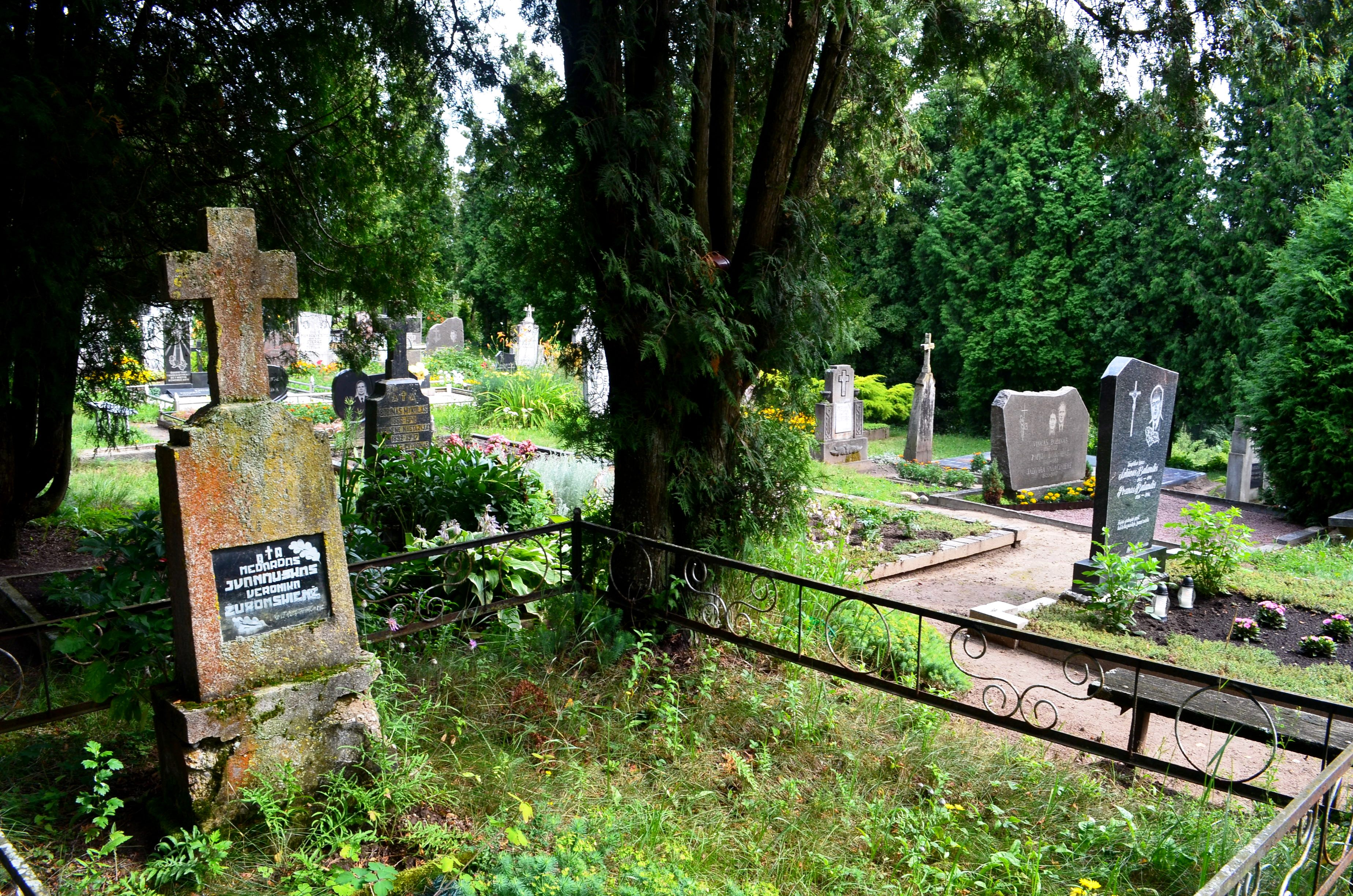
Vaidatoniai cemetery

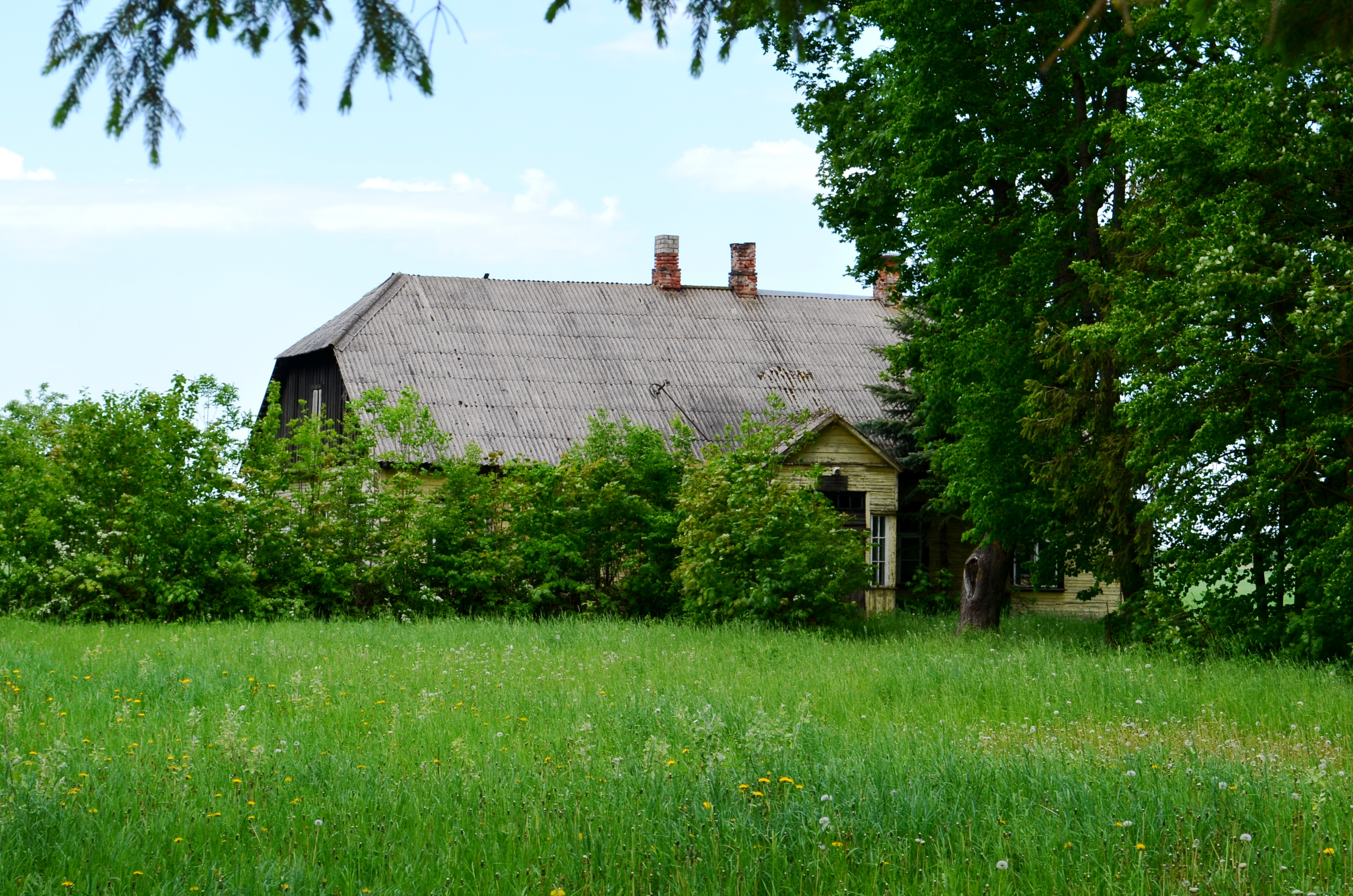
Former school

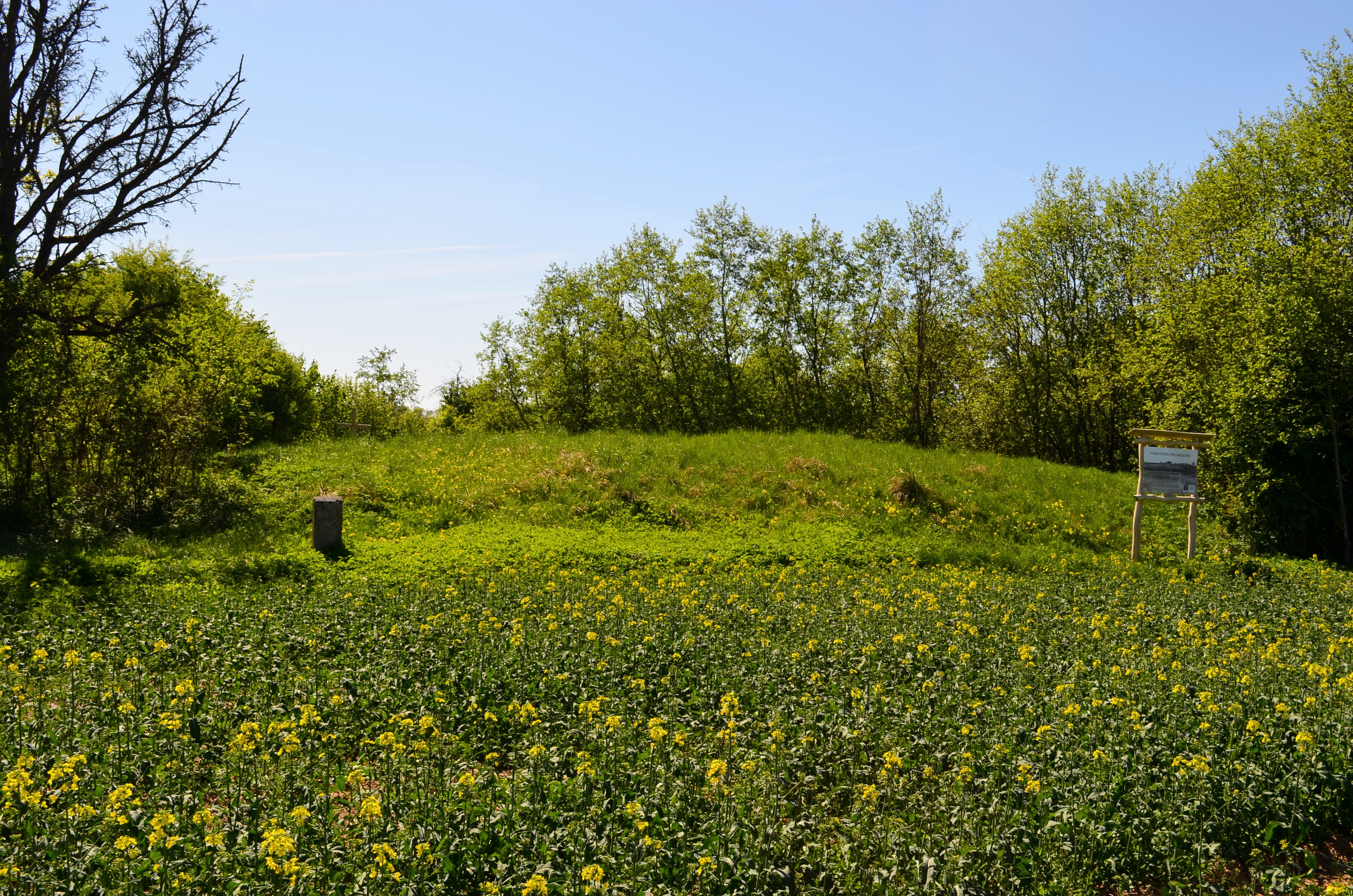
Vaidatoniai hillfort
