= Mociūnai =

- Village
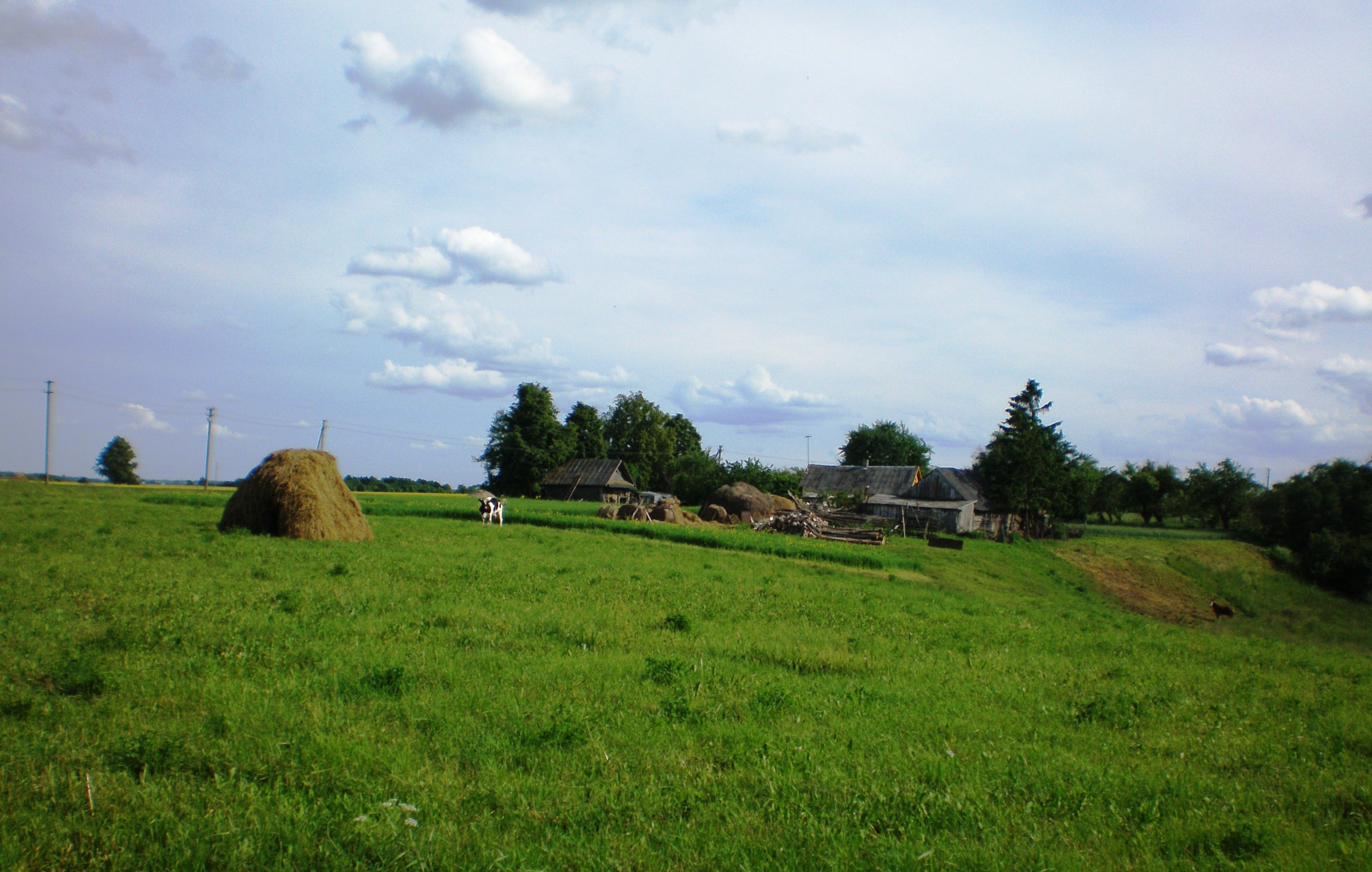

- Location in Lithuania
- Coordinates: 55°22′43″N 23°58′43″E
- Country: Lithuania
- County: Kaunas County
- Municipality: Kėdainiai district municipality
- Eldership: Surviliškis Eldership

Population (2011)
  - Total: 28
- Time zone: UTC+2 (EET)
  - Summer (DST): UTC+3 (EEST)

Mociūnai (formerly Polish: Maciuny, Russian: Мацюны) is a village in Kėdainiai district municipality, in Kaunas County, in central Lithuania. According to the 2011 census, the village had a population of 28 people. It is located 2.5 km from Kalnaberžė, by the deep valleys of Kruostas and Skaudinis rivers. There is an Old Believers cemetery in the village. Mociūnai Forest Botanical Sanctuary is located 2 km away from the village, in Kalnaberžė Forest.

== Demography ==
Historical population

Year	Pop.	±% p.a.
1902	110	—
1923	151	+1.52%
1959	106	−0.98%
1970	122	+1.29%

Year	Pop.	±% p.a.
1979	38	−12.16%
1989	26	−3.72%
2001	25	−0.33%
2011	28	+1.14%

Source: 1902, 1923, 1959 & 1970, 1979, 1989, 2001, 2011

== Images ==
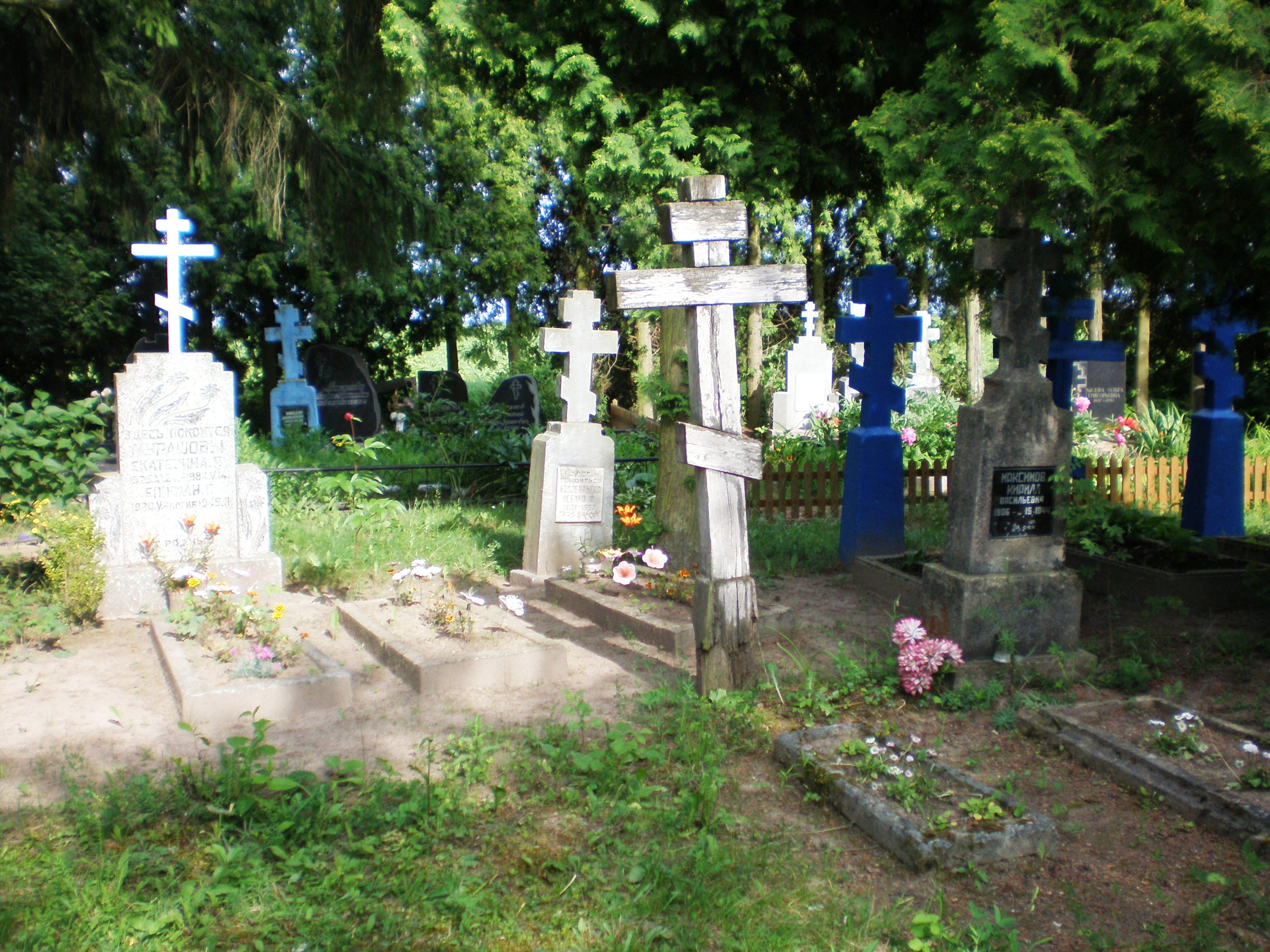
Old Believers cemetery

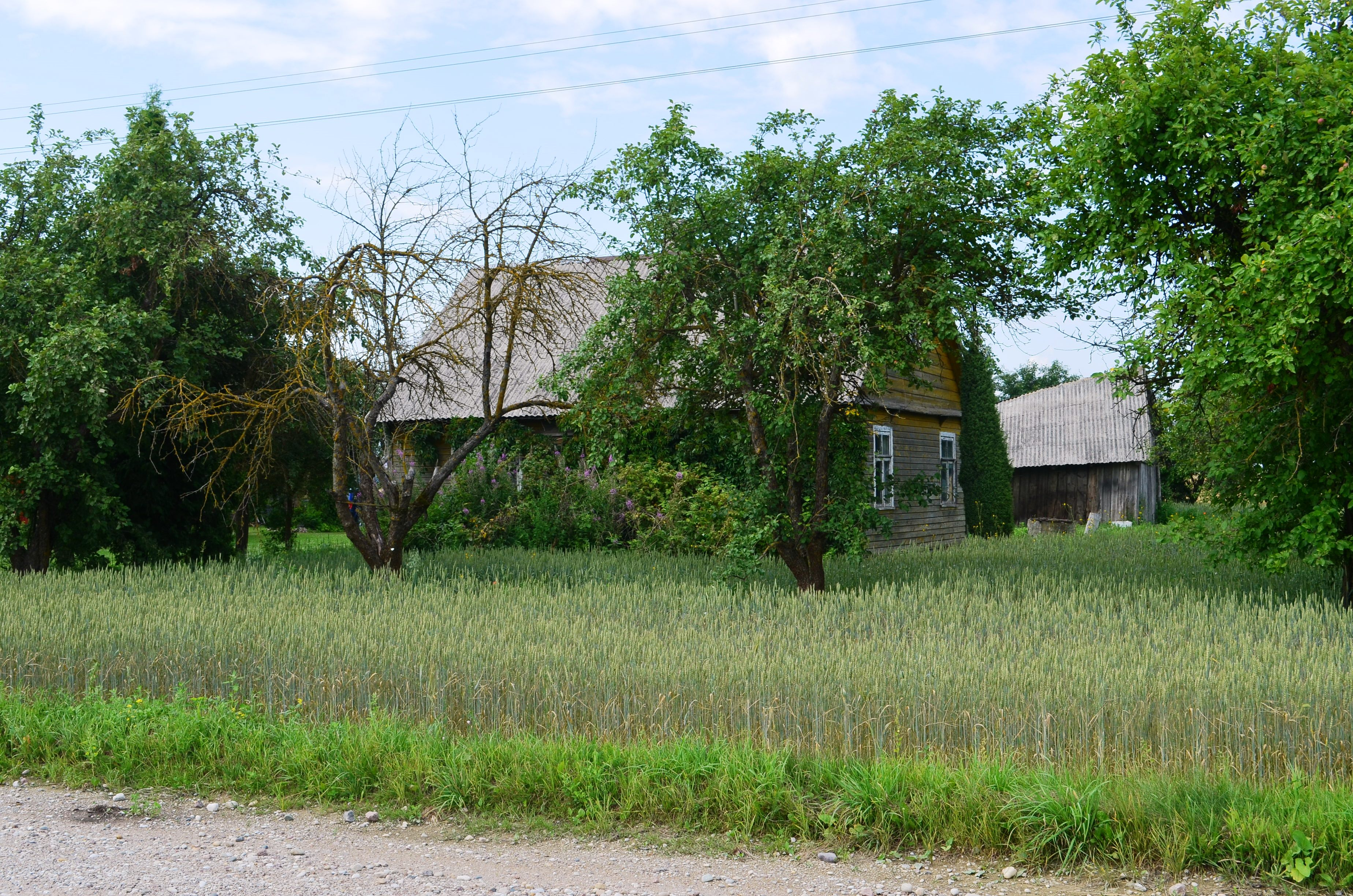
An abandoned house

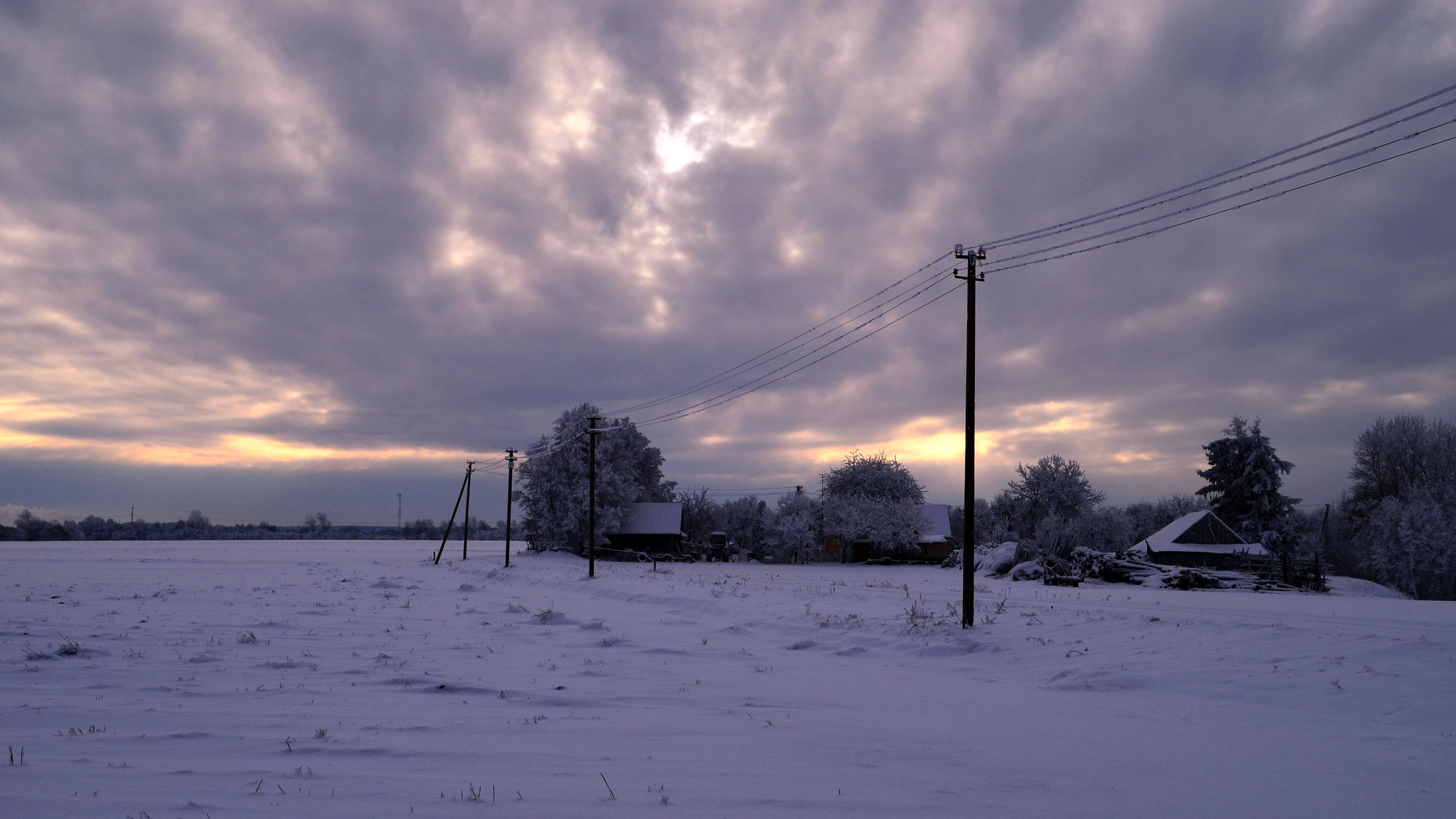
Mociūnai in winter
