= Dotnuva Manor =

Residential manor in Lithuania

Coordinates: 55°23′42″N 23°51′21″E

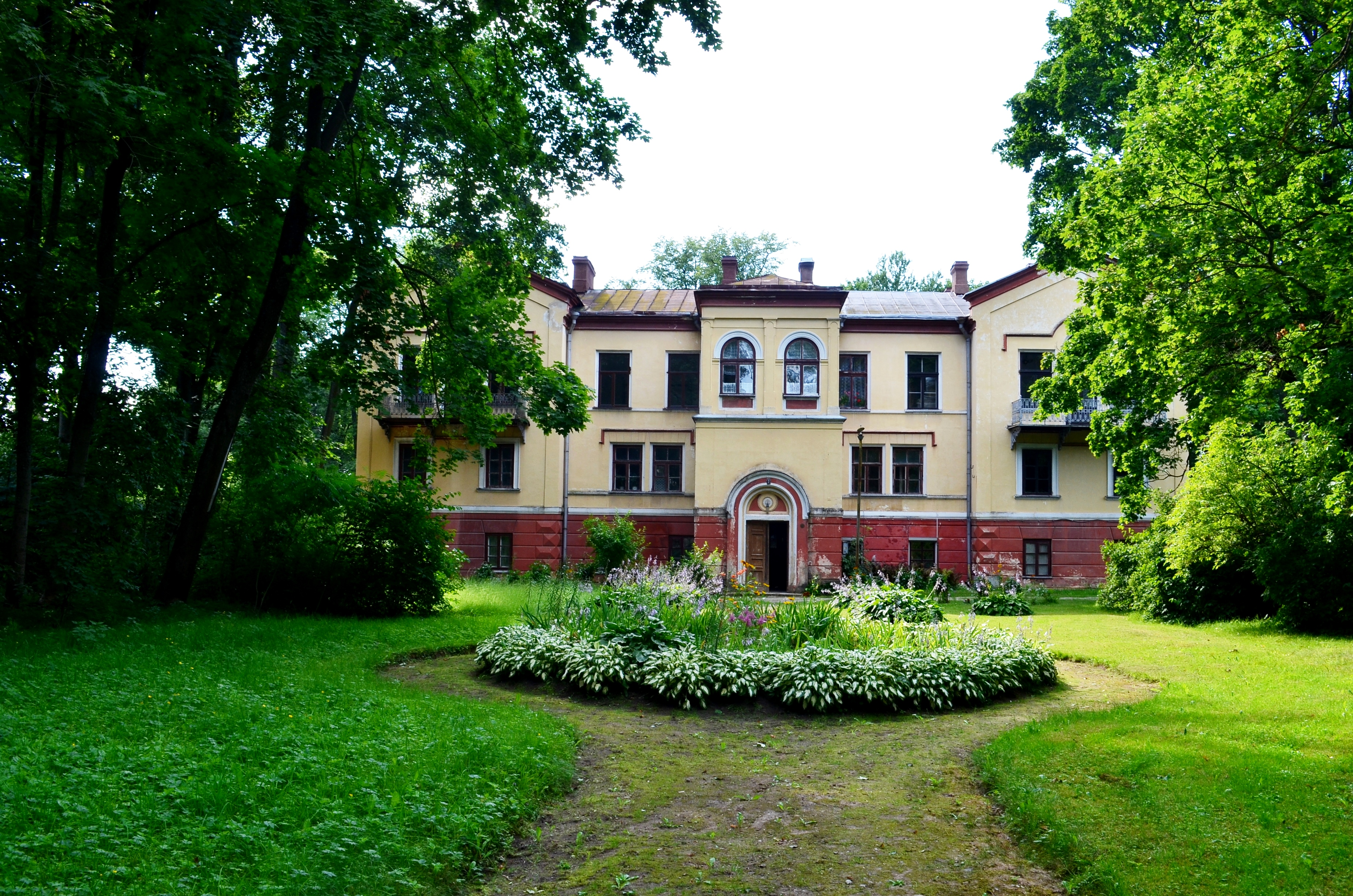
Dotnuva Manor (2010)

Dotnuva Manor (or Akademija Manor) is a former residential manor 3 kilometers from Dotnuva in Lithuania. Until 1945 it was a part of Agricultural Academy township.

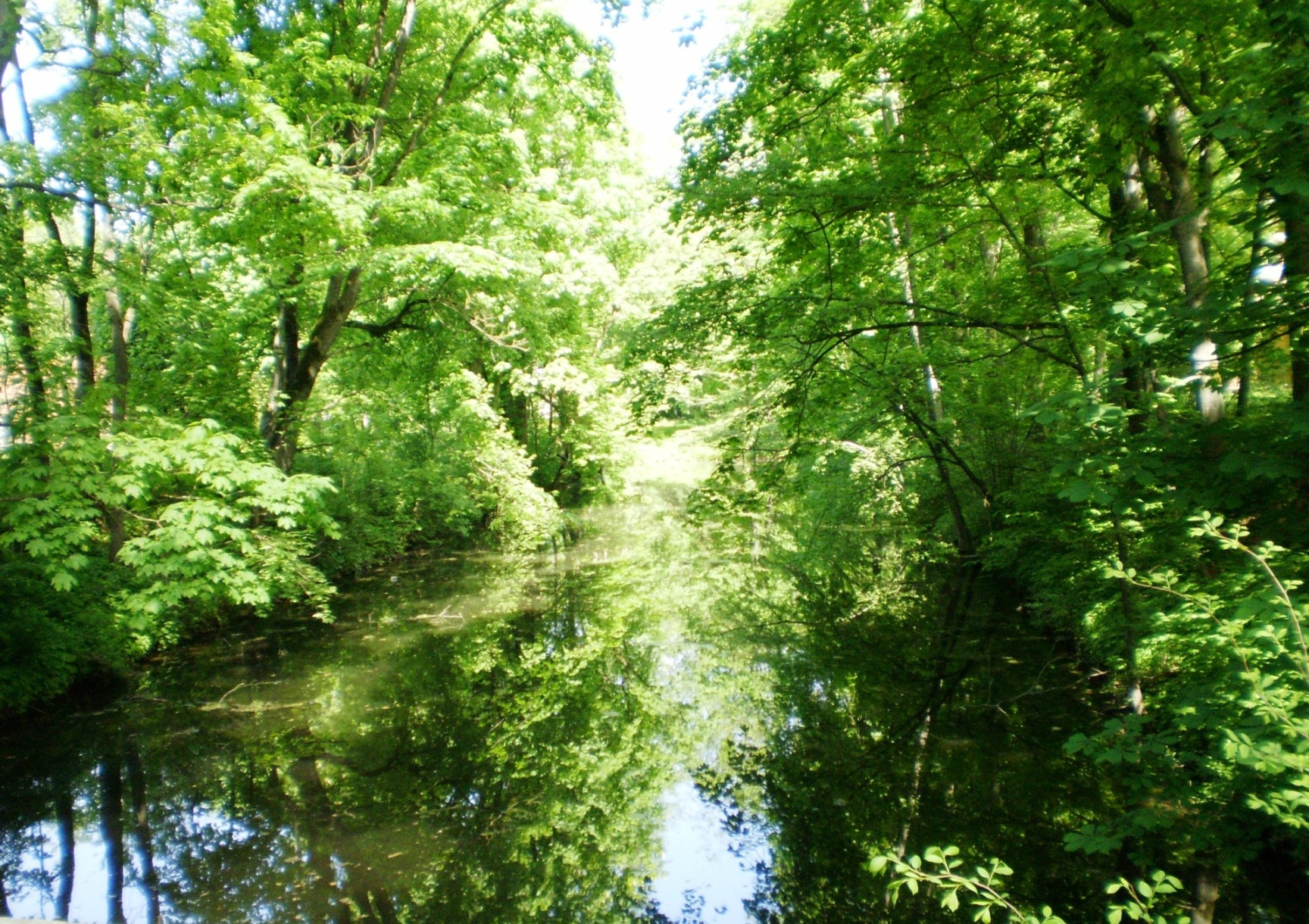
Dotnuva Manor park
