= Puodžiai, Kėdainiai =

Puodžiai
- Village
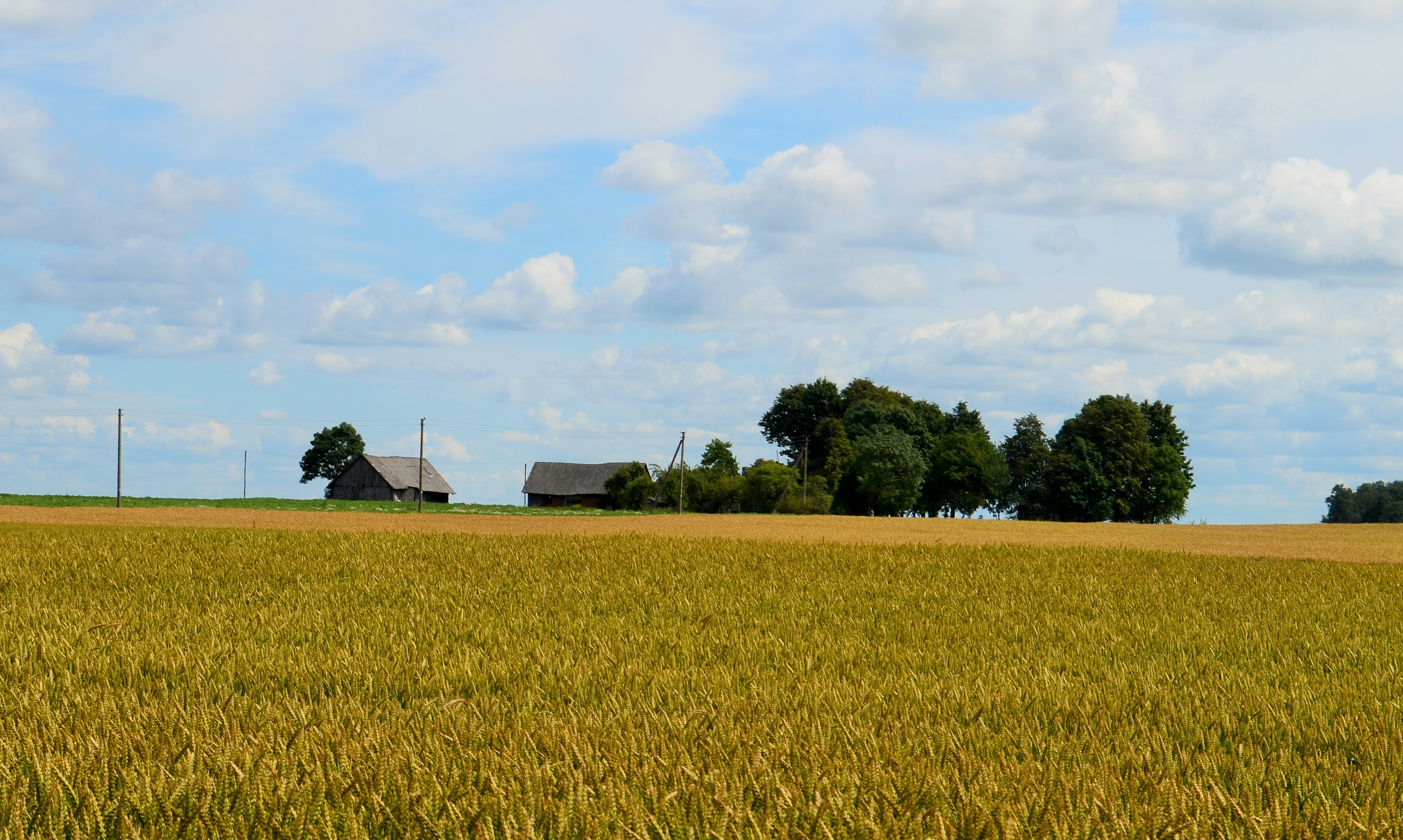

- Location in Lithuania
- Coordinates: 55°26′20″N 23°56′10″E
- Country: Lithuania
- County: Kaunas County
- Municipality: Kėdainiai district municipality
- Eldership: Dotnuva Eldership

Population (2011)
  - Total: 2
- Time zone: UTC+2 (EET)
  - Summer (DST): UTC+3 (EEST)

Puodžiai (formerly Russian: Подзи) is a village in Kėdainiai district municipality, in Kaunas County, in central Lithuania. According to the 2011 census, the village has a population of 2 people. It is located 2 km from Šlapaberžė.

== Demography ==
Historical population

Year	Pop.	±% p.a.
1902	72	—
1923	59	−0.94%
1959	41	−1.01%
1970	28	−3.41%

Year	Pop.	±% p.a.
1979	21	−3.15%
1989	11	−6.26%
2001	15	+2.62%
2011	2	−18.25%

Source: 1902, 1923, 1959 & 1970, 1979, 1989, 2001, 2011
