= Sirutiškis =

- Village
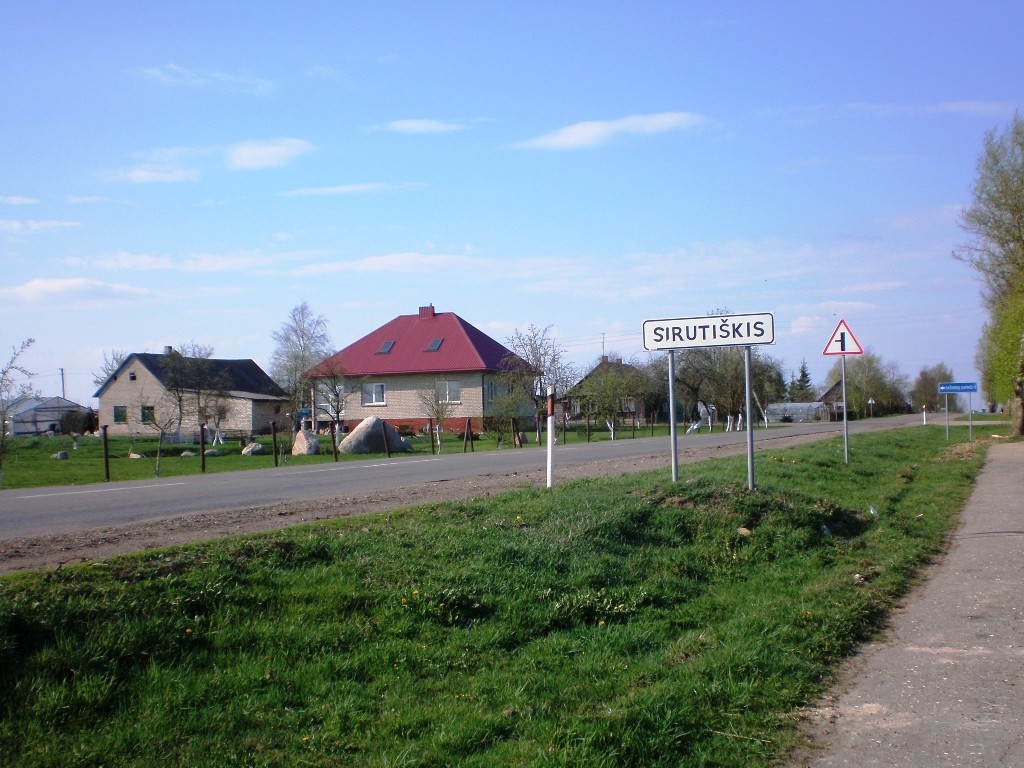

- Location in Lithuania Sirutiškis (Lithuania)
- Coordinates: 55°21′11″N 23°58′59″E
- Country: Lithuania
- County: Kaunas County
- Municipality: Kėdainiai district municipality
- Eldership: Surviliškis Eldership

Population (2011)
  - Total: 370
- Time zone: UTC+2 (EET)
  - Summer (DST): UTC+3 (EEST)

Sirutiškis is a village in Kėdainiai district municipality, in Kaunas County, in central Lithuania. According to the 2011 census, the village has a population of 370 people. It is located 1 km from the Kėdainiai city northern limit (Babėnai), on the right bank of the Nevėžis river, close to the mouth of its tributary the Baltupis. The regional road Kėdainiai-Krekenava-Panevėžys runs through the village.

There are a manor palace with a park, library, gravel pit in Sirutiškis.

== History ==
The name Sirutiškis comes from Simonas Sirutis, who was a castellan of Vitebsk and around 1760 had the Sirutiškis manor as an own property. At the 19th century, the manor was a property of the Komarowski family.

Beržytė village was merged with Sirutiškis in 1968.

== Demography ==
Historical population

Year	Pop.	±% p.a.
1923	265	—
1959	191	−0.91%
1970	372	+6.25%
1979	529	+3.99%

Year	Pop.	±% p.a.
1987	519	−0.24%
1989	413	−10.79%
2001	397	−0.33%
2011	370	−0.70%

Source: 1902, 1923, 1959 & 1970, 1979, 1989, 2001, 2011

== Images ==
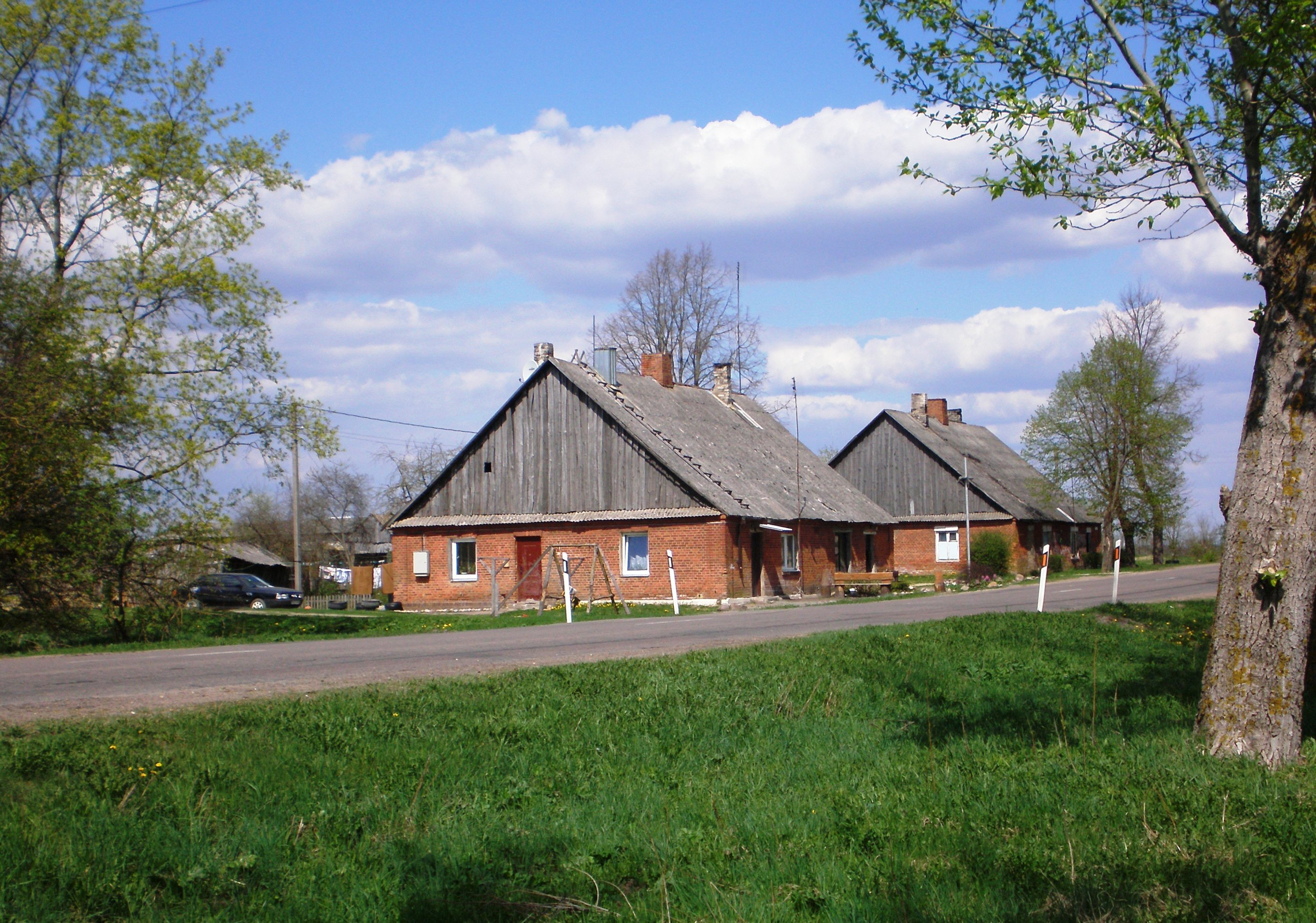
Former manor property in Sirutiškis

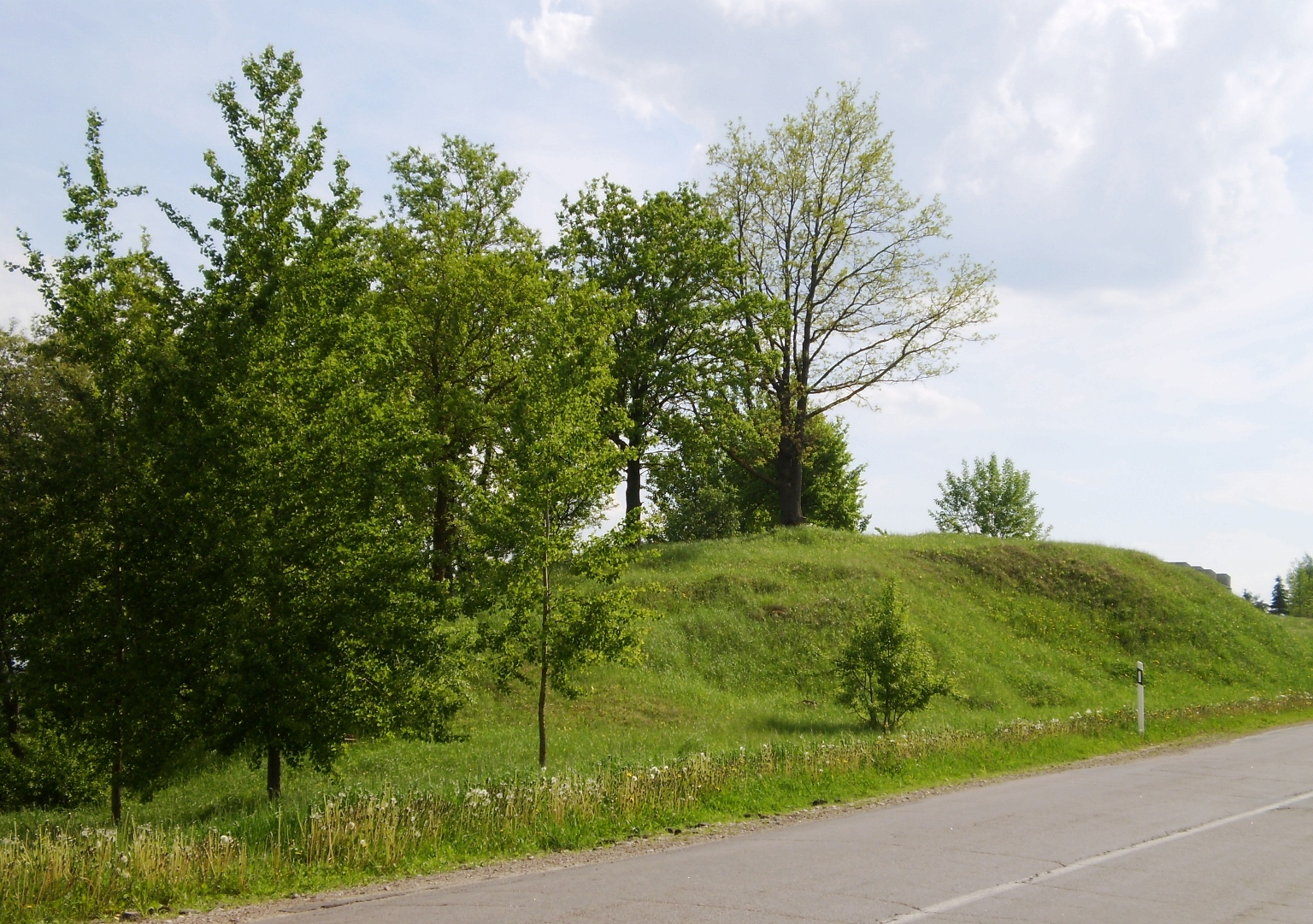
Kutiškiai ancient cemetery on the edge of Sirutiškis

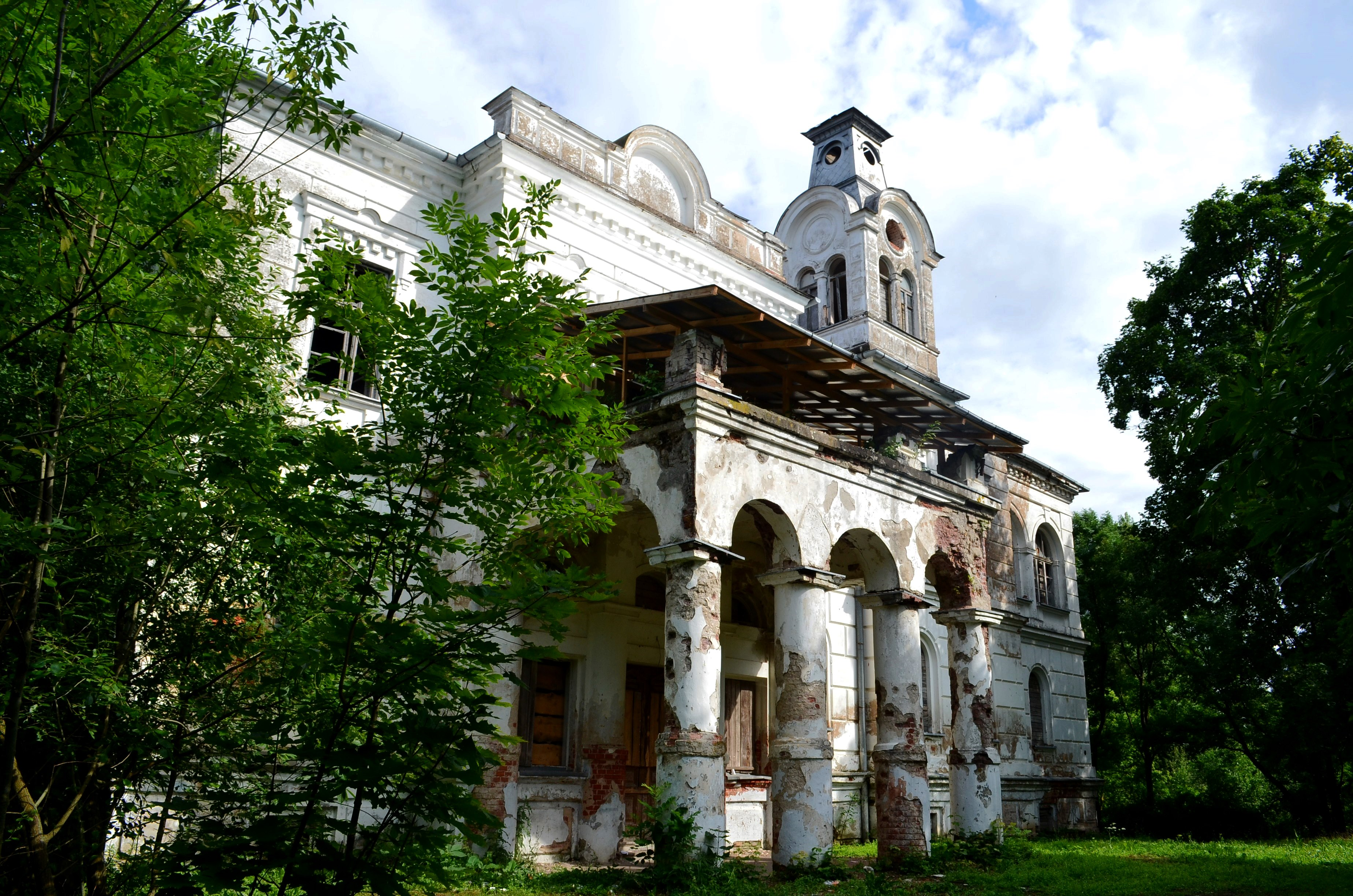
Sirutiškis manor
