= Kruostas =

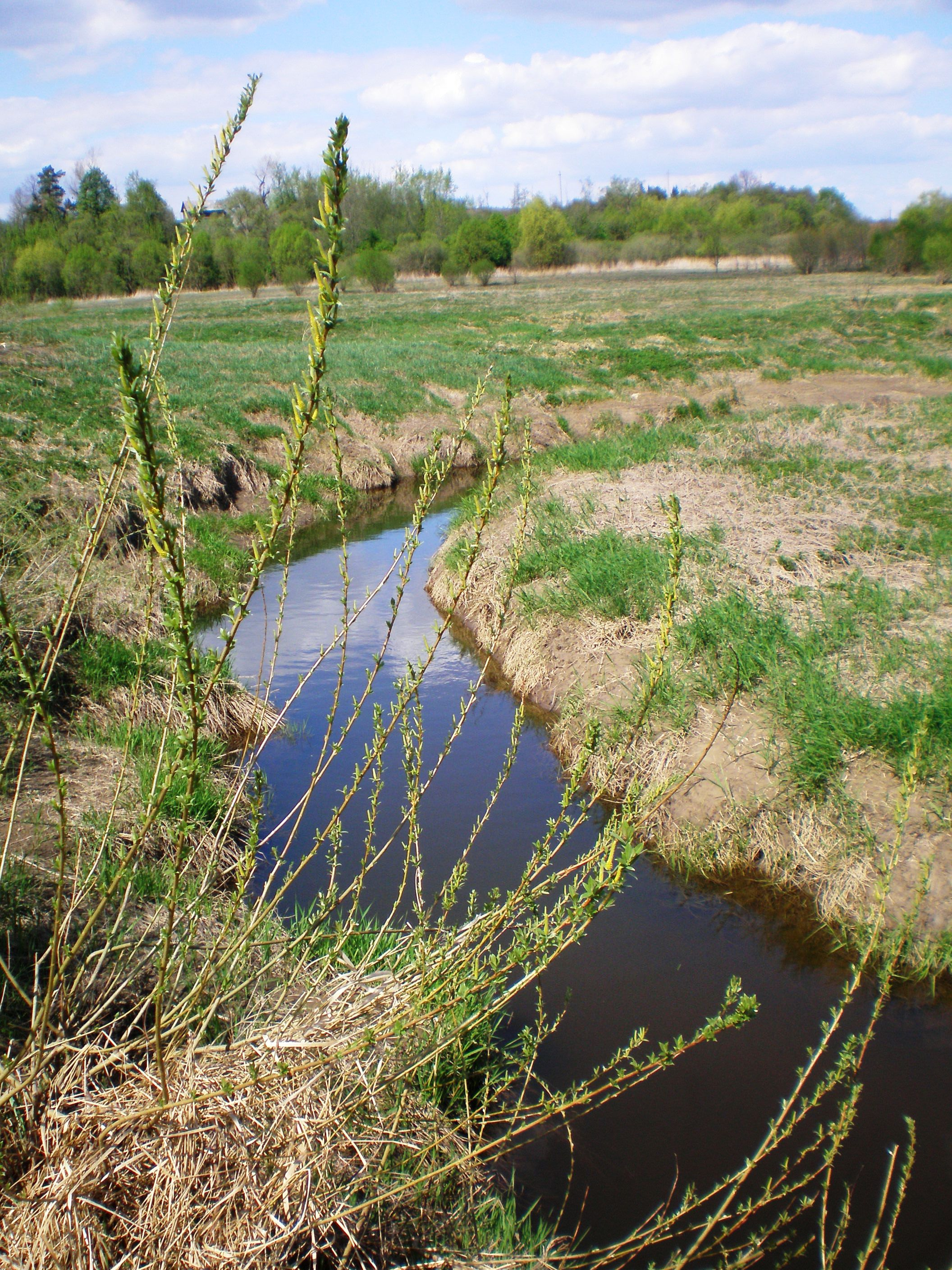

Location
- Country: Lithuania
- Region: Kėdainiai district municipality, Kaunas County

Physical characteristics
- Source
  - location: near Alksnėnai
- Mouth: Nevėžis in Urbeliai
  - coordinates: 55.3709°N 24.0077°E
- Length: 28.9 km (18.0 mi)
- Basin size: 99.7 km^{2} (38.5 sq mi)
- Discharge
  - average: 0.5 m³/s

Basin features
- Progression: Nevėžis→ Neman→ Baltic Sea
- Tributaries
  - left: Vinkšnupys, Žalčiupys, Suokupis, Alkas, Skaudinis, Latupys
  - right: Konkulis, Vensutis

The Kruostas is a river of Kėdainiai district municipality, Kaunas County, central Lithuania. It flows for 28.9 kilometres (18.0 mi) and has a basin area of 99.7 km^{2} (38.5 sq mi). It originates near Alksnėnai village and goes through agriculture fields passing the villages of Žilvičiai, Šlapaberžė, Beržai and Daškoniai. The lower course goes through a deep valley beside Vaidatoniai hillfort. This area is Kruostas botanic sanctuary. The river meets the Nevėžis from the right side near Urbeliai village. Vaidatoniai pond is on the Kruostas river.

The name Kruostas derives from Lithuanian word kruostas or skruostas ('cheek, eyelash, eyebrow'), further from skrosti, skersti ('to slice, to butcher').
