= Žilinskas =

- Lithuanian surname
- m.: Žilinskas
- f.: (unmarried): Žilinskaitė
- f.: (married): Žilinskienė

Žilinskas is a Lithuanian-language surname, most probably derived from Žilys. Its Slavic counterparts are Polish Żyliński, Russian Zhilinsky (Жилинский), and Belarusian Žylinski (Жылінскі).

Notable people with this surname include:

- Jonas Žilinskas (1888–1956), Lithuanian military officer
- Egidijus Žilinskas (born 1986), Lithuanian judoka
- Andrius Oleka-Žilinskas (1893–1948), Lithuanian actor, former director of Kaunas State Drama Theatre
- Annette Zilinskas (born 1962), American musician
- Jurga Žilinskienė MBE, (born 1976), British Lithuanian entrepreneur
- Nelė Žilinskienė (born 1969), Lithuanian high jumper
- Rokas Žilinskas (1972–2017), Lithuanian journalist and politician
- Victoria Zhilinskayte (born 1989), Russian handball player
- Vytautė Žilinskaitė (born 1930), Lithuanian writer
- Yana Zhilinskayte (born 1989), Russian handball player
