= Żyliński =

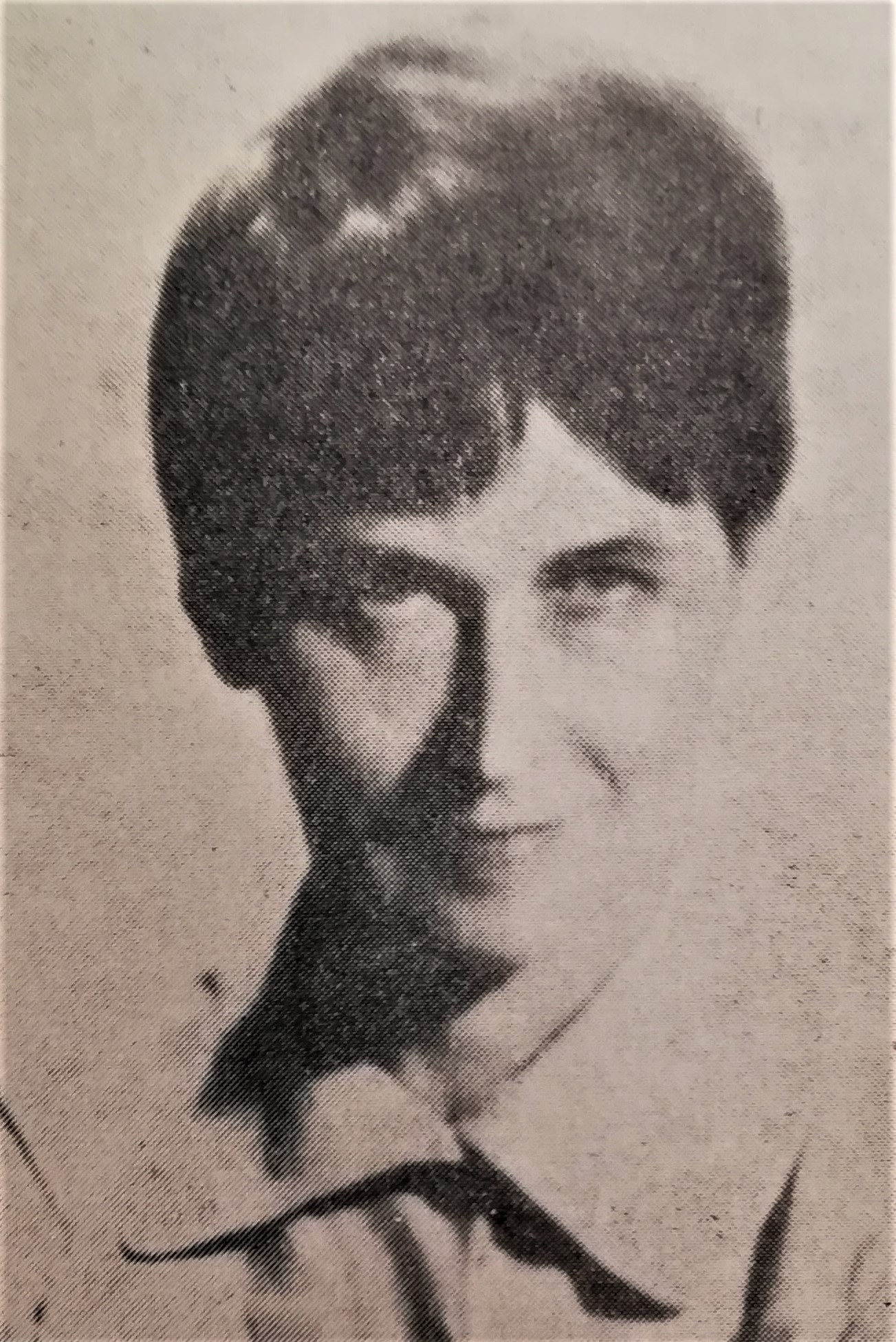
Jadwiga Żylińska

Żyliński (feminine: Żylińska) is a Polish-language surname. The Lithuanian-language form is Žilinskas. The Russian-language form is Zhilinsky. The noble Żyliński families belong to Polish, Lithuanian and Russian nobilities.

Notable people with this surname include:

- Jadwiga Żylińska, Polish author
- Joanna Żylińska, British writer and artist
- John Zylinski (1951–2024), UK-based Polish property developer, known for claiming to be a Polish prince and for founding a political party
- Marek Żyliński (1952–2024), Polish engineer and politician
- Tadeusz Żyliński, Polish engineer
