= November 4 =

November 4 this year in various calendars
- Wednesday, 4 November 2026
Akan	Kuruwukuo
Armenian	17 Trē 1476
Aztec	Atlcahualo 13, 13 Miquiztli
Babylonian	22 Tashritu, 2337 SE
Balinese pawukon	Luang, Pepet, Pasah, Menala, Keliwon, Paniron, Buda of Sinta, Yama, Dangu, Manuh
Bengali	19 Kartik, BS 1433
Chinese	Yang Water Horse・Three Stars Mansion; Fire Horse Year, Month 9, Day 26 (Shuangjiang, 3 days until Lidong)
Common Era	4 November 2026 CE
Coptic	25 Paopi, AM 1743
Egyptian	22 Phamenoth, 2775 NE
Ethiopian	25 Ṭeqemt, 2019 Amätä Məhrät
French Republican	Décade II, Tridi de Brumaire de l'Année 235 de la République
Gregorian	4 November, AD 2026
Hebrew	24 Cheshvan, AM 5787
Hindu	Pūrvaphalgunī・Brahman; Solar: 18 Kārtika, 1948 SE; Lunisolar: Daśamī, Kṛishna pakṣa of Āśvina, 2083 VE; Rāudra・5127 KY・1,872,883
Icelandic	Miðvikudagur, 12 Gormánuður 2026
Islamic	23 Jumada al-awwal, AH 1448 (using tabular method)
ISO week date	2026-W45-3
Japanese	25 Nagatsuki, Reiwa 8 (Sōkō, 3 days until Rittō)
Julian	22 October, AD 2026 (AM 7535)
Julian day	2461349
Korean	25 Gaedal, 4359 DE
Maya	13.0.14.1.6; 19 Zac, 13 Cimi
Roman	ante diem XI Kalendas Novembres, MMDCCLXXIX AUC
Solar Hijri	13 Aban, SH 1405
Tibetan	25 tha skar, me pho rta 2153 or 1772 or 1000

<<	November					>>
Su	Mo	Tu	We	Th	Fr	Sa
1	2	3	4	5	6	7
8	9	10	11	12	13	14
15	16	17	18	19	20	21
22	23	24	25	26	27	28
29	30
2026

November 4 is the 308th day of the year (309th in leap years) in the Gregorian calendar; 57 days remain until the end of the year.

November 4 in recent years
2026 (Wednesday)
2025 (Tuesday)
2024 (Monday)
2023 (Saturday)
2022 (Friday)
2021 (Thursday)
2020 (Wednesday)
2019 (Monday)
2018 (Sunday)
2017 (Saturday)

== Events ==
=== Pre-1600 ===
- 512 – Following Byzantine emperor Anastasius' deposition of Chalcedonian patriarchs and attempts to make Monophysite changes to liturgy, riots break out in Constantinople with a mob trying to proclaim Areobindus as emperor.
- 1354 – War of the Straits: The Genoese fleet under Paganino Doria defeats and captures the entire Venetian fleet under Niccolò Pisani at the Battle of Sapienza.
- 1429 – Armagnac–Burgundian Civil War: Joan of Arc liberates Saint-Pierre-le-Moûtier.
- 1493 – Christopher Columbus reaches the Leeward Islands.
- 1501 – Catherine of Aragon (later Henry VIII's first wife) meets Arthur, Prince of Wales, Henry VIII's older brother – they would later marry.
- 1576 – Eighty Years' War: In Flanders, Spain captures Antwerp (which is nearly destroyed after three days).

=== 1601–1900 ===
- 1677 – The future Mary II marries William, Prince of Orange; they later jointly reign over England, Scotland, and Ireland as William and Mary.
- 1737 – The Teatro di San Carlo, the oldest working opera house in Europe, is inaugurated in Naples, Italy.
- 1780 – The Rebellion of Túpac Amaru II against Spanish rule in the Viceroyalty of Peru begins.
- 1783 – Wolfgang Amadeus Mozart's Symphony No. 36 is performed for the first time in Linz, Austria.
- 1791 – Northwest Indian War: The Western Confederacy of American Indians wins a major victory over the United States in the Battle of the Wabash.
- 1798 – The Russo-Ottoman siege of Corfu begins.
- 1839 – Newport Rising: The last large-scale armed rebellion against authority in mainland Britain.
- 1847 – Sir James Young Simpson, a Scottish medical doctor, discovers the anaesthetic properties of chloroform.
- 1852 – Camillo Benso, Count of Cavour, becomes the prime minister of Piedmont-Sardinia, which soon expands to become Italy.
- 1864 – American Civil War: Confederate troops bombard a Union supply base and destroy millions of dollars in materiel at the Battle of Johnsonville.
- 1868 – Camagüey, Cuba, revolts against Spain during the Ten Years' War.
- 1890 – City and South London Railway: London's first deep-level tube railway opens between King William Street and Stockwell.

=== 1901–present ===
- 1918 – World War I: The Armistice of Villa Giusti between Italy and Austria-Hungary is implemented.
- 1921 – The Saalschutz Abteilung (hall defense detachment) of the Nazi Party is renamed the Sturmabteilung (storm detachment) after a large riot in Munich.
- 1921 – Japanese prime minister Hara Takashi is assassinated in Tokyo.
- 1922 – In Egypt, British archaeologist Howard Carter and his men find the entrance to Tutankhamun's tomb in the Valley of the Kings.
- 1924 – Nellie Tayloe Ross of Wyoming becomes the first female elected as governor in the United States.
- 1926 – Plot of Prats de Molló: French police aborted the attempt led by Francesc Macià to liberate Catalonia from the Spanish dictatorship of Primo de Rivera and proclaim the Catalan Republic.
- 1936 – Spanish Civil War: Largo Caballero reshuffles his war cabinet, persuading the anarcho-syndicalist CNT to join the government.
- 1939 – World War II: U.S. president Franklin D. Roosevelt orders the United States Customs Service to implement the Neutrality Act of 1939, allowing cash-and-carry purchases of weapons by belligerents.
- 1942 – World War II: Disobeying a direct order by Adolf Hitler, General Field Marshal Erwin Rommel begins a retreat of his forces after a costly defeat during the Second Battle of El Alamein. The retreat would ultimately last five months.
- 1944 – World War II: The 7th Macedonian Liberation Brigade liberates Bitola for the Allies.
- 1944 – World War II: Operation Pheasant, an Allied offensive to liberate North Brabant in the Netherlands, ends successfully.
- 1952 – The United States government establishes the National Security Agency, or NSA.
- 1956 – Soviet troops enter Hungary to end the Hungarian revolution against the Soviet Union that started on October 23. Thousands are killed, more are wounded, and nearly a quarter million leave the country.
- 1960 – At the Kasakela Chimpanzee Community in Tanzania, Jane Goodall observes chimpanzees creating tools, the first-ever observation in non-human animals.
- 1962 – The United States concludes Operation Fishbowl, its final above-ground nuclear weapons testing series, in anticipation of the 1963 Partial Nuclear Test Ban Treaty.
- 1966 – The Arno River floods Florence, Italy, to a maximum depth of 6.7 m (22 ft), leaving thousands homeless and destroying millions of masterpieces of art and rare books. Venice is also submerged on the same day at its record all-time acqua alta of 194 cm (76 in).
- 1967 – Iberia Flight 062 crashes in Blackdown, West Sussex, killing all 37 people on board including British actress June Thorburn.
- 1970 – Vietnam War: The United States turns over control of the air base at Bình Thủy in the Mekong Delta to South Vietnam.
- 1970 – Salvador Allende takes office as President of Chile, the first Marxist to become president of a Latin American country through open elections.
- 1973 – The Netherlands experiences the first car-free Sunday caused by the 1973 oil crisis. Highways are used only by cyclists and roller skaters.
- 1979 – Iran hostage crisis: A group of Iranian college students overruns the U.S. embassy in Tehran and takes 90 hostages.
- 1980 – Ronald Reagan is elected as the 40th President of the United States, defeating incumbent Jimmy Carter.
- 1993 – China Airlines Flight 605, a brand-new 747-400, overruns the runway at Hong Kong Kai Tak Airport.
- 1995 – Israel–Palestinian conflict: Israeli prime minister Yitzhak Rabin is assassinated by Yigal Amir, an extremist Israeli.
- 2002 – Chinese authorities arrest cyber-dissident He Depu for signing a pro-democracy letter to the 16th Communist Party Congress.
- 2008 – Barack Obama becomes the first person of biracial or African-American descent to be elected as President of the United States.
- 2010 – Aero Caribbean Flight 883 crashes into Guasimal, Sancti Spíritus; all 68 passengers and crew are killed.
- 2010 – Qantas Flight 32, an Airbus A380, suffers an uncontained engine failure over Indonesia shortly after taking off from Singapore, crippling the jet. The crew manage to safely return to Singapore, saving all 469 passengers and crew.
- 2015 – A cargo plane crashes shortly after takeoff from Juba International Airport in Juba, South Sudan, killing at least 37 people.
- 2015 – A building collapses in the Pakistani city of Lahore resulting in at least 45 deaths and at least 100 injuries.
- 2020 – The Tigray War begins with Tigrayan rebels launching attacks on Ethiopian command centers.
- 2022 – The Khash massacre, which refers to the repression of protesters by Iranian security forces, resulting in 18 deaths and more than 20 injuries.
- 2025 – UPS Airlines Flight 2976, a McDonnell Douglas MD-11F crashes into multiple buildings during takeoff at Louisville Muhammad Ali International Airport in Louisville, Kentucky, killing 15 people, including the 3 crew members.

== Births ==
=== Pre-1600 ===
- 1448 – Alfonso II of Naples (died 1495)
- 1512 – Hu Zongxian, Chinese general (died 1565)
- 1553 – Roger Wilbraham, Solicitor-General for Ireland (died 1616)
- 1575 – Guido Reni, Italian painter and illustrator (died 1642)
- 1592 – Gerard van Honthorst, Dutch painter (died 1656)

=== 1601–1900 ===
- 1631 – Mary, Princess Royal and Princess of Orange (died 1660)
- 1640 – Carlo Mannelli, Italian violinist and composer (died 1697)
- 1649 – Samuel Carpenter, Deputy Governor of colonial Pennsylvania (died 1714)
- 1661 – Charles III Philip, Elector Palatine, German son of Landgravine Elisabeth Amalie of Hesse-Darmstadt (died 1742)
- 1740 – Augustus Toplady, English cleric and hymn writer (died 1778)
- 1765 – Pierre-Simon Girard, French mathematician and engineer (died 1836)
- 1787 – Edmund Kean, British Shakespearean stage actor (died 1833)
- 1809 – Benjamin Robbins Curtis, American lawyer and jurist (died 1874)
- 1816 – Stephen Johnson Field, American lawyer and jurist, 5th Chief Justice of California (died 1899)
- 1821 – Thomas Keefer, Canadian engineer and businessman (died 1915)
- 1836 – Henry J. Lutcher, American businessman (died 1912)
- 1840 – William Giblin, Australian politician, 13th Premier of Tasmania (died 1887)
- 1853 – Anna Bayerová, Czech medical doctor (died 1924)
- 1861 – Alice Gossage, American journalist (died 1929)
- 1862 – Rasmus Rasmussen, Norwegian actor and director (died 1932)
- 1868 – La Belle Otero, Spanish actress, singer, and dancer (died 1965)
- 1873 – Kyōka Izumi, Japanese author, poet, and playwright (died 1939)
- 1874 – Charles Despiau, French sculptor (died 1946)
- 1879 – Will Rogers, American actor and screenwriter (died 1935)
- 1883 – Nikolaos Plastiras, Greek general and politician 135th Prime Minister of Greece (died 1953)
- 1884 – Harry Ferguson, Irish engineer, invented the tractor (died 1960)
- 1887 – Alfred Lee Loomis, American physicist and philanthropist (died 1975)
- 1889 – Alton Adams, American composer and bandleader (died 1987)
- 1890 – Klabund, German author and poet (died 1928)
- 1896 – Carlos P. Garcia, Filipino lawyer and politician, 8th President of the Philippines (died 1971)
- 1897 – Dolly Stark, American baseball player and umpire (died 1968)
- 1900 – Lucrețiu Pătrășcanu, Romanian sociologist and activist (died 1954)

=== 1901–present ===
- 1901 – Spyridon Marinatos, Greek archaeologist, author, and academic (died 1974)
- 1904 – Tadeusz Żyliński, Polish engineer, technician, and academic (died 1967)
- 1905 – Dragutin Tadijanović, Croatian poet and translator (died 2007)
- 1906 – Sterling North, American author and critic (died 1974)
- 1908 – Stanley Cortez, American cinematographer and photographer (died 1997)
- 1908 – Joseph Rotblat, Polish-English physicist and academic, Nobel Prize laureate (died 2005)
- 1909 – Evelyn Bryan Johnson, American colonel and pilot (died 2012)
- 1909 – Bert Patenaude, American soccer player (died 1974)
- 1909 – Skeeter Webb, American baseball player and manager (died 1986)
- 1911 – Violet Biever, American politician (died 2010)
- 1911 – Dixie Lee, American actress and singer (died 1952)
- 1912 – Botong Francisco, Filipino painter (died 1969)
- 1912 – Vadim Salmanov, Russian pianist and composer (died 1978)
- 1912 – Giff Vivian, New Zealand cricketer (died 1983)
- 1913 – Gig Young, American actor (died 1978)
- 1914 – Carlos Castillo Armas, Authoritarian ruler of Guatemala (died 1957)
- 1915 – Marguerite Patten, English economist and author (died 2015)
- 1915 – Ismail Abdul Rahman, Malaysian politician (died 1973)
- 1916 – John Basilone, American sergeant, Medal of Honor recipient (died 1945)
- 1916 – Walter Cronkite, American journalist, voice actor, and producer (died 2009)
- 1916 – Ruth Handler, American businesswoman, created Barbie (died 2002)
- 1918 – Art Carney, American actor (died 2003)
- 1918 – Cameron Mitchell, American actor (died 1994)
- 1919 – Martin Balsam, American actor, director, and screenwriter (died 1996)
- 1919 – Eric Thompson, English race car driver and businessman (died 2015)
- 1921 – Mary Sherman Morgan, American scientist and engineer (died 2004)
- 1922 – Benno Besson, Swiss-German actor, director, and screenwriter (died 2006)
- 1923 – Freddy Heineken, Dutch businessman (died 2002)
- 1923 – Howie Meeker, Canadian ice hockey player, coach, and politician (died 2020)
- 1923 – Eugene Sledge, American soldier, author, and academic (died 2001)
- 1925 – Gamani Corea, Sri Lankan economist and diplomat (died 2013)
- 1925 – Doris Roberts, American actress (died 2016)
- 1926 – Carlos "Patato" Valdes, Cuban-American conga player and composer (died 2007)
- 1928 – Larry Bunker, American drummer and vibraphone player (died 2005)
- 1928 – Eugenio Lopez Jr., Filipino businessman and chairman of the ABS-CBN Broadcasting Corporation (died 1999)
- 1928 – Hannah Weiner, American poet and author (died 1997)
- 1929 – Anastasios of Albania, Greek-Albanian archbishop (died 2025)
- 1929 – Shakuntala Devi, Indian mathematician and astrologer (died 2013)
- 1930 – James E. Brewton, American painter (died 1967)
- 1930 – Ranjit Roy Chaudhury, Indian pharmacologist and academic (died 2015)
- 1930 – Dick Groat, American baseball player and sportscaster (died 2023)
- 1930 – Frank J. Prial, American journalist and author (died 2012)
- 1931 – Bernard Francis Law, Mexican-American cardinal (died 2017)
- 1932 – Thomas Klestil, Austrian politician and diplomat, 10th President of Austria (died 2004)
- 1932 – Tommy Makem, Irish singer-songwriter (died 2007)
- 1933 – Tito Francona, American baseball player (died 2018)
- 1933 – Charles K. Kao, Chinese physicist and engineer, Nobel Prize laureate (died 2018)
- 1933 – C. Odumegwu Ojukwu, Nigerian colonel and politician, President of Biafra (died 2011)
- 1935 – Barry Crocker, Australian singer, actor, and television host
- 1935 – Elgar Howarth, English conductor and composer (died 2025)
- 1936 – C. K. Williams, American poet, critic, and translator (died 2015)
- 1937 – Loretta Swit, American actress and singer (died 2025)
- 1937 – Michael Wilson, Canadian academic and politician, 31st Canadian Minister of Finance (died 2019)
- 1939 – Gail E. Haley, American author and illustrator
- 1939 – Michael Meacher, English academic and politician, Secretary of State for the Environment, Transport and the Regions (died 2015)
- 1940 – Sally Baldwin, Scottish social sciences professor (died 2003)
- 1940 – Marlène Jobert, French actress, singer, and author
- 1940 – Delbert McClinton, American singer-songwriter
- 1941 – Kafi Benz, American conservationist, environmentalist, historic preservationist, author, artist, community leader
- 1941 – Lyndall Gordon, South African-English author and academic
- 1942 – Patricia Bath, American ophthalmologist and academic (died 2019)
- 1943 – Clark Graebner, American tennis player
- 1943 – Bob Wollek, French race car driver and skier (died 2001)
- 1946 – Laura Bush, American educator and librarian, 45th First Lady of the United States
- 1946 – Frederick Elmes, American cinematographer
- 1946 – Robert Mapplethorpe, American photographer (died 1989)
- 1947 – Ivonne Coll, Puerto Rican actress
- 1947 – Jerry Fleck, American actor, director, and production manager (died 2003)
- 1947 – Rod Marsh, Australian cricketer and coach (died 2022)
- 1947 – Ali Özgentürk, Turkish director, producer, and screenwriter (died 2025)
- 1947 – Alexei Ulanov, Russian figure skater
- 1947 – Ludmila Velikova, Russian figure skater and coach
- 1948 – Alexis Hunter, New Zealand-English painter and photographer (died 2014)
- 1948 – Amadou Toumani Touré, Malian soldier and politician, President of Mali (died 2020)
- 1949 – Garo Aida, Japanese photographer and author
- 1950 – Charles Frazier, American novelist
- 1950 – Markie Post, American actress (died 2021)
- 1950 – Nik Powell, English businessman, co-founded Virgin Group (died 2019)
- 1951 – Traian Băsescu, Romanian captain and politician, 4th President of Romania
- 1952 – Pope Tawadros II of Alexandria
- 1953 – Mick Buckley, English footballer (died 2013)
- 1953 – P. J. Carey, American baseball player and manager (died 2012)
- 1953 – Carlos Gutierrez, Cuban-American businessman and politician, 35th United States Secretary of Commerce
- 1953 – Peter Lord, English animator, director, and producer, co-founded Aardman Animations
- 1953 – Van Stephenson, American singer-songwriter and guitarist (died 2001)
- 1953 – Jacques Villeneuve, Canadian race car driver
- 1954 – Chris Difford, English singer-songwriter, guitarist, and producer
- 1955 – Alhaj Moulana Ghousavi Shah, Indian author, poet, and scholar
- 1955 – Matti Vanhanen, Finnish journalist and politician, 40th Prime Minister of Finland
- 1956 – Tom Greenhalgh, Swedish singer-songwriter
- 1956 – James Honeyman-Scott, English guitarist and songwriter (died 1982)
- 1956 – Jordan Rudess, American keyboard player and songwriter
- 1957 – Tony Abbott, English-Australian scholar and politician, 28th Prime Minister of Australia
- 1957 – Richard Harrington, English businessman and politician
- 1957 – Aleksandr Tkachyov, Russian gymnast and coach
- 1958 – Lee Jasper, English activist and politician
- 1958 – Anne Sweeney, American businesswoman
- 1959 – Ken Kirzinger, Canadian actor and stuntman
- 1960 – Marc Awodey, American painter and poet (died 2012)
- 1960 – Kathy Griffin, American comedian and actress
- 1960 – Igor Liba, Slovak ice hockey player
- 1961 – Daron Hagen, American pianist, composer, and conductor
- 1961 – Edward Knight, American composer and academic
- 1961 – Ralph Macchio, American actor
- 1961 – Jeff Probst, American television host and producer
- 1961 – Steve Rotheram, English politician, Lord Mayor of Liverpool
- 1961 – Nigel Worthington, Northern Irish footballer and manager
- 1962 – Arvo Volmer, Estonian conductor
- 1963 – Marc Déry, Canadian singer and guitarist
- 1963 – Michel Therrien, Canadian ice hockey player and coach
- 1963 – Lena Zavaroni, Scottish singer and television host (died 1999)
- 1964 – Yūko Mizutani, Japanese voice actress and singer (died 2016)
- 1965 – Wayne Static, American singer-songwriter and guitarist (died 2014)
- 1967 – Daisuke Asakura, Japanese songwriter and producer
- 1967 – Yılmaz Erdoğan, Turkish actor, director, and screenwriter
- 1967 – Karin Greiner, Austrian politician
- 1967 – Eric Karros, American baseball player and sportscaster
- 1967 – Asif Mujtaba, Pakistani cricketer
- 1968 – Matthew Tobin Anderson, American author, critic, and educator
- 1968 – Carlos Baerga, Puerto Rican baseball player and coach
- 1968 – Lee Germon, New Zealand cricketer
- 1969 – Sean Combs, American rapper, producer, and actor
- 1969 – Matthew McConaughey, American actor and producer
- 1969 – Samantha Smith, American actress
- 1970 – Tim DeBoom, American triathlete
- 1970 – Malena Ernman, Swedish soprano
- 1970 – Anthony Ruivivar, American actor
- 1970 – Tony Sly, American singer-songwriter and guitarist (died 2012)
- 1971 – Gregory Porter, American jazz singer-songwriter and actor
- 1971 – Tabu, Indian actress
- 1972 – Luís Figo, Portuguese footballer and sportscaster
- 1973 – Steven Ogg, Canadian actor
- 1975 – Éric Fichaud, Canadian ice hockey player
- 1975 – Eduard Koksharov, Russian handball player (died 2026)
- 1975 – Mikki Moore, American basketball player
- 1975 – Orlando Pace, American football player
- 1975 – Heather Tom, American actress and director
- 1975 – Lorenzen Wright, American basketball player (died 2010)
- 1976 – Daniel Bahr, German banker and politician, German Federal Minister of Health
- 1976 – Bruno Junqueira, Brazilian race car driver
- 1976 – Mario Melchiot, Dutch footballer
- 1976 – Kenji Osawa, Japanese mixed martial artist
- 1976 – James Dale Ritchie, American serial killer (died 2016)
- 1976 – Makoto Tamada, Japanese motorcycle racer
- 1976 – Peter Van Houdt, Belgian footballer
- 1977 – Larry Bigbie, American baseball player
- 1978 – John Grabow, American baseball player
- 1980 – Jerry Collins, Samoan-New Zealand rugby player (died 2015)
- 1980 – Richard Owens, American football player and coach
- 1980 – Emme Rylan, American actress
- 1980 – Dan Stoenescu, Romanian career diplomat, political scientist, journalist, and essayist
- 1981 – Guy Martin, English motorcycle racer
- 1981 – Vince Wilfork, American football player
- 1982 – Devin Hester, American football player
- 1982 – Kamila Skolimowska, Polish hammer thrower (died 2009)
- 1983 – Anton Buslov, Russian astrophysicist and journalist (died 2014)
- 1984 – Dustin Brown, American ice hockey player
- 1984 – Ayila Yussuf, Nigerian footballer
- 1985 – Marcell Jansen, German footballer
- 1985 – Miki Miyamura, Japanese tennis player
- 1986 – Suhas Gopinath, Indian businessman
- 1986 – Alexz Johnson, Canadian actress and singer-songwriter
- 1986 – Szymon Pawłowski, Polish footballer
- 1986 – Adrian Zaugg, South African race car driver
- 1987 – Tim Breukers, Dutch footballer
- 1987 – Laura Geitz, Australian netball player
- 1987 – Artur Jędrzejczyk, Polish footballer
- 1988 – Dez Bryant, American football player
- 1988 – David Mead, Papua New Guinean rugby league player
- 1988 – Nathan Ross, Australian rugby league player
- 1990 – Jean-Luc Bilodeau, Canadian actor
- 1991 – Alon Day, Israeli race car driver
- 1991 – Lesley Pattinama Kerkhove, Dutch tennis player
- 1992 – Yurii Bieliaiev, Belarusian ice dancer
- 1992 – Hiroki Nakada, Japanese footballer
- 1992 – Julian Wießmeier, German footballer
- 1993 – Ce'Aira Brown, American middle-distance runner
- 1993 – Elisabeth Seitz, German gymnast
- 1993 – Taylor Tomlinson, American stand-up comedian
- 1994 – Billy Stanlake, Australian cricketer
- 1996 – Kaitlin Hawayek, American ice dancer
- 1996 – Michael Christian Martinez, Filipino figure skater
- 1996 – John Olive, Australian rugby league player
- 1996 – Eric Paschall, American basketball player
- 1998 – Achraf Hakimi, Moroccan footballer
- 1999 – Emma Maltais, Canadian ice hockey player
- 2000 – Tyrese Maxey, American basketball player
- 2000 – Sun Yingsha, Chinese table tennis player
- 2006 – Darja Varfolomeev, Russian-German rhythmic gymnast

== Deaths ==
=== Pre-1600 ===
- 604 – Yohl Ik'nal, Mayan queen
- 915 – Zhang, Chinese empress (born 892)
- 1038 – Jaromír, duke of Bohemia (born 970)
- 1203 – Dirk VII, Count of Holland
- 1212 – Felix of Valois, French saint (born 1127)
- 1360 – Elizabeth de Clare, English noblewoman (born 1295)
- 1411 – Khalil Sultan of Timurid (born 1384)
- 1428 – Sophia of Bavaria, queen of Bohemia (born 1376)
- 1485 – Françoise d'Amboise, duchess of Brittany (born 1427)
- 1485 – Giovanni Mocenigo, Doge of Venice (born 1408)
- 1576 – John Paulet, 2nd Marquess of Winchester (born c. 1510)
- 1581 – Mathurin Romegas, rival Grandmaster of the Knights Hospitaller (born c.1525)

=== 1601–1900 ===
- 1652 – Jean-Charles della Faille, Flemish priest and mathematician (born 1597)
- 1658 – Antoine Le Maistre, French lawyer and author (born 1608)
- 1669 – Johannes Cocceius, Dutch theologian and academic (born 1603)
- 1698 – Rasmus Bartholin, Danish medical doctor and mathematician (born 1625)
- 1702 – John Benbow, English admiral (born 1653)
- 1704 – Andreas Acoluthus, German orientalist and scholar (born 1654)
- 1781 – Johann Nikolaus Götz, German poet and songwriter (born 1721)
- 1801 – William Shippen, American medical doctor and anatomist (born 1712)
- 1847 – Felix Mendelssohn, German pianist, composer, and conductor (born 1809)
- 1847 – Thiệu Trị, Vietnamese emperor (born 1807)
- 1856 – Paul Delaroche, French painter and educator (born 1797)
- 1886 – James Martin, Irish-Australian politician, 6th Premier of New South Wales (born 1820)
- 1893 – Pierre Tirard, Swiss-French engineer and politician, 54th Prime Minister of France (born 1827)
- 1895 – Eugene Field, American journalist, author, and poet (born 1850)

=== 1901–present ===
- 1906 – John H. Ketcham, American general and politician (born 1832)
- 1918 – Wilfred Owen, English lieutenant and poet (born 1893)
- 1921 – Hara Takashi, Japanese politician, 10th Prime Minister of Japan (born 1856)
- 1924 – Richard Conner, American sergeant, Medal of Honor recipient (born 1843)
- 1924 – Gabriel Fauré, French pianist, composer, and educator (born 1845)
- 1930 – Akiyama Yoshifuru, Japanese general (born 1859)
- 1931 – Buddy Bolden, American cornet player and bandleader (born 1877)
- 1931 – Luigi Galleani, Italian theorist and activist (born 1861)
- 1940 – Arthur Rostron, English mariner, captain of the rescue ship Carpathia during the Titanic disaster (born 1869)
- 1946 – Rüdiger von der Goltz, German general (born 1865)
- 1948 – Albert Stanley, 1st Baron Ashfield, English businessman and politician, Secretary of State for Business, Innovation and Skills (born 1874)
- 1950 – Grover Cleveland Alexander, American baseball player and coach (born 1887)
- 1954 – Stig Dagerman, Swedish journalist and writer (born 1923)
- 1955 – Robert E. Sherwood, American playwright and screenwriter (born 1896)
- 1955 – Cy Young, American baseball player and manager (born 1867)
- 1957 – Shoghi Effendi, Guardian of the Baháʼí Faith (born 1897)
- 1956 – Freddie Dixon, English motorcycle racer and race car driver (born 1892)
- 1959 – Friedrich Waismann, Austrian mathematician, physicist, and philosopher from the Vienna Circle (born 1896)
- 1968 – Horace Gould, English race car driver (born 1918)
- 1968 – Michel Kikoine, Belarusian-French painter and soldier (born 1892)
- 1969 – Carlos Marighella, Brazilian author and activist (born 1911)
- 1974 – Bert Patenaude, American soccer player (born 1909)
- 1975 – Francis Dvornik, Czech priest and academic (born 1893)
- 1975 – Izzat Husrieh, Syrian journalist, historian, and academic (born 1914)
- 1976 – Toni Ulmen, German race car driver and motorcycle racer (born 1906)
- 1977 – Tom Reamy, American author and illustrator (born 1935)
- 1980 – Elsie MacGill, Canadian-American engineer and author (born 1905)
- 1982 – Dominique Dunne, American actress (born 1959)
- 1982 – Burhan Felek, Turkish lawyer and journalist (born 1889)
- 1982 – Gil Whitney, American journalist (born 1940)
- 1984 – Ümit Yaşar Oğuzcan, Turkish poet and author (born 1926)
- 1986 – Kurt Hirsch, German-English mathematician and academic (born 1906)
- 1988 – Kleanthis Vikelidis, Greek footballer and manager (born 1916)
- 1992 – George Klein, Canadian engineer, invented the motorized wheelchair (born 1904)
- 1994 – Sam Francis, American soldier and painter (born 1923)
- 1995 – Gilles Deleuze, French philosopher and scholar (born 1925)
- 1995 – Paul Eddington, English actor (born 1927)
- 1995 – Yitzhak Rabin, Israeli general and politician, 5th Prime Minister of Israel, Nobel Peace Prize laureate (born 1922)
- 1995 – Morrie Schwartz, American sociologist, author, and academic (born 1916)
- 1997 – Richard Hooker, American novelist (born 1924)
- 1999 – Malcolm Marshall, Barbadian cricketer and coach (born 1958)
- 2003 – Charles Causley, Cornish author and poet (born 1917)
- 2003 – Richard Wollheim, English philosopher, author, and academic (born 1923)
- 2005 – Nadia Anjuman, Afghan journalist and poet (born 1980)
- 2005 – Sheree North, American actress and dancer (born 1932)
- 2005 – Graham Payn, South African-born English actor and singer (born 1918)
- 2005 – Hiro Takahashi, Japanese singer-songwriter and guitarist (born 1964)
- 2006 – Frank Arthur Calder, Canadian lawyer and politician (born 1915)
- 2006 – Ernestine Gilbreth Carey, American author (born 1908)
- 2007 – Karl Rebane, Estonian physicist and academic (born 1926)
- 2007 – Peter Viertel, German-American author and screenwriter (born 1920)
- 2008 – Michael Crichton, American medical doctor, author, director, producer, and screenwriter (born 1942)
- 2008 – Rosella Hightower, American ballerina (born 1920)
- 2008 – Juan Camilo Mouriño, French-Mexican economist and politician, Mexican Secretary of the Interior (born 1971)
- 2009 – Hubertus Brandenburg, German bishop (born 1923)
- 2010 – Sparky Anderson, American baseball player and manager (born 1934)
- 2011 – Arnold Green, Latvian-Estonian soldier and politician (born 1920)
- 2011 – Andy Rooney, American author, critic, journalist, and television personality (born 1919)
- 2012 – David Resnick, Brazilian-Israeli architect, designed Yad Kennedy (born 1924)
- 2013 – John D. Hawk, American sergeant, Medal of Honor recipient (born 1924)
- 2013 – Leonid Stolovich, Russian-Estonian philosopher and academic (born 1929)
- 2013 – Ray Willsey, Canadian-American football player and coach (born 1928)
- 2014 – Enrique Olivera, Argentinian lawyer and politician, 2nd Chief of Government of the City of Buenos Aires (born 1940)
- 2014 – George Edgar Slusser, American author and academic (born 1939)
- 2014 – S. Donald Stookey, American physicist and chemist, invented CorningWare (born 1915)
- 2015 – Piotr Domaradzki, Polish-American historian and journalist (born 1946)
- 2015 – René Girard, French-American historian, philosopher, and critic (born 1923)
- 2015 – Károly Horváth, Romanian-Hungarian cellist, flute player, and composer (born 1950)
- 2015 – Lee Robinson, American lawyer and politician (born 1943)
- 2016 – Catherine Davani, first female Papua New Guinean judge (born 1960)
- 2016 – Mansour Pourheidari, Iranian football player and coach (born 1946)
- 2017 – Isabel Granada, Filipino-Spanish actress and singer (born 1976)
- 2017 – Ned Romero, American actor and opera singer (born 1926)
- 2019 – Gay Byrne, Irish broadcaster (born 1934)
- 2020 – Ken Hensley, English rock singer-songwriter and musician (born 1945)
- 2023 – Akbar Golpayegani, Iranian vocalist (born 1934)
- 2024 – Bernard Marcus, American billionaire businessman and philanthropist (born 1929)
- 2024 – Murray Sinclair, Canadian lawyer and politician (born 1951)

== Holidays and observances ==
- Christian feast day:
  - Charles Borromeo (Roman Catholic Church)
  - Emeric of Hungary
  - Felix of Valois
  - Blessed Françoise d'Amboise
  - Blessed Helen Enselmini
  - Joannicius the Great
  - Modesta
  - Our Lady of Kazan (Russian Orthodox Church)
  - Pierius
  - Blessed Teresa Manganiello
  - Vitalis and Agricola
  - November 4 (Eastern Orthodox liturgics)
- Community Service Day (Dominica)
- Flag Day (Panama)
- National Tonga Day (Tonga)
- National Unity and Armed Forces Day or Giorno dell'Unità Nazionale e Festa delle Forze Armate (Italy)
- Unity Day (Russia)
- Yitzhak Rabin Memorial (unofficial, but widely commemorated)
