= Zhilinsky =

Zhilinsky (feminine: Zhilinskaya) is a Russian-language surrname. Polish countertpart: Żyliński, Lithuanian: Žilinskas. Notable people with the surname include:

- Dmitry Zhilinsky (1927-2015), Russian painter
- Marat Zhilinsky, Belarusian historian and politician
- Yakov Zhilinsky, Russian cavalry general

== Fictional characters ==
- Count Zhilinsky – Wealthy Polish count at Tilsit meeting of Napoleon and Alexander in the novel War and Peace
