= Foreign Policy and Security Research Center =

Belarusian nongovernmental organization

Foreign Policy and Security Research center
- Founded: 2008
- Type: Non-governmental organisation
- Purpose: Foreign Policy and Security Research center has the capacity to implement research programs, to conduct sociological research, scientific seminars, conferences, lectures, other informational, academic and research events. Its spokespersons act as experts in the evaluation of current events in Belarus and abroad.
- Location: Minsk, Belarus
- Key people: Sergei Palagin — CEO, Andrei Rusakovich - chief executive officer, Anatoliy Rozanov - director of studies, Victor Shadurski, Gennady Brovka.
- Website: http://forsecurity.org

== Description ==
The Foreign Policy and Security Research center was established in 2008 by Doctors of History and Ph.D. in history, law, foreign policy and other subjects, who are currently working in the following public institutions of Belarus: Belarusian National Technical University, Academy of Public Administration under the aegis of the President of the Republic of Belarus, Belarusian State University (Faculty of International Relations). The official purpose of the Foreign Policy and Security Research center is to increase mutual understanding between Belarus and Europe to help Europeans learn more about Belarus. The Foreign Policy and Security Research center emphasizes its status as a nongovernmental organization, it ready to cooperate with all interested persons and organizations.

== Staff ==
- Rozanov Anatoliy Arkadievich – Doctor of History, Professor of International Relations (Faculty of International Relations, BSU, Minsk). Research interests - United States and International Organizations; U.S. foreign policy; the Evolution of NATO; National and International Security.
- Gancherenok Igor Ivanovich - Vice-Rector of the Academy of Public Administration under the aegis of the President of the Republic of Belarus, Doctor of Physics and Mathematics, Professor. Research interests - International Cooperation in Higher Education; Administration in Higher Education; Polarization Nonlinear Optics and Spectroscopy.
- Malevich Ulianna Igorevna - Doctor of Policy, Professor of International Relations (Faculty of International Relations, BSU, Minsk). Research interests - Foreign Policy of Asian and Pacific Rim countries; Foreign Policy of China and Japan; Bilateral Interaction between Belarus-China; human rights issues in contemporary international relations.
- Prannik Tatiana Alexandrovna - PhD in History, CEO of the Center for International Cooperation and Educational Programs of the Academy of Management under the President of the Republic of Belarus. Research interests - history of Germany; international relations in the interwar period; international cooperation in higher education.
- Shadurski Victor Gennadievich - Dean of the Faculty of International Relations(BSU, Minsk), Doctor of History, Professor of International Relations. Research interests - Domestic and Foreign Policy of France; Place and Role of the Baltic States in Modern World Politics; the Impact of World Development Problems on Belarus.
- Sharapo Alexander Victorovich - Doctor of History, Department Chairman of International Relations (Faculty of International Relations, BSU, Minsk), Professor of International Relations. Research interests - the Belarusian-Russian integration; the political system of Germany; foreign policy of FRG; internal policy of Germany; the political system and foreign policy of Austria; the political system and foreign policy of Switzerland; international relations; global trends in world development.
- Rusakovich Andrei Vladimirovich - PhD in History, Associate Professor of International Relations (Faculty of International Relations, BSU, Minsk). Research interests - Belarus-Germany Relations; the History of the Foreign Policy of Belarus; Modern International Relations; the Formation and Activities of the CIS; the Regional Organization in Asia, Africa and Latin America.
- Selivanov Andrey Vladimirovich - PhD in History, lecturer in International Relations (Faculty of International Relations, BSU, Minsk). Research interests - the UN; the political system and foreign policy of the Nordic countries; migration; refugees.
- Brovka Gennady Mikhailovich - Dean of the Faculty of Management Technology and humanization (BNTU, Minsk), PhD Degree in Education, Associate Professor. Research interests - Economic Security; Customs Management; Management of Educational Systems and Institutions; International Activity of Higher Educational Institutions.
- Tihomirov Alexander Valentinovich - PhD in History, Associated Professor of International Relations (Faculty of International Relations, BSU, Minsk). Research interests - foreign policy of Belarus; foreign policy of Russia; foreign policy of Ukraine; foreign policy of Eastern Europe countries; foreign policy of Western Europe countries; foreign policy of North American countries; international relations.

== Latest research ==
Execution of contract with the Geneva Centre for Democratic Control of Armed Forces (Switzerland) - 2010

== Conferences held under the aegis of FPS ==
«Economic, legal and informational aspects of customs cooperation» 08-09.04.2010

A joint workshop with NATO «NATO: challenges of present and future» 10.12.2009

«Belarus-Turkey: ways of cooperation» 08.12.2009

«Belarus in modern world» 20.02.2009
