= Kruostas II =

Kruostas
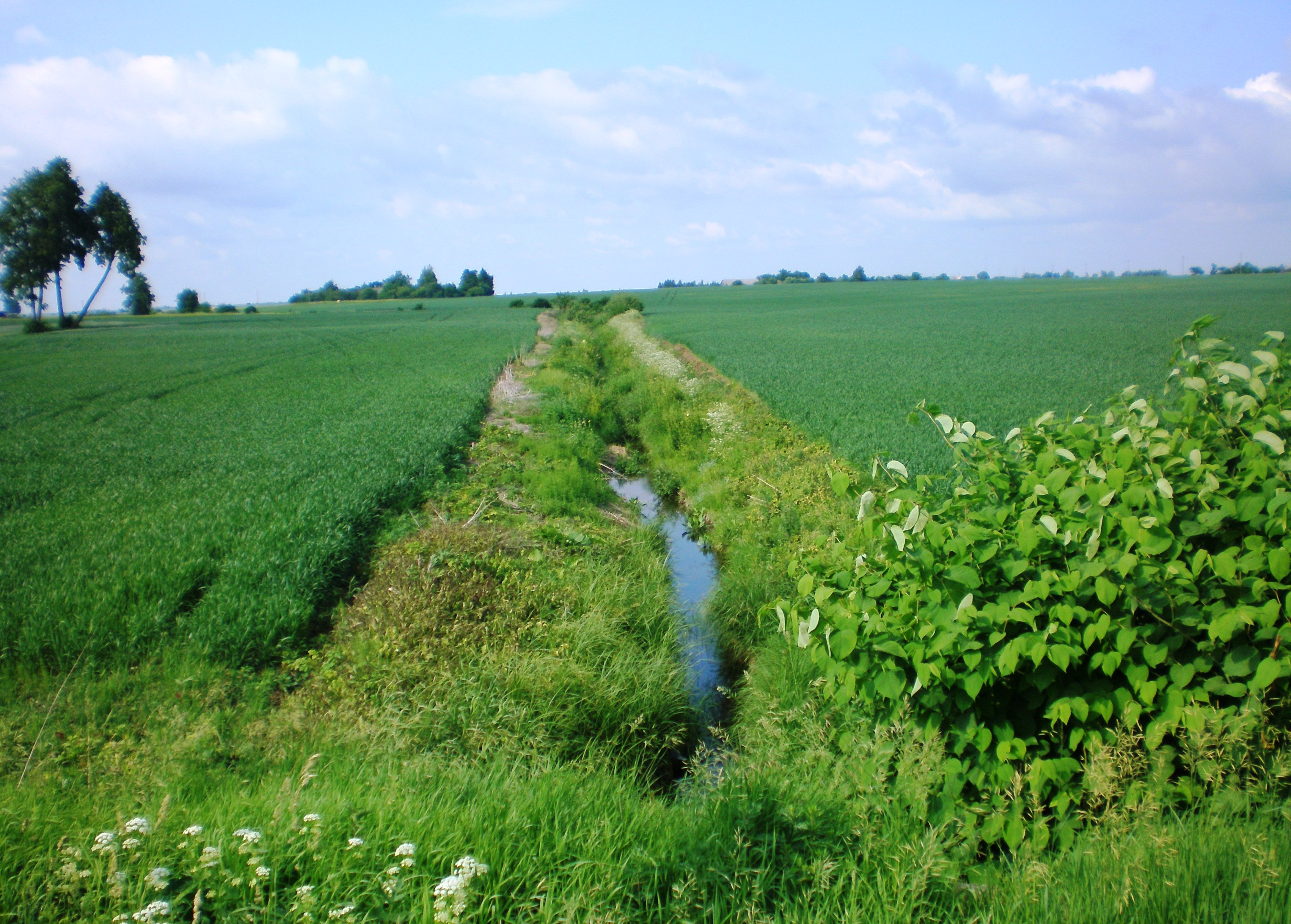
- Kruostas in Berželė

Location
- Country: Lithuania
- Region: Kėdainiai district municipality, Kaunas County

Physical characteristics
- Source
  - location: Pakruostė surroundings
- Mouth: Nevėžis in Kalnaberžė
  - coordinates: 55°23′51″N 24°01′23″E
- Length: 8.0 km (5.0 mi)
- Basin size: 15.5 km^{2} (6.0 sq mi)

Basin features
- Progression: Nevėžis→ Neman→ Baltic Sea
- Tributaries
  - right: Rudupelis

The Kruostas is a river of Kėdainiai district municipality, Kaunas County, central Lithuania. Originating next to Pakruostė, it flows to the southeast for 8 kilometres (5.0 mi) till discharging into the Nevėžis river (from the right side) near Kalnaberžė village. Kalnaberžė hillfort stands at the confluence of the Kruostas and Nevėžis.

The river passes through Pakruostėlė, Berželė and Kalnaberžė villages.

The name Kruostas derives from Lithuanian word kruostas or skruostas ('cheek, eyelash, eyebrow'), further from skrosti, skersti ('to slice, to butcher').
