= Vyacheslav Danilovich =

Belarusian politician (born 1973)

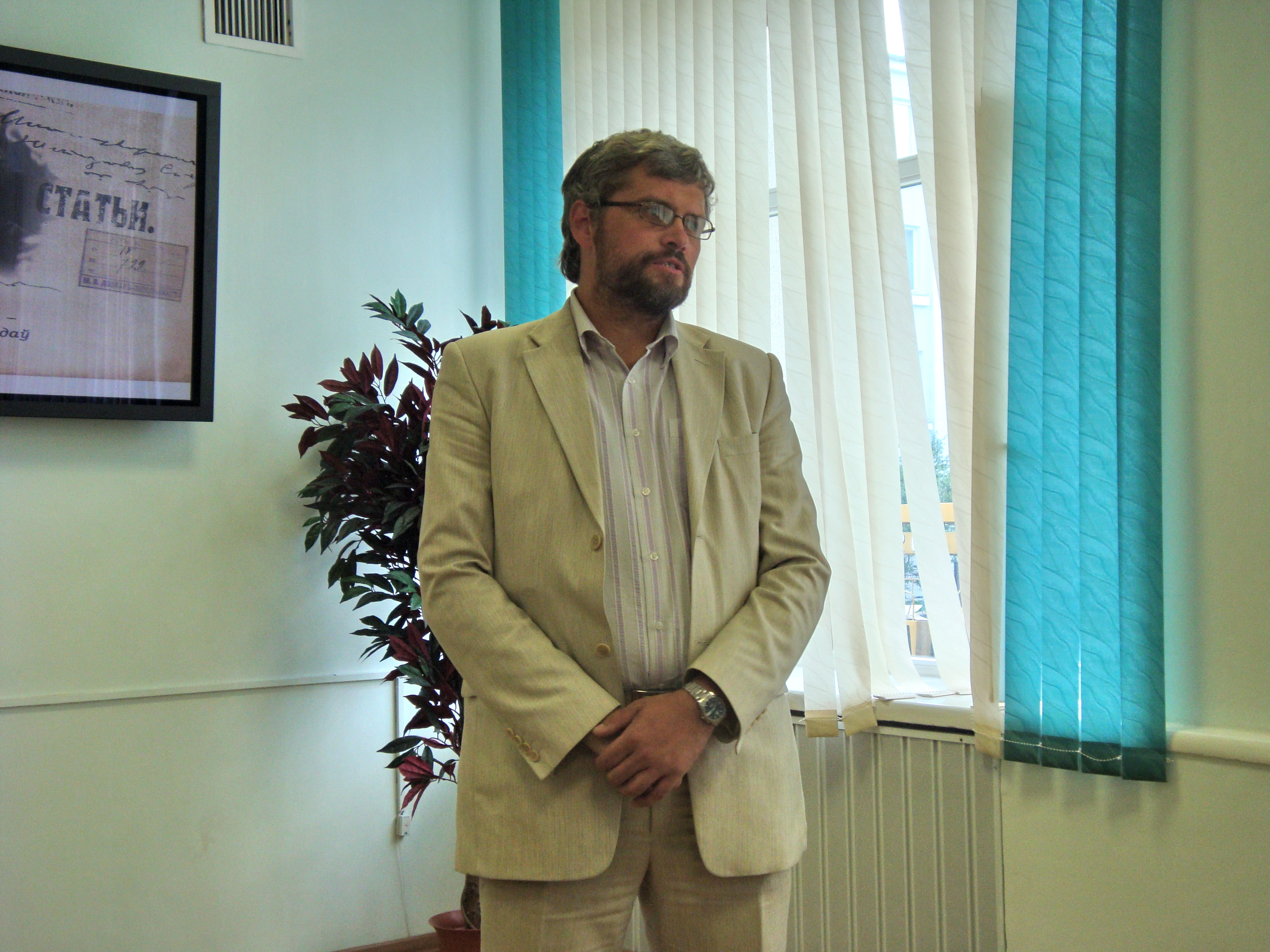
- Danilovich in 2013

Rector of the Academy of Public Administration
- In office 21 September 2020 – 29 March 2024
- President: Alexander Lukashenko
- Preceded by: Gennady Palchik
- Succeeded by: Igor Buzovsky

Personal details
- Born: 21 November 1973 (age 52)
- Party: Belaya Rus

Vyacheslav Viktorovich Danilovich (Russian: Вячеслав Викторович Данилович; born 21 November 1973) is a Belarusian historian and politician serving as a member of the Belarusian House of Representatives since 2024. He previously served as rector of the Academy of Public Administration.
