= Berželė =

- Village
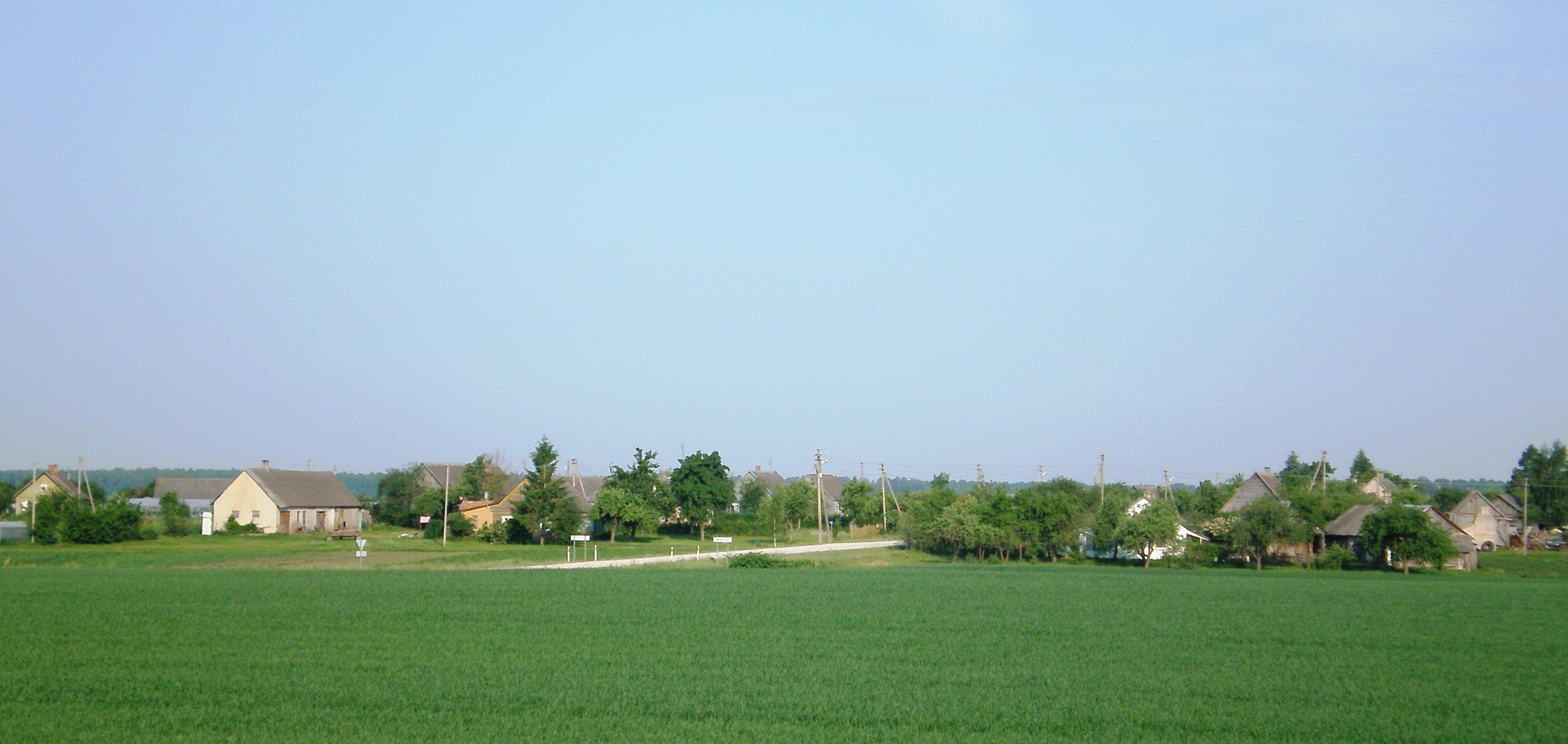

- Location in Lithuania Berželė (Lithuania)
- Coordinates: 55°25′19″N 24°0′40″E
- Country: Lithuania
- County: Kaunas County
- Municipality: Kėdainiai district municipality
- Eldership: Surviliškis Eldership

Population (2011)
  - Total: 47
- Time zone: UTC+2 (EET)
  - Summer (DST): UTC+3 (EEST)

Berželė (formerly Polish: Berżałka, Russian: Бержалка) is a village in Kėdainiai district municipality, in Kaunas County, central Lithuania. According to the 2011 census, the village has a population of 47 people.

== Geography ==
Berželė is located 3 km to the South from town of Surviliškis, near the road which connects Kėdainiai and Krekenava. Also there are local road to Šlapaberžė. The small rivulet of Kruostas crosses the village. It is a right tributary of the Nevėžis River. There is the Kalnaberžė forest to the West from Berželė.

== History ==
Berželė village was mentioned first time in 1572.

== Etymology ==
The name Berželė comes from a Lithuanian name beržas for a birch tree. Once, a large birch forest covered the area and a lot of locations were named with the root berž-, like Kalnaberžė, Šlapaberžė, Beržai, Paberžė.

== Demography ==
Historical population

Year	Pop.	±% p.a.
1902	105	—
1923	94	−0.53%
1959	76	−0.59%
1970	79	+0.35%
1979	110	+3.75%

Year	Pop.	±% p.a.
1984	95	−2.89%
1989	61	−8.48%
2001	53	−1.16%
2011	47	−1.19%

Source: 1902, 1923, 1959 & 1970, 1979, 1989, 2001, 2011

== Images ==
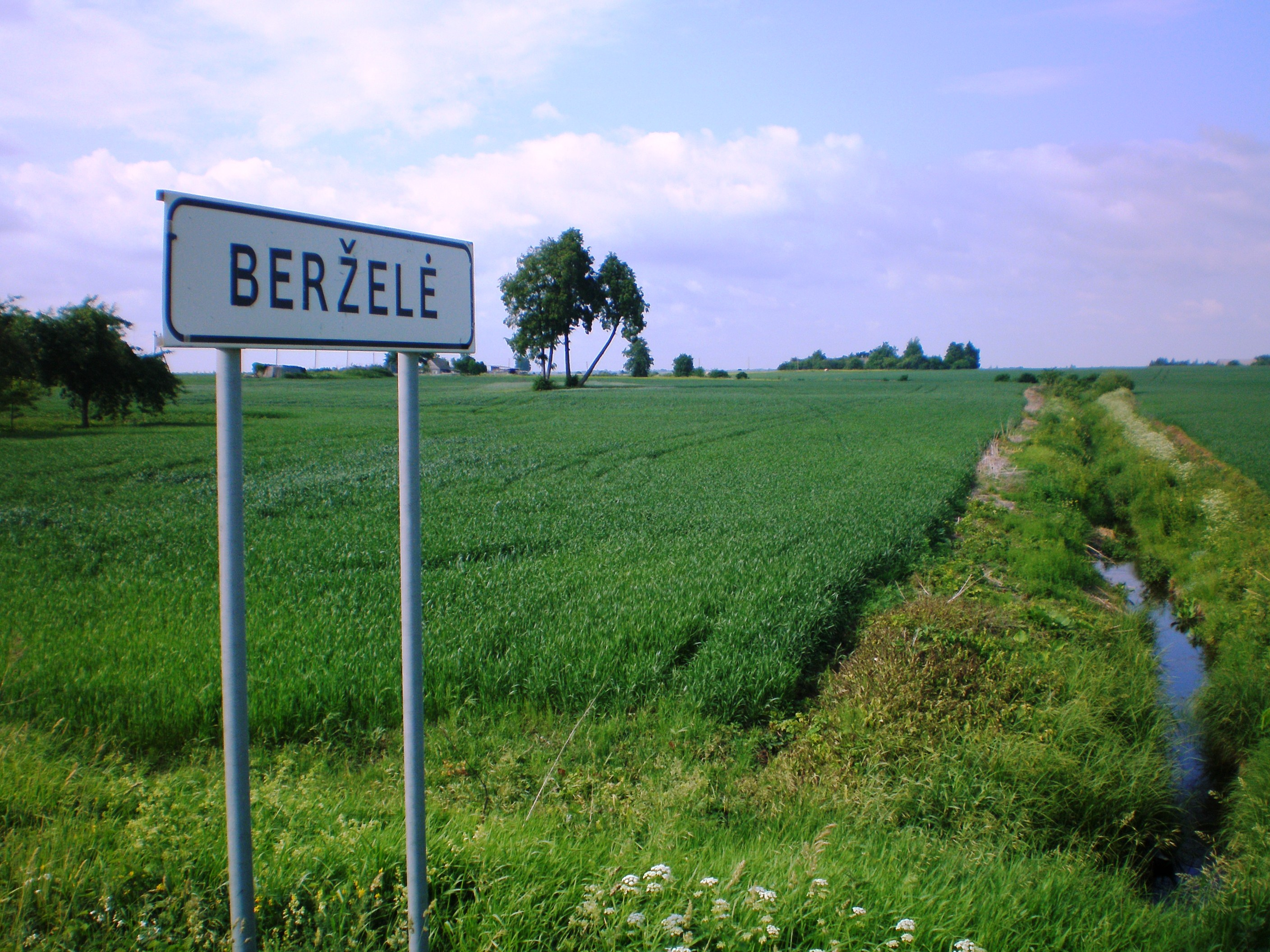
Roadsign

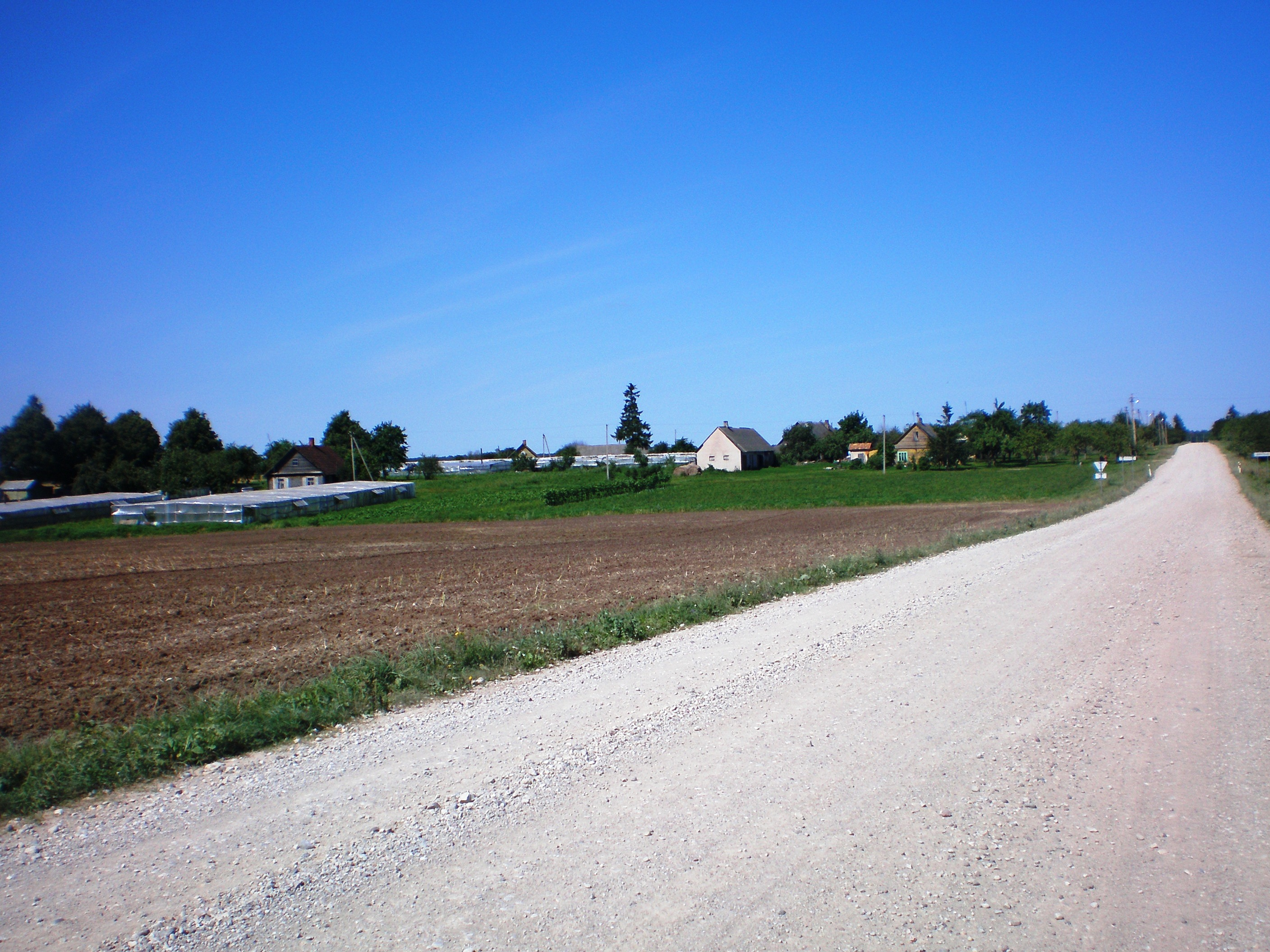
The road to Šlapaberžė through Berželė

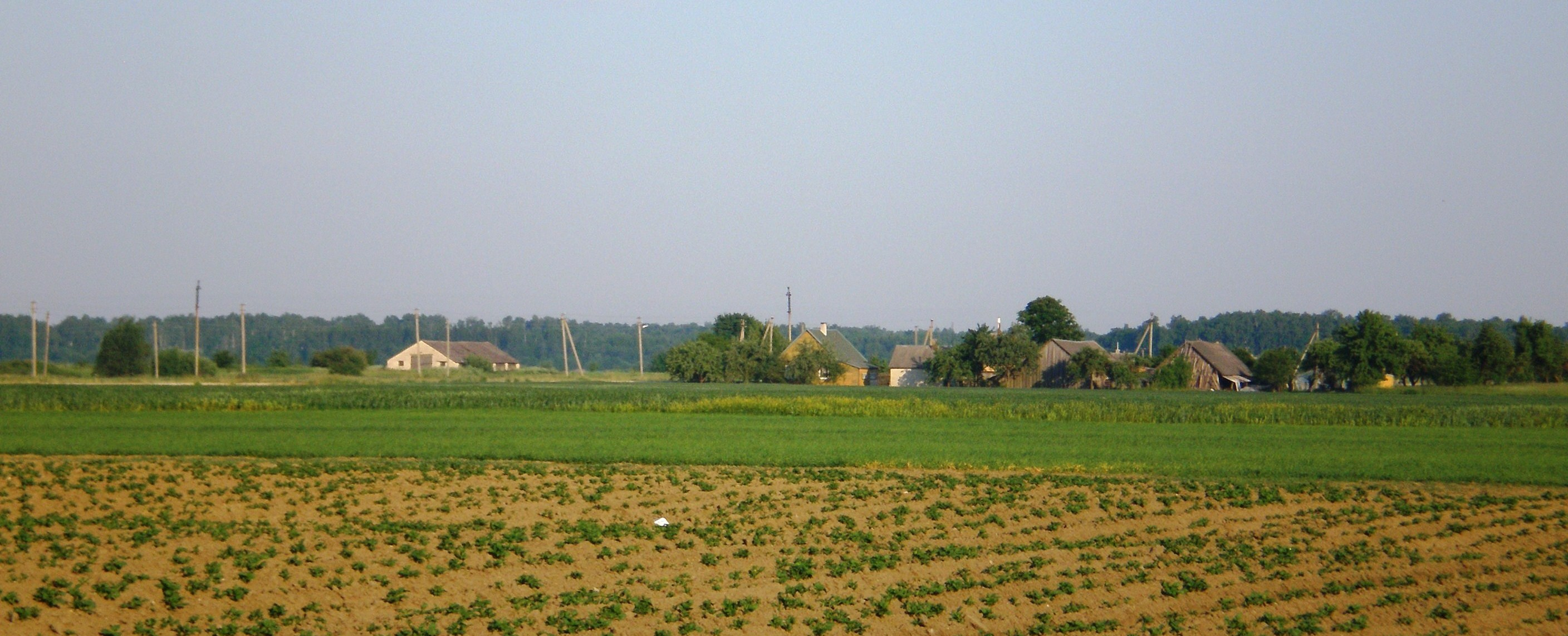
Central part

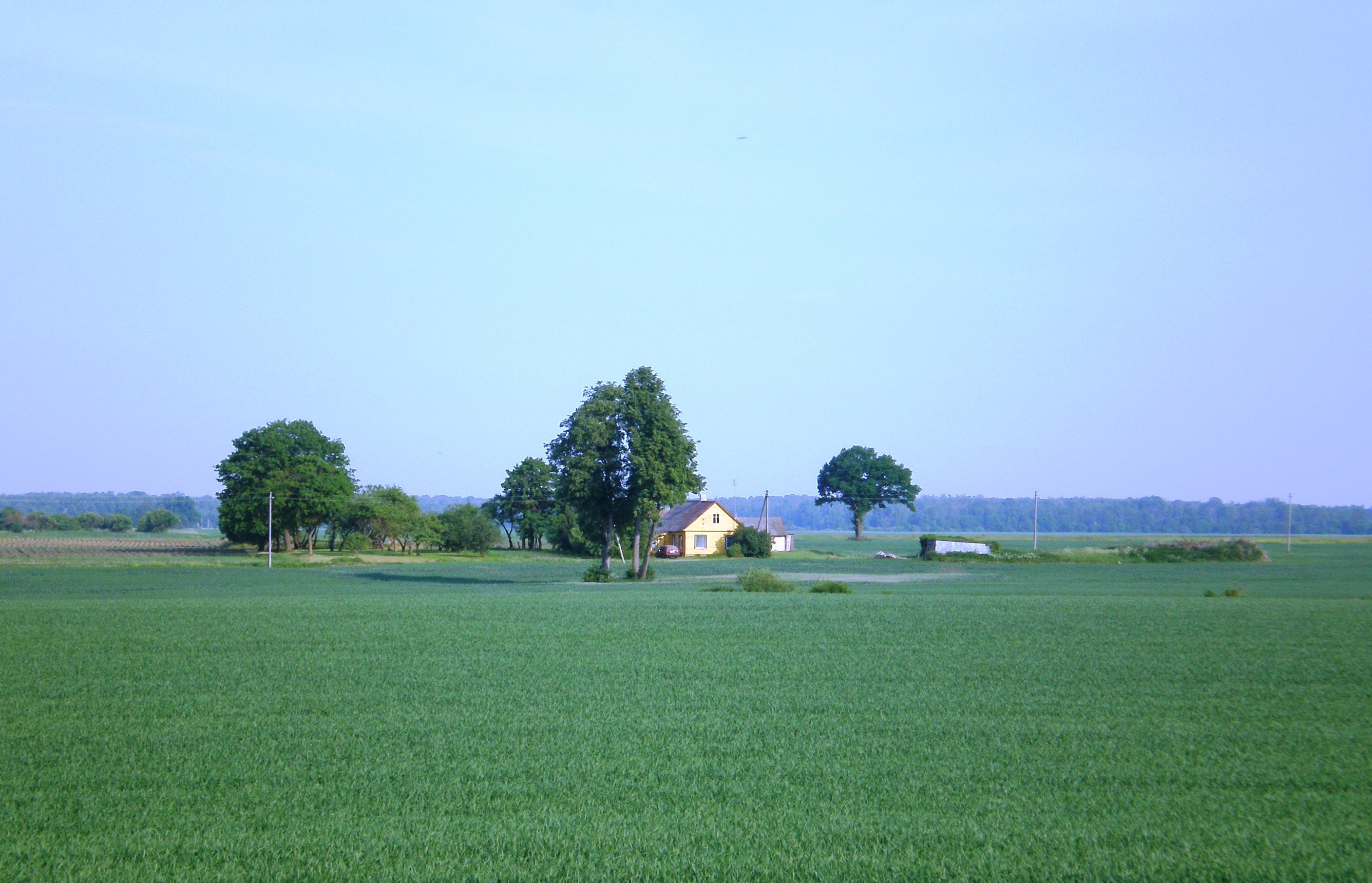
A solitary homestead of Berželė

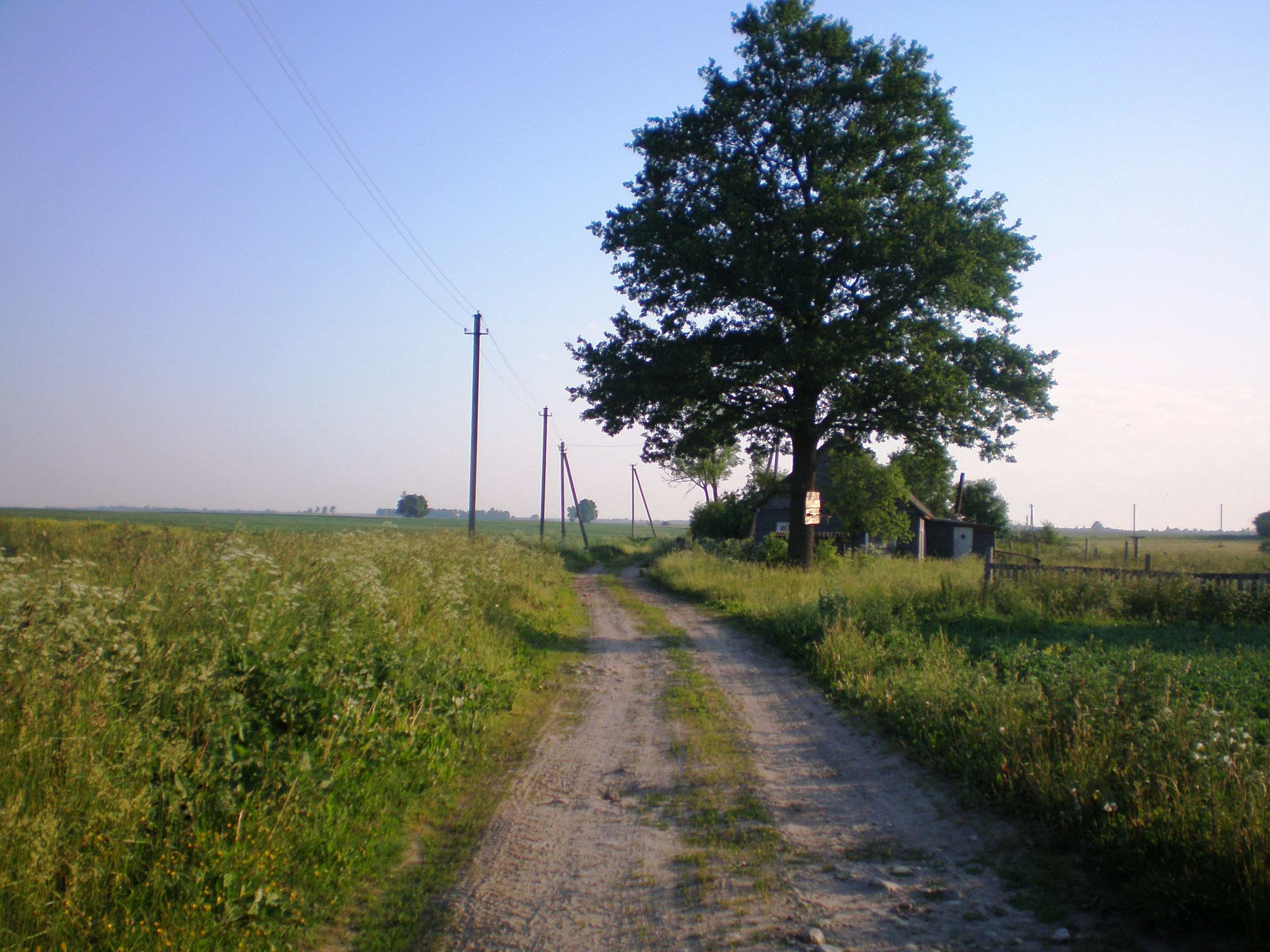
A solitary homestead of Berželė
