= Žilys =

Lithuanian surname

- Lithuanian surname
- m.: Žilys
- f.: (unmarried): Žilytė
- f.: (married): Žilienė

Žilys (or Zilis) is a Lithuanian surname. Notable people with the surname include:

- Žilys:
  - Birutė Žilytė-Steponavičienė (1930–2024), Lithuanian graphic artist
  - Gintas Žilys (1941–2012) was a prominent Lithuanian theatre director, opera creator
  - Juozas Žilys (1942–2024), lawyer, judge of the Constitutional Court of Lithuania
  - Vincas Žilys (1898–1972), Lithuanian general
- Zilis:
  - Shivon Zilis (born 1986), Canadian technology executive
