= Academy of Public Administration (Belarus) =

Public university in Minsk, Belarus

Academy of Public Administration under the President of the Republic of Belarus
- Акадэмія кіравання пры Прэзідэнце Рэспублікі Беларусь
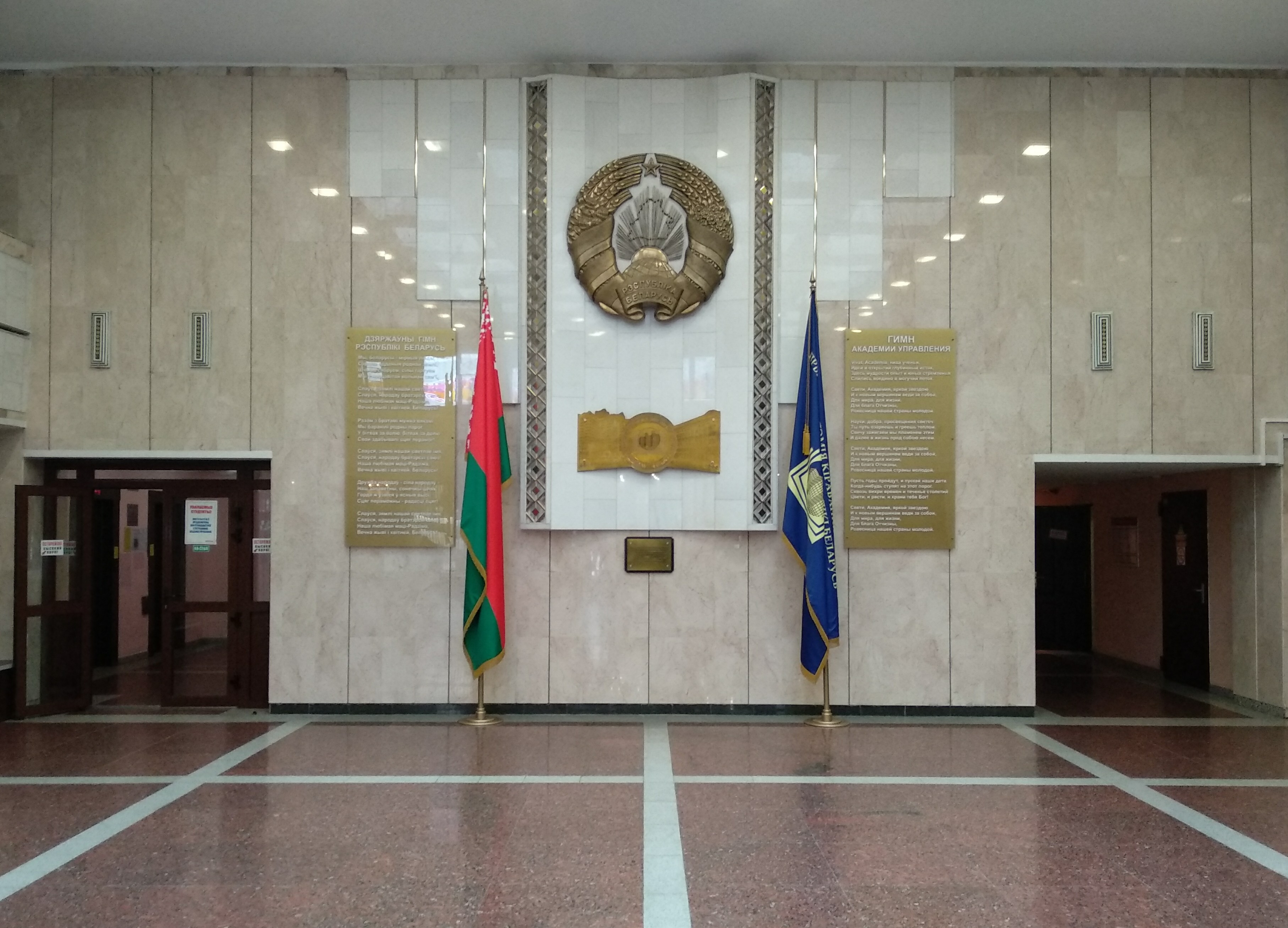
- Former names: Academy of Public Administration under the Council of Ministers of the BSSR (1991-1994); Academy of Public Administration under the Cabinet of Ministers of the Republic of Belarus (1995)
- Motto: Belarusian: Веды для эфектыўнага кіравання!
- Motto in English: Knowledge for efficient governance!
- Type: Public
- Established: 29 January 1991
- Rector: Igor Buzovski
- Students: about 8 500
- Location: 220007, 17 Moscowskaya Str., Minsk, Belarus; 53°53′12″N 27°32′20″E
- Campus: Urban
Colours
Blue
Gold
- Website: www.pac.by

The Academy of Public Administration under the President of the Republic of Belarus (Belarusian: Акадэмiя кiравання пры Прэзiдэнце Рэспублiкi Беларусь, romanized: Akademija kiravańnia pry Prezidencie Respubliki Bielaruś, Russian: Академия управления при Президенте Республики Беларусь) is a higher educational establishment in Minsk, Belarus. The academy was established in 1991 and it acquired the status of a presidential institution in 1995.

== About Academy ==
- History of Academy of Public Administration

The Academy of Public Administration under the aegis of the President of the Republic of Belarus carries out a course of managerial personnel training. It was established in 1991. Each year more than 6000 students, trainees and post-graduate students attend courses at the Academy. About 4500 civil servants also take their upgrading courses here. The Academy of Public Administration organizes traditional international and national scientific conferences.

== Structure ==
=== Rectorate ===
- Rectors
1. Anatoly Shrubenko, Doctor of Economics, Professor (14 September 1992 to 3 April 2000)
2. Piotr Bryhadzin, Doctor of historical sciences, Professor (21 July 2000 to 14 November 2001)
3. Peter Kuharchik, Dr.Sci.Tech., Professor (14 November 2001 to 25 April 2003)
4. Stanislav Knyazev, Doctor of Law, Professor (25 April 2003 to 15 November 2007)
5. Anatoly Morozevich, Dr.Sci.Tech., Professor (15 November 2007 to 2014)
6. Marat Zhilinsky, Cand. Hist. Sci. (15 December 2014 to 18 May 2018)
7. Hennadii Palchyk, Doctor of Pedagogical Sciences, Professor (18 May 2018 to 20 August 2020)
8. Viachaslau Danilovich, Cand. Hist. Sci. (21 September 2018 to 29 March 2024)
9. Igor Buzovski (since 13 June 2024)
- First Pro-rector
- Pro-rector on study
- Pro-rector

=== Institutes ===
==== Managerial Personnel Institute ====
Management Department
- Chair for civil and economic law
- Chair for administrative law
- Chair for constitutional and international law
- Chair for theory and history of the state and law
- Chair for the corporate economy
- Chair for economics
- Office for law
Innovative education department
- Chair for information resources management
- Chair for economic and mathematical management methods
- Chair for foreign languages
- Chair for philosophic sciences
- Chair for physical training
- MA course
Pre-university Education Department
- Center for Social and Psychological Activities

==== Civil Service Institute ====
Education department
- Chair for the theory and practice of state administration
- Chair for ideology and political sciences
- Chair for foreign languages
Re-education department
- Chair for the state administration of the social sphere and Belarusian studies
- Chair for the state administration of economic systems
- Chair for international relations
- Chair for administration psychology
- Chair for the administration of regional agribusiness systems
Career Enhancement Department
- State Development Department

- Organizational and Methodical Office

==== State Administration Theory and Practice Research Institute ====
- State Administration Research Center
- State Human Resources Policy Research Center
- Education Technologies Center
- Center for the Scientific Support for the Automated Data System Reserve
- Listeners and Students Research Laboratory

=== Centers ===
- IT Center
- Press Center
- Center for International Cooperation and Educational Programs
- Center for Upbringing and Youth Initiatives
- Trade complex of the Academy of Public Administration under the aegis of the Belarus President
- Publishing Center

== International cooperation ==
The centre was formed to promote Academy's international links and mutually beneficial contacts with related national and foreign educational and research establishments on the basis of bilateral and multilateral agreements and running programmes on cooperation aimed at task solution in managerial personnel training and re-qualification.

The Centre promotes Academy's cooperation with its partner institutions:

- Armenia – Academy of Public Administration of Armenia
- Azerbaijan – Academy of Public Administration under the President of the Republic of Azerbaijan
- Bulgaria – Foundation “Slavyane”
- China – China National School of Administration
- Cuba – Raul Roa Garcia Higher Institute of International Relations of Ministry of Foreign Affairs of the Republic of Cuba
- Czech Republic – College of Social and Administrative Affairs
- Germany – Federal University of Applied Administrative Sciences
- Kazakhstan:
  - Academy of Public Administration under the President of the Republic of Kazakhstan
  - Economic Research Institute
- Kyrgyzstan – Academy of Management under the President of the Kyrgyz Republic
- Lithuania – Lithuanian Institute of Public Administration
- Moldova – Academy of Public Administration by President's Office of the Republic of Moldova
- Poland – Higher School of Management
- Russia:
  - Russian Academy of Public Administration under the President of the Russian Federation
  - Lomonosov Moscow State University
  - Moscow State Institute of International Relations (University) of the MFA of Russia
  - Volga-Vyatka Academy of Civil Service
  - Diplomatic Academy of the Russian Ministry for Foreign Affairs
  - Moscow City Government University of Management
  - Finance Academy under the Government of the Russian Federation
  - Moscow Institute of Economics, Management and Law
  - Murmansk branch of North West Academy of Public Administration
  - Russian Customs Academy
  - North-West Academy of Public Administration
  - Orlov Regional Academy of Civil Service, Astrakhan State University
- Singapore – Singapore Civil Service College
- Ukraine:
  - National Academy of Public Administration under the Office of the President of Ukraine
  - Odesa Regional Institute of Public Administration
  - Kharkiv Regional Institute of Public Administration
  - Khmelnitskyi University of Management and Law
- Uzbekistan – Academy of State and Social Construction under the President of the Republic of Uzbekistan
- Venezuela – School of Planning of Ministry of Planning and Development of the Bolivarian Republic of Venezuela
- Vietnam – Ho Chi Minh National Academy of Politics and Public Administration

37 agreements have been signed between the Academy and its partner institutions.

The Centre actively supports student and faculty exchange.

The Centre for International Cooperation and Educational Programmes provides assistance in organizing meetings between Academy's governing body and prominent international figures, lectures by representatives of foreign missions and international organizations held both for teaching staff and students. The Academy was visited by the heads of diplomatic legations from Russia, Kazakhstan, Ukraine, China, Cuba, Venezuela, Turkey, India, UK, France, South Korea, Israel, Poland, Germany, Iran, Lithuania, Moldova, Turkmenistan, Estonia and also by UNDP Resident Representative in Belarus.

=== Eurasian Association of Academies of Public Administration ===
Academies of Public Administration of Belarus, Kazakhstan, Kyrgyzstan, Russia, Tajikistan and Ukraine will create the Eurasian Association of national academies and public administration and public service institutes. To sign authorized documents of Association it is planned in March, 2010 in Minsk.

== See also ==
- List of universities in Belarus
- List of colleges and universities
