= Vincas Žilys =

Lithuanian general

Brigadier general Vincas Žilys
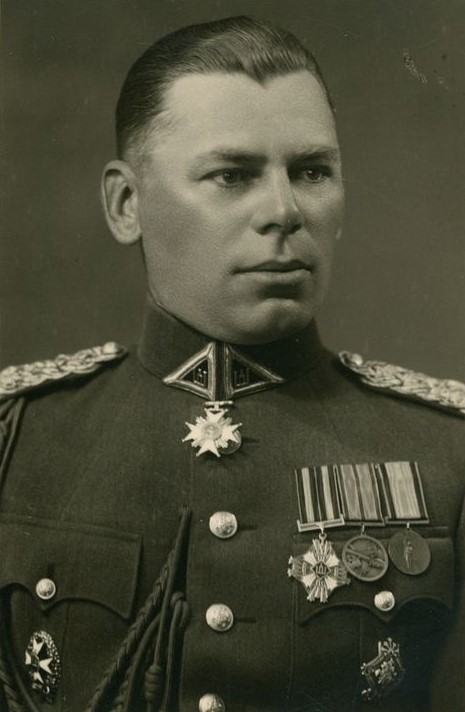
- Žilys photographed with uniform of the Lithuanian Army and state orders in the 1930s
- Born: 2 February 1898; Pakruostė, Russian Empire
- Died: 9 October 1972 (aged 74); Kaunas, Lithuanian SSR
- Alma mater: War School of Kaunas (1923); Academy of the General Staff of Belgium (1932)
- Military career
- Allegiance: Lithuanian Armed Forces (1919–1940); 29th Rifle Corps (1940–1941)
- Service years: 1919–1941
- Rank: Brigadier General
- Awards: Lithuanian Armed Forces Creators Volunteer Medal (1928); Medal of the 10th Anniversary of Lithuanian Independence (1928); Commander's Cross of the Order of the Three Stars (1928); Officer's Cross of the Order of the Lithuanian Grand Duke Gediminas (1928); Commander's Cross of the Order of Vytautas the Great (1938)

Vincas Žilys (2 February 1898 – October 9, 1972) was a Lithuanian brigadier general.

== Early life ==
Žilys was born in Pakruostė, Surviliškis County.

== World War I ==
In 1915, Žilys became involved in activities hostile to the German occupation authorities, as a result of which he was arrested in 1916 and imprisoned in Kupiškis and Panevėžys prisons until 1918.

== Lithuanian Wars of Independence and the Interwar ==
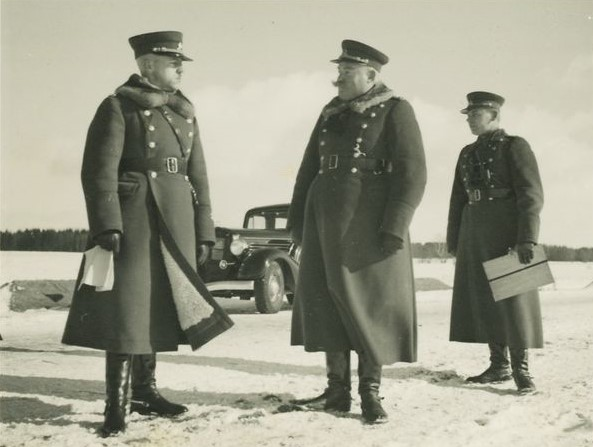
Generals of the Lithuanian Army: Stasys Raštikis, Edvardas Adamkavičius, and Vincas Žilys, 1930s

In 1919, Žilys joined the Lithuanian Armed Forces as a volunteer, and until 1920 he participated in the battles of the Lithuanian Wars of Independence against the military units of Soviet Russia and Poland.

In 1921–22, Žilys was Chief Officer of the Second Battery of the 1st Lithuanian Artillery Regiment, and in 1922–28 he served as Commander of the Second Battery of the 2nd Lithuanian Artillery Regiment.

In 1923, Žilys graduated from the General Courses of Higher Officers' Courses of the Grand Duke of Lithuania Vytautas the Great at War School of Kaunas, and in 1929 he graduated from the Artillery Division.

In 1928–1930, Žilys was the Commander of the Second Artillery Group.

After graduating from the Academy of the General Staff of Belgium in Brussels in 1932, Žilys was appointed to the Fourth (Services) Division of the Chief of Army Staff.

In 1934–35, Žilys served as the Chief of the Artillery Division of the Army Inspectorate, while in 1935–37 he served as artillery inspector, and in 1937–40 as inspector.

== World War II and Soviet occupation ==
Following the Soviet occupation of Lithuania in June 1940, Žilys was appointed Commander of Artillery of the 29th Rifle Corps.

In 1941, Žilys was arrested by the NKVD, and was imprisoned in a prison in Gorky, later in gulags in the Krasnoyarsk Krai, Komi. Žilys was appointed accountant clerk of the gulag since 1946. In 1951, Žilys was deported to the Dolgij Most District (Russian: Долгий Мост) in the Krasnoyarsk Krai and was there in 1951–1955.

After returning to Lithuania in 1955, he worked at the Dailė Factory in Kaunas.

Žilys died in 1972 in Kaunas and was buried in the Petrašiūnai Cemetery.
