= Igor Buzovsky =

Belarusian politician (born 1972)

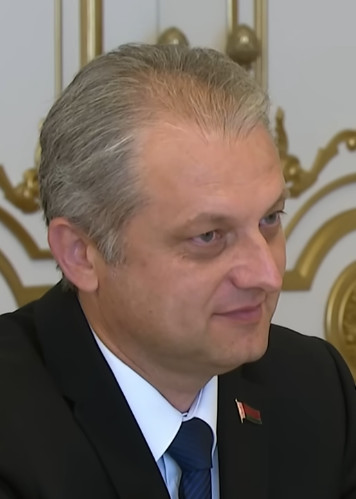
- Buzovsky in 2024

Rector of the Academy of Public Administration
- Incumbent
- Assumed office 13 June 2024
- President: Alexander Lukashenko
- Preceded by: Vyacheslav Danilovich

Personal details
- Born: 10 July 1972 (age 53)

Igor Ivanovich Buzovsky (Russian: Игорь Иванович Бузовский; born 10 July 1972) is a Belarusian politician serving as rector of the Academy of Public Administration since 2024. From 2014 to 2016, he served as deputy head of the Presidential Administration. From 2010 to 2014, he served as first secretary of the Belarusian Republican Youth Union.
