= Pakruostėlė =

- Village
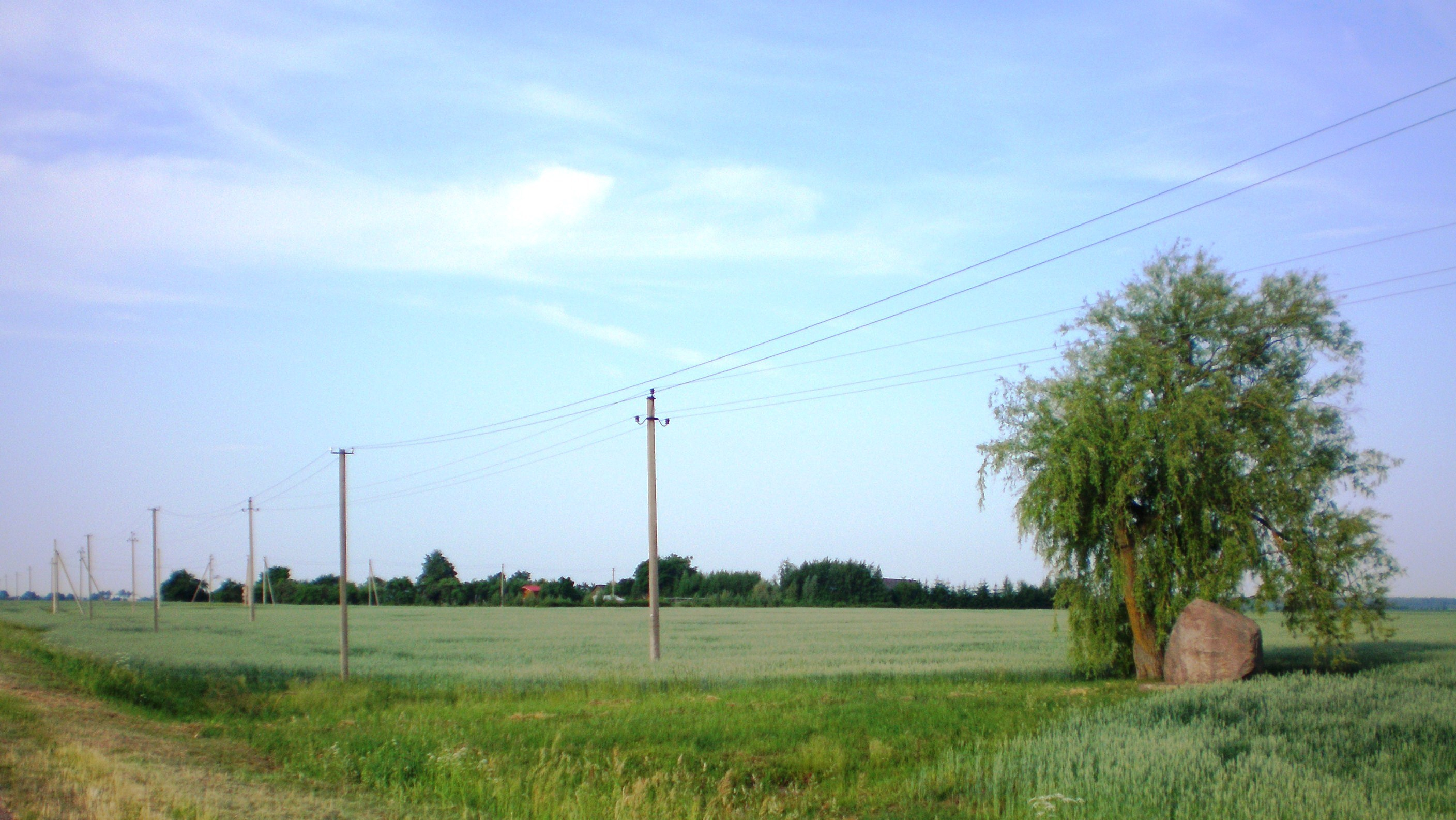

- Location in Lithuania
- Coordinates: 55°25′55″N 24°01′19″E
- Country: Lithuania
- County: Kaunas County
- Municipality: Kėdainiai district municipality
- Eldership: Surviliškis Eldership

Population (2011)
  - Total: 1
- Time zone: UTC+2 (EET)
  - Summer (DST): UTC+3 (EEST)

Pakruostėlė (formerly Polish: Pokrostele, Russian: Покростела) is a village in Kėdainiai district municipality, in Kaunas County, in central Lithuania. According to the 2011 census, the village has a population of 1 person. It is located 2 km from Surviliškis, by the river Kruostas II.

== Demography ==
Historical population

Year	Pop.	±% p.a.
1902	68	—
1923	100	+1.85%
1959	89	−0.32%
1970	41	−6.80%

Year	Pop.	±% p.a.
1979	23	−6.22%
1989	4	−16.05%
2001	1	−10.91%
2011	1	+0.00%

Source: 1902, 1923, 1959 & 1970, 1979, 1989, 2001, 2011
