= Piotr Bryhadzin =

Belarusian historian and politician (1949-2021)

Piotr Byhadzin

Minister of Education
- In office 2001–2003
- Preceded by: Vasil Strazau
- Succeeded by: Alexander Radkov

Personal details
- Born: 24 August 1949 Moładava, Byelorussian SSR, Soviet Union
- Died: 12 December 2021 (aged 72) Minsk, Belarus
- Party: CPSU (until 1991)
- Occupation: Historian

Piotr Bryhadzin (Belarusian: Пётр Іванавіч Брыгадзін; 24 August 1949 – 12 December 2021) was a Belarusian politician and historian. He served as Minister of Education from 2001 to 2003.
