= Vytautė Žilinskaitė =

Lithuanian writer (1930–2024)

Vytautė Genovaitė Žilinskaitė (13 December 1930 – 4 April 2024) was a Lithuanian prose writer, humorist and children's literature writer. She was born in Kaunas. She died on 4 April 2024, at the age of 93.

== Awards ==
- 1965: Vincas Mickevičius-Kapsukas Prize by the Lithuanian Union of Journalists for "Mano neapykanta stipresnė" ["My hatred is stronger: a documentary about the activities of the Raseiniai underground communist youth organization"]
- 1972: Lithuanian SSR State Prize for the best humorous work
- 1979: Lithuanian SSR State Prize for the best children's book Robotas ir peteliškė [The Robot and the Butterfly]
- 1996/1997: Best Children's and Adolescent Book of 1996 and IBBY Lithuania Chapter Award (1997) for Tiputapė
- 2000/2001: Best Children's and Adolescent Book of 2001 and IBBY Lithuania Chapter Award (2001) for Nebijokė
- 2005: Knight's Cross of the Order of the Lithuanian Grand Duke Gediminas
- 2007: IBBY Lithuania Chapter Award (for Kintas)
- 2007: Children's Literature Prize (for Kintas)
