= Marek Żyliński =

Polish politician (1952–2024)

Member of the Sejm
- In office 19 October 2001 – 29 August 2005

Personal details
- Born: Marek Błażej Żyliński; 3 February 1952; Iława, Poland
- Died: 11 December 2024 (aged 72); Iława, Poland
- Political party: UW; PO
- Education: Gdańsk University of Technology
- Occupation: Engineer

Marek Błażej Żyliński (3 February 1952 – 11 December 2024) was a Polish engineer and politician. A member of the Freedom Union and later the Civic Platform, he served in the Sejm from 2001 to 2005.

Żyliński died in Iława on 11 December 2024, at the age of 72.
