= Kalnaberžė =

- Village
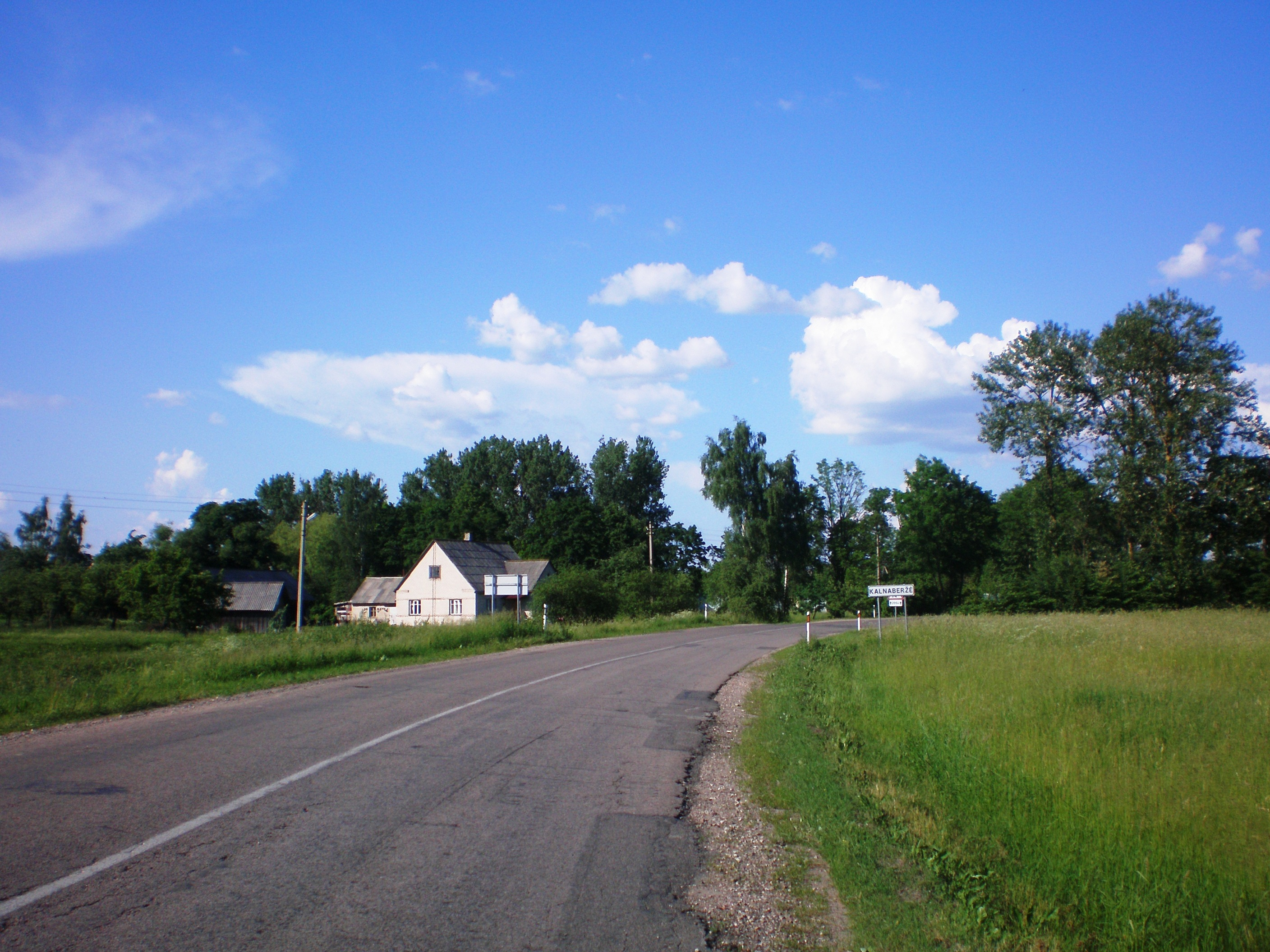

- Location in Lithuania Kalnaberžė (Lithuania)
- Coordinates: 55°23′49″N 24°00′29″E
- Country: Lithuania
- County: Kaunas County
- Municipality: Kėdainiai district municipality
- Eldership: Surviliškis Eldership

Population (2011)
  - Total: 324
- Time zone: UTC+2 (EET)
  - Summer (DST): UTC+3 (EEST)

Kalnaberžė ('the hill of birch trees', formerly Polish: Kałnoberże, Russian: Калноберже) is a village in Kėdainiai district municipality, in Kaunas County, in central Lithuania. According to the 2011 census, the village had a population of 324 people. It is located between Surviliškis (6 km) and Sirutiškis (5 km), on the right bank of the Nevėžis river. At the confluence of Nevėžis and its tributary Kruostas II there is Kalnaberžė hillfort. There is library, old cemetery, former school and medicine station in the village. Kalnaberžė manor (now in ruins) is famous of being a childhood vacation place for Russian minister Pyotr Stolypin.

== History ==
Kalnaberžė (as Calleberze) was mentioned the first time in 1371 by Hermann von Wartberge as Teutonic ride devastated this place. Kalnaberžė manor is known from the 16th century. It belonged to the Radziwiłł family, later to the Czapski family. After the January Uprising it was transferred to the Koshelevski and later to the Stolypin family. At the end of the 19th century there was a wooden chapel.

During the Interwar period, the manor was nationalized and became a child detention colony, and since 1949 till 1959 was a children home. During the Soviet era, Kalnaberžė was a kolkhoz center.

== Demography ==
Historical population

Year	Pop.	±% p.a.
1820	357	—
1902	452	+0.29%
1923	511	+0.59%
1959	491	−0.11%
1970	602	+1.87%
1977	393	−5.91%

Year	Pop.	±% p.a.
1979	605	+24.07%
1985	531	−2.15%
1989	420	−5.69%
2001	377	−0.90%
2011	324	−1.50%

Source: 1902, 1923, 1959 & 1970, 1979, 1989, 2001, 2011

== Notable people ==
- Juozas Vidmantis Vaitkus, Lithuanian physicist

== Images ==
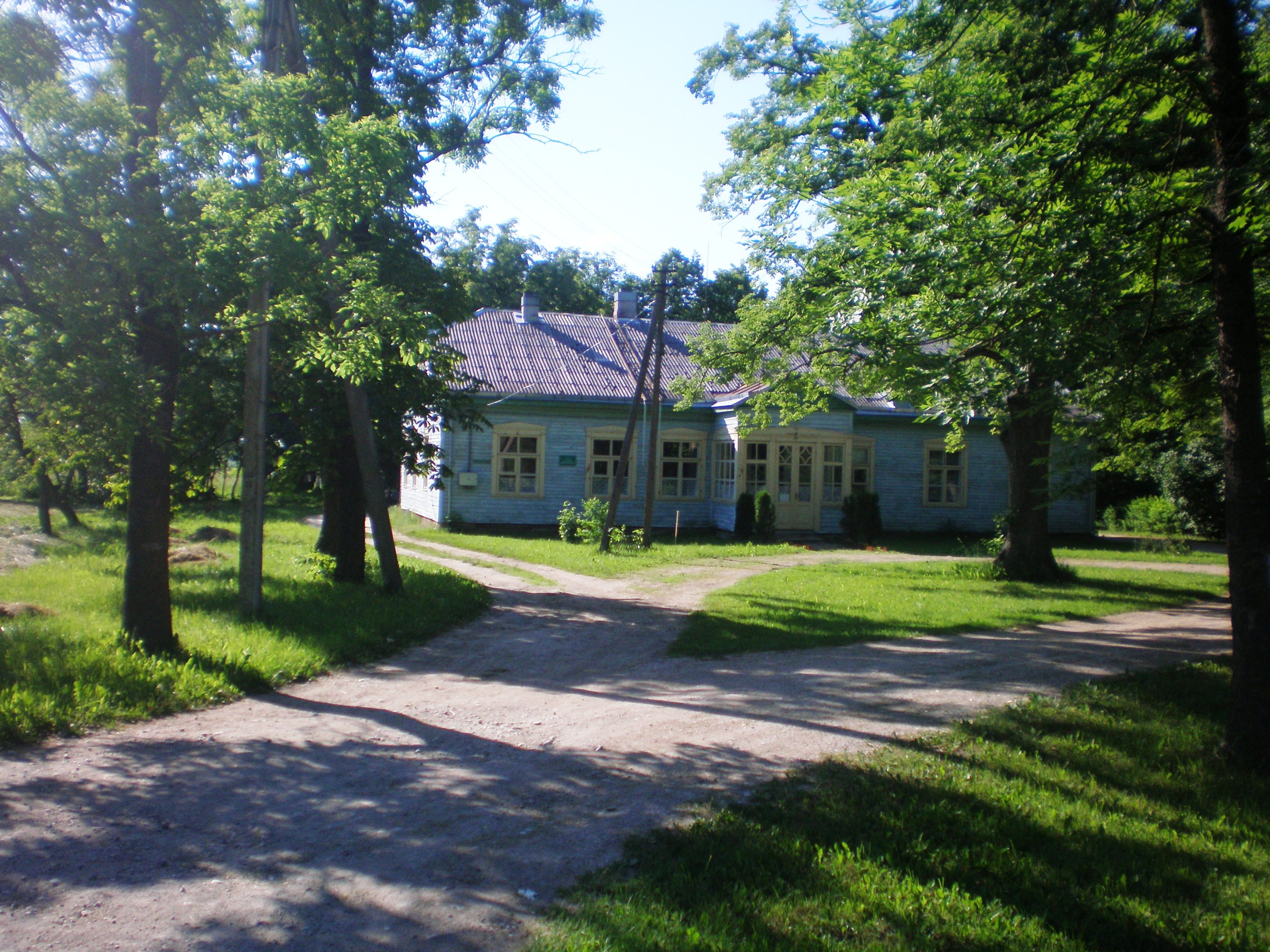
Dispensary

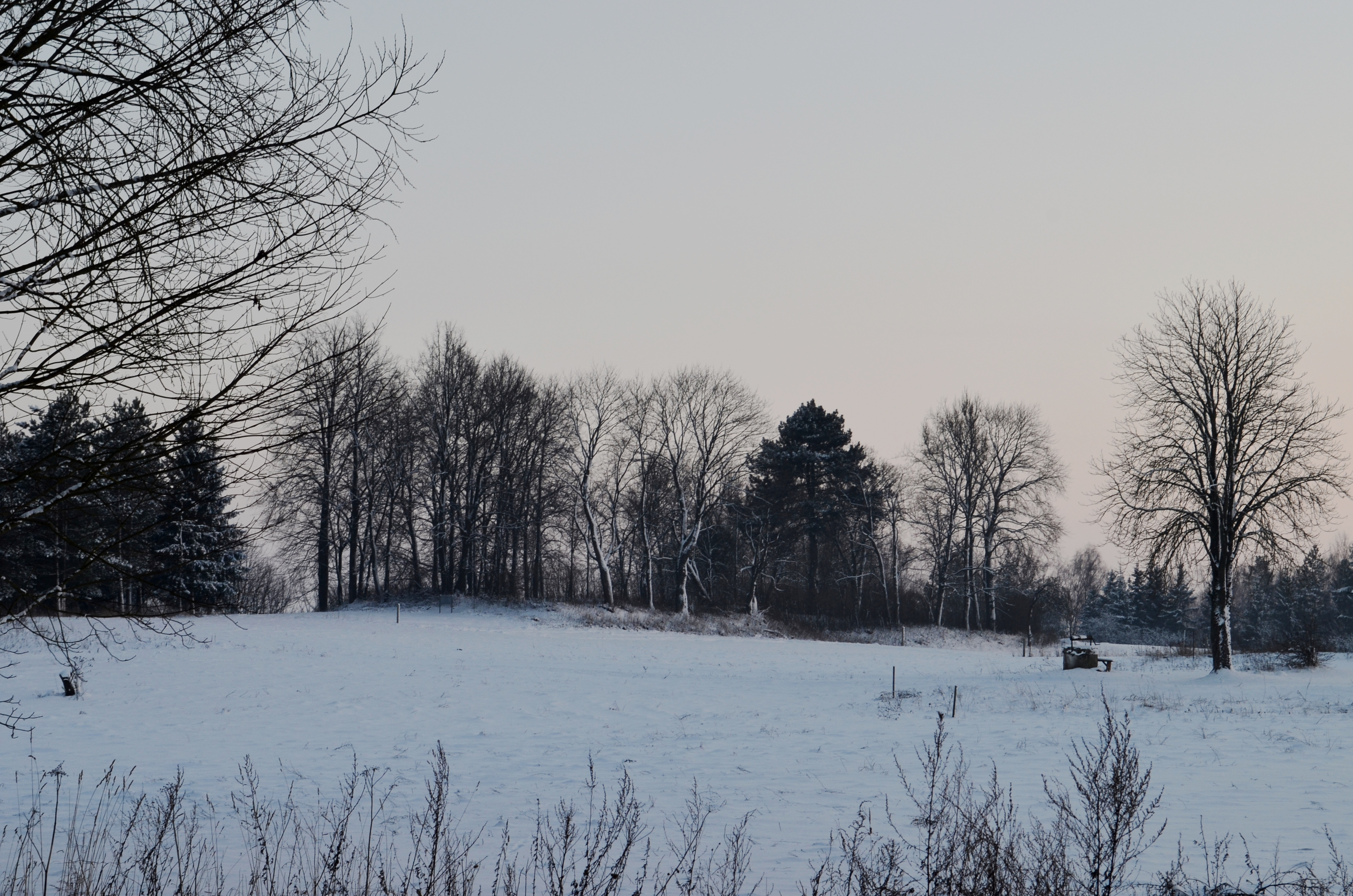
Ancient cemetery

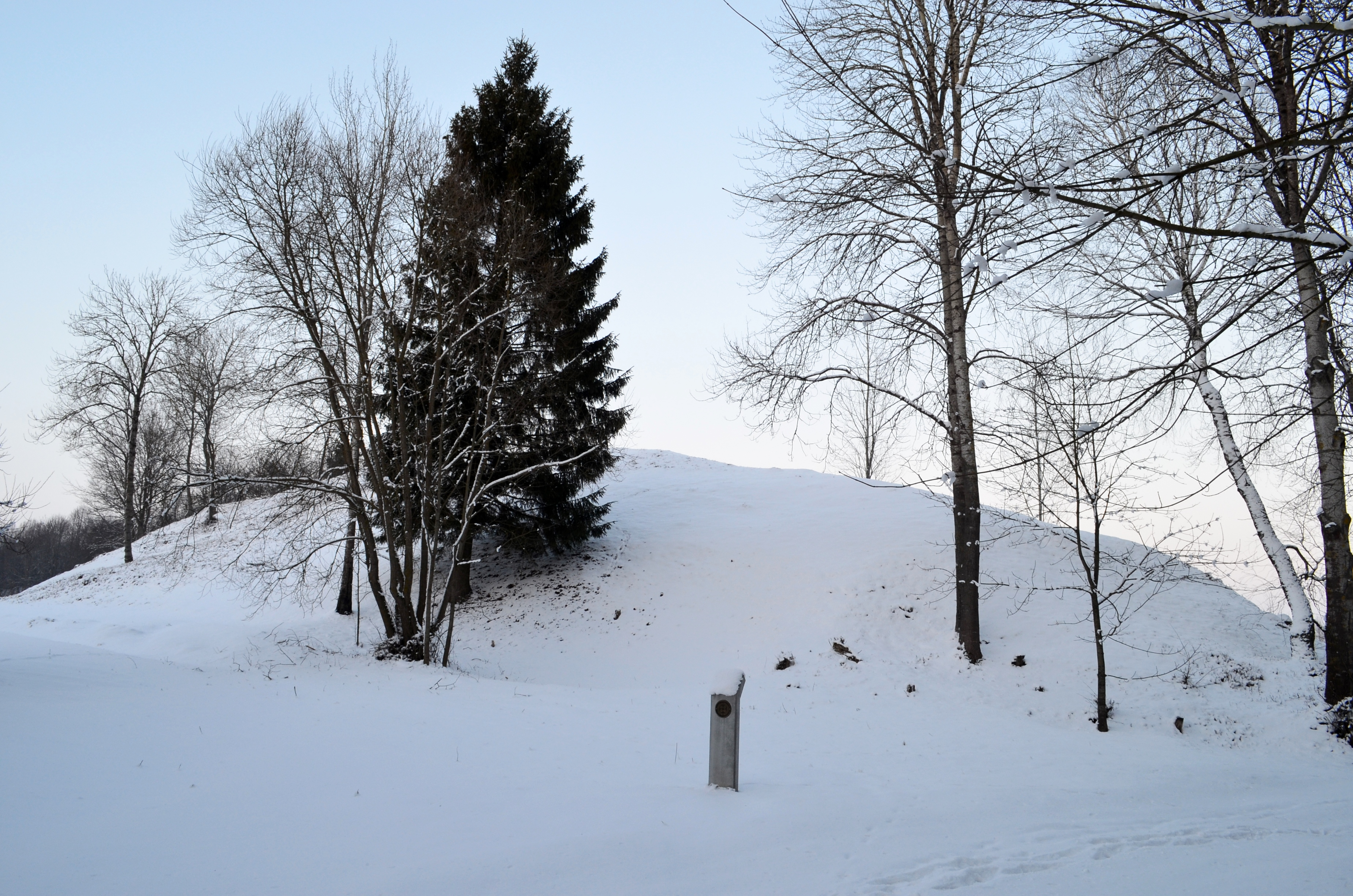
Kalnaberžė hillfort

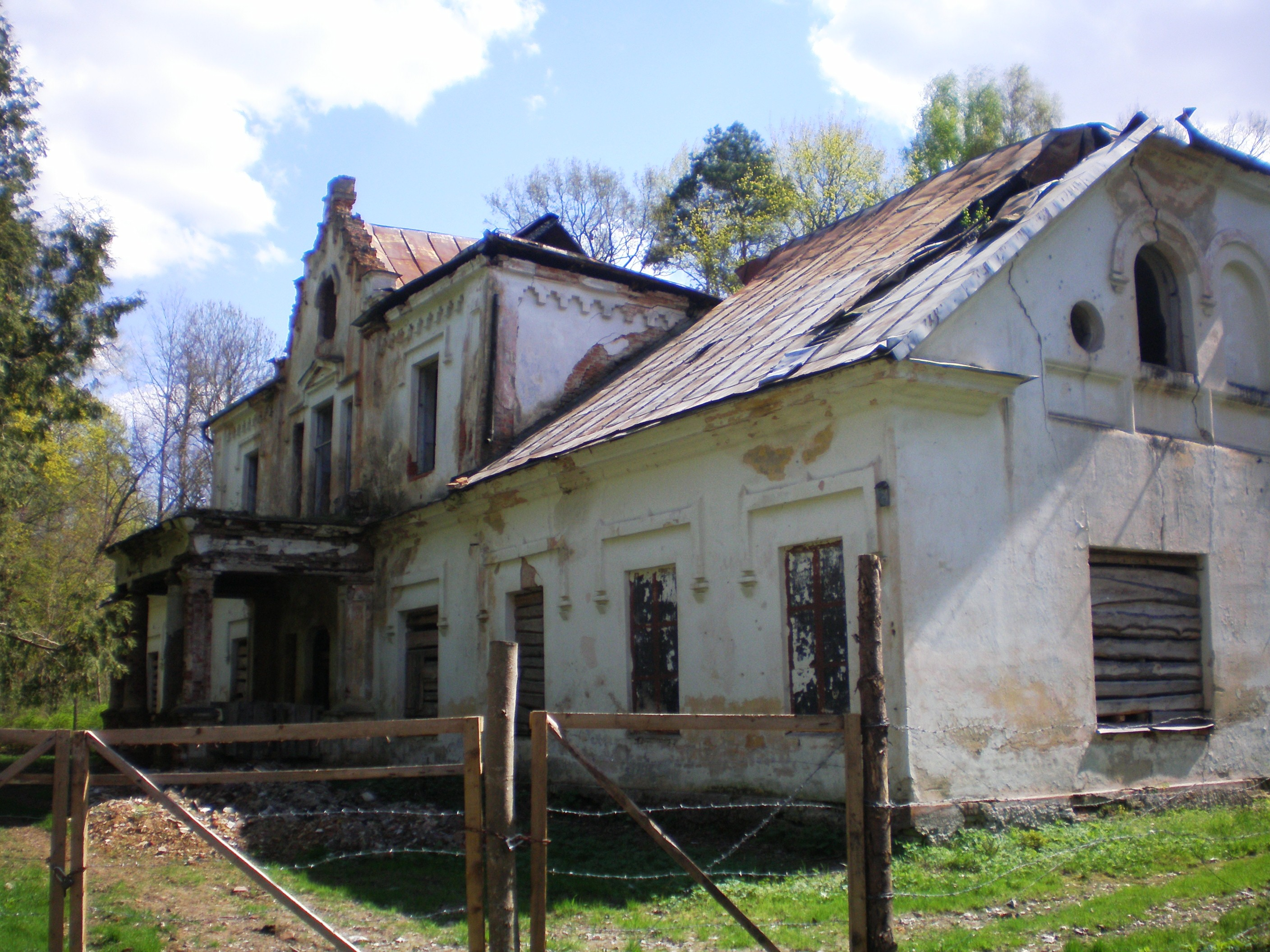
Kalnaberžė manor (in 2011)
