= Marat Zhilinsky =

Belarusian politician (born 1976)

Rector of the Academy of Public Administration
- In office 15 December 2014 – 22 May 2018
- President: Alexander Lukashenko
- Preceded by: Anatoly Morozevich
- Succeeded by: Gennady Palchik

Personal details
- Born: 23 March 1976 (age 50)

Marat Gennadievich Zhilinsky (Russian: Марат Геннадьевич Жилинский; born 23 March 1976) is a Belarusian historian and politician. From 2012 to 2016, he was a member of the House of Representatives. From 2014 to 2018, he served as rector of the Academy of Public Administration.
