= Pakruostė =

- Village
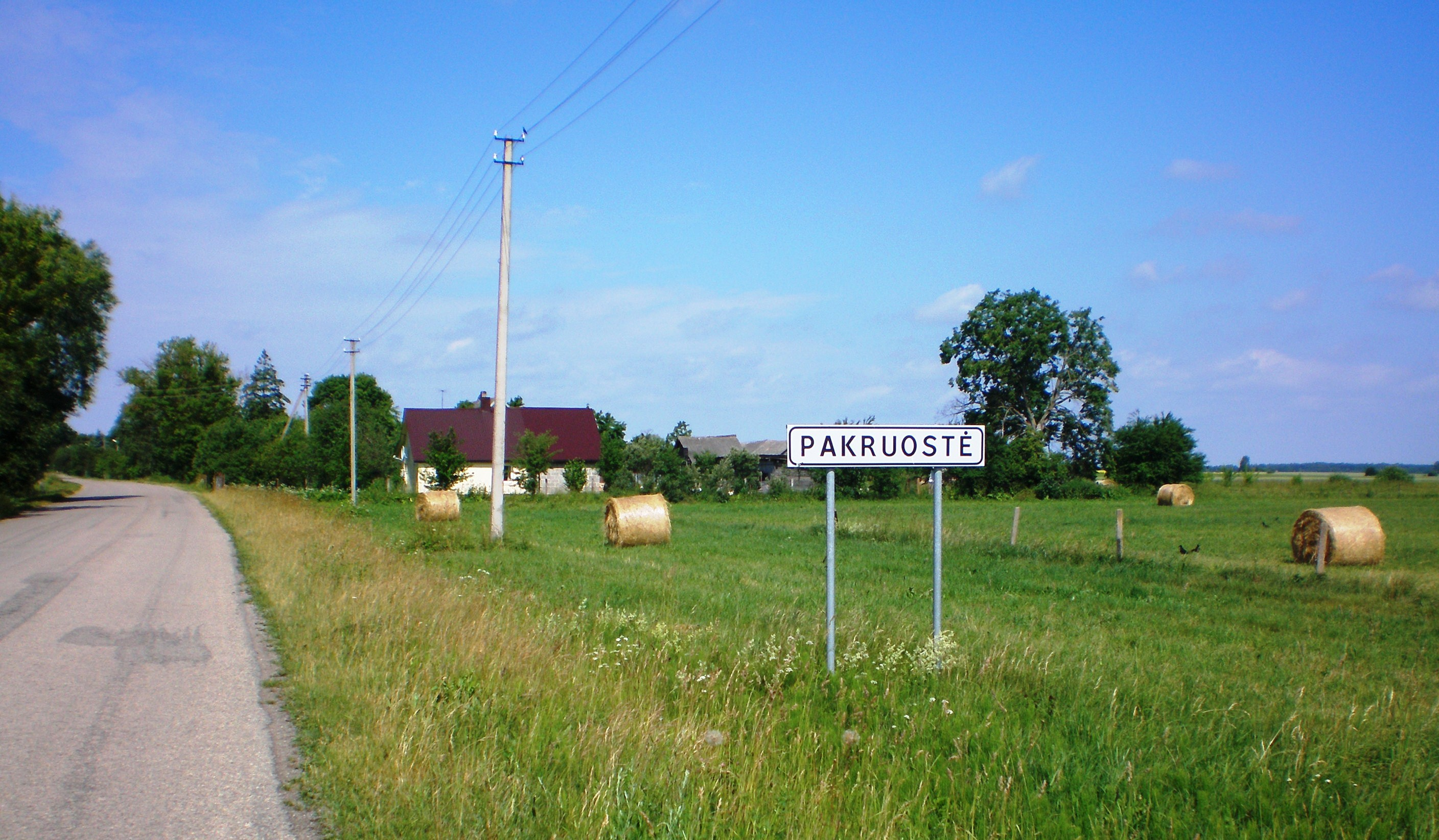

- Location in Lithuania
- Coordinates: 55°27′40″N 23°59′38″E
- Country: Lithuania
- County: Kaunas County
- Municipality: Kėdainiai district municipality
- Eldership: Surviliškis Eldership

Population (2011)
  - Total: 23
- Time zone: UTC+2 (EET)
  - Summer (DST): UTC+3 (EEST)

Pakruostė (formerly Polish: Pokrosty, Russian: Покросце) is a village in Kėdainiai district municipality, in Kaunas County, in central Lithuania. According to the 2011 census, the village has a population of 23 people. It is located 3 km from Surviliškis, 2 km from Lažai, by the rivers of Kruostas II and Liepupis. There is a wooden cross made by local crossmaker Vincas Svirskis.

Pakruostė manor is known since 1596.

== Demography ==
Historical population

| Year | Pop. | ±% p.a. |
|---|---|---|
| 1866 | 240 | — |
| 1902 | 201 | −0.49% |
| 1923 | 196 | −0.12% |
| 1959 | 126 | −1.22% |
| 1970 | 101 | −1.99% |

| Year | Pop. | ±% p.a. |
|---|---|---|
| 1979 | 78 | −2.83% |
| 1986 | 39 | −9.43% |
| 1989 | 43 | +3.31% |
| 2001 | 44 | +0.19% |
| 2011 | 23 | −6.28% |

Source: 1902, 1923, 1959 & 1970, 1979, 1989, 2001, 2011

== Images ==
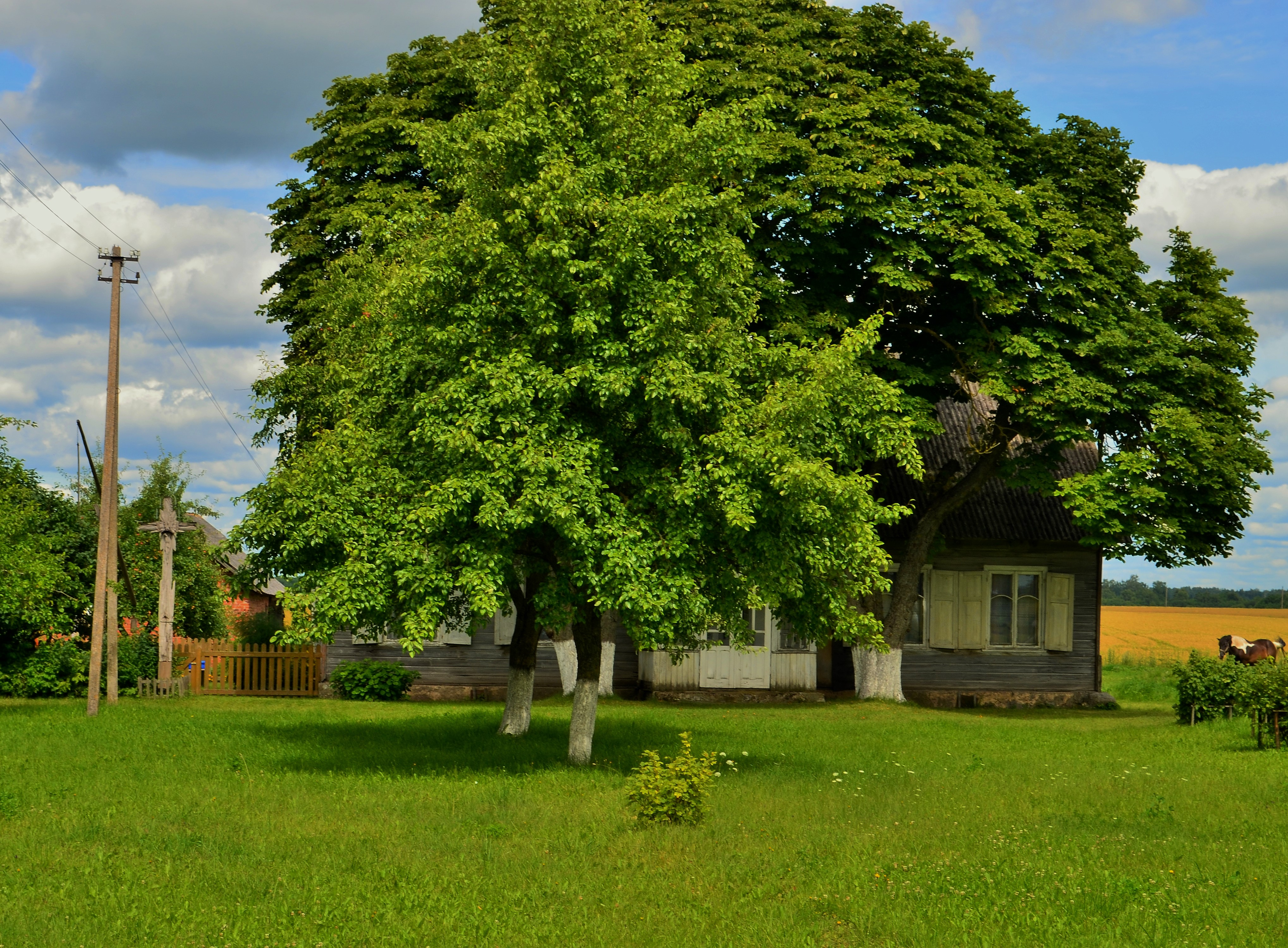
An old Aukštaitian house and V. Svirskis cross

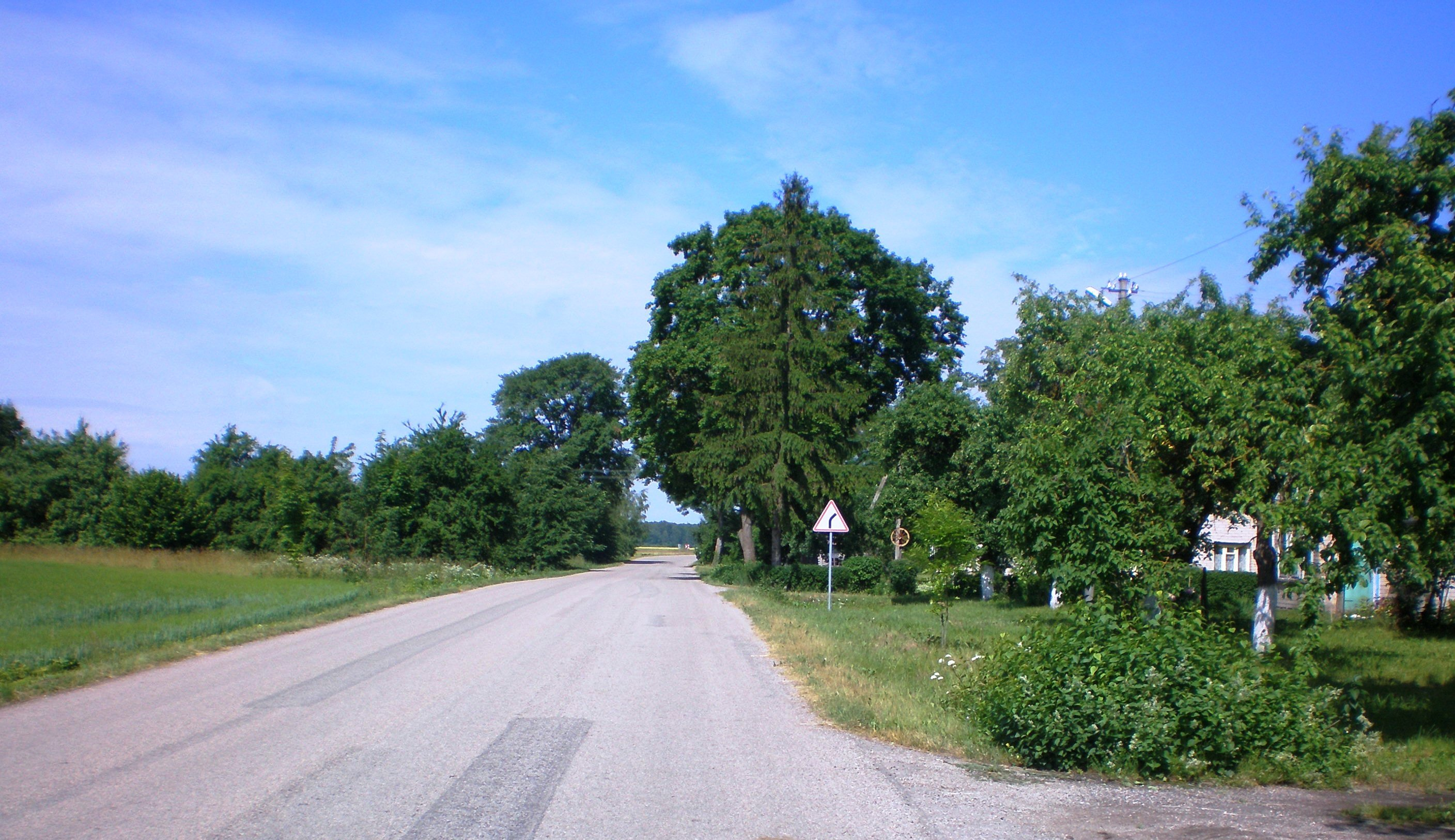
The main street of Pakruostė
