= 2015 Lahore factory disaster =

Fatal building collapse in Pakistan

- 2015 Lahore factory disaster (Pakistan) Approximate location of the factory
- Date: 4 November 2015
- Location: Sundar Industrial Estate near Lahore, Pakistan; 31.2834°N 74.1860°E
- Type: factory collapse
- Cause: possibly caused by construction or earthquake damage
- Deaths: 45
- Injuries: 100+
- Missing: about 150
- Property damage: factory destroyed

The 2015 Lahore factory disaster claimed the lives of at least 45 people when a shopping bag factory callopsed in the Sundar Industrial Estate near Lahore, Pakistan collapsed on 4 November 2015. Around 150 people were trapped under the collapsed structure. The recovery was led by the Board of Management Sundar Industrial Estate with support from the Pakistan Army, Rescue 1122 and Bahria Town Rescue Team.

A large rescue operation included a team of army engineers and urban search-and-rescue personnel. Messages had been received via mobile phones from people trapped under the rubble. The challenge of getting heavy machinery to the site of the collapse hampered the rescue effort, according to an official.

== See also ==
- 2012 Pakistan garment factory fires
