= Tadeusz Żyliński =

T. Żyliński

Tadeusz Żyliński (4 November 1904 in Vilnius – 11 September 1967 in Łódź) was a Polish technician, textilist and mechanical engineer. He was a professor of Technical University of Łódź, creator of Polish school of textile metrology. Author of Metrologia włókiennicza and Nauka o włóknie.
