= Gineitai =

- Village
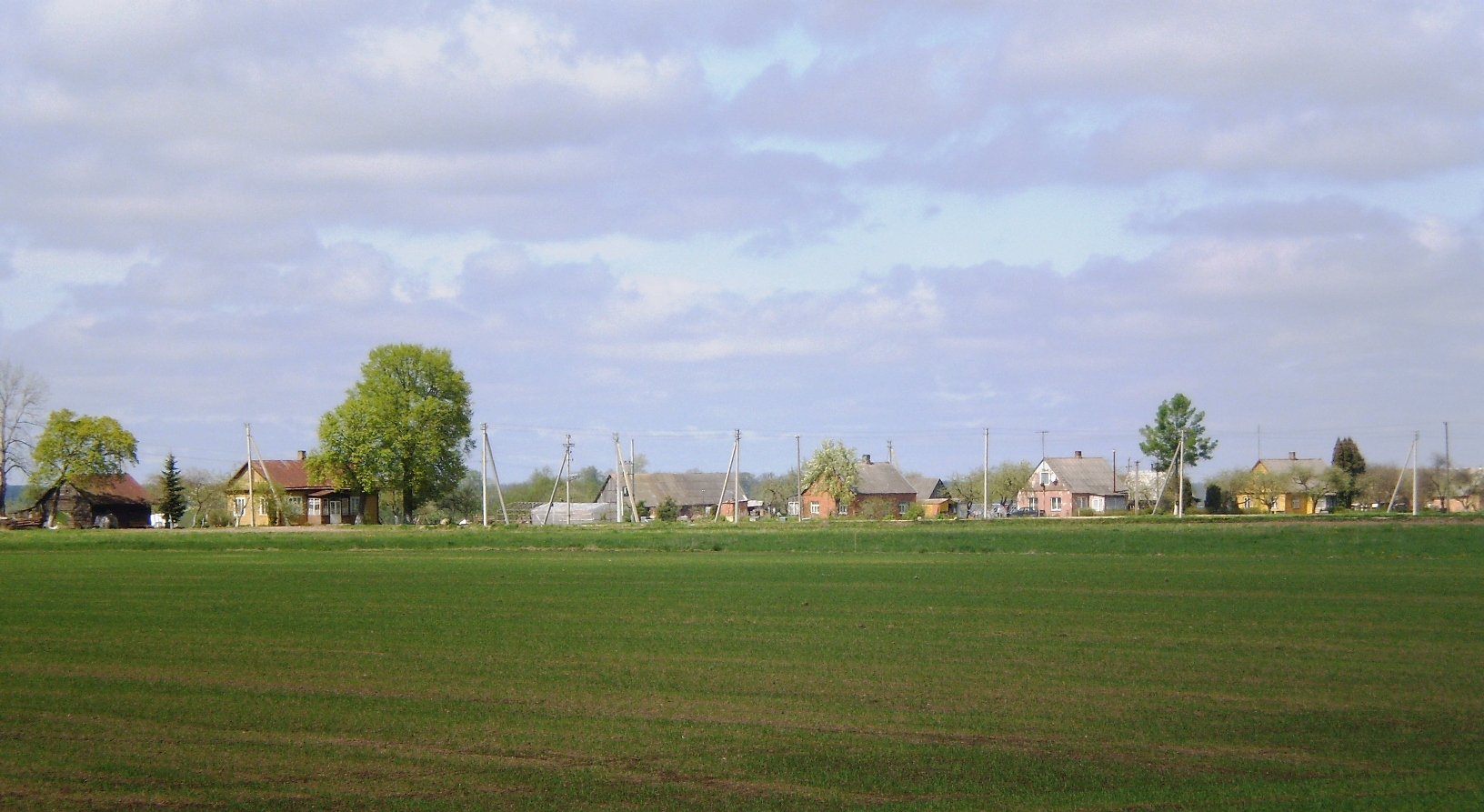

- Location in Lithuania Gineitai (Lithuania)
- Coordinates: 55°22′30″N 24°01′19″E
- Country: Lithuania
- County: Kaunas County
- Municipality: Kėdainiai district municipality
- Eldership: Vilainiai Eldership

Population (2011)
  - Total: 63
- Time zone: UTC+2 (EET)
  - Summer (DST): UTC+3 (EEST)

Gineitai (formerly Russian: Гинейты, Polish: Ginejty) is a village in Kėdainiai district municipality, in Kaunas County, in central Lithuania. According to the 2011 census, the village had a population of 63 people. It is located 2.5 kilometres (1.6 mi) from Tiskūnai, on the bank of the Nevėžis river, by the road "Vilainiai-Krekenava".

== History ==
Gineitai formerly was a Sirutiškis manor property.

== Demography ==
Historical population

Year	Pop.	±% p.a.
1902	159	—
1923	165	+0.18%
1959	116	−0.97%
1970	116	+0.00%

Year	Pop.	±% p.a.
1979	68	−5.76%
1989	77	+1.25%
2001	71	−0.67%
2011	63	−1.19%

Source: 1902, 1923, 1959 & 1970, 1979, 1989, 2001, 2011
