= Ledai =

- Hamlet
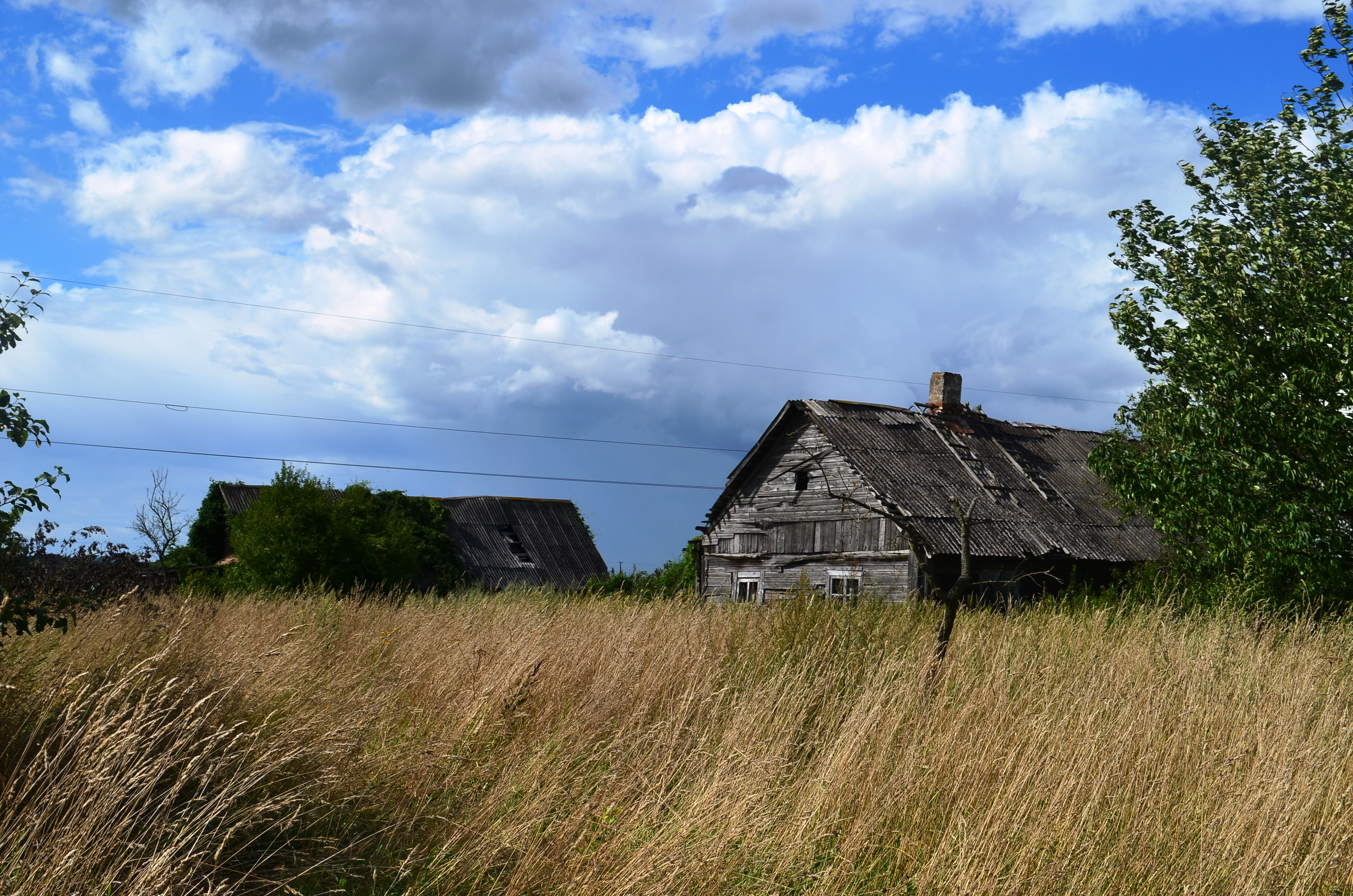

- Location in Lithuania Ledai (Lithuania)
- Coordinates: 55°19′06″N 24°01′10″E
- Country: Lithuania
- County: Kaunas County
- Municipality: Kėdainiai district municipality
- Eldership: Vilainiai Eldership

Population (2011)
  - Total: 0
- Time zone: UTC+2 (EET)
  - Summer (DST): UTC+3 (EEST)

Ledai (formerly Russian: Ляды) is a hamlet in Kėdainiai district municipality, in Kaunas County, in central Lithuania. According to the 2011 census, the hamlet was uninhabited. It is located 1 kilometre (0.62 mi) from Vilainiai, nearby the Vasariškiai collective gardening area.

It was a folwark till the mid-20th century.

== Demography ==
Historical population

| Year | Pop. | ±% p.a. |
|---|---|---|
| 1902 | 11 | — |
| 1923 | 29 | +4.72% |
| 1959 | 17 | −1.47% |
| 1970 | 16 | −0.55% |

| Year | Pop. | ±% p.a. |
|---|---|---|
| 1979 | 8 | −7.41% |
| 1989 | 0 | −100.00% |
| 2001 | 3 | — |
| 2011 | 0 | −100.00% |

Source: 1902, 1923, 1959 & 1970, 1979, 1989, 2001, 2011
