= Vilainiai Eldership =

Vilainiai Eldership Vilainių seniūnija
- Eldership
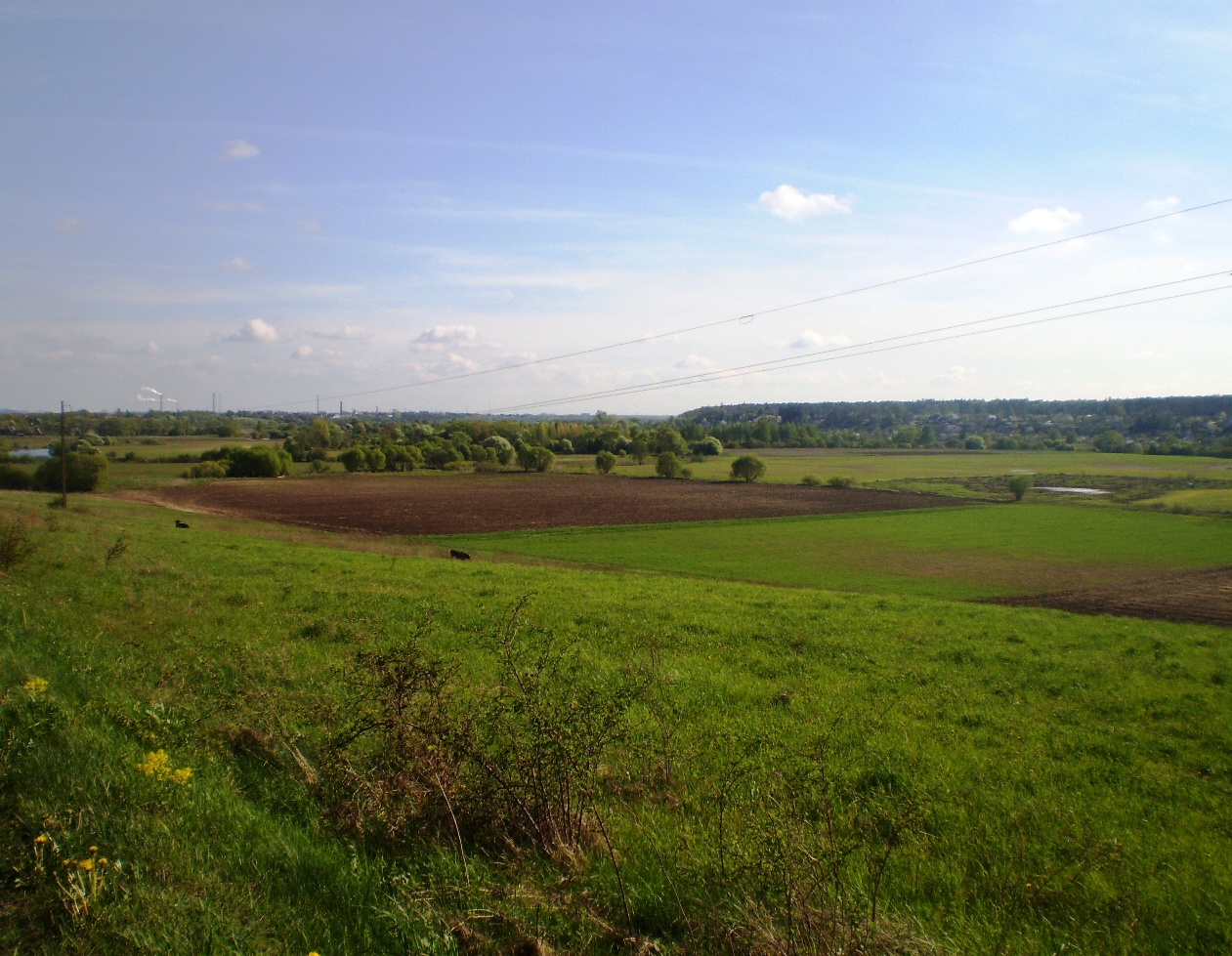
- Nevėžis valley nearby Apytalaukis

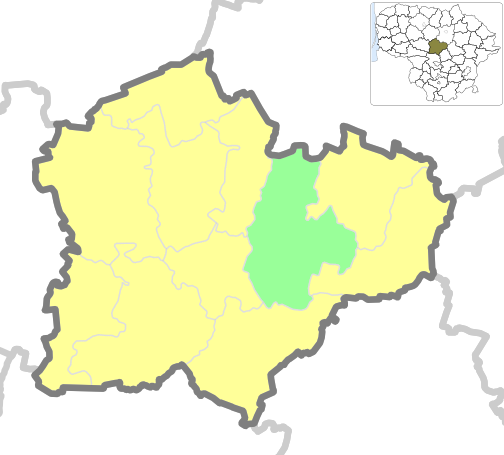
- Location of Vilainiai Eldership
- Country: Lithuania
- Ethnographic region: Aukštaitija
- County: Kaunas County
- Municipality: Kėdainiai District Municipality
- Administrative centre: Vilainiai

Area
  - Total: 179 km^{2} (69 sq mi)

Population (2011)
  - Total: 3,618
  - Density: 20.2/km^{2} (52.3/sq mi)
- Time zone: UTC+2 (EET)
  - Summer (DST): UTC+3 (EEST)

Vilainiai Eldership (Lithuanian: Vilainių seniūnija) is a Lithuanian eldership, located in the central-northern part of Kėdainiai District Municipality.

Eldership was created in 2001, as a result of the merging of Aristava Eldership and part of Kėdainiai City Eldership.

== Geography ==
The territory of Vilainiai Eldership is located mostly in the Nevėžis Plain and the Nevėžis river valley. The relief is mostly flat and cultivated as agriculture lands. The eastern side is covered by forests.

- Rivers: Nevėžis, Malčius, Obelis, Žalesys, Suleva, Alkupis.
- Lakes and ponds: Bubliai Reservoir, Juodkiškiai Reservoir.
- Forests: Lančiūnava-Šventybrastis Forest.
- Protected areas: Lančiūnava Forest Botanical Sanctuary, Šventybrastis Landscape Sanctuary, Lančiūnava Forest Biosphere Polygon.
- Nature monuments: Šventybrastis Oak Trees

== Places of interest ==
- Catholic churches in Apytalaukis, Lančiūnava and Šventybrastis
- Manors of Lančiūnava, Apytalaukis, Stasinė
- Manor sites in Aristavėlė and Zavišinė
- Czesław Miłosz and Juozas Urbšys birth places in Šeteniai
- The January Uprising rebels graves in Šventybrastis
- Former cemetery site in Dvarčininkai
- Povilas Lukšys death place in Taučiūnai
- Soviet mosaic the "Tree" in Lančiūnava

== Populated places ==
Following settlements are located in the Vilainiai Eldership (as for the 2011 census):

- Villages: Alksnėnai · Apytalaukis · Aristava · Aristavėlė · Bajėniškis · Baliniai · Bičkai · Bubleliai · Bubliai · Bučioniai · Būdai · Daukainiai · Dilgiai · Dvarčininkai · Džiugailiai · Galkantai · Gineitai · Girelė · Grąžčiai · Katkai · Kėžiai · Koliupė · Kūjėnai · Laiveliai · Lančiūnava · Lepšynė · Marijanka · Medvėdai · Melagiai · Melninkai ·Milžemiai · Norušiai · Peiksva · Pliupai · Puplaukiai · Repengiai · Rudžiai · Skerdikai · Stasinė · Stebuliai · Stuobriai · Šeteniai · Šlaitkalnis · Šventybrastis · Taučiūnai · Tiskūnai · Užlukiai · Užmiškis · Valkaičiai · Vasariškiai · Vilainiai · Zavišinė · Zutkiai
- Hamlets: Antapolis · Gegužinė · Juodkiškiai · Ledai · Pagojys · Pušinė
- Former settlements: Pracauninkai
