= Repengiai =

- Village
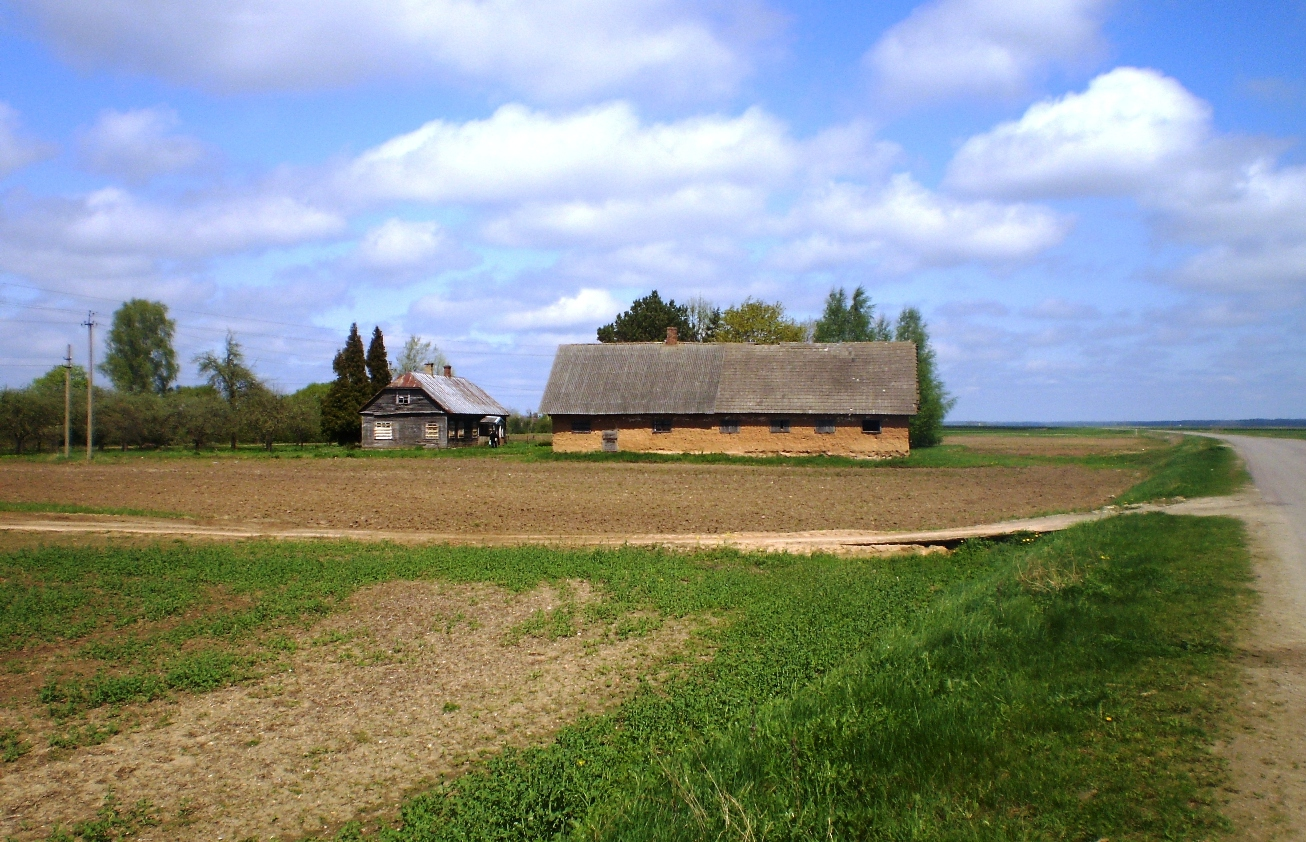

- Location in Lithuania Repengiai (Lithuania)
- Coordinates: 55°21′50″N 24°01′19″E
- Country: Lithuania
- County: Kaunas County
- Municipality: Kėdainiai district municipality
- Eldership: Vilainiai Eldership

Population (2011)
  - Total: 4
- Time zone: UTC+2 (EET)
  - Summer (DST): UTC+3 (EEST)

Repengiai (formerly Russian: Репенги) is a village in Kėdainiai district municipality, in Kaunas County, in central Lithuania. According to the 2011 census, the village had a population of 7 people. It is located 1 kilometre (0.62 mi) from Tiskūnai, on the left bank of the Nevėžis river.

Repengiai has been mentioned since 1592.

== Demography ==
Historical population

Year	Pop.	±% p.a.
1866	29	—
1902	47	+1.35%
1923	33	−1.67%
1959	35	+0.16%
1970	34	−0.26%

Year	Pop.	±% p.a.
1979	19	−6.26%
1986	13	−5.28%
1989	14	+2.50%
2001	15	+0.58%
2011	7	−7.34%

Source: 1902, 1923, 1959 & 1970, 1979, 1989, 2001, 2011
