= Bičkai =

- Village
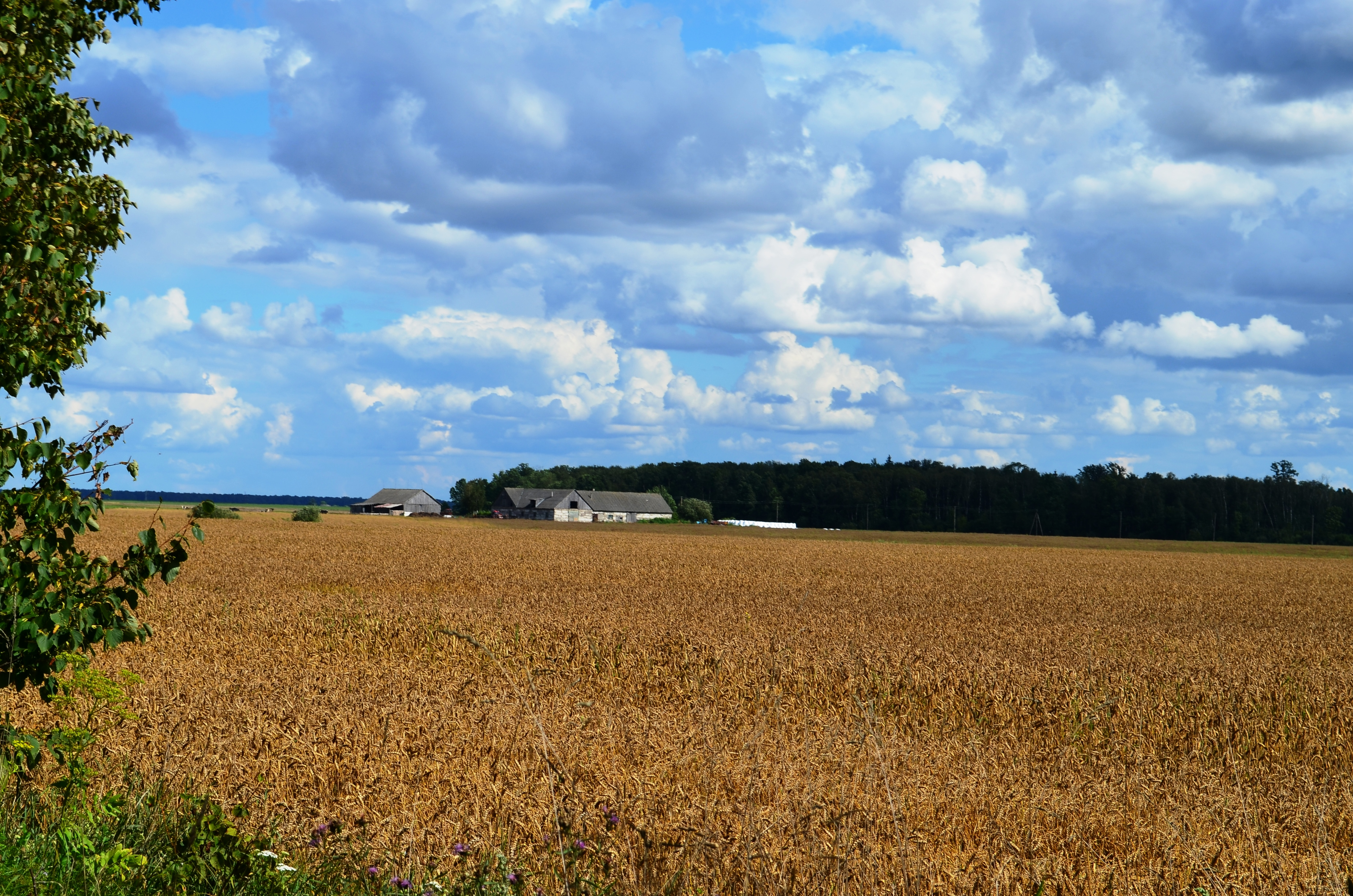

- Location in Lithuania Bičkai (Lithuania)
- Coordinates: 55°19′01″N 24°02′20″E
- Country: Lithuania
- County: Kaunas County
- Municipality: Kėdainiai district municipality
- Eldership: Vilainiai Eldership

Population (2011)
  - Total: 7
- Time zone: UTC+2 (EET)
  - Summer (DST): UTC+3 (EEST)

Bičkai (formerly Russian: Бычки, Polish: Byczki) is a village in Kėdainiai district municipality, in Kaunas County, in central Lithuania. According to the 2011 census, the village had a population of 7 people. It is located 2 kilometres (1.2 mi) from Vilainiai, by the Koliupė and the Alkupis rivers, next to the Vilainiai Forest.

== Demography ==
Historical population

Year	Pop.	±% p.a.
1902	126	—
1923	144	+0.64%
1959	81	−1.59%
1970	69	−1.45%

Year	Pop.	±% p.a.
1979	16	−14.99%
1989	0	−100.00%
2001	0	0.00%
2011	7	—

Source: 1902, 1923, 1959 & 1970, 1979, 1989, 2001, 2011
