= Apytalaukis =

- Village
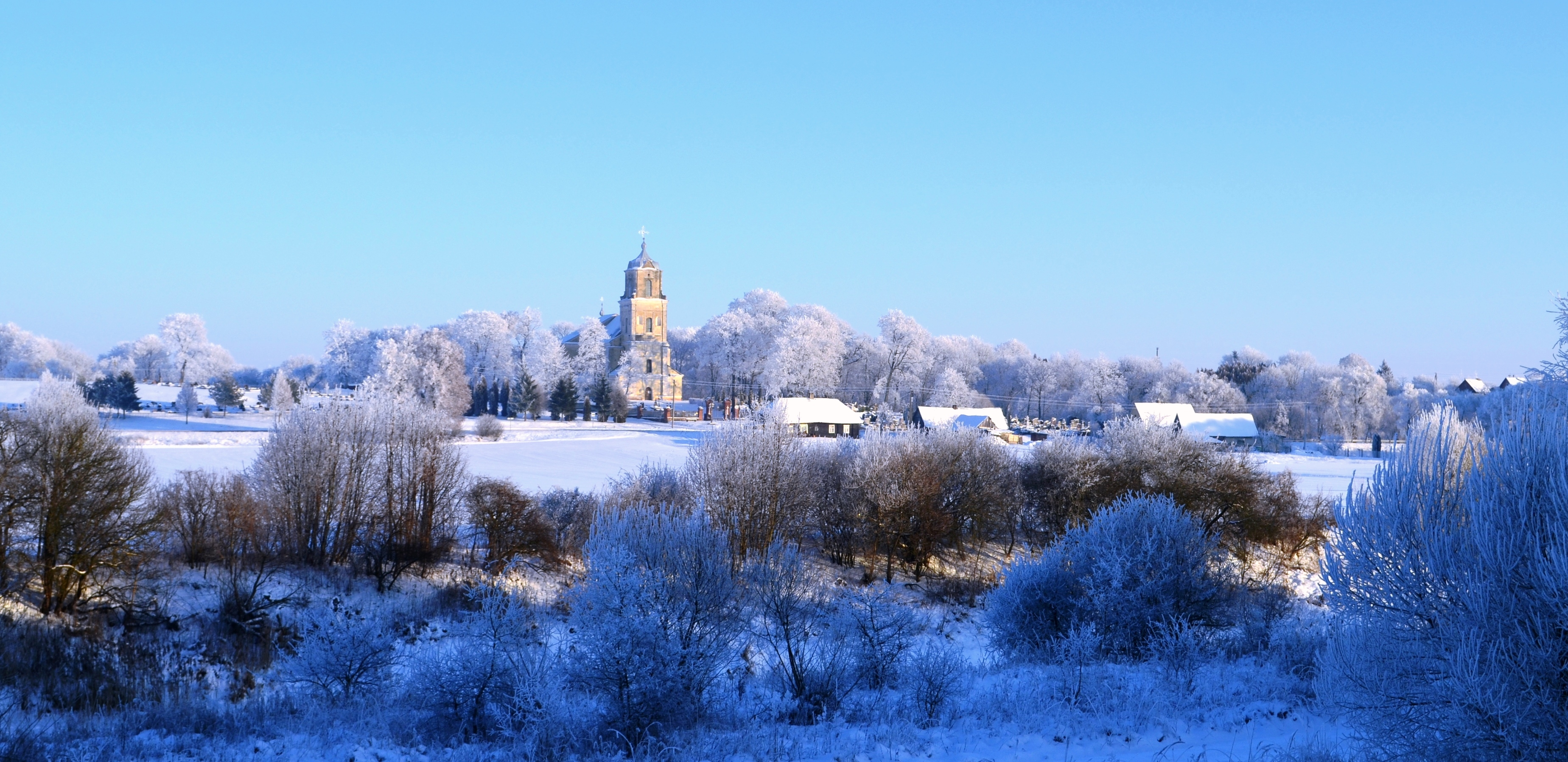

- Location in Lithuania Apytalaukis (Lithuania)
- Coordinates: 55°19′52″N 24°01′08″E
- Country: Lithuania
- County: Kaunas County
- Municipality: Kėdainiai district municipality
- Eldership: Vilainiai Eldership

Population (2011)
  - Total: 91
- Time zone: UTC+2 (EET)
  - Summer (DST): UTC+3 (EEST)

Apytalaukis (formerly Russian: Опитолоки, Polish: Opitołoki) is a village in Kėdainiai district municipality, in Kaunas County, in central Lithuania. According to the 2011 census, the village had 91 residents. It is located 5 kilometres (3.1 mi) from Kėdainiai, on the left bank of the Nevėžis river, by the Alkupis mouth. There is a Catholic church of St. Peter and St. Paul (built in 1635) with a graveyard, a manor palace (built in 1850) with a park. There is a collective gardening area (Vasariškiai) nearr Apytalaukis.

== History ==
Apytalaukis has been known since 1371 when it was mentioned by Hermann von Wartberge. The Apytalaukis Manor has been known since the 15th century. A school was established in the manor in 1811. The manor was a property of the Tyszkiewicz and the Zabiela families in the 19th century. In 1976, a psycho-neurological boarding school was established in the manor.

== Demography ==
Historical population

Year	Pop.	±% p.a.
1859	82	—
1902	187	+1.94%
1923	161	−0.71%
1959	288	+1.63%
1970	300	+0.37%
1974	304	+0.33%

Year	Pop.	±% p.a.
1979	293	−0.73%
1984	292	−0.07%
1989	261	−2.22%
2001	215	−1.60%
2011	91	−8.24%

Source: 1902, 1923, 1959 & 1970, 1979, 1989, 2001, 2011

== Images ==
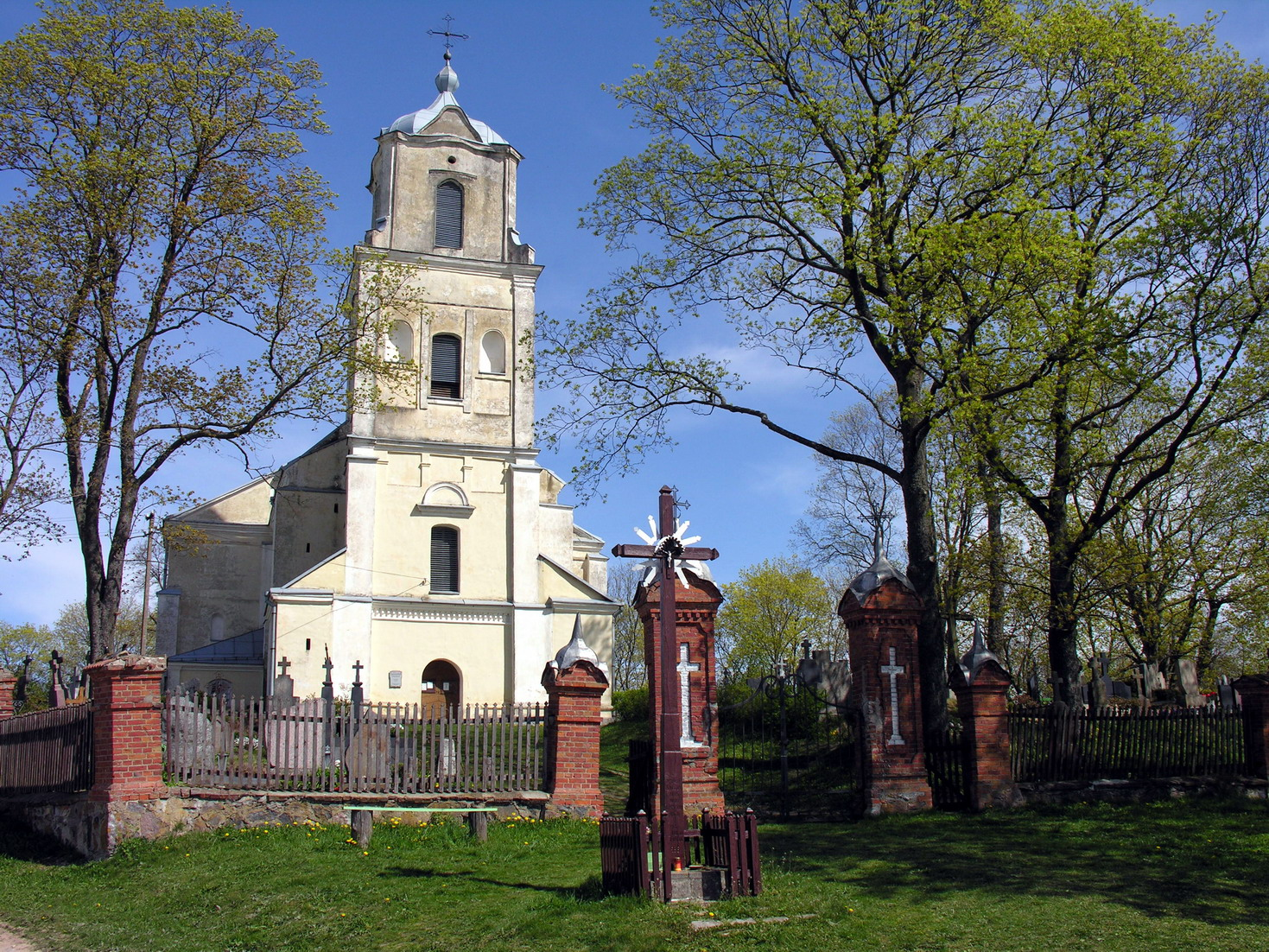
Apytalaukis church

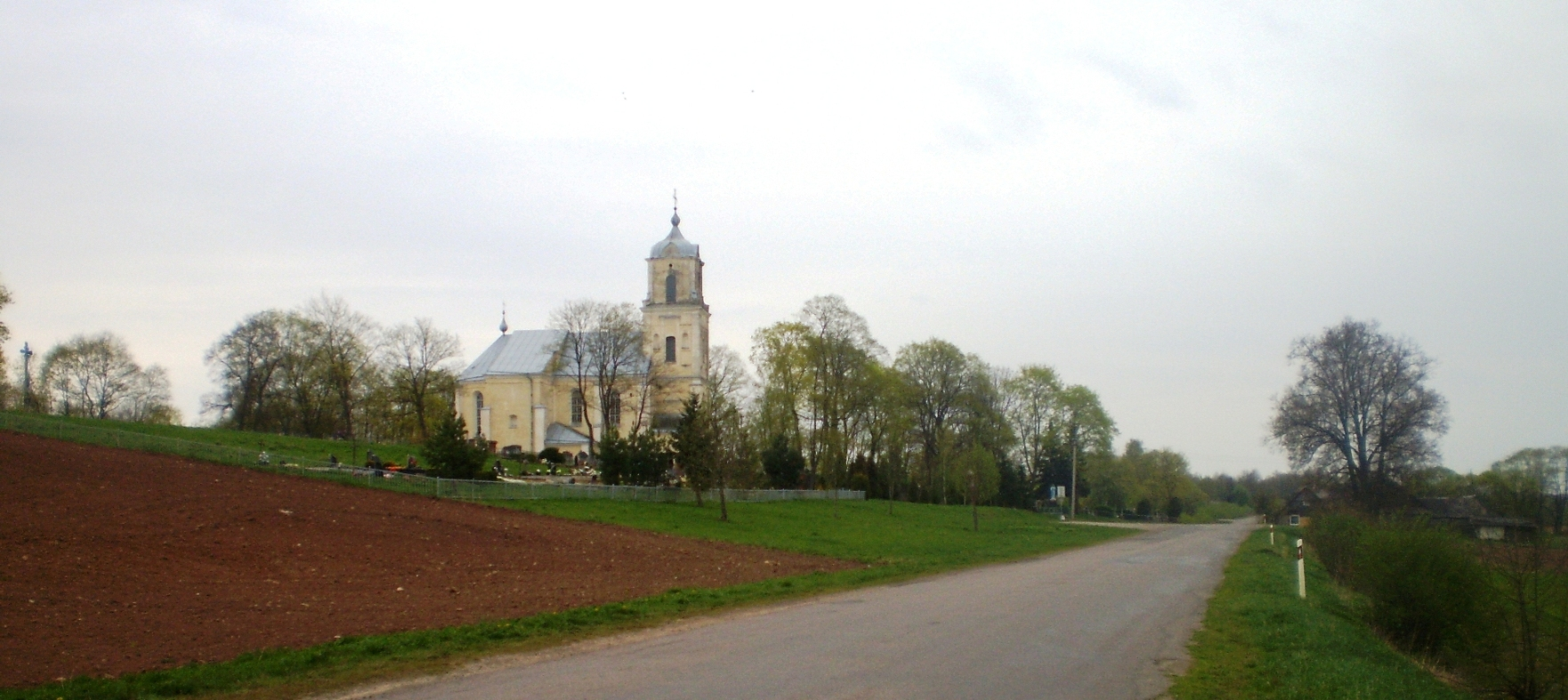
Road through Apytalaukis

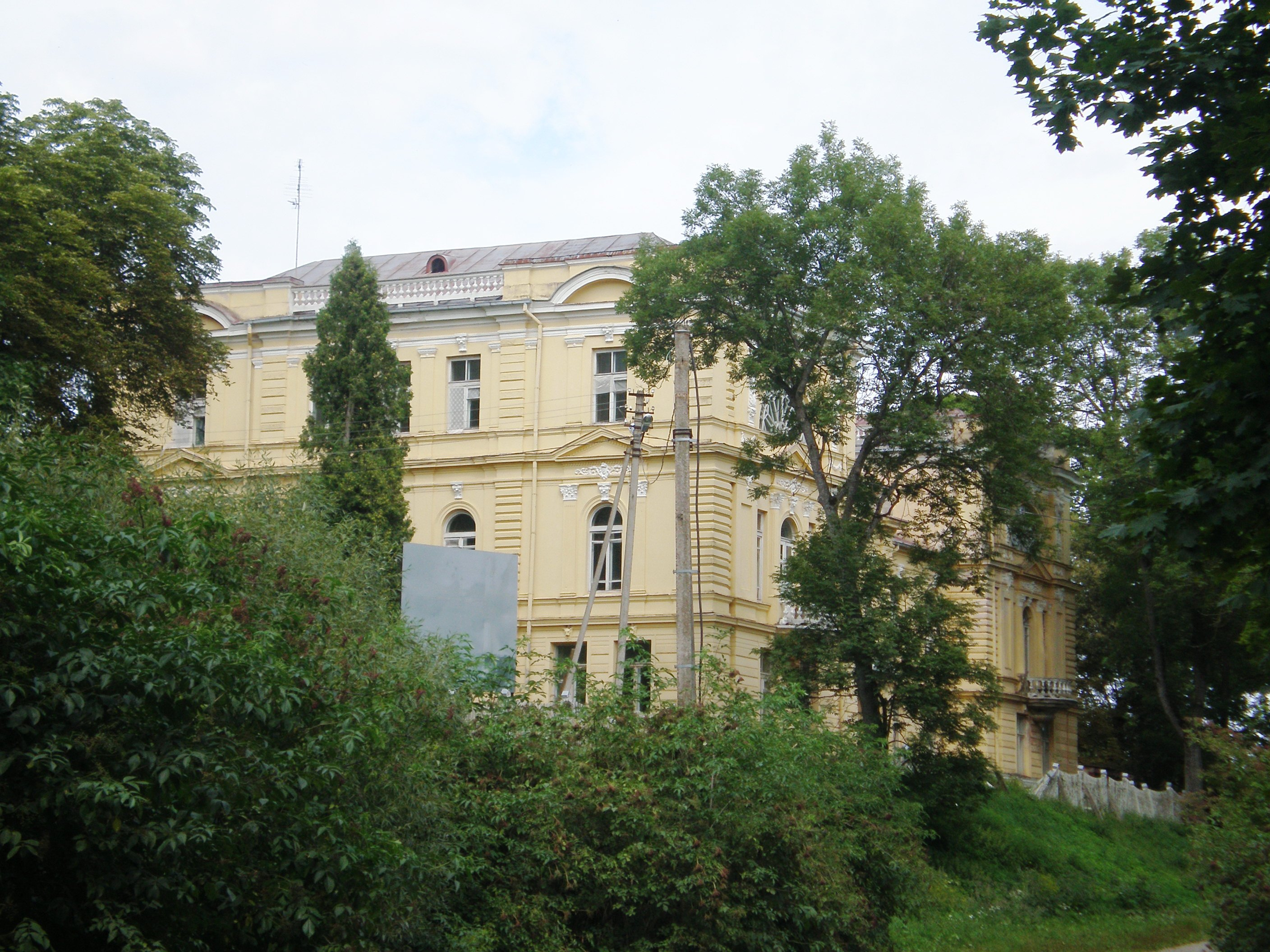
Apytalaukis Manor
