= Lepšynė =

- Village
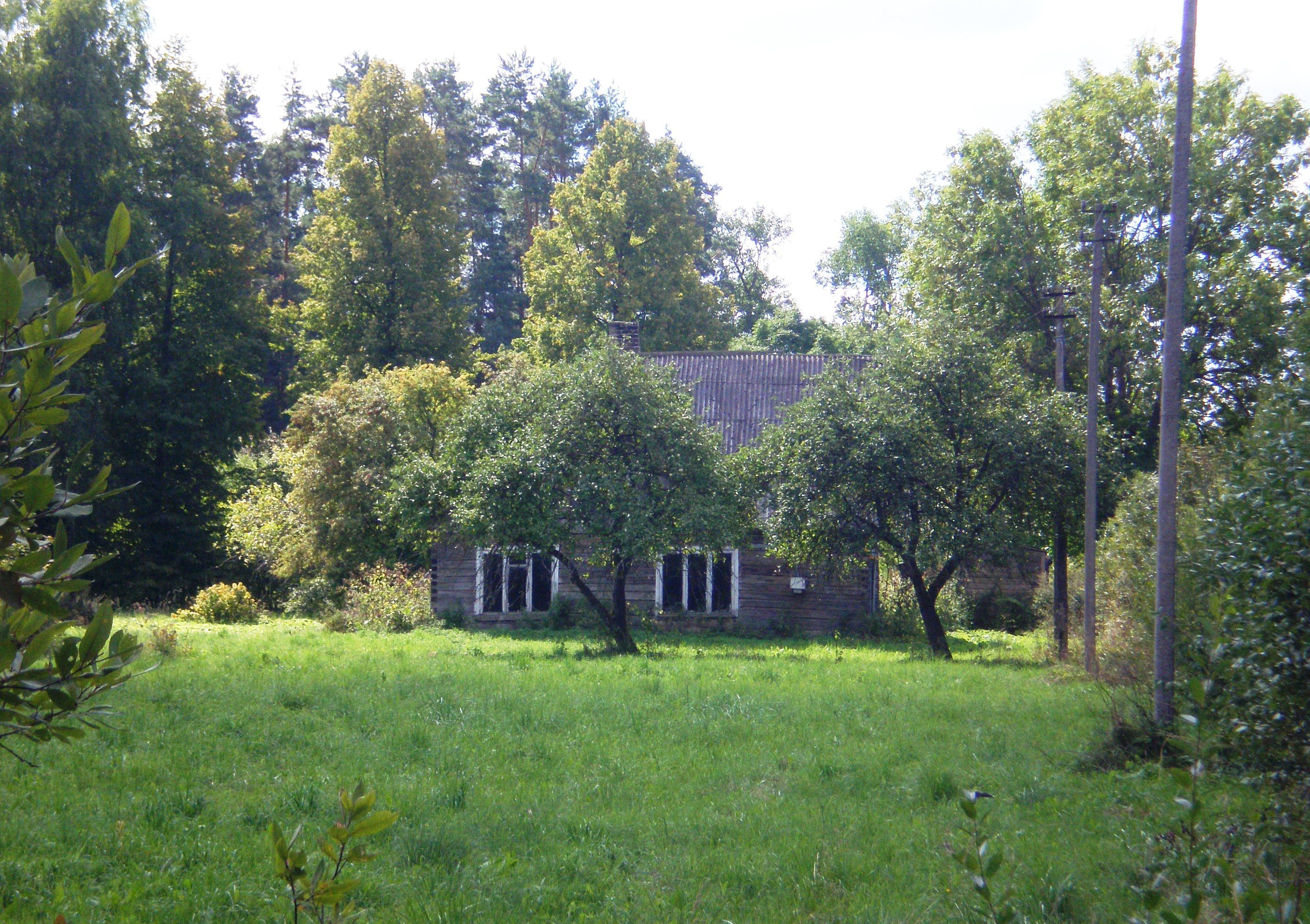

- Location in Lithuania Lepšynė (Lithuania)
- Coordinates: 55°24′0″N 24°05′10″E
- Country: Lithuania
- County: Kaunas County
- Municipality: Kėdainiai district municipality
- Eldership: Vilainiai Eldership

Population (2011)
  - Total: 0
- Time zone: UTC+2 (EET)
  - Summer (DST): UTC+3 (EEST)

Lepšynė ('birch bolete place', formerly Russian: Ляпшине, Polish: Lapszynie) is a village in Kėdainiai district municipality, in Kaunas County, in central Lithuania. According to the 2011 census, the village was uninhabited. It is located 3 kilometres (1.9 mi) from Šventybrastis, surrounded by the Lančiūnava-Šventybrastis Forest, nearby the Alkupis river.

== History ==
Lepšynė was an estate of the Stankevičiai family at the beginning of the 20th century.

== Demography ==
Historical population

Year	Pop.	±% p.a.
1902	14	—
1923	21	+1.95%
1959	39	+1.73%
1970	22	−5.07%

Year	Pop.	±% p.a.
1979	8	−10.63%
1989	0	−100.00%
2001	5	—
2011	0	−100.00%

Source: 1902, 1923, 1959 & 1970, 1979, 1989, 2001, 2011
