= Galkantai =

- Village
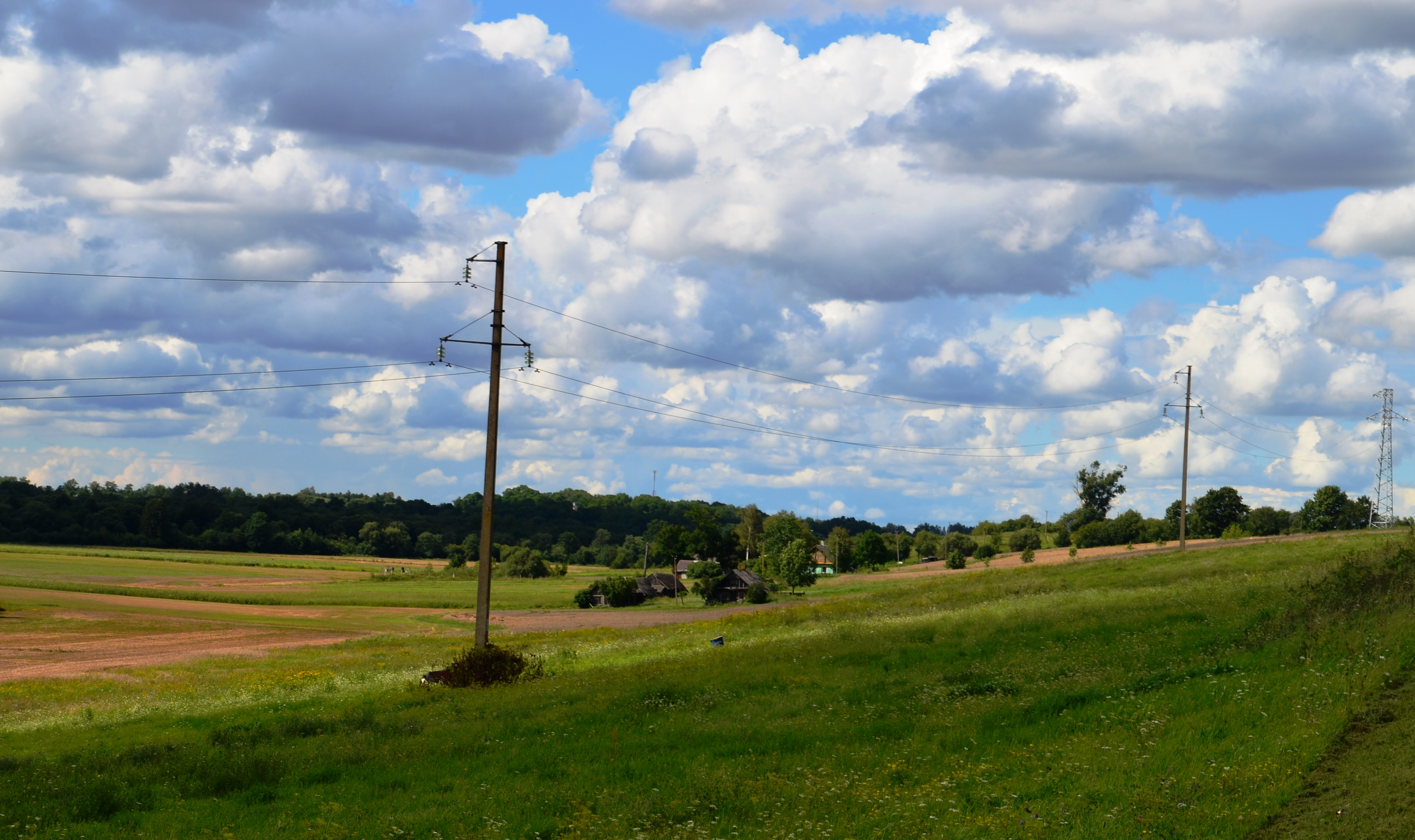

- Location in Lithuania Galkantai (Lithuania)
- Coordinates: 55°20′53″N 24°00′04″E
- Country: Lithuania
- County: Kaunas County
- Municipality: Kėdainiai district municipality
- Eldership: Vilainiai Eldership

Population (2011)
  - Total: 12
- Time zone: UTC+2 (EET)
  - Summer (DST): UTC+3 (EEST)

Galkantai (formerly Russian: Гольконты, Polish: Golkonty) is a village in Kėdainiai district municipality, in Kaunas County, in central Lithuania. According to the 2011 census, the village had a population of 12 people. It is located 1 kilometre (0.62 mi) from Tiskūnai, between the Nevėžis river and the road "Vilainiai-Krekenava".

== History ==
Galkantai has been known since the 17th century. At the end of the 19th century it was a property of the Wejsberg, Ławrynowycz and Pietrusiewicz families in the former Sirutiškis manor property.

== Demography ==
Historical population

| Year | Pop. | ±% p.a. |
|---|---|---|
| 1902 | 70 | — |
| 1923 | 89 | +1.15% |
| 1959 | 56 | −1.28% |
| 1970 | 47 | −1.58% |

| Year | Pop. | ±% p.a. |
|---|---|---|
| 1979 | 33 | −3.85% |
| 1989 | 29 | −1.28% |
| 2001 | 25 | −1.23% |
| 2011 | 12 | −7.08% |

Source: 1902, 1923, 1959 & 1970, 1979, 1989, 2001, 2011
