= Alkupis =

Alkupis (from the Lithuanian 'river of alka') could refer to several Lithuanian toponyms:

- Alkupis, village in Šilalė District Municipality

Several short rivers, the largest of them:

- Alkupis (Nevėžis tributary), the Nevėžis tributary in Kėdainiai District Municipality.
