= Dilgiai =

- Village
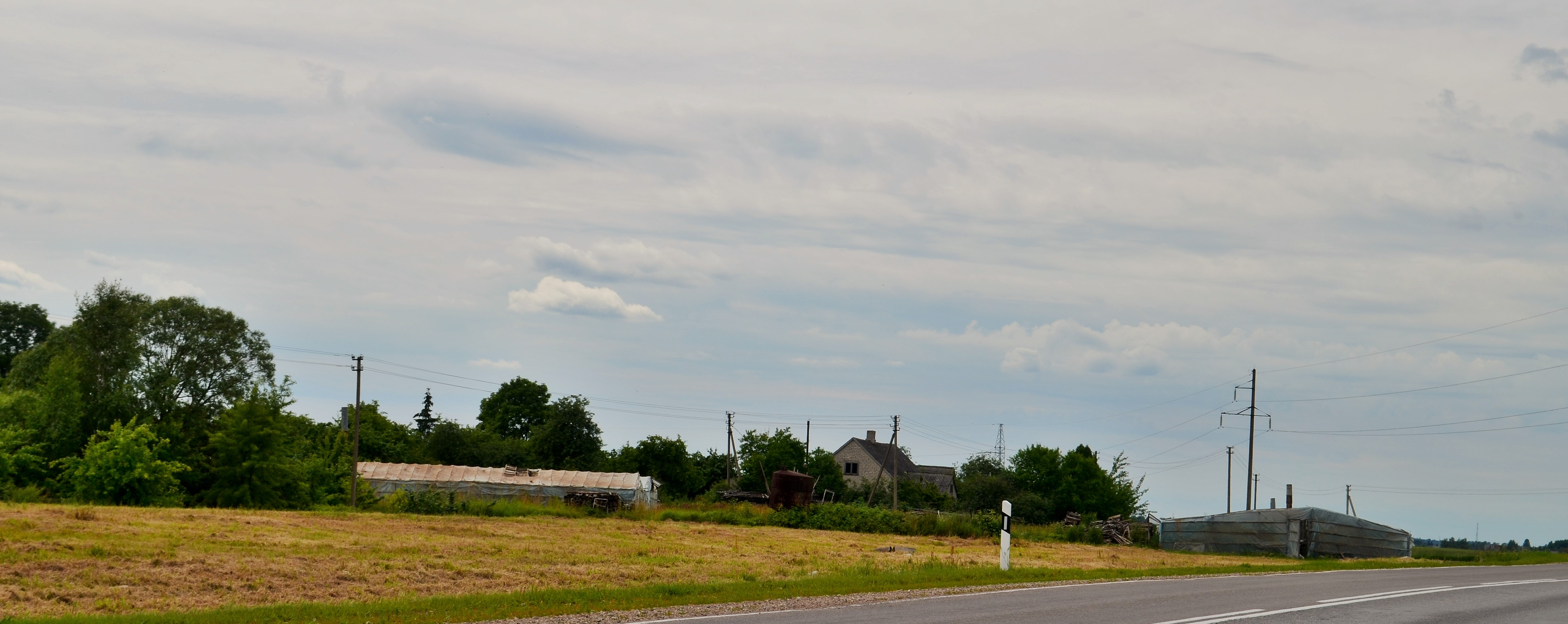

- Location in Lithuania Dilgiai (Lithuania)
- Coordinates: 55°17′49″N 24°02′31″E
- Country: Lithuania
- County: Kaunas County
- Municipality: Kėdainiai district municipality
- Eldership: Vilainiai Eldership

Population (2011)
  - Total: 1
- Time zone: UTC+2 (EET)
  - Summer (DST): UTC+3 (EEST)

Dilgiai (formerly Russian: Дыльги, Polish: Dylgi) is a village in Kėdainiai district municipality, in Kaunas County, in central Lithuania. According to the 2011 census, the village had a population of 1 person. It is located 3 kilometres (1.9 mi) from Aristava, by the KK229 road, next to the Juodkiškiai Reservoir.

At the end of the 19th century Dilgiai was a property of the Aristava Manor of the Medekšos family.

== Demography ==
Historical population

Year	Pop.	±% p.a.
1902	34	—
1923	72	+3.64%
1959	75	+0.11%
1970	40	−5.55%

Year	Pop.	±% p.a.
1979	3	−25.01%
1989	2	−3.97%
2001	2	+0.00%
2011	1	−6.70%

Source: 1902, 1923, 1959 & 1970, 1979, 1989, 2001, 2011
