= Alksnėnai, Vilainiai =

Alksnėnai
- Village
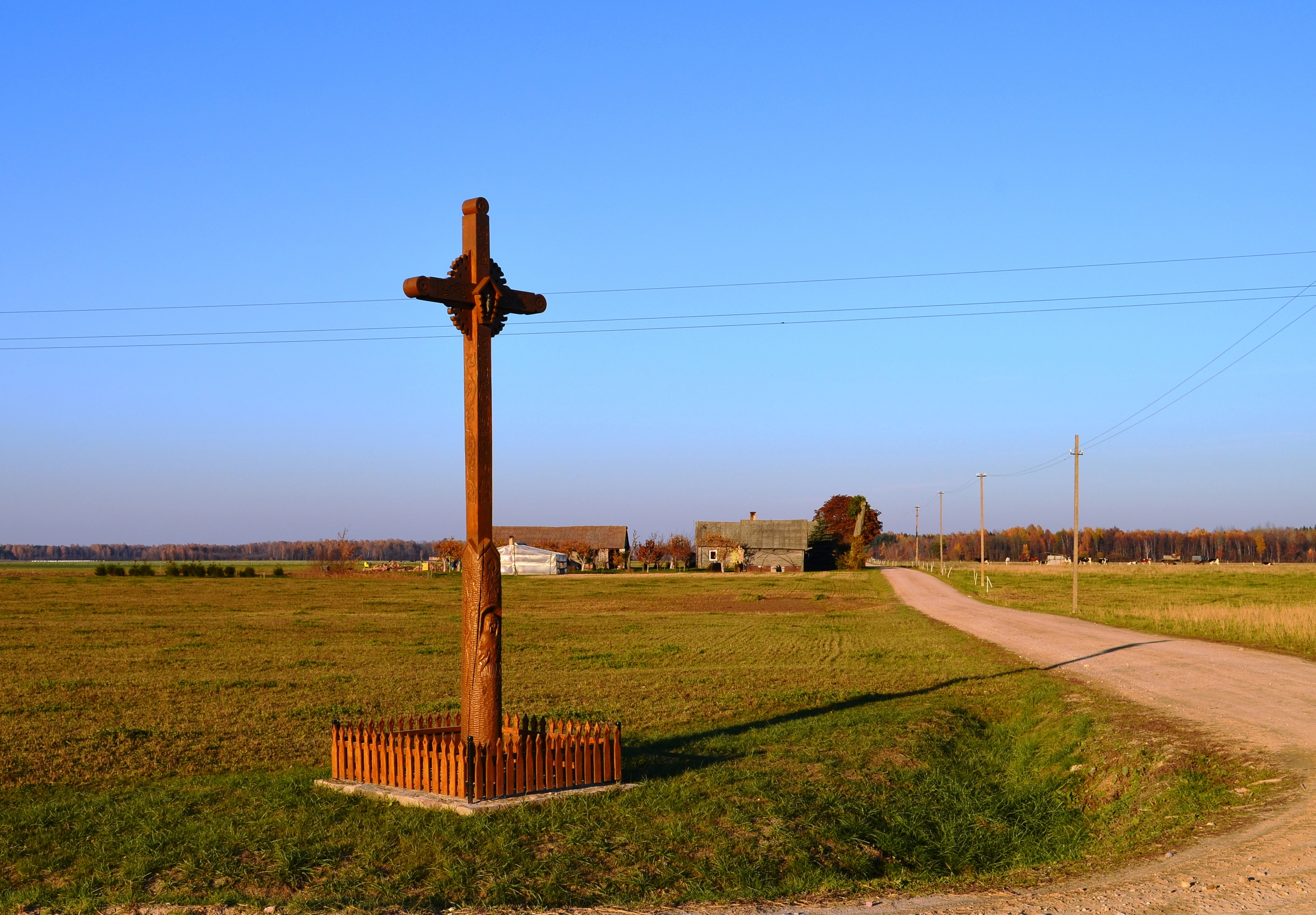

- Location in Lithuania Alksnėnai (Lithuania)
- Coordinates: 55°21′11″N 24°07′52″E
- Country: Lithuania
- County: Kaunas County
- Municipality: Kėdainiai district municipality
- Eldership: Vilainiai Eldership

Population (2011)
  - Total: 5
- Time zone: UTC+2 (EET)
  - Summer (DST): UTC+3 (EEST)

Alksnėnai (formerly Gaižmėnai, Russian: Гойжмяны, Polish: Gojżmiany) is a village in Kėdainiai district municipality, in Kaunas County, in central Lithuania. According to the 2011 census, the village had a population of 5 people. It is located 3 kilometres (1.9 mi) from Lančiūnava, nearby the Lančiūnava-Šventybrastis Forest.

== Demography ==
Historical population

Year	Pop.	±% p.a.
1959	47	—
1970	41	−1.23%
1979	17	−9.32%

Year	Pop.	±% p.a.
1989	1	−24.67%
2001	5	+14.35%
2011	5	+0.00%

Source: 1902, 1923, 1959 & 1970, 1979, 1989, 2001, 2011
