= Laiveliai =

- Village
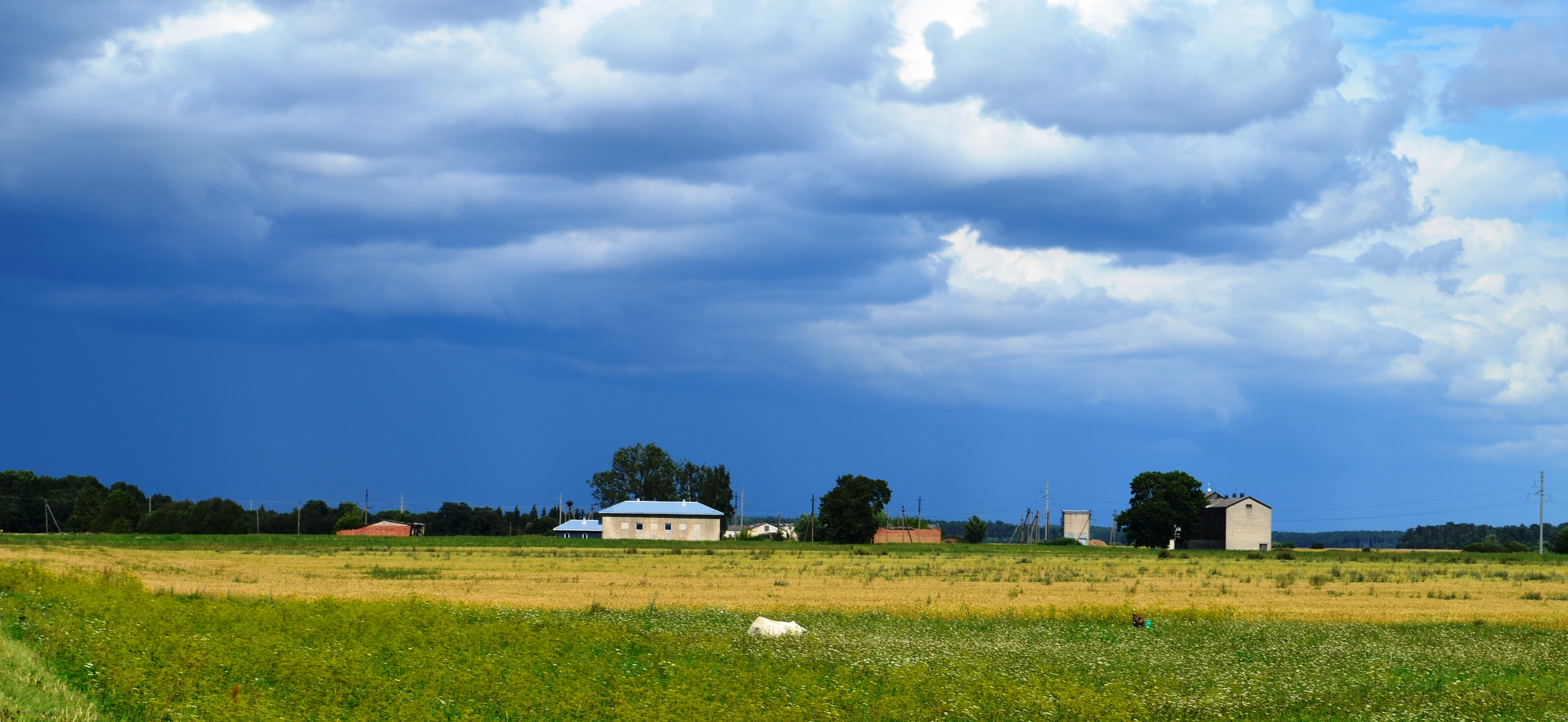

- Location in Lithuania Laiveliai (Lithuania)
- Coordinates: 55°25′01″N 24°02′31″E
- Country: Lithuania
- County: Kaunas County
- Municipality: Kėdainiai district municipality
- Eldership: Vilainiai Eldership

Population (2011)
  - Total: 0
- Time zone: UTC+2 (EET)
  - Summer (DST): UTC+3 (EEST)

Laiveliai (formerly Russian: Лайвишки, Polish: Łajwiszki) is a village in Kėdainiai district municipality, in Kaunas County, in central Lithuania. According to the 2011 census, the village was uninhabited. It is located 0.5 kilometres (0.31 mi) from Šventybrastis, by the Brasta river.

== History ==
Till 1863 it was owned by the Ignacgorodas estate (a property of the Geištarai family).

== Demography ==
Historical population

Year	Pop.	±% p.a.
1902	76	—
1923	61	−1.04%
1959	36	−1.45%
1970	20	−5.20%

Year	Pop.	±% p.a.
1979	9	−8.49%
1989	1	−19.73%
2001	0	−100.00%
2011	0	0.00%

Source: 1902, 1923, 1959 & 1970, 1979, 1989, 2001, 2011
