= Apytalaukis Manor =

Coordinates: 55°19′56″N 24°1′18″E

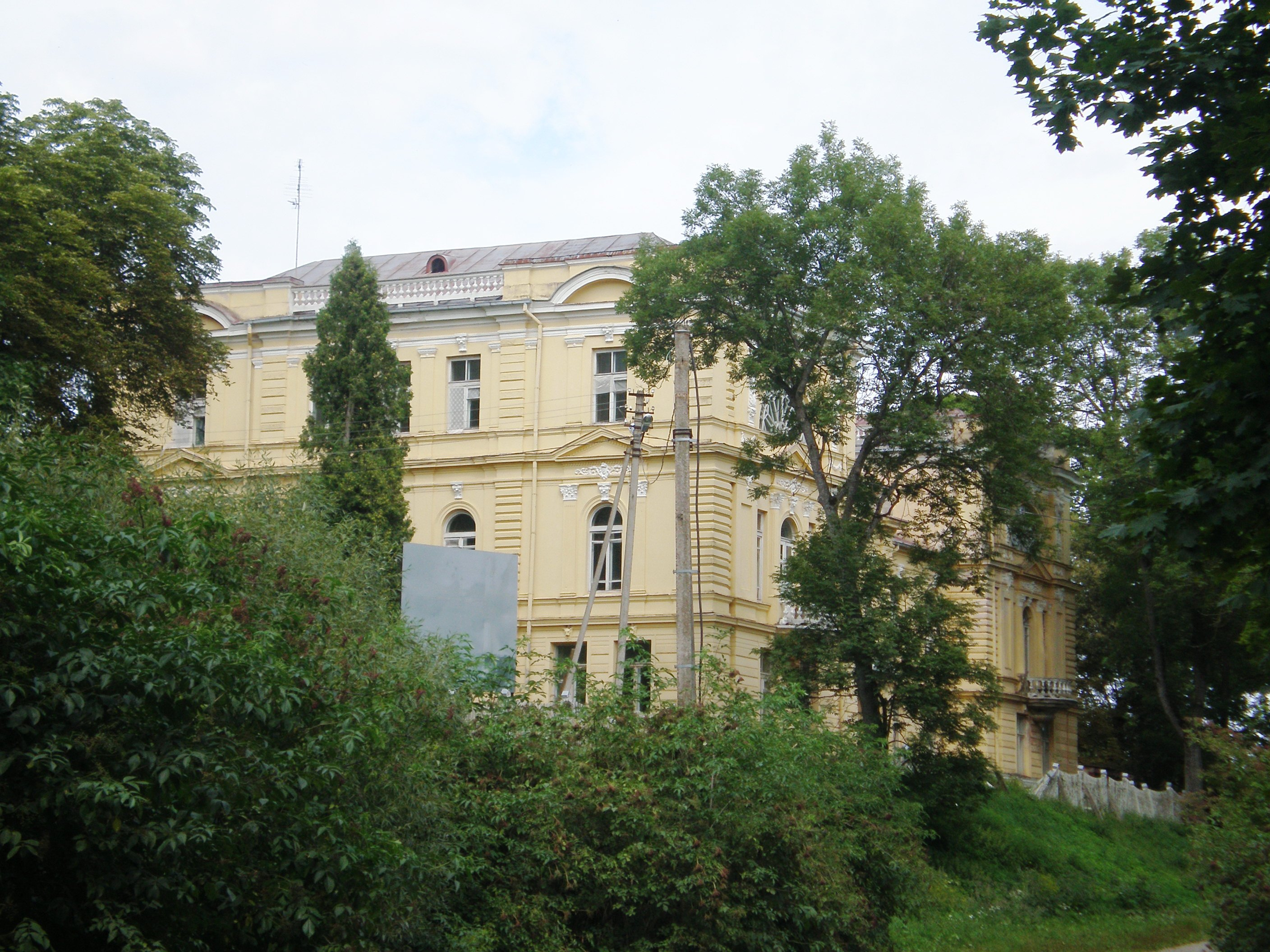
- Apytalaukis Manor
- Interactive map of the Apytalaukis Manor area

General information
- Type: Residential manor
- Location: Apytalaukis, Lithuania

Apytalaukis Manor or Zabielos Manor (Lithuanian: Apytalaukio dvaras; Zabielų dvaras) is a former residential manor in Apytalaukis village, Kėdainiai district, Lithuania.

== History ==
The manor was owned by Šiukštos, Karpiai, Tiškevičiai, Zabielos families. In the beginning of 18th century, Šiukšta built the first brick palace. In 1819, a park closely resembling an English garden was created. It was later expanded in the mid-19th century. By the initiative of Zabielos, the palace was rebuilt in 1850 and 1880 probably according to a project of the Polish architect Kozłowski. In front of the manor there is a decorative pool. After the Second World War the manor was rebuilt in 1954. In 1976, the manor became a psychoneurological boarding school and later served as pensionate for Kėdainiai. Currently Apytalaukis Manor is abandoned.

On 9 September 2022 abandoned Apytalaukis Manor was heavily damaged by fire.
