= Pliupai, Kėdainiai =

Pliupai
- Village
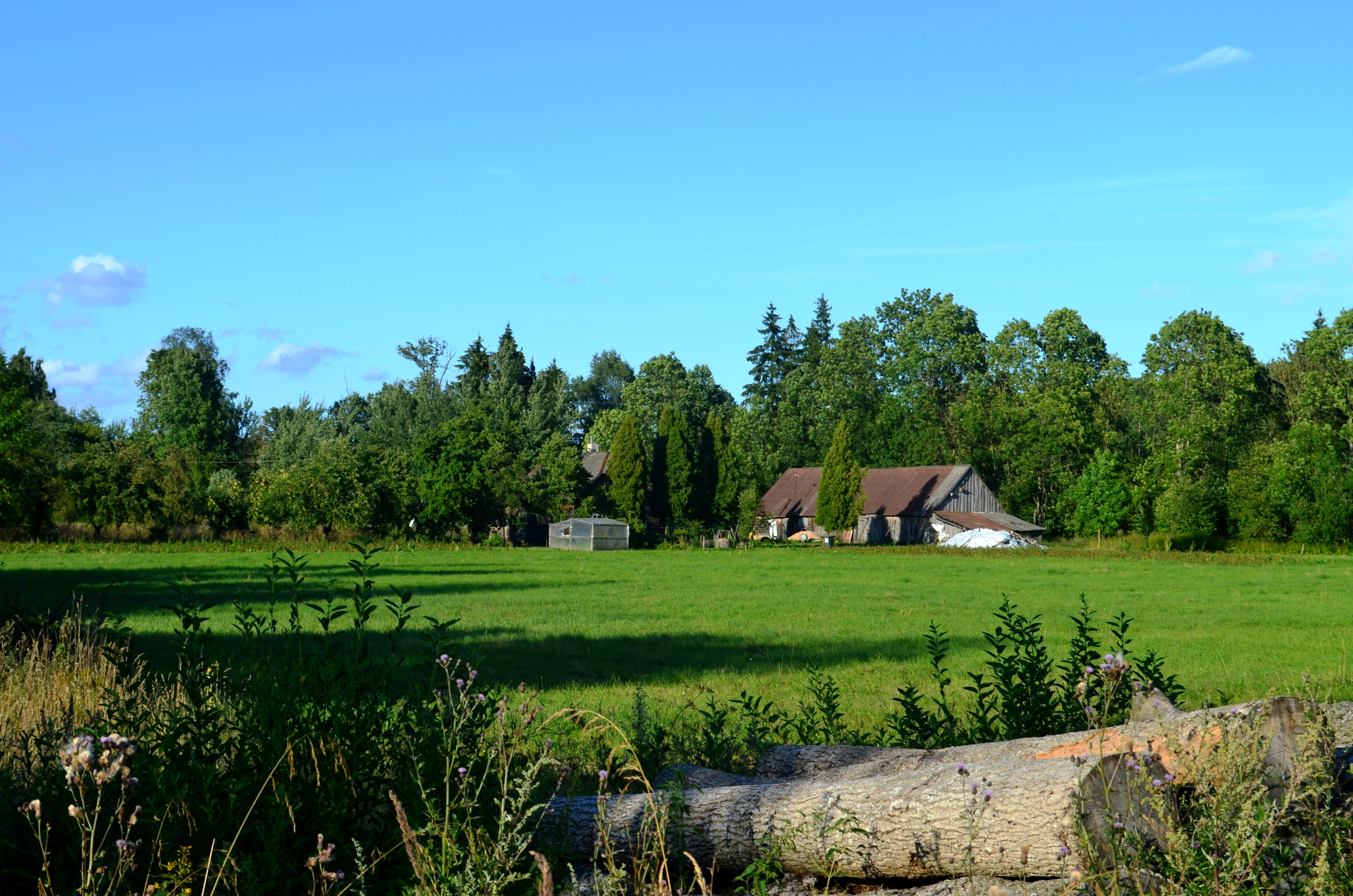

- Location in Lithuania Pliupai (Lithuania)
- Coordinates: 55°19′52″N 24°07′08″E
- Country: Lithuania
- County: Kaunas County
- Municipality: Kėdainiai district municipality
- Eldership: Vilainiai Eldership

Population (2011)
  - Total: 4
- Time zone: UTC+2 (EET)
  - Summer (DST): UTC+3 (EEST)

Pliupai (formerly Russian: Плюпы, Polish: Plupie) is a village in Kėdainiai district municipality, in Kaunas County, in central Lithuania. According to the 2011 census, the village had a population of 4 people. It is located 2.5 kilometres (1.6 mi) from Lančiūnava, by the Lančiūnava-Šventybrastis Forest, nearby the Drigantas river.

== Demography ==
Historical population

Year	Pop.	±% p.a.
1902	72	—
1923	99	+1.53%
1959	74	−0.81%
1970	82	+0.94%

Year	Pop.	±% p.a.
1979	10	−20.85%
1989	4	−8.76%
2001	5	+1.88%
2011	4	−2.21%

Source: 1902, 1923, 1959 & 1970, 1979, 1989, 2001, 2011
