= Bajėniškis =

- Village
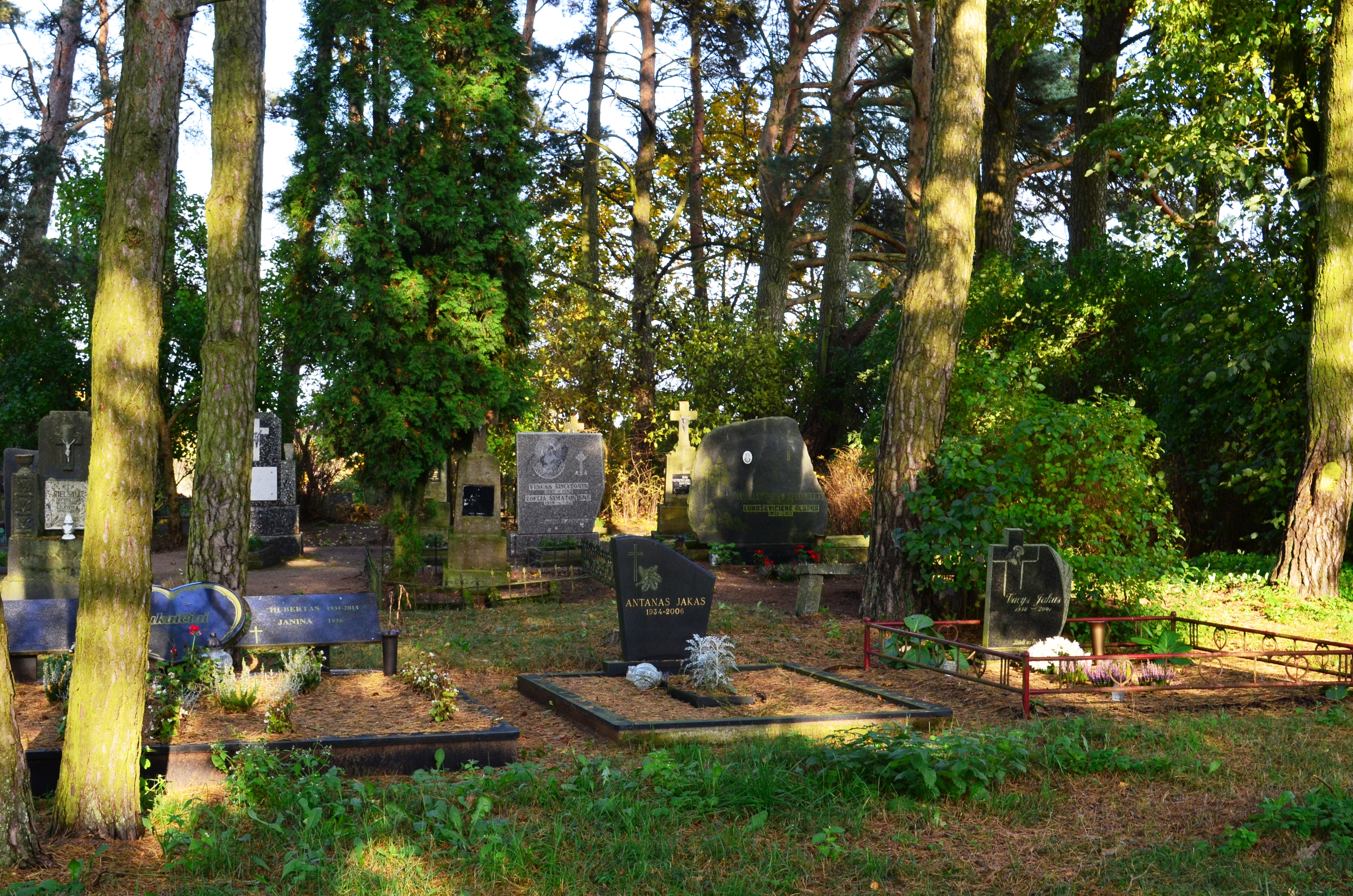

- Location in Lithuania Bajėniškis (Lithuania)
- Coordinates: 55°16′01″N 24°08′10″E
- Country: Lithuania
- County: Kaunas County
- Municipality: Kėdainiai district municipality
- Eldership: Vilainiai Eldership

Population (2011)
  - Total: 2
- Time zone: UTC+2 (EET)
  - Summer (DST): UTC+3 (EEST)

Bajėniškis (formerly Russian: Баіонишки) is a village in Kėdainiai district municipality, in Kaunas County, in central Lithuania. According to the 2011 census, the village had a population of 2 people. It is located 2 kilometres (1.2 mi) from Aristava, on the shore of the Bubliai Reservoir, by the Aukupė rivulet. There is a cemetery.

== Demography ==
Historical population

Year	Pop.	±% p.a.
1902	23	—
1923	9	−4.37%
1959	25	+2.88%
1970	9	−8.87%

Year	Pop.	±% p.a.
1979	12	+3.25%
1989	5	−8.38%
2001	2	−7.35%
2011	2	+0.00%

Source: 1902, 1923, 1959 & 1970, 1979, 1989, 2001, 2011
