= Šlaitkalnis =

- Village
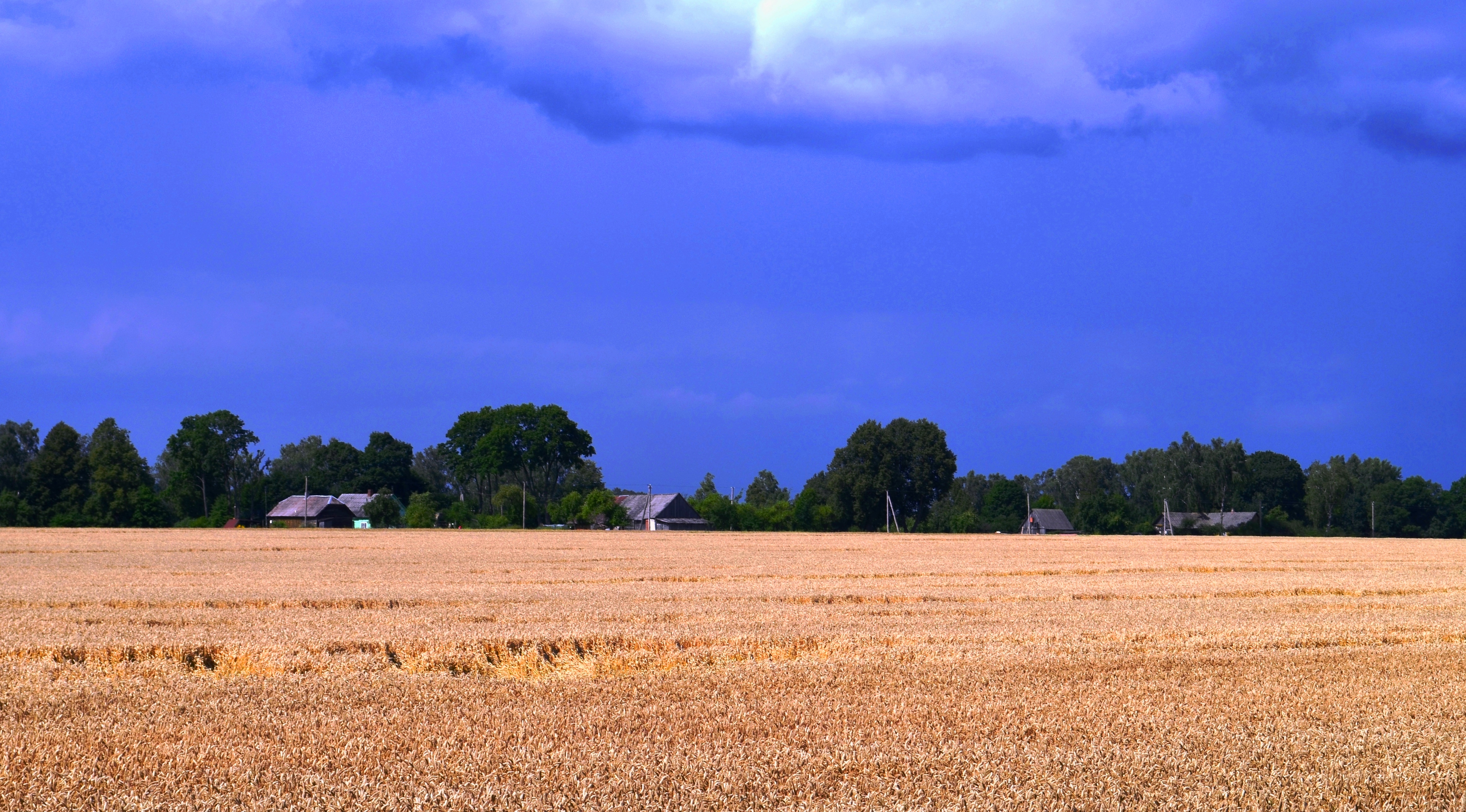

- Location in Lithuania Šlaitkalnis (Lithuania)
- Coordinates: 55°24′36″N 24°02′28″E
- Country: Lithuania
- County: Kaunas County
- Municipality: Kėdainiai district municipality
- Eldership: Vilainiai Eldership

Population (2011)
  - Total: 3
- Time zone: UTC+2 (EET)
  - Summer (DST): UTC+3 (EEST)

Šlaitkalnis is a village in Kėdainiai district municipality, in Kaunas County, in central Lithuania. According to the 2011 census, the village had a population of 3 people. It is located 0.2 kilometres (0.12 mi) from Šventybrastis, on the left bank of the Nevėžis river.

== Demography ==
Historical population

Year	Pop.	±% p.a.
1959	34	—
1970	46	+2.79%
1979	29	−5.00%

Year	Pop.	±% p.a.
1989	21	−3.18%
2001	23	+0.76%
2011	3	−18.43%

Source: 1902, 1923, 1959 & 1970, 1979, 1989, 2001, 2011
