= Stasinė =

- Village
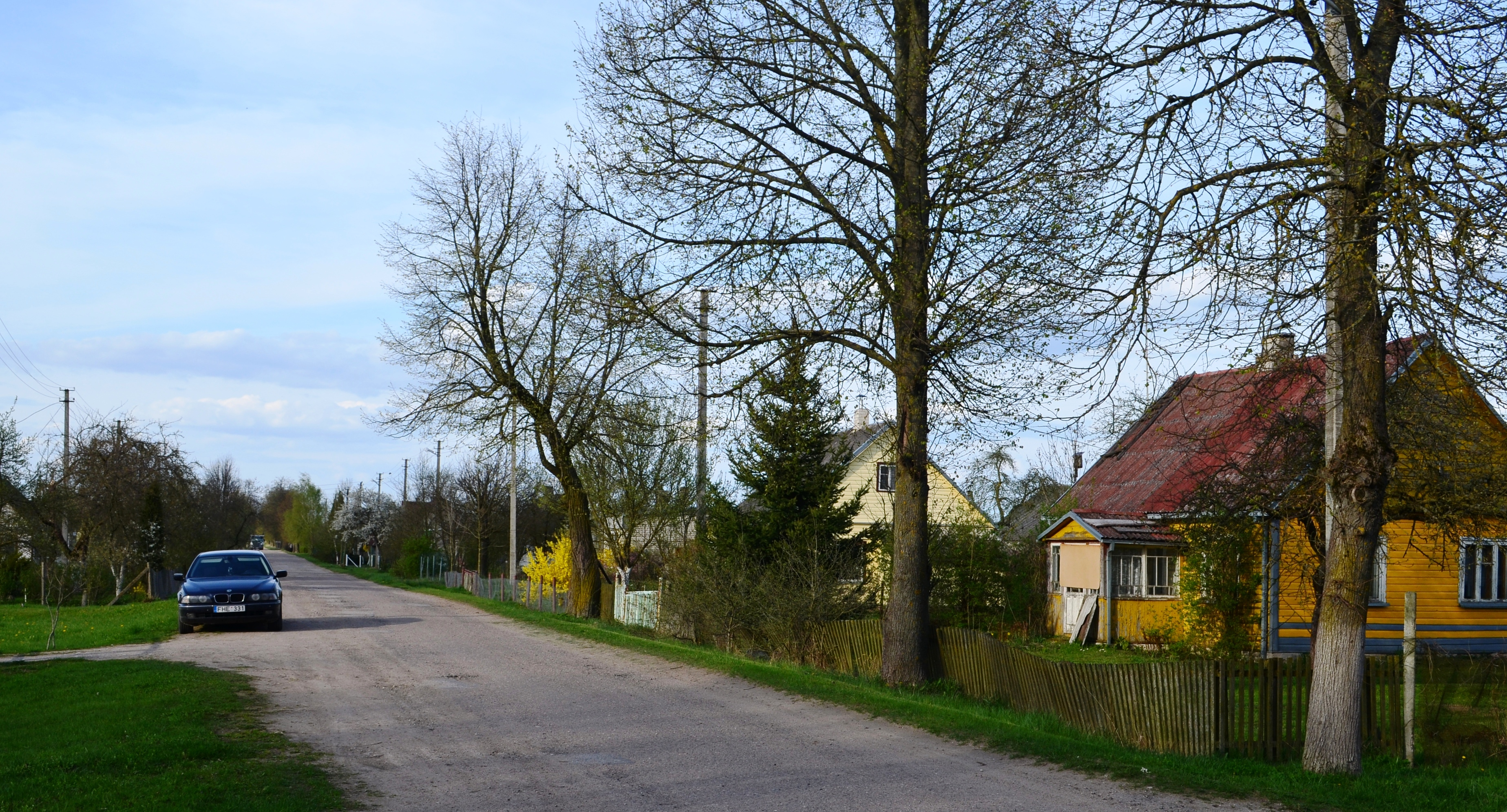

- Location in Lithuania Stasinė (Lithuania)
- Coordinates: 55°19′30″N 24°08′10″E
- Country: Lithuania
- County: Kaunas County
- Municipality: Kėdainiai district municipality
- Eldership: Vilainiai Eldership

Population (2011)
  - Total: 100
- Time zone: UTC+2 (EET)
  - Summer (DST): UTC+3 (EEST)

Stasinė (formerly Russian: Стасине) is a village in Kėdainiai district municipality, in Kaunas County, in central Lithuania. According to the 2011 census, the village had a population of 100 people. It is located 2 kilometres (1.2 mi) from Lančiūnava by the A8 highway. There is a former manor with the remaining 19th century barn, ice house and forge.

The name of the village comes from Stanislaw Kognowicki who was a landlord in Lačiūnava.

== Demography ==
Historical population

Year	Pop.	±% p.a.
1902	87	—
1923	195	+3.92%
1959	148	−0.76%
1970	108	−2.82%

Year	Pop.	±% p.a.
1979	135	+2.51%
1989	104	−2.58%
2001	115	+0.84%
2011	100	−1.39%

Source: 1902, 1923, 1959 & 1970, 1979, 1989, 2001, 2011
