= Dvarčininkai, Kėdainiai =

Dvarčininkai
- Village
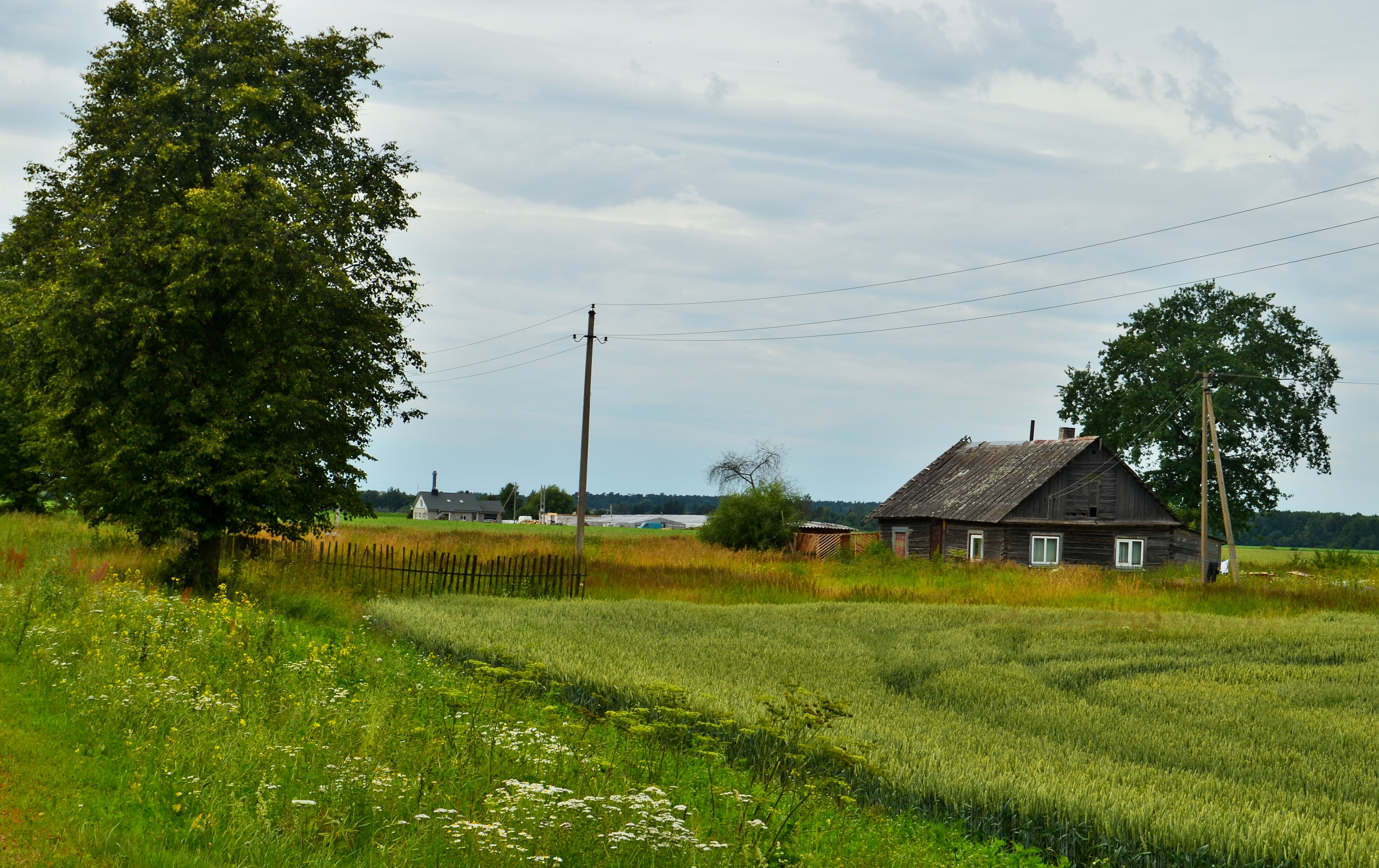

- Location in Lithuania Dvarčininkai (Lithuania)
- Coordinates: 55°17′31″N 24°02′49″E
- Country: Lithuania
- County: Kaunas County
- Municipality: Kėdainiai district municipality
- Eldership: Vilainiai Eldership

Population (2011)
  - Total: 5
- Time zone: UTC+2 (EET)
  - Summer (DST): UTC+3 (EEST)

Dvarčininkai (formerly Russian: Дворчаники, Polish: Dworczyniki) is a village in Kėdainiai district municipality, in Kaunas County, in central Lithuania. It is located 3 kilometres (1.9 mi) from Aristava, by the KK229 road, next to the Juodkiškiai Reservoir. According to the 2011 census, the village had a population of 5 people.

There is a former cemetery site (a cultural heritage object).

== Demography ==
Historical population

Year	Pop.	±% p.a.
1902	54	—
1923	72	+1.38%
1959	77	+0.19%
1970	77	+0.00%

Year	Pop.	±% p.a.
1979	34	−8.68%
1989	4	−19.27%
2001	3	−2.37%
2011	5	+5.24%

Source: 1902, 1923, 1959 & 1970, 1979, 1989, 2001, 2011
