= Melagiai =

- Village
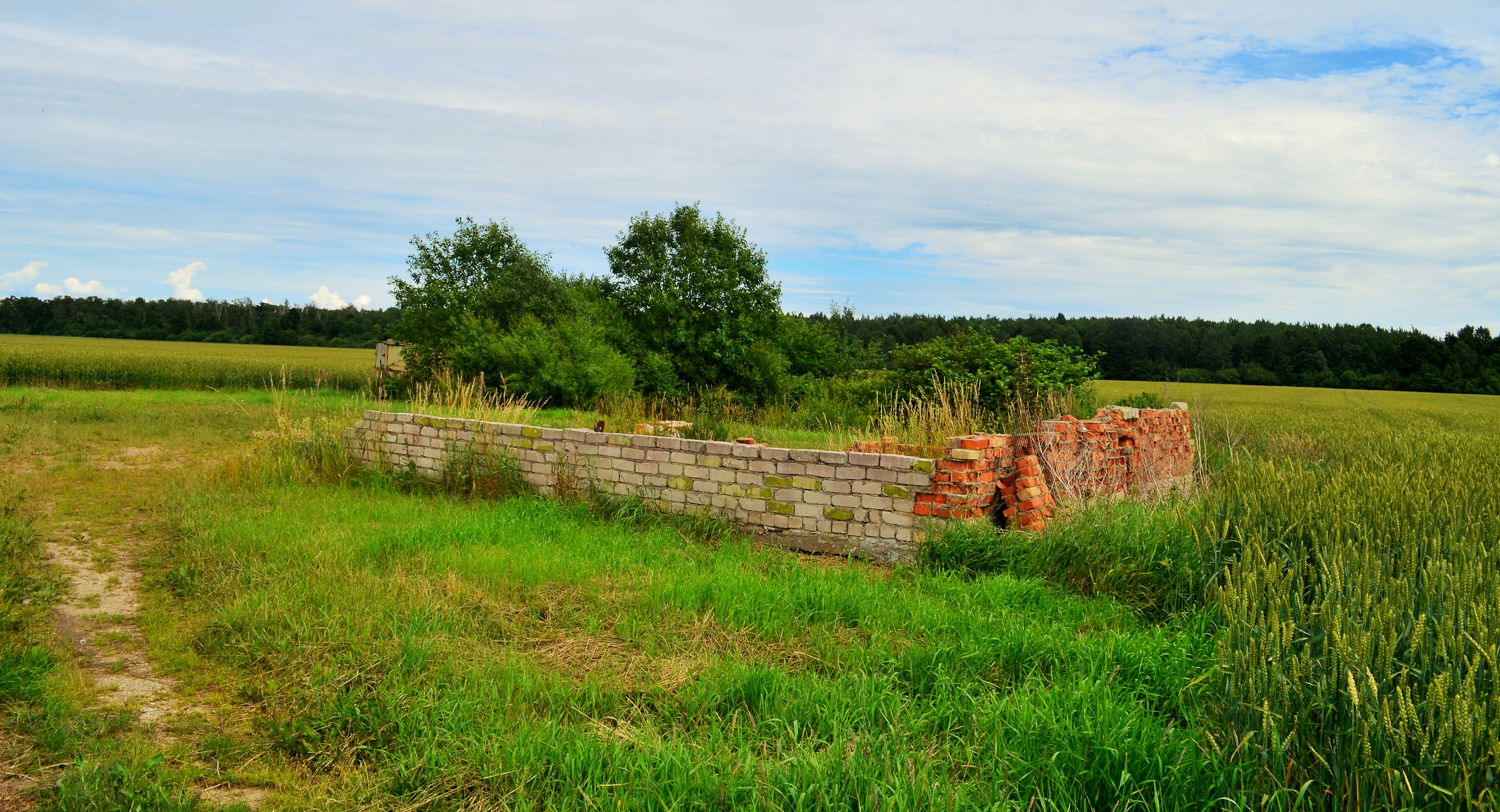

- Location in Lithuania Melagiai (Lithuania)
- Coordinates: 55°17′38″N 24°06′29″E
- Country: Lithuania
- County: Kaunas County
- Municipality: Kėdainiai district municipality
- Eldership: Vilainiai Eldership

Population (2011)
  - Total: 0
- Time zone: UTC+2 (EET)
  - Summer (DST): UTC+3 (EEST)

Melagiai ('liars', formerly Russian: Мелаги, Polish: Mełagi) is a village in Kėdainiai district municipality, in Kaunas County, in central Lithuania. According to the 2011 census, the village was uninhabited. It is located 0.5 kilometres (0.31 mi) from Aristava, by the Malčius 2nd river and a road to Ukmergė.

== Demography ==
Historical population

Year	Pop.	±% p.a.
1902	76	—
1923	71	−0.32%
1959	62	−0.38%
1970	40	−3.91%

Year	Pop.	±% p.a.
1979	5	−20.63%
1989	2	−8.76%
2001	3	+3.44%
2011	0	−100.00%

Source: 1902, 1923, 1959 & 1970, 1979, 1989, 2001, 2011
