= Bučioniai =

- Village
- Location in Lithuania Bučioniai (Lithuania)
- Coordinates: 55°26′16″N 24°04′26″E
- Country: Lithuania
- County: Kaunas County
- Municipality: Kėdainiai district municipality
- Eldership: Vilainiai Eldership

Population (2011)
  - Total: 0
- Time zone: UTC+2 (EET)
  - Summer (DST): UTC+3 (EEST)

Bučioniai (formerly Russian: Бучаны, Polish: Buczany) is a village in Kėdainiai district municipality, in Kaunas County, in central Lithuania. According to the 2011 census, the village was uninhabited. It is located 3 kilometres (1.9 mi) from Šventybrastis, nearby the Brasta rivulet.

== Demography ==
Historical population

Year	Pop.	±% p.a.
1902	132	—
1923	108	−0.95%
1959	83	−0.73%
1970	61	−2.76%
1979	9	−19.15%

Year	Pop.	±% p.a.
1984	1	−35.56%
1989	0	−100.00%
2001	0	0.00%
2011	0	0.00%

Source: 1902, 1923, 1959 & 1970, 1979, 1989, 2001, 2011

== Notable people ==
- Kazys Blaževičius (1926–2015), a Lithuanian engineer
