= Kūjėnai =

- Village
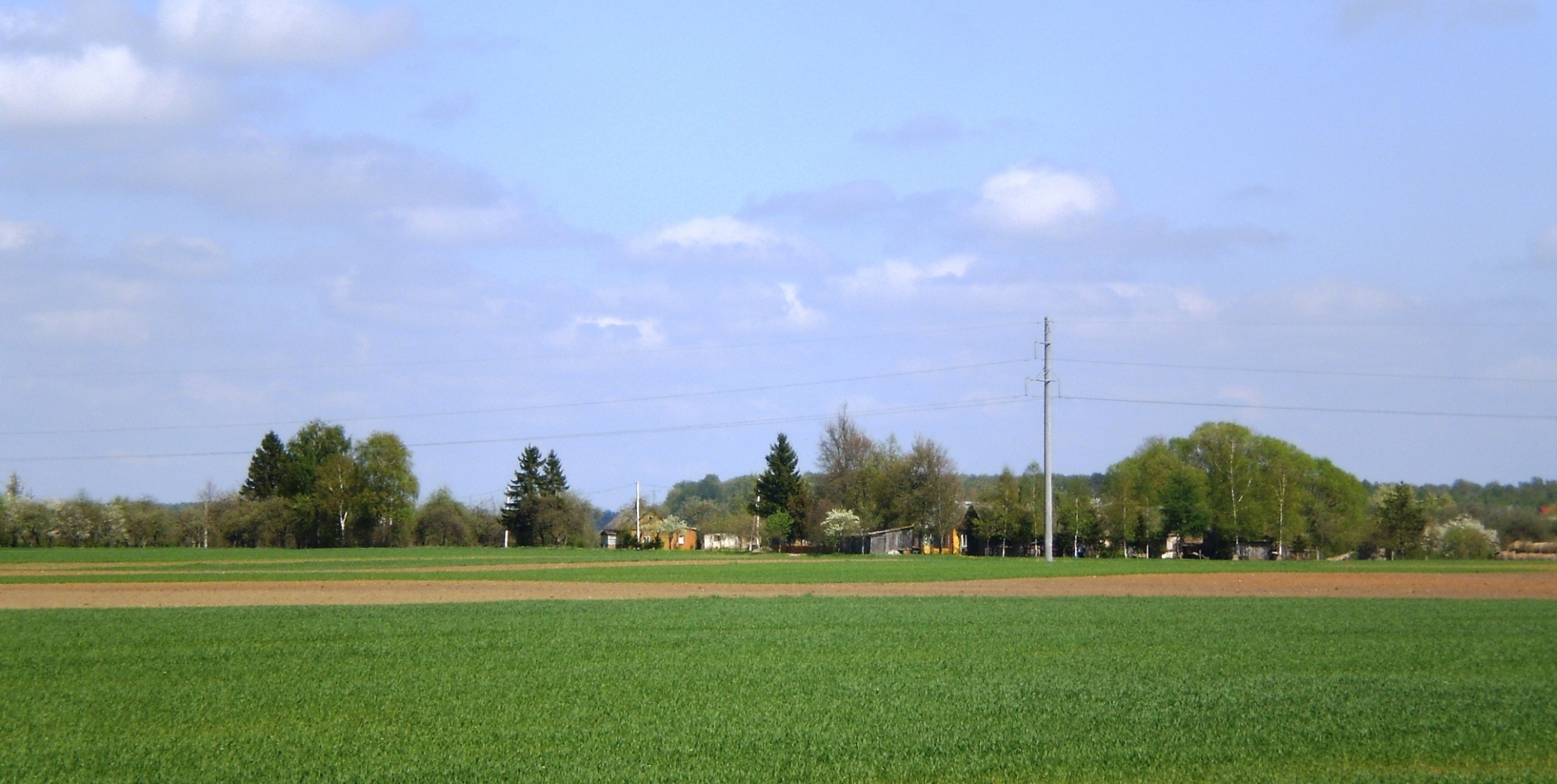

- Location in Lithuania Kūjėnai (Lithuania)
- Coordinates: 55°25′41″N 24°04′08″E
- Country: Lithuania
- County: Kaunas County
- Municipality: Kėdainiai district municipality
- Eldership: Vilainiai Eldership

Population (2011)
  - Total: 17
- Time zone: UTC+2 (EET)
  - Summer (DST): UTC+3 (EEST)

Kūjėnai (formerly Russian: Куяны, Polish: Kujany) is a village in Kėdainiai district municipality, in Kaunas County, in central Lithuania. According to the 2011 census, the village had a population of 17 people. It is located 2 kilometres (1.2 mi) from Šventybrastis, nearby the Lančiūnava-Šventybrastis Forest.

== History ==
Kūjėnai has been mentioned the first time by Hermann von Wartberge in 1372, when the village was raided by the Teutonic Order.

Kūjėnai was a folwark of the Zabielos family, and of the Černiauskai family later in the 19th century.

== Demography ==
Historical population

Year	Pop.	±% p.a.
1902	214	—
1923	258	+0.89%
1959	151	−1.48%
1970	90	−4.60%

Year	Pop.	±% p.a.
1979	55	−5.32%
1989	23	−8.35%
2001	15	−3.50%
2011	17	+1.26%

Source: 1902, 1923, 1959 & 1970, 1979, 1989, 2001, 2011
