= Skerdikai =

- Village
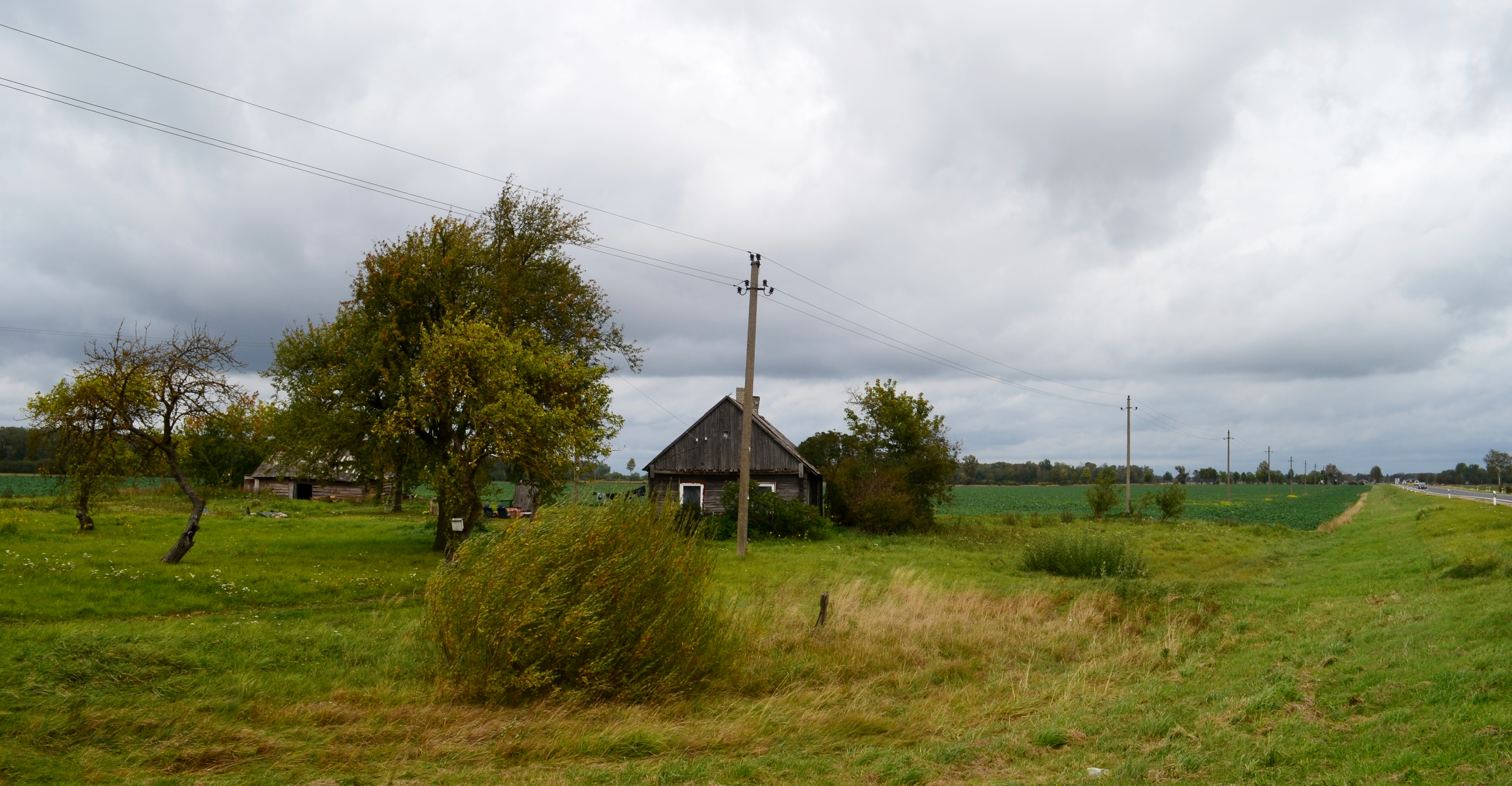

- Location in Lithuania Skerdikai (Lithuania)
- Coordinates: 55°19′19″N 24°07′08″E
- Country: Lithuania
- County: Kaunas County
- Municipality: Kėdainiai district municipality
- Eldership: Vilainiai Eldership

Population (2011)
  - Total: 0
- Time zone: UTC+2 (EET)
  - Summer (DST): UTC+3 (EEST)

Skerdikai ('butchers', formerly Russian: Скердыки) is a village in Kėdainiai district municipality, in Kaunas County, in central Lithuania. According to the 2011 census, the village was uninhabited. It is located 3 kilometres (1.9 mi) from Aristava, by the A8 highway.

== Demography ==
Historical population

| Year | Pop. | ±% p.a. |
|---|---|---|
| 1902 | 24 | — |
| 1923 | 65 | +4.86% |
| 1959 | 52 | −0.62% |
| 1970 | 26 | −6.11% |

| Year | Pop. | ±% p.a. |
|---|---|---|
| 1979 | 4 | −18.78% |
| 1989 | 4 | +0.00% |
| 2001 | 2 | −5.61% |
| 2011 | 0 | −100.00% |

Source: 1902, 1923, 1959 & 1970, 1979, 1989, 2001, 2011
