= Zavišinė =

- Village
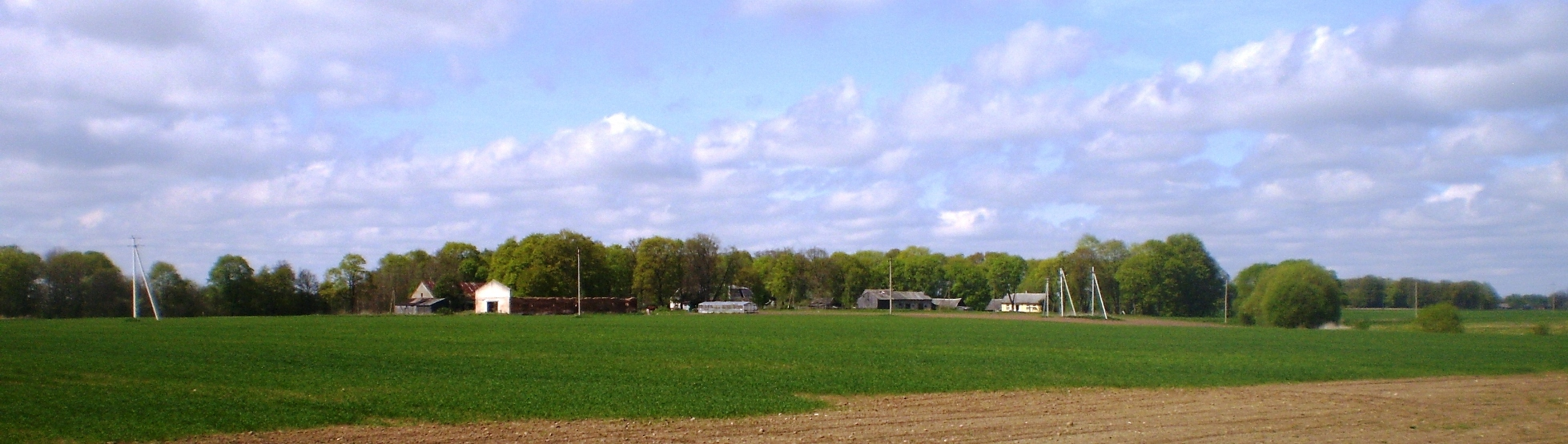

- Location in Lithuania Zavišinė (Lithuania)
- Coordinates: 55°26′10″N 24°03′22″E
- Country: Lithuania
- County: Kaunas County
- Municipality: Kėdainiai district municipality
- Eldership: Vilainiai Eldership

Population (2011)
  - Total: 8
- Time zone: UTC+2 (EET)
  - Summer (DST): UTC+3 (EEST)

Zavišinė (formerly Russian: Завишино, Polish: Zawiszyn) is a village in Kėdainiai district municipality, in Kaunas County, in central Lithuania. According to the 2011 census, the village had a population of 8 people. It is located 2 kilometres (1.2 mi) from Šventybrastis, on the bank of the Nevėžis river. There is a former manor park.

Zavišinė formerly was a manor of the Zavišos family. Later it was transferred to the Jankauskai family, there was a distillery.

== Demography ==
Historical population

Year	Pop.	±% p.a.
1859	27	—
1902	25	−0.18%
1923	87	+6.12%
1959	65	−0.81%
1970	22	−9.38%

Year	Pop.	±% p.a.
1979	20	−1.05%
1989	10	−6.70%
2001	5	−5.61%
2011	8	+4.81%

Source: 1902, 1923, 1959 & 1970, 1979, 1989, 2001, 2011
