= Užlukiai =

- Village
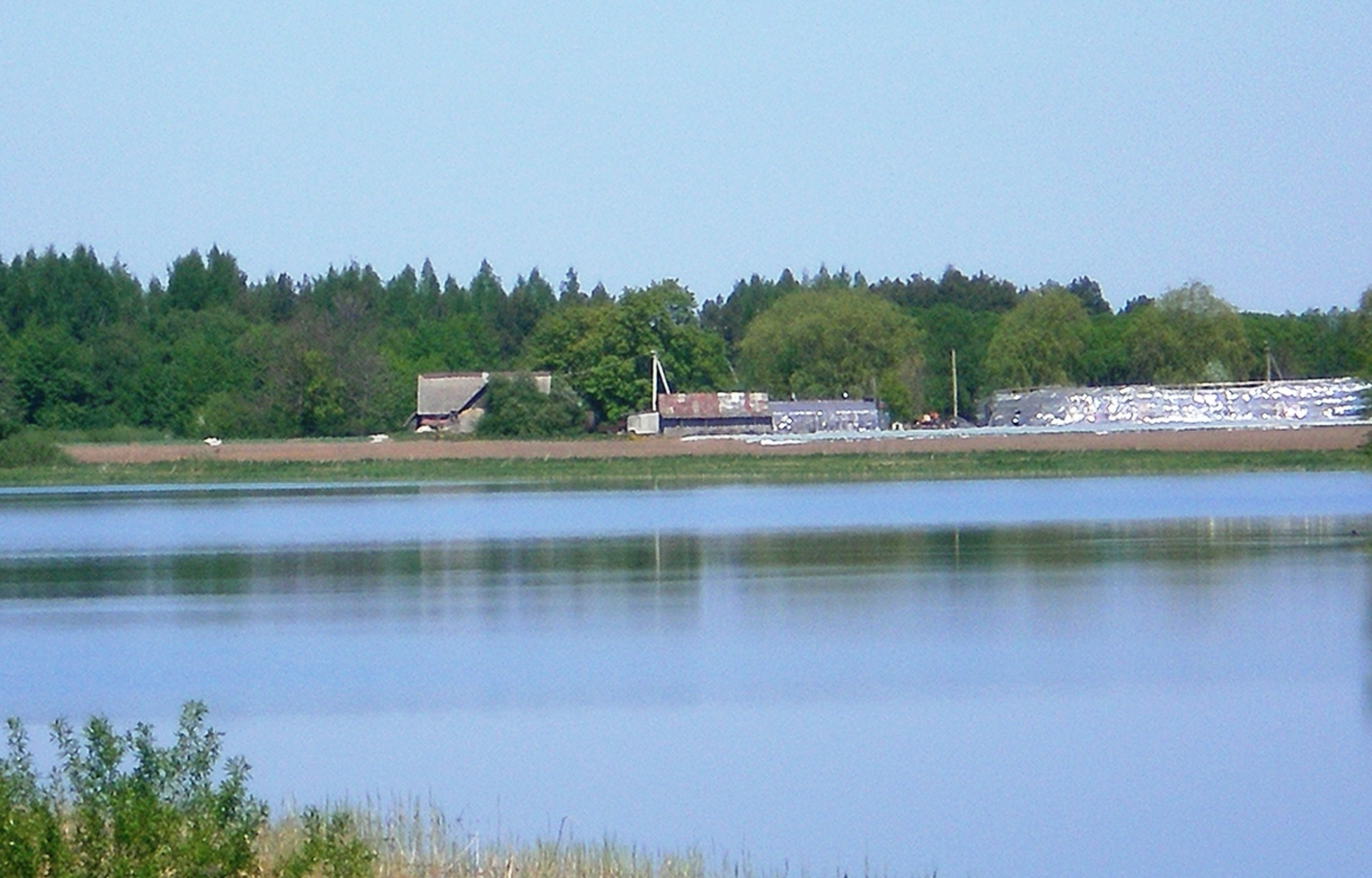

- Location in Lithuania Užlukiai (Lithuania)
- Coordinates: 55°16′59″N 24°04′30″E
- Country: Lithuania
- County: Kaunas County
- Municipality: Kėdainiai district municipality
- Eldership: Vilainiai Eldership

Population (2011)
  - Total: 2
- Time zone: UTC+2 (EET)
  - Summer (DST): UTC+3 (EEST)

Užlukiai (formerly Russian: Ужлуки) is a village in Kėdainiai district municipality, in Kaunas County, in central Lithuania. According to the 2011 census, the village had a population of 2 people. It is located 1 kilometre (0.62 mi) from Aristava, on the shore of the Bubliai Reservoir.

== Demography ==
Historical population

Year	Pop.	±% p.a.
1902	31	—
1923	45	+1.79%
1959	28	−1.31%
1970	21	−2.58%

Year	Pop.	±% p.a.
1979	15	−3.67%
1989	6	−8.76%
2001	2	−8.75%
2011	2	+0.00%

Source: 1902, 1923, 1959 & 1970, 1979, 1989, 2001, 2011
