= Vasariškiai =

- Village
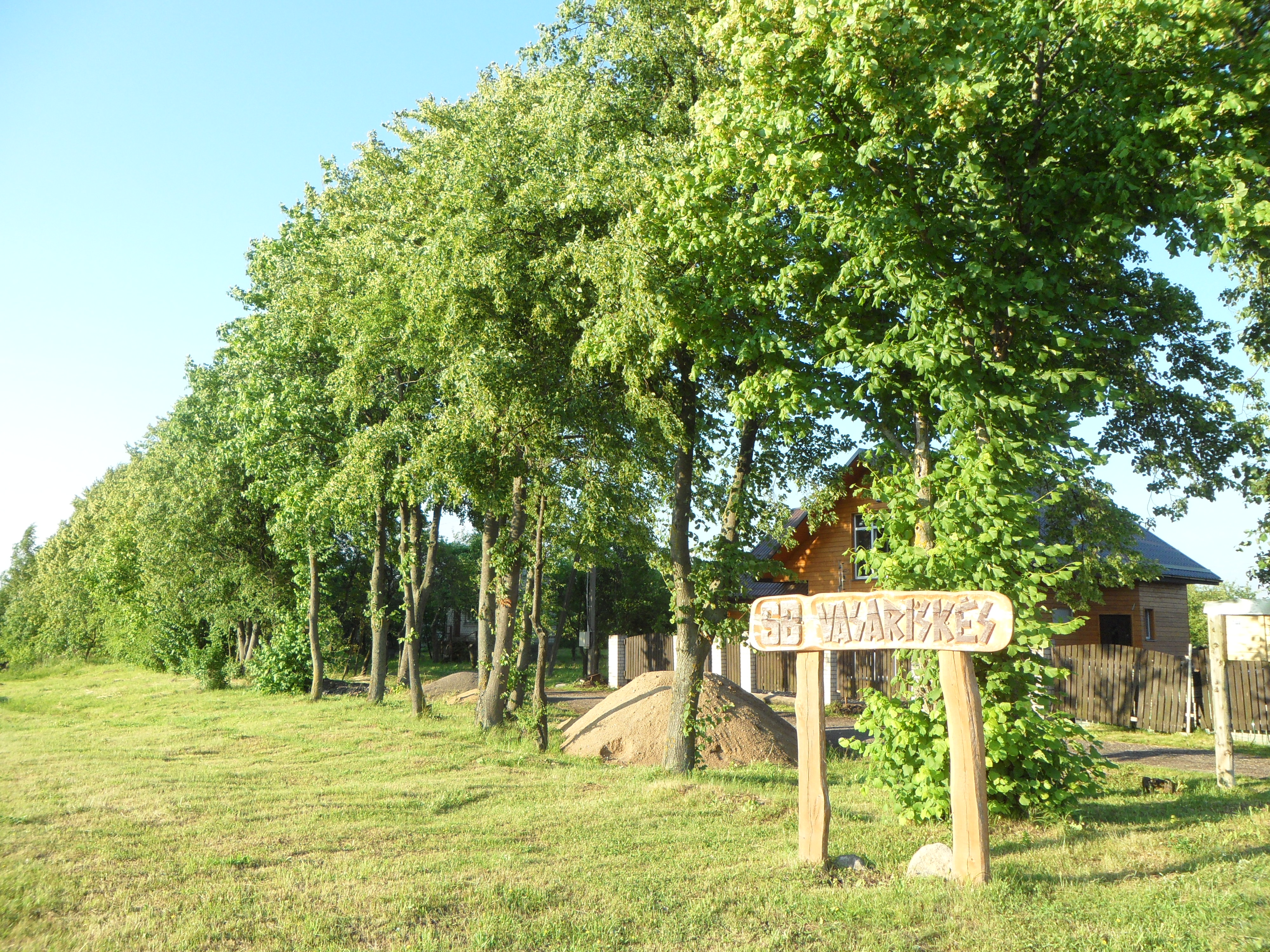

- Location in Lithuania Vasariškiai (Lithuania)
- Coordinates: 55°19′10″N 24°00′50″E
- Country: Lithuania
- County: Kaunas County
- Municipality: Kėdainiai district municipality
- Eldership: Vilainiai Eldership

Population (2011)
  - Total: 46
- Time zone: UTC+2 (EET)
  - Summer (DST): UTC+3 (EEST)

Vasariškiai is a village in Kėdainiai district municipality, in Kaunas County, in central Lithuania. According to the 2011 census, the village had a population of 46 people. It is located 0.5 kilometres (0.31 mi) from Vilainiai, near the left bank of the Nevėžis river. It is a collective gardening area since the Soviet times.

== Demography ==
Historical population

Year	Pop.	±% p.a.
1959	108	—
1970	84	−2.26%
1979	40	−7.91%

Year	Pop.	±% p.a.
1989	20	−6.70%
2001	29	+3.14%
2011	46	+4.72%

Source: 1902, 1923, 1959 & 1970, 1979, 1989, 2001, 2011
