= Tiskūnai =

- Village
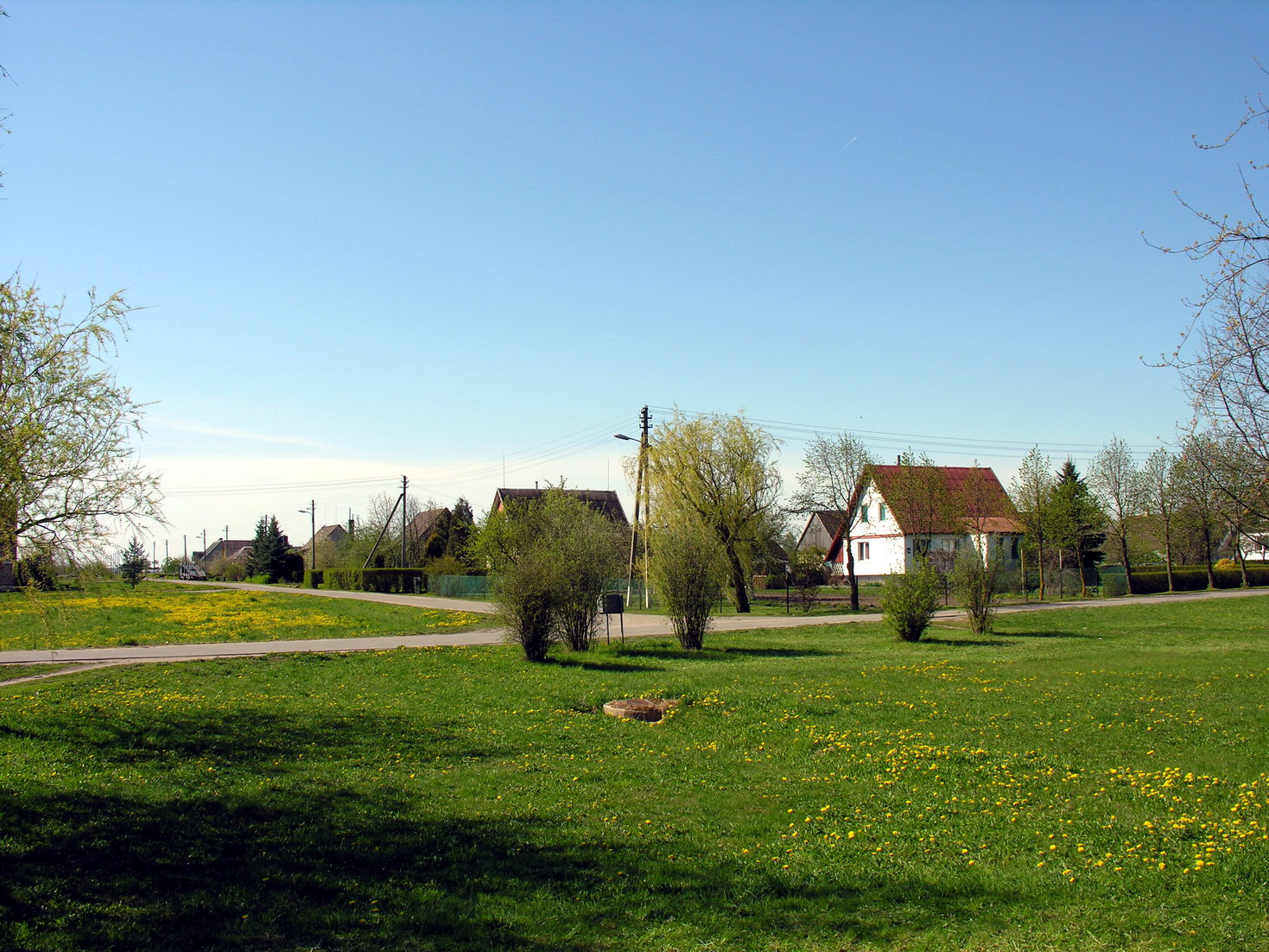

- Location in Lithuania Tiskūnai (Lithuania)
- Coordinates: 55°21′00″N 24°00′50″E
- Country: Lithuania
- County: Kaunas County
- Municipality: Kėdainiai district municipality
- Eldership: Vilainiai Eldership

Population (2011)
  - Total: 427
- Time zone: UTC+2 (EET)
  - Summer (DST): UTC+3 (EEST)

Tiskūnai (formerly Russian: Тыскуны) is a village in Kėdainiai district municipality, in Kaunas County, in central Lithuania. According to the 2011 census, the village had a population of 427 people. It is located 8 kilometres (5.0 mi) from Kėdainiai, nearby the Nevėžis river, by its tributary the Žalesys and a pond on it. There is a library, a former school, a community house, an ostrich farm.

== History ==
An ancient stone axe has been found in Tiskūnai. The village developed during the Soviet era, when it became a center of the "Rised Sod" kolkhoz.

== Demography ==
Historical population

Year	Pop.	±% p.a.
1902	95	—
1923	77	−1.00%
1959	143	+1.73%
1970	227	+4.29%
1979	346	+4.79%

Year	Pop.	±% p.a.
1987	437	+2.96%
1989	400	−4.33%
2001	481	+1.55%
2011	427	−1.18%

Source: 1902, 1923, 1959 & 1970, 1979, 1989, 2001, 2011

== Images ==
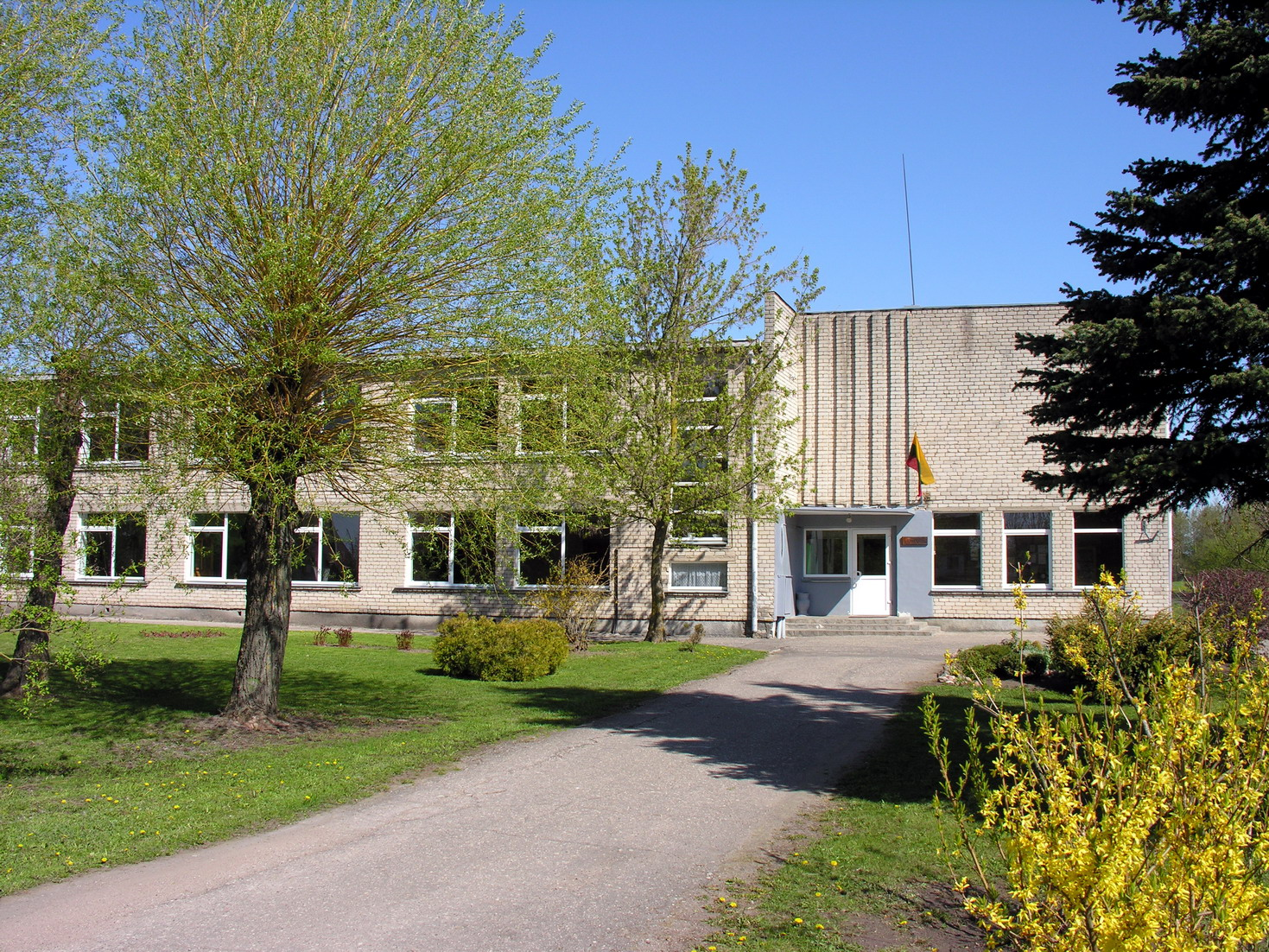
Tiskūnai school

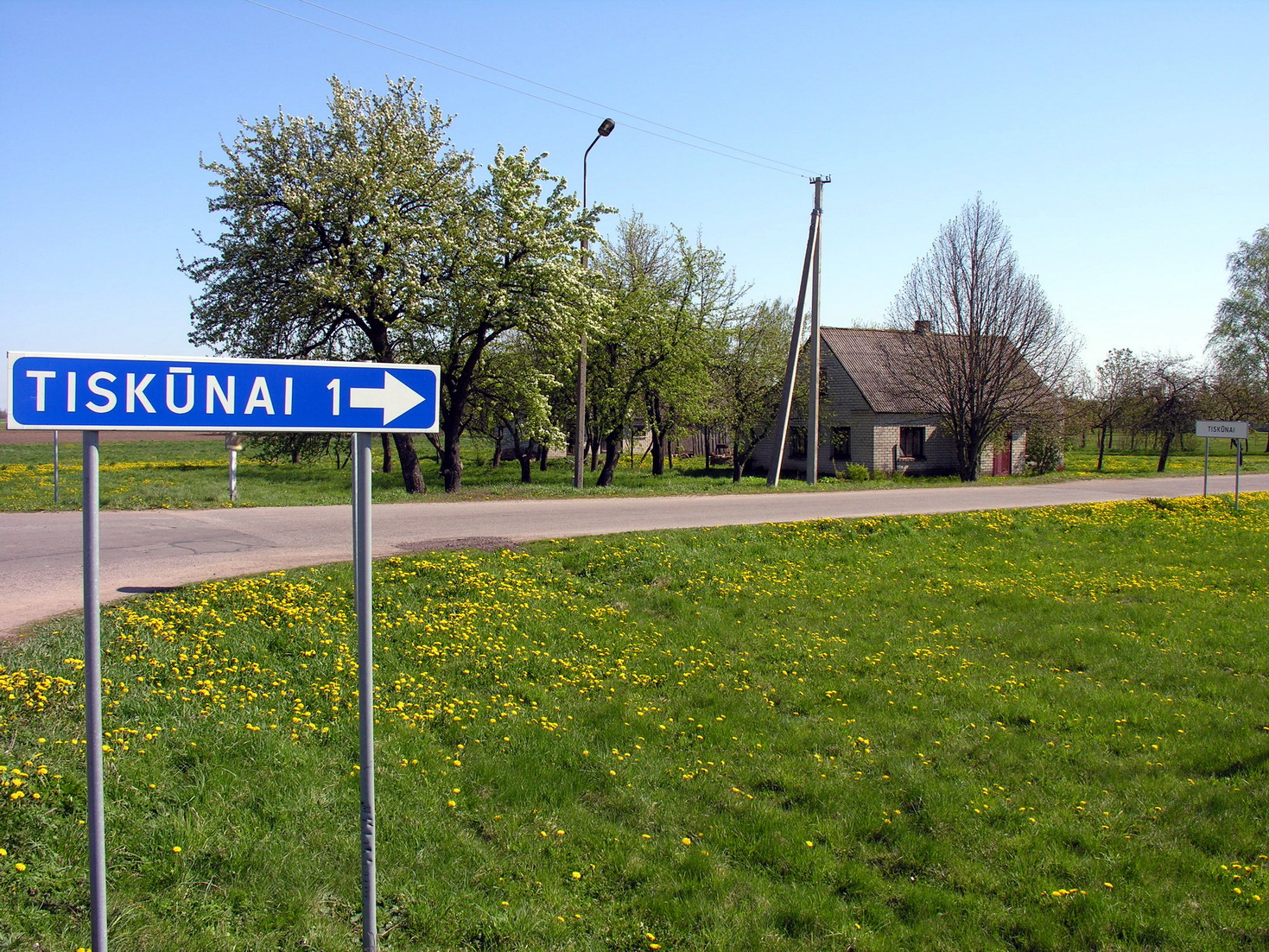
Tiskūnai entrance

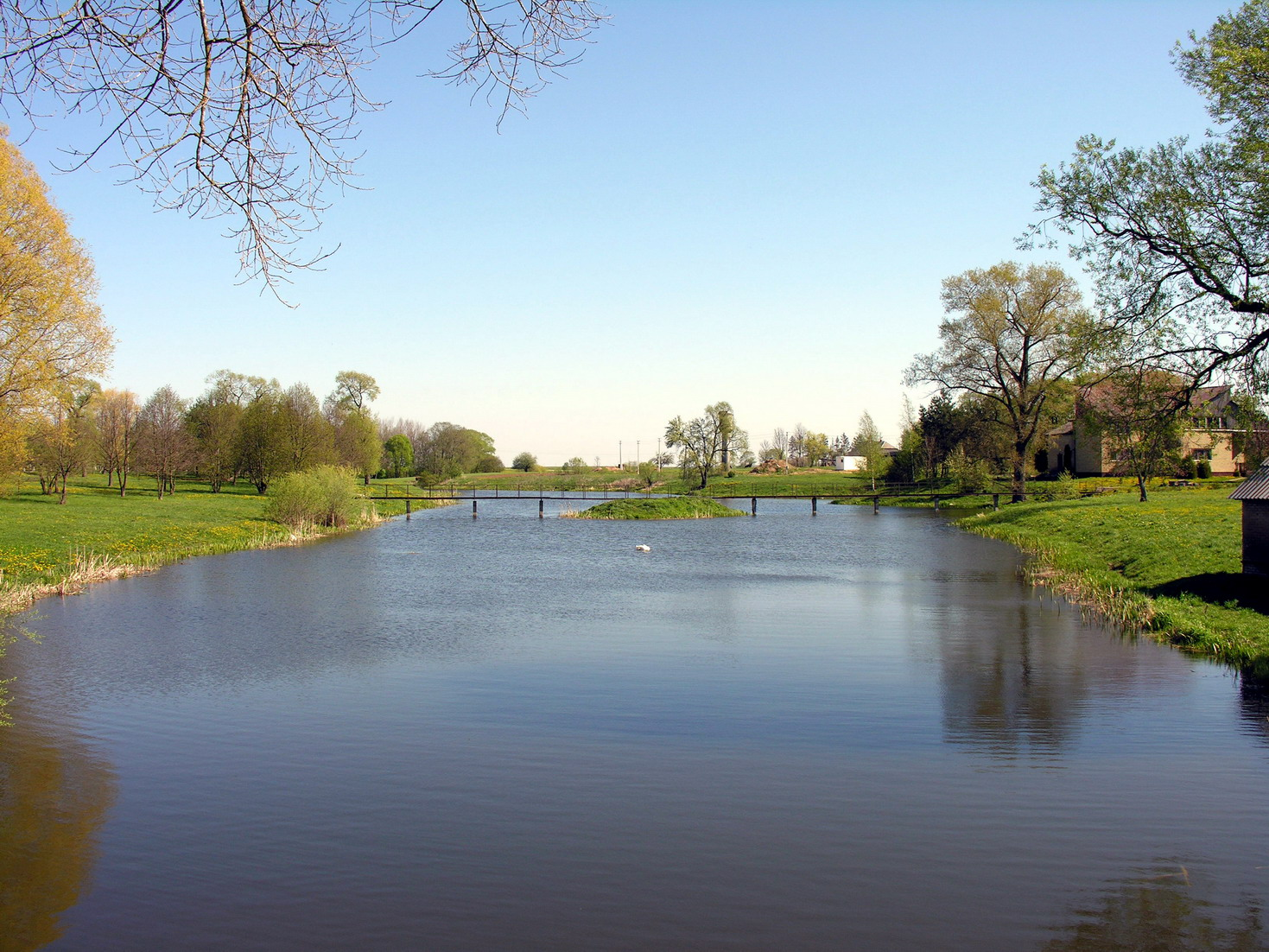
Žalesys Pond in Tiskūnai

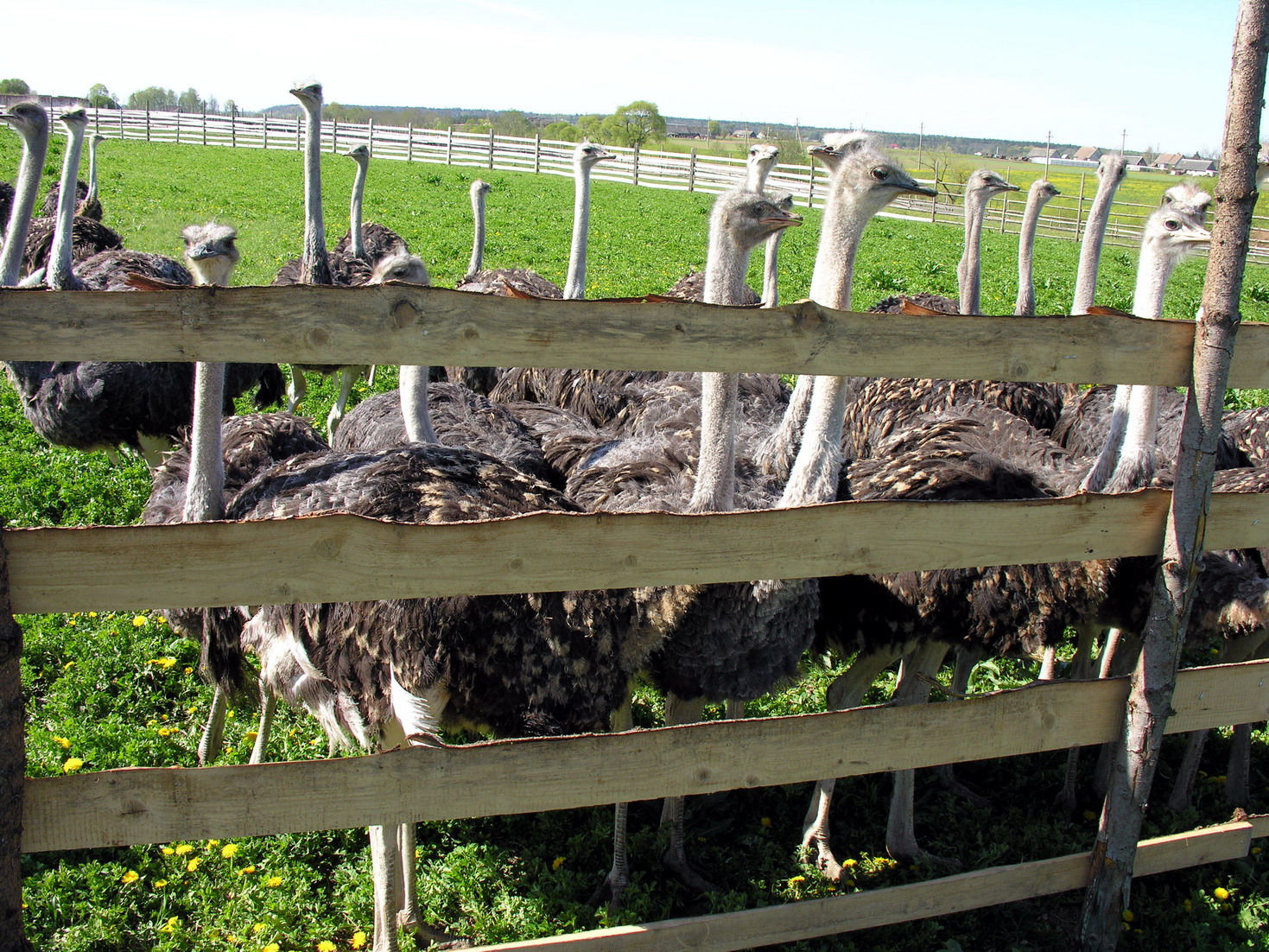
Ostrich farm
