= Alkupis (Nevėžis tributary) =

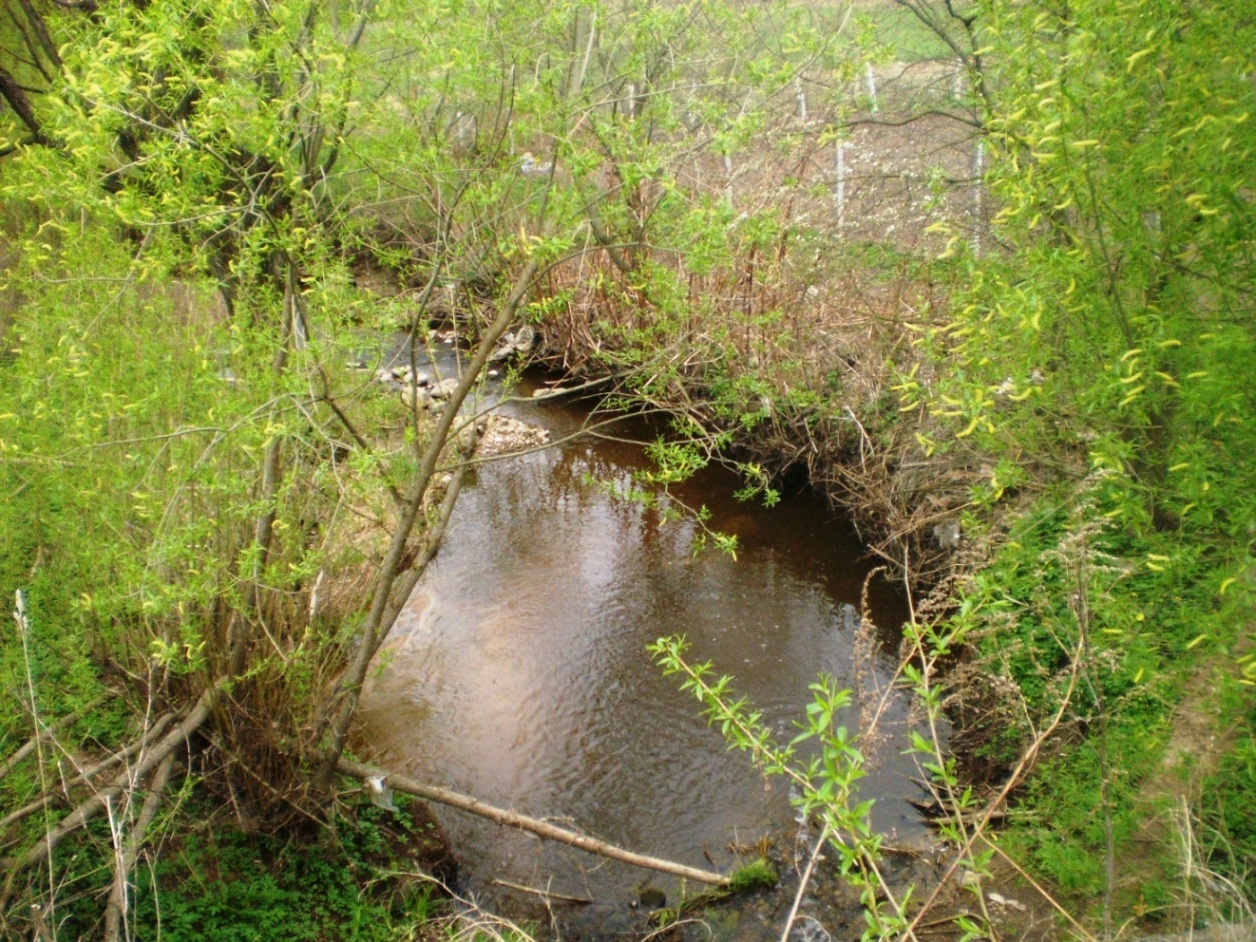
- Alkupis in Apytalaukis

Location
- Country: Lithuania
- Location: Kėdainiai district municipality, Kaunas County

Physical characteristics
- Source
  - location: Lančiūnava-Šventybrastis Forest
- Mouth: Nevėžis in Apytalaukis
  - coordinates: 55°19′33″N 24°0′28″E
- Length: 12.3 km (7.6 mi)
- Basin size: 41.8 km^{2} (16.1 sq mi)

Basin features
- Progression: Nevėžis→ Neman→ Baltic Sea
- Tributaries
  - right: Kiaulupys

The Alkupis is a river of Kėdainiai district municipality, Kaunas County in central Lithuania. It flows for 12.3 kilometres and has a basin area of 41.8 km^{2}. It starts in the Lančiūnava-Šventybrastis Forest east of Šventybrastis. The Alkupis flows southwards through forests and agriculture lands. It is a left-bank tributary of the Nevėžis, which it flows into in Apytalaukis village.

There were several villages (Peiksva, Marijanka, Melninkai) by the Alkupis once but now only Apytalaukis village is inhabited.

The hydronym Alkupis is a compound noun - the first root derives from Lithuanian alkas, alka ('sacred place, shrine' and 'boggy place') and the second root from the word upė ('river').
