= Bubliai =

- Village
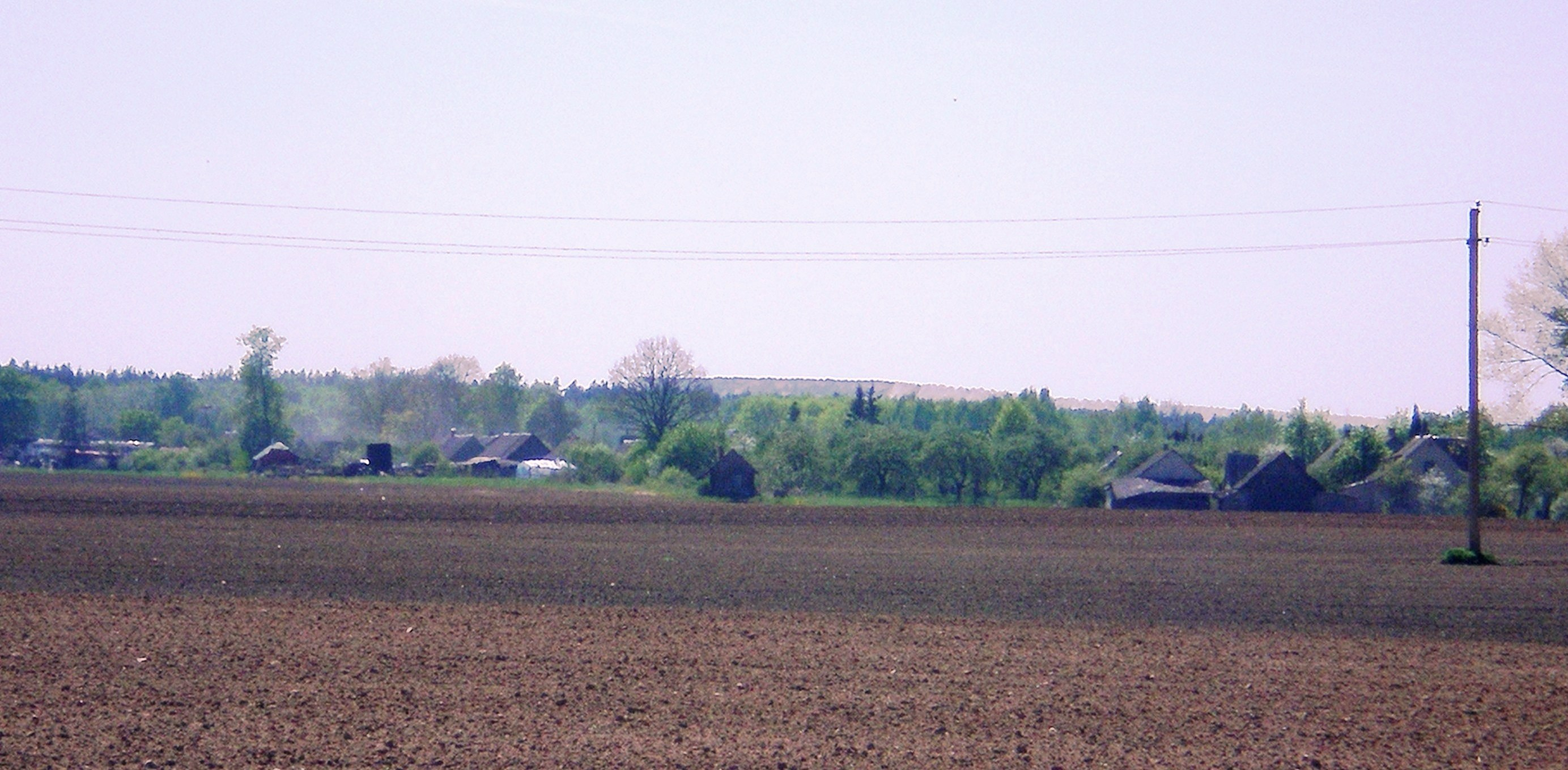

- Location in Lithuania Bubliai (Lithuania)
- Coordinates: 55°16′08″N 24°04′30″E
- Country: Lithuania
- County: Kaunas County
- Municipality: Kėdainiai district municipality
- Eldership: Vilainiai Eldership

Population (2011)
  - Total: 29
- Time zone: UTC+2 (EET)
  - Summer (DST): UTC+3 (EEST)

Bubliai (formerly Russian: Бубли, Polish: Buble) is a village in Kėdainiai district municipality, in Kaunas County, in central Lithuania. According to the 2011 census, the village had a population of 29 people. It is located 2 kilometres (1.2 mi) from Aristava, by the Bubliai Reservoir and the Piltyna river. A small hydroelectric power plant is installed near Bubliai. The A8 highway passes nearby.

At the beginning of the 20th century there was Bubliai manor and village.

== Demography ==
Historical population

Year	Pop.	±% p.a.
1902	135	—
1923	161	+0.84%
1959	118	−0.86%
1970	97	−1.77%

Year	Pop.	±% p.a.
1979	65	−4.35%
1989	40	−4.74%
2001	35	−1.11%
2011	29	−1.86%

Source: 1902, 1923, 1959 & 1970, 1979, 1989, 2001, 2011
