= Rudžiai, Kėdainiai =

Rudžiai
- Village
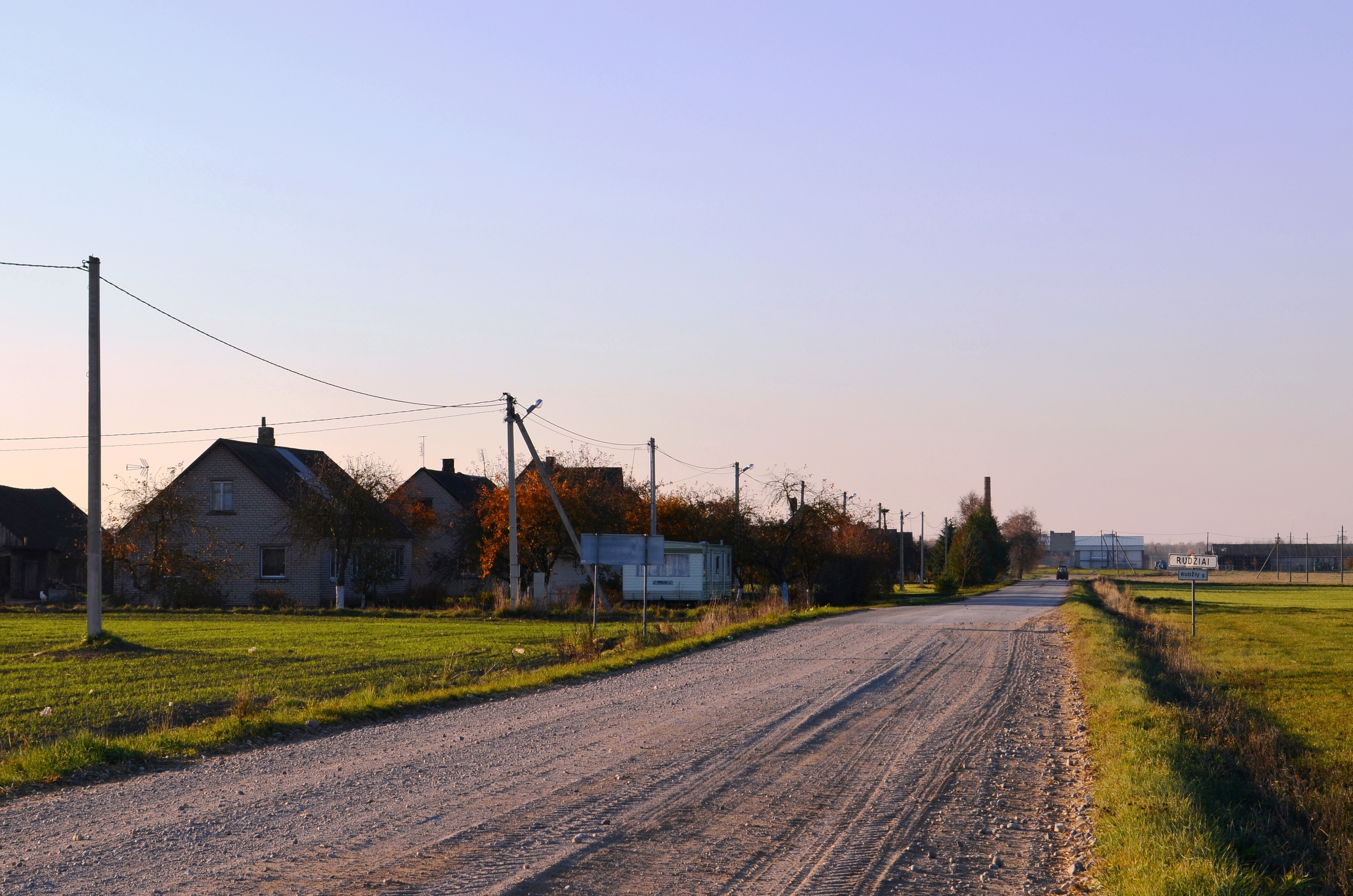

- Location in Lithuania Rudžiai (Lithuania)
- Coordinates: 55°21′29″N 24°06′40″E
- Country: Lithuania
- County: Kaunas County
- Municipality: Kėdainiai district municipality
- Eldership: Vilainiai Eldership

Population (2011)
  - Total: 61
- Time zone: UTC+2 (EET)
  - Summer (DST): UTC+3 (EEST)

Rudžiai (formerly Russian: Рудзи, Polish: Rudzie) is a village in Kėdainiai district municipality, in Kaunas County, in central Lithuania. According to the 2011 census, the village had a population of 61 people. It is located 2.5 kilometres (1.6 mi) from Lančiūnava, by the Lančiūnava-Šventybrastis Forest, nearby the Malčius river. There is a farm.

Formerly it was a property of the Babenskiai, Paulauskai and Macenisovai families.

== Demography ==
Historical population

Year	Pop.	±% p.a.
1902	128	—
1923	134	+0.22%
1959	108	−0.60%
1970	67	−4.25%

Year	Pop.	±% p.a.
1979	77	+1.56%
1989	67	−1.38%
2001	69	+0.25%
2011	61	−1.22%

Source: 1902, 1923, 1959 & 1970, 1979, 1989, 2001, 2011
