= Aristavėlė =

- Village
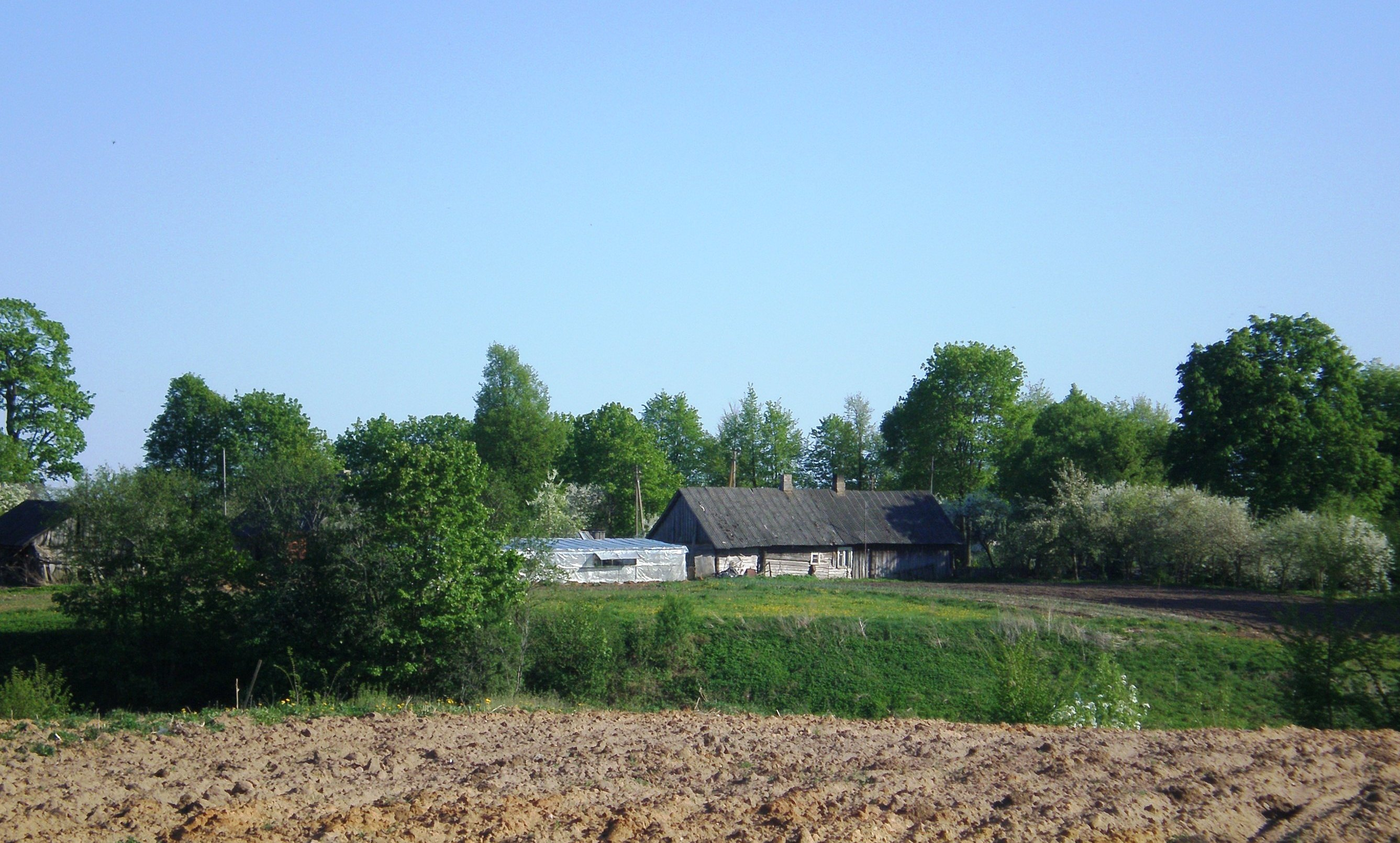

- Location in Lithuania Aristavėlė (Lithuania)
- Coordinates: 55°17′24″N 24°03′36″E
- Country: Lithuania
- County: Kaunas County
- Municipality: Kėdainiai district municipality
- Eldership: Vilainiai Eldership

Population (2011)
  - Total: 6
- Time zone: UTC+2 (EET)
  - Summer (DST): UTC+3 (EEST)

Aristavėlė (formerly Russian: Орвистово, Ариставеле, Polish: Orwistów) is a village in Kėdainiai district municipality, in Kaunas County, in central Lithuania. According to the 2011 census, the village had a population of 6 people. It is located 1 kilometre (0.62 mi) from Aristava, on the shore of the Juodkiškiai Reservoir, at the confluence of the Obelis and the Malčius river, close to the A8 and KK229 intersection.

There is a site of a former manor (the wooden palace building was moved to the Museum of the Lithuanian Folk Life in 1987) and relics of a former chapel (built in 1744).

== History ==
One of the oldest known Lithuanian manors (a property of nobleman Algimantas) was located in Aristavėlė (formerly Aristava). It belonged to the Dębski family in the 18th century and to the Gintautai in 1863. Another palace by the Malčius river was a property of the Zabielos and the Medekšos.

== Demography ==
Historical population

Year	Pop.	±% p.a.
1902	56	—
1923	23	−4.15%
1959	22	−0.12%
1970	12	−5.36%

Year	Pop.	±% p.a.
1979	13	+0.89%
1989	7	−6.00%
2001	11	+3.84%
2011	6	−5.88%

Source: 1902, 1923, 1959 & 1970, 1979, 1989, 2001, 2011

== Images ==
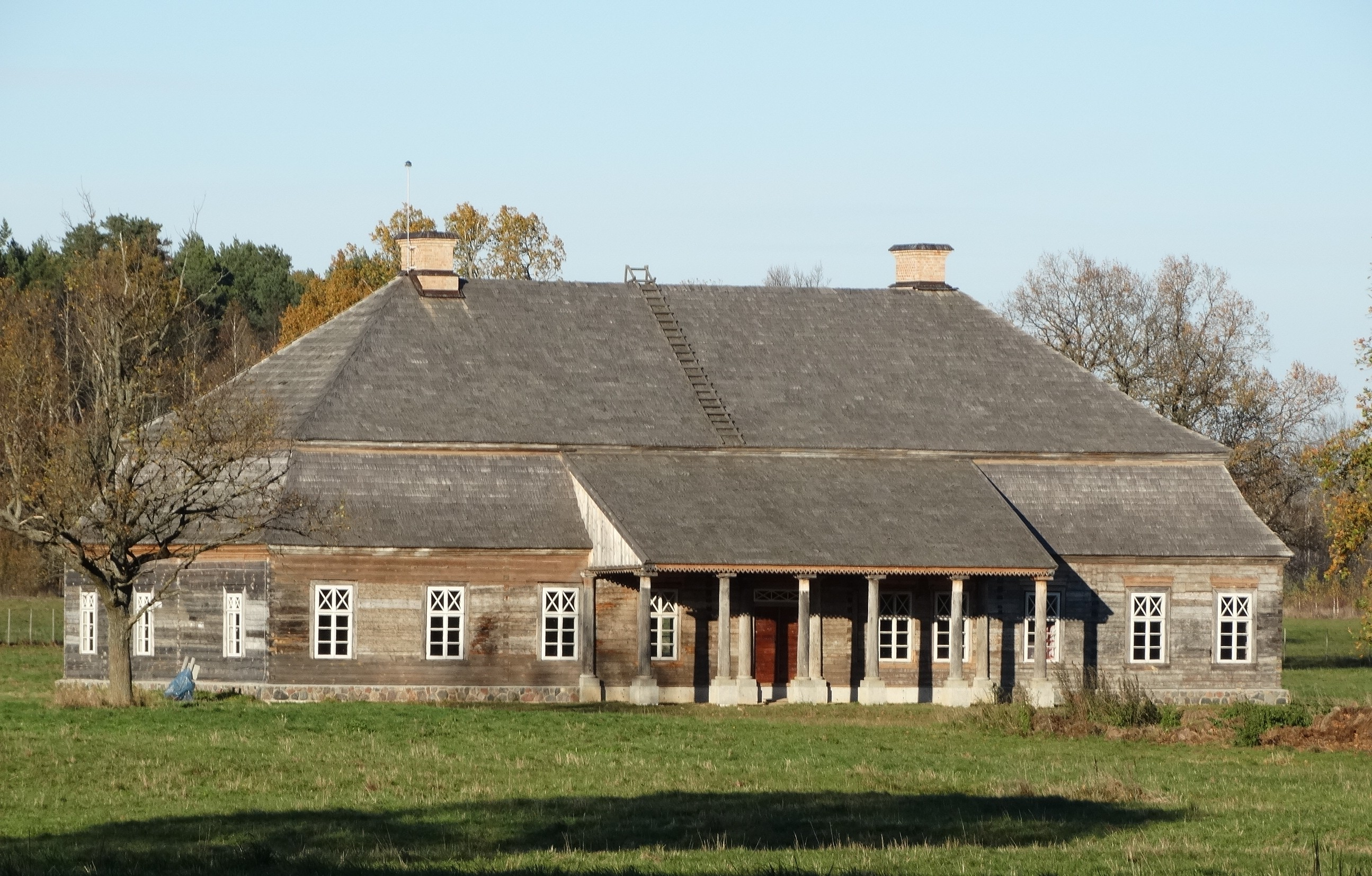
Aristavėlė manor (now in Rumšiškės)

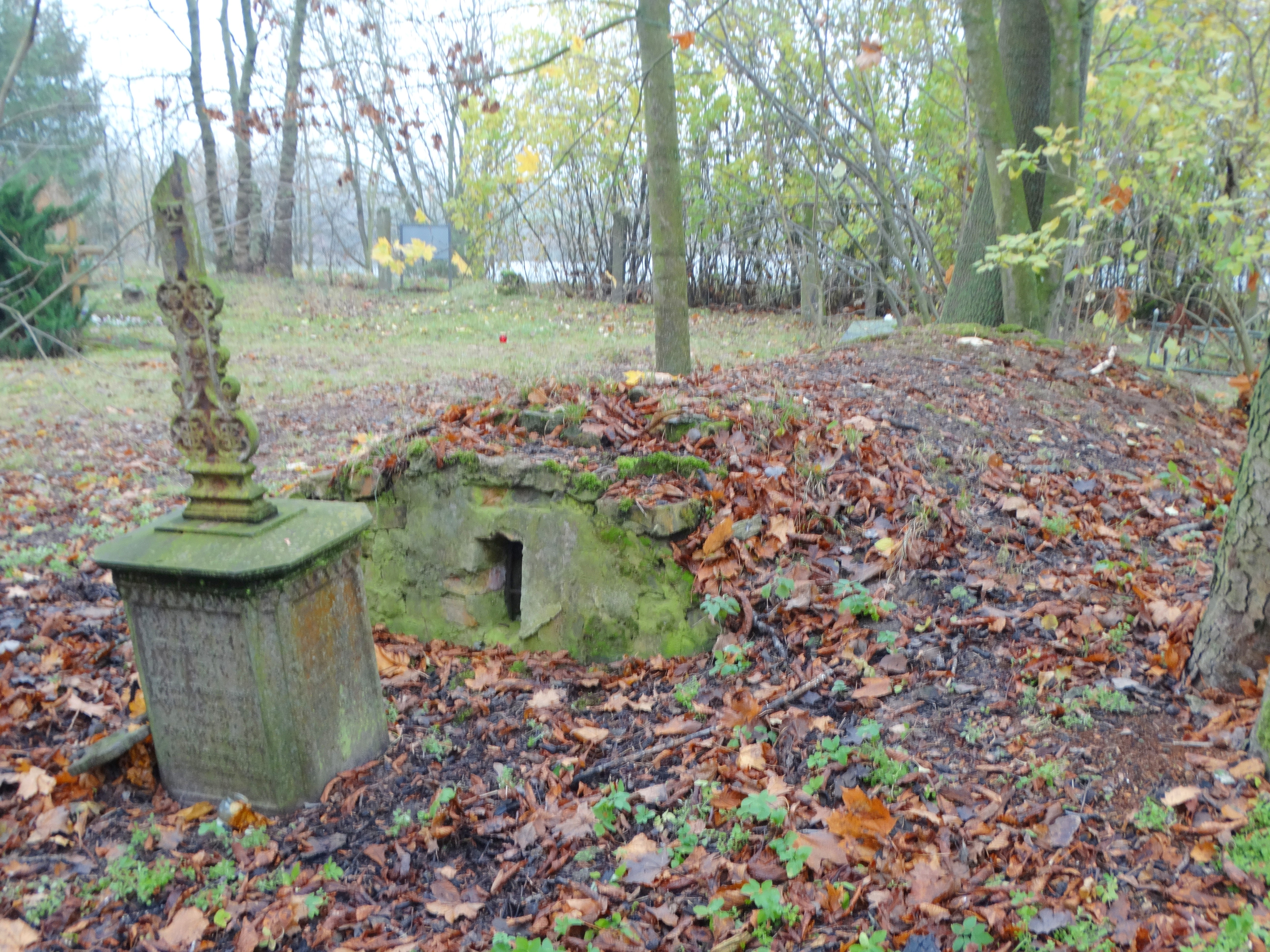
Aristavėlė chapel relics

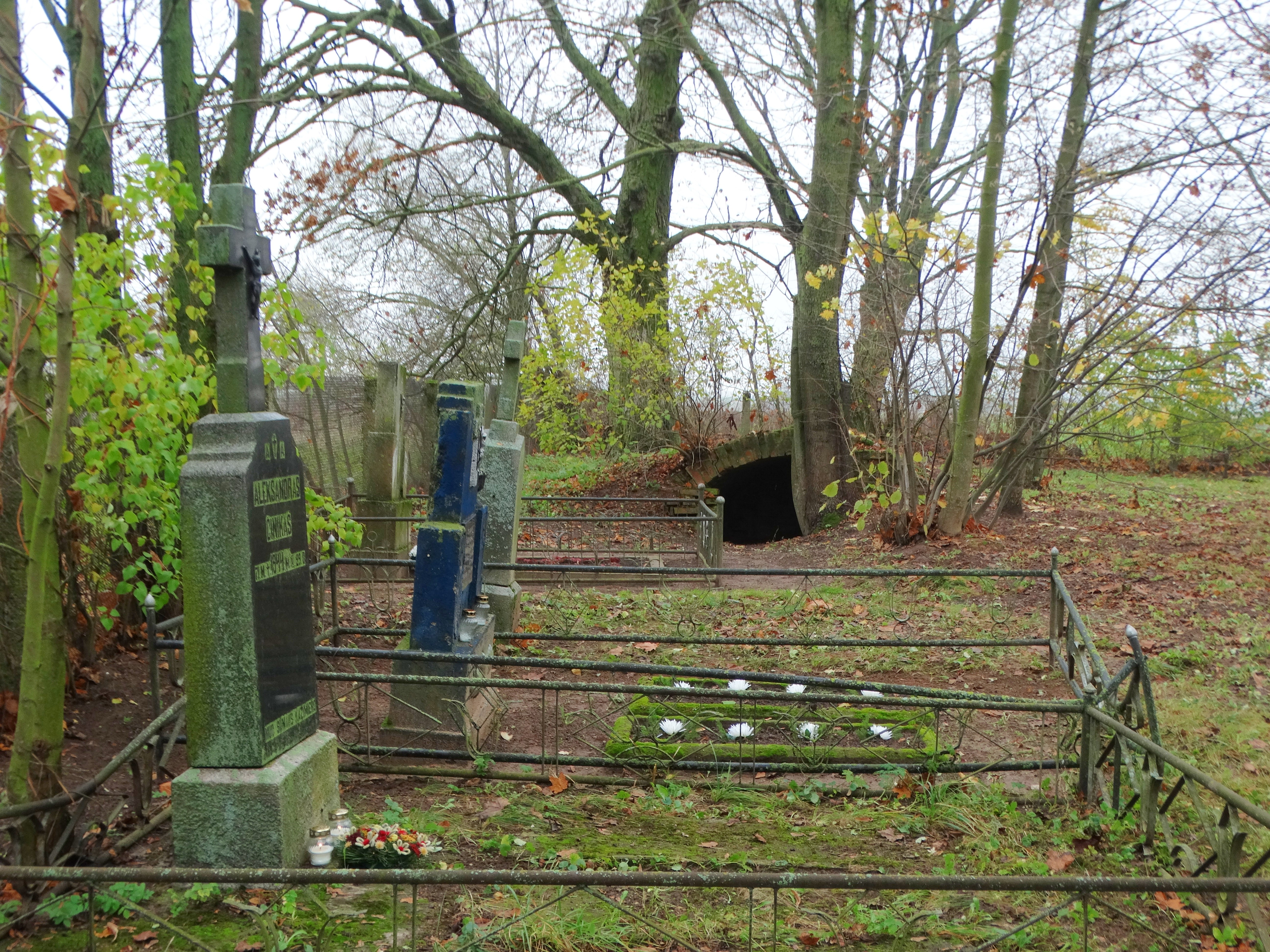
Aristavėlė graveyard
