= Būdai, Vilainiai =

Būdai
- Village
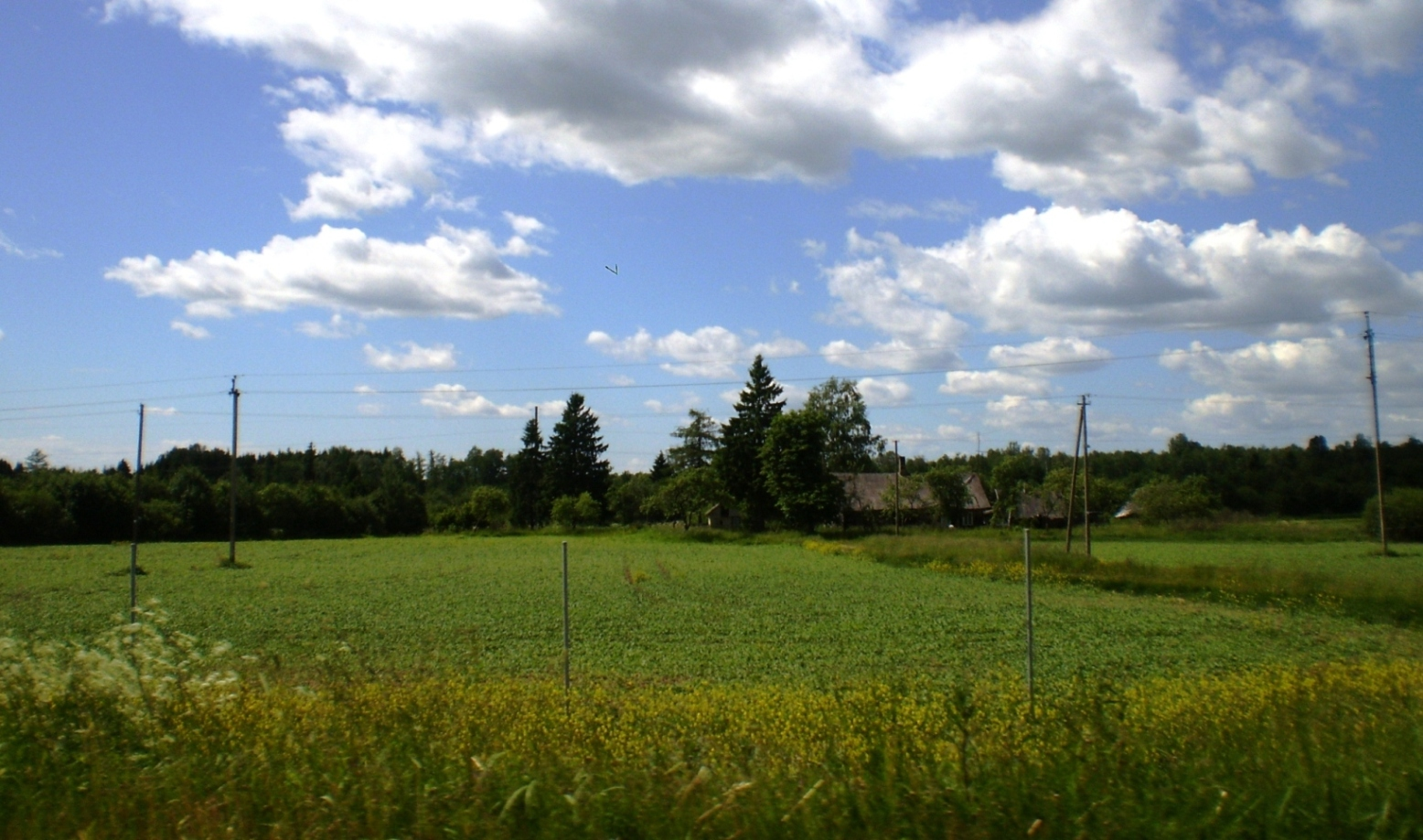

- Location in Lithuania Būdai (Lithuania)
- Coordinates: 55°22′19″N 24°10′08″E
- Country: Lithuania
- County: Kaunas County
- Municipality: Kėdainiai district municipality
- Eldership: Vilainiai Eldership

Population (2011)
  - Total: 10
- Time zone: UTC+2 (EET)
  - Summer (DST): UTC+3 (EEST)

Būdai (formerly Russian: Буды, Polish: Budy) is a village in Kėdainiai district municipality, in Kaunas County, in central Lithuania. According to the 2011 census, the village had a population of 10 people. It is located 2.5 kilometres (1.6 mi) from Lančiūnava, alongside the A8 highway, surrounded by the Lančiūnava-Šventybrastis Forest.

== Demography ==
Historical population

Year	Pop.	±% p.a.
1902	49	—
1923	81	+2.42%
1959	51	−1.28%
1970	51	+0.00%

Year	Pop.	±% p.a.
1979	23	−8.47%
1989	16	−3.56%
2001	14	−1.11%
2011	10	−3.31%

Source: 1902, 1923, 1959 & 1970, 1979, 1989, 2001, 2011
