= Daukainiai =

- Village
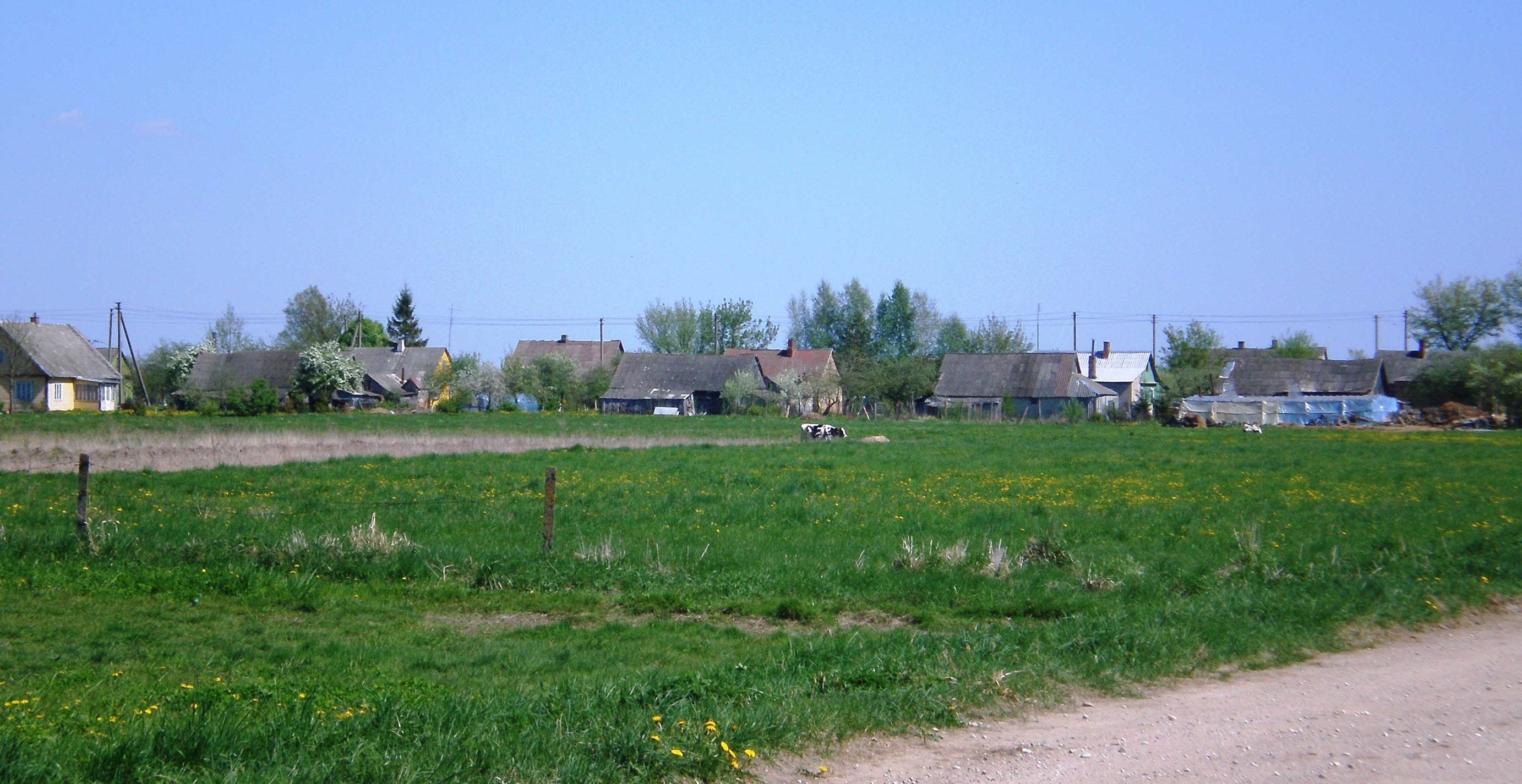

- Location in Lithuania Daukainiai (Lithuania)
- Coordinates: 55°16′52″N 24°06′29″E
- Country: Lithuania
- County: Kaunas County
- Municipality: Kėdainiai district municipality
- Eldership: Vilainiai Eldership

Population (2011)
  - Total: 40
- Time zone: UTC+2 (EET)
  - Summer (DST): UTC+3 (EEST)

Daukainiai (formerly Russian: Даукайняй) is a village in Kėdainiai district municipality, in Kaunas County, in central Lithuania. According to the 2011 census, the village had a population of 40 people. It is located 1 kilometre (0.62 mi) from Aristava, on the shore of the Bubliai Reservoir.

== Demography ==
Historical population

Year	Pop.	±% p.a.
1923	166	—
1959	107	−1.21%
1970	112	+0.42%
1979	71	−4.94%

Year	Pop.	±% p.a.
1989	37	−6.31%
2001	45	+1.64%
2011	40	−1.17%

Source: 1902, 1923, 1959 & 1970, 1979, 1989, 2001, 2011
