= Milžemiai =

- Village
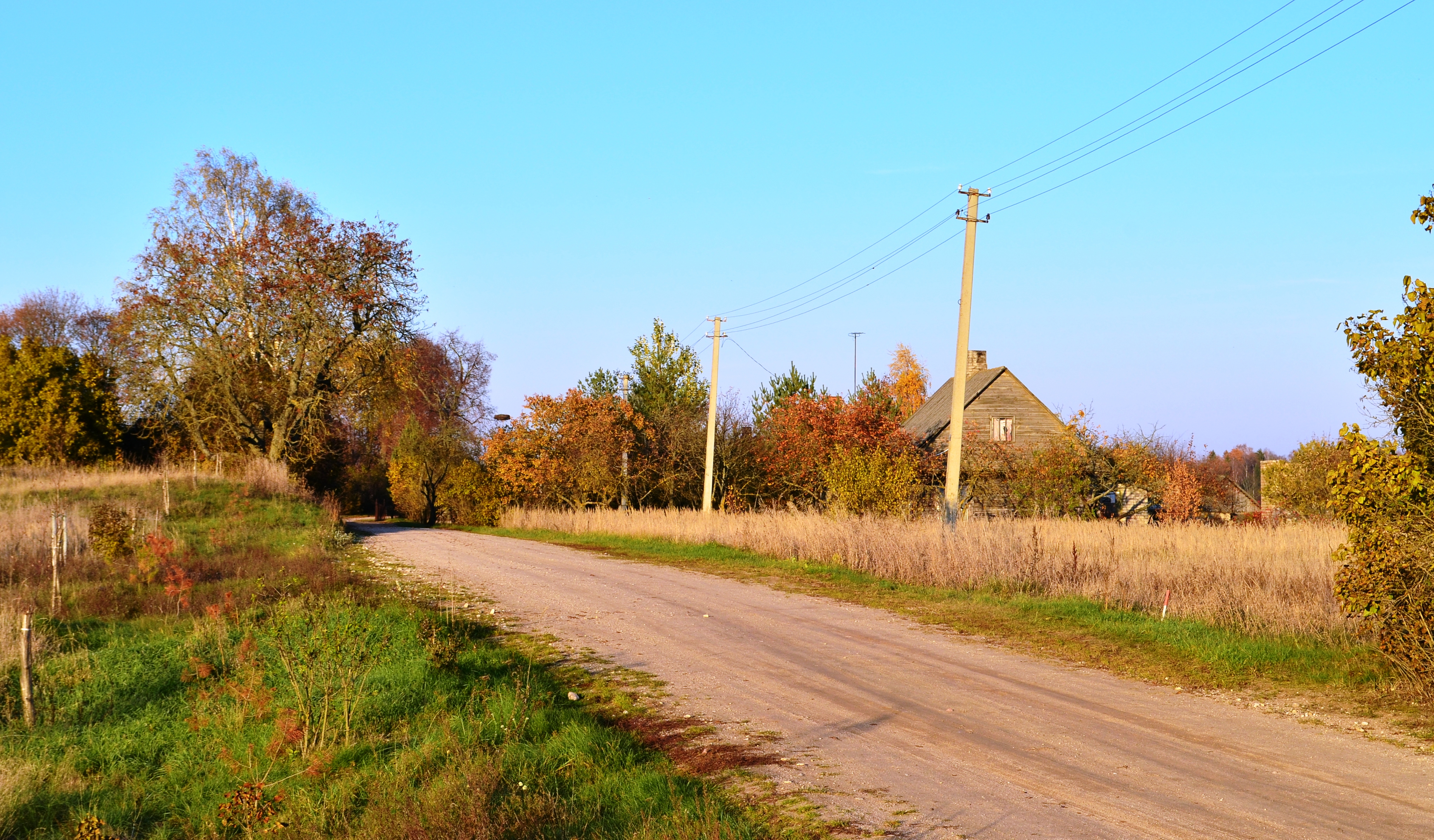

- Location in Lithuania Milžemiai (Lithuania)
- Coordinates: 55°19′19″N 24°11′10″E
- Country: Lithuania
- County: Kaunas County
- Municipality: Kėdainiai district municipality
- Eldership: Vilainiai Eldership

Population (2011)
  - Total: 8
- Time zone: UTC+2 (EET)
  - Summer (DST): UTC+3 (EEST)

Milžemiai (formerly Russian: Мильжемы, Polish: Milżemy) is a village in Kėdainiai district municipality, in Kaunas County, in central Lithuania. According to the 2011 census, the village had a population of 8 people. It is located 3 kilometres (1.9 mi) from Lančiūnava, surrounded by the Lančiūnava-Šventybrastis Forest, nearby the Suleva river. There are gravel quarries.

== Demography ==
Historical population

Year	Pop.	±% p.a.
1902	130	—
1923	153	+0.78%
1959	102	−1.12%
1970	72	−3.12%

Year	Pop.	±% p.a.
1979	20	−13.27%
1989	13	−4.22%
2001	10	−2.16%
2011	8	−2.21%

Source: 1902, 1923, 1959 & 1970, 1979, 1989, 2001, 2011
