= Katkai, Kėdainiai =

Katkai
- Village
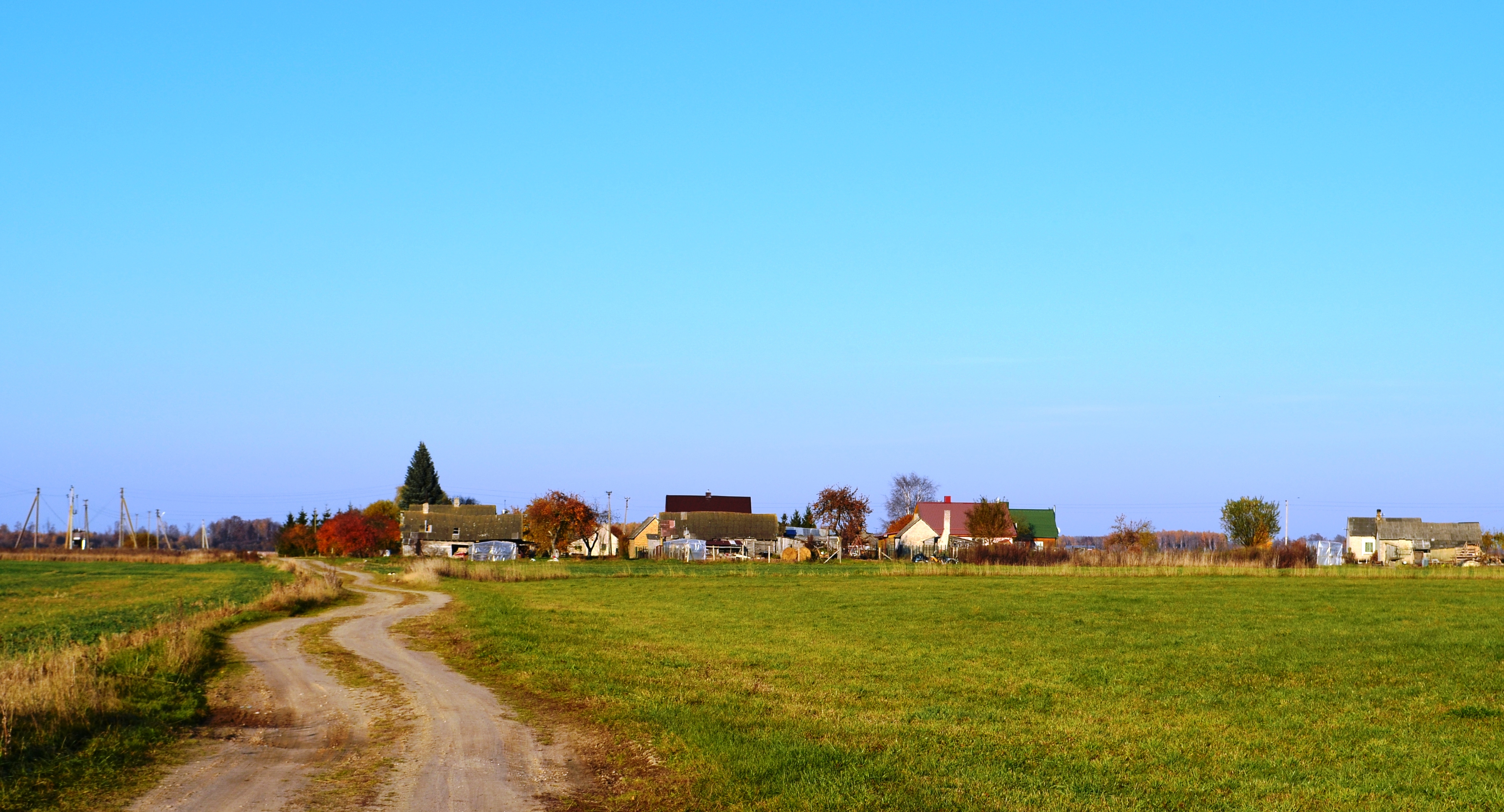

- Location in Lithuania Katkai (Lithuania)
- Coordinates: 55°18′40″N 24°04′41″E
- Country: Lithuania
- County: Kaunas County
- Municipality: Kėdainiai district municipality
- Eldership: Vilainiai Eldership

Population (2011)
  - Total: 36
- Time zone: UTC+2 (EET)
  - Summer (DST): UTC+3 (EEST)

Katkai (formerly Russian: Котки, Polish: Kotki) is a village in Kėdainiai district municipality, in Kaunas County, in central Lithuania. According to the 2011 census, the village had a population of 36 people. It is located 1.5 kilometres (0.93 mi) from Aristava, by the Malčius river.

== Demography ==
Historical population

Year	Pop.	±% p.a.
1902	88	—
1923	112	+1.16%
1959	91	−0.58%
1970	77	−1.51%

Year	Pop.	±% p.a.
1979	40	−7.02%
1989	55	+3.24%
2001	39	−2.82%
2011	36	−0.80%

Source: 1902, 1923, 1959 & 1970, 1979, 1989, 2001, 2011
