= Suleva =

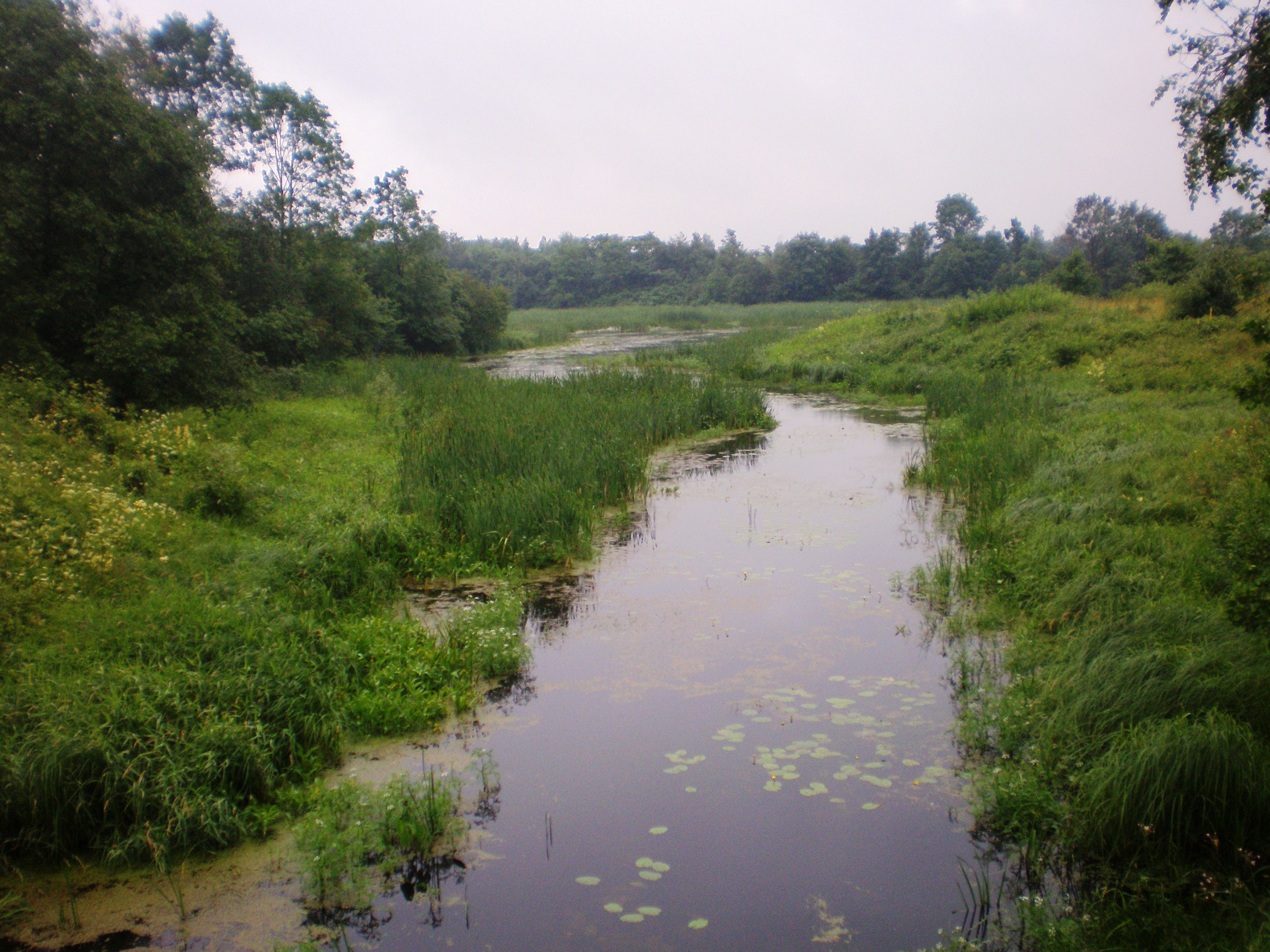
- Suleva near its mouth

Location
- Country: Lithuania
- Region: Kėdainiai district municipality, Kaunas County

Physical characteristics
- Source
  - location: Okainėliai surroundings
- Mouth: Obelis (Kapliai Reservoir) in Aukštieji Kapliai
  - coordinates: 55.2883°N 24.1553°E
- Length: 19.7 km (12.2 mi)
- Basin size: 43.0 km^{2} (16.6 sq mi)

Basin features
- Progression: Obelis→ Nevėžis→ Neman→ Baltic Sea
- Tributaries
  - right: Beržė

The Suleva (or Suliava) is a river of Kėdainiai district municipality, Kaunas County, central Lithuania. It flows for 20 kilometres (12 mi) and has a basin area of 43 km^{2} (17 sq mi).

It starts nearby Okainėliai village, 1.5 kilometres (0.93 mi) from Pavermenys. It flows southwards mostly through the Lančiūnava-Šventybrastis Forest and meets the Obelis from the right side in Aukštieji Kapliai.

Suleva passes through Milžemiai and Jaskaičiai villages.

The hydronym derives from Lithuanian word sula ('sap', 'juice').
