= Lančiūnava–Šventybrastis Forest =

Forest in Kėdainiai District Municipality, central Lithuania

Lančiūnava-Šventybrastis Forest Lithuanian: Lančiūnavos–Šventybrasčio miškai
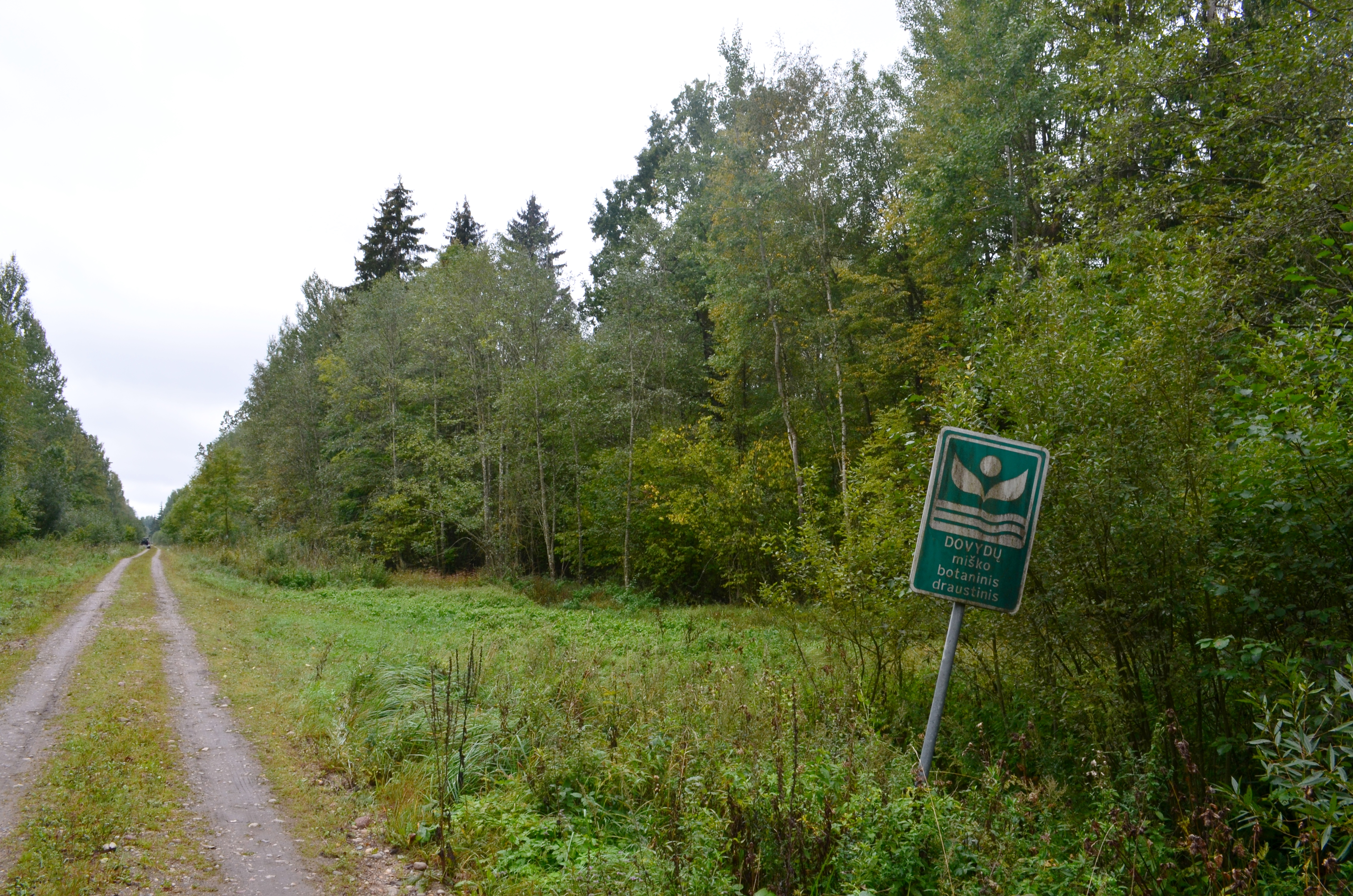
- The Dovydai Forest Botanical Sanctuary in the Lančiūnava-Šventybrastis Forest

- Location within Lithuania
- Interactive map of Lančiūnava-Šventybrastis Forest

Geography
- Location: Kėdainiai District Municipality, Lithuania
- Coordinates: 55.400°N 24.116°E
- Area: 58.9 km^{2} (22.7 sq mi)

Ecology
- Forest cover: birch, ash, aspen
- Fauna: wild boar, roe deer, red fox, moose, hare, gray wolf

The Lančiūnava–Šventybrastis Forest (Lithuanian: Lančiūnavos–Šventybrasčio miškai) is a forest in Kėdainiai District Municipality, central Lithuania, located 10 kilometres (6.2 mi) north east to Kėdainiai, around Lančiūnava and Šventybrastis villages. It covers an area of 5,890 hectares (14,600 acres). It consists of smaller forests: the Lančiūnava Forest, the Lepšynė Forest, the Pavermenys Forest, the Šventybrastis Forest, the Apytalaukis Forest, the Stebuliai Forest. The forest belongs to the Nevėžis basin. The main rivers, draining the forest, are the Malčius, the Alkupis, the Suleva, the Šumera. The rivers' courses are mostly channelized. The relief is flat, marshy in places.

As of 2005, 43% of the area was covered by birch, 7% by spruce, 17% by aspen, 12% by ash, 4% by oak, 9% by black alder, 8% by white alder tree groups. The fauna of the forest consists of wild boar, roe deer, moose, red fox, raccoon dog, gray wolf, pine marten, badger, hare, squirrel, beaver, also there are cranes, grey-headed woodpeckers, white-backed woodpeckers, middle spotted woodpeckers, corn crakes, black storks, white-tailed eagles, European honey buzzards, lesser spotted eagles. There are several protected areas in the forest: the Dovydai Forest Botanical Sanctuary, the Ilgatrakis Forest Botanical Zoological Sanctuary, the Lančiūnava Forest Botanical Sanctuary. The Lančiūnava Oak Tree grew in the forest (a nature heritage monument since 1960 but decayed around 2018).

The villages of Lančiūnava, Lepšynė, Užvalkiai, Rudžiai, Būdai, Milžemiai, Pagilupys, Gaisai, Grąžčiai, Lalai and Stebuliai are inside the forest or on its edges.

== Images ==
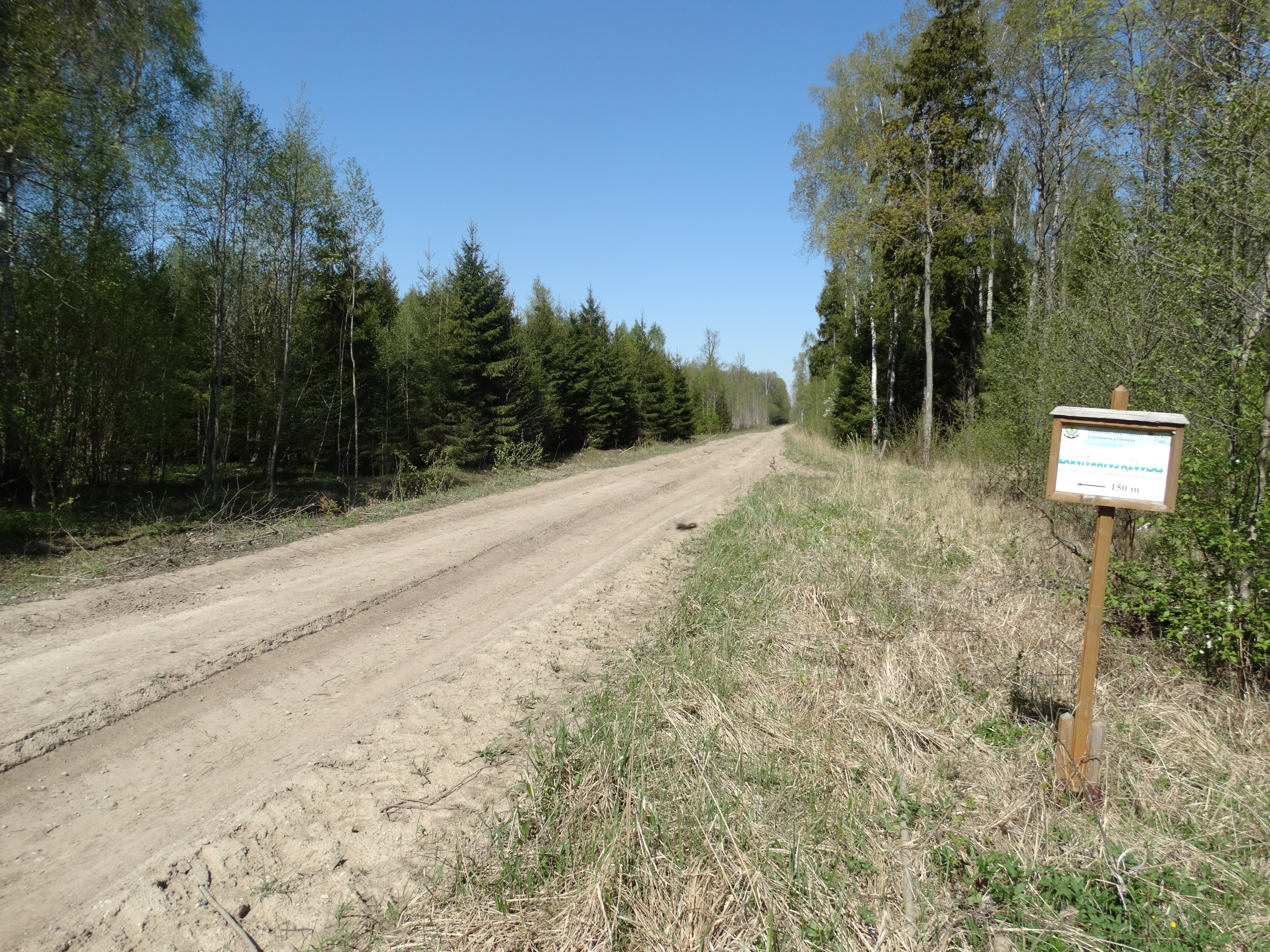
Road through the forest

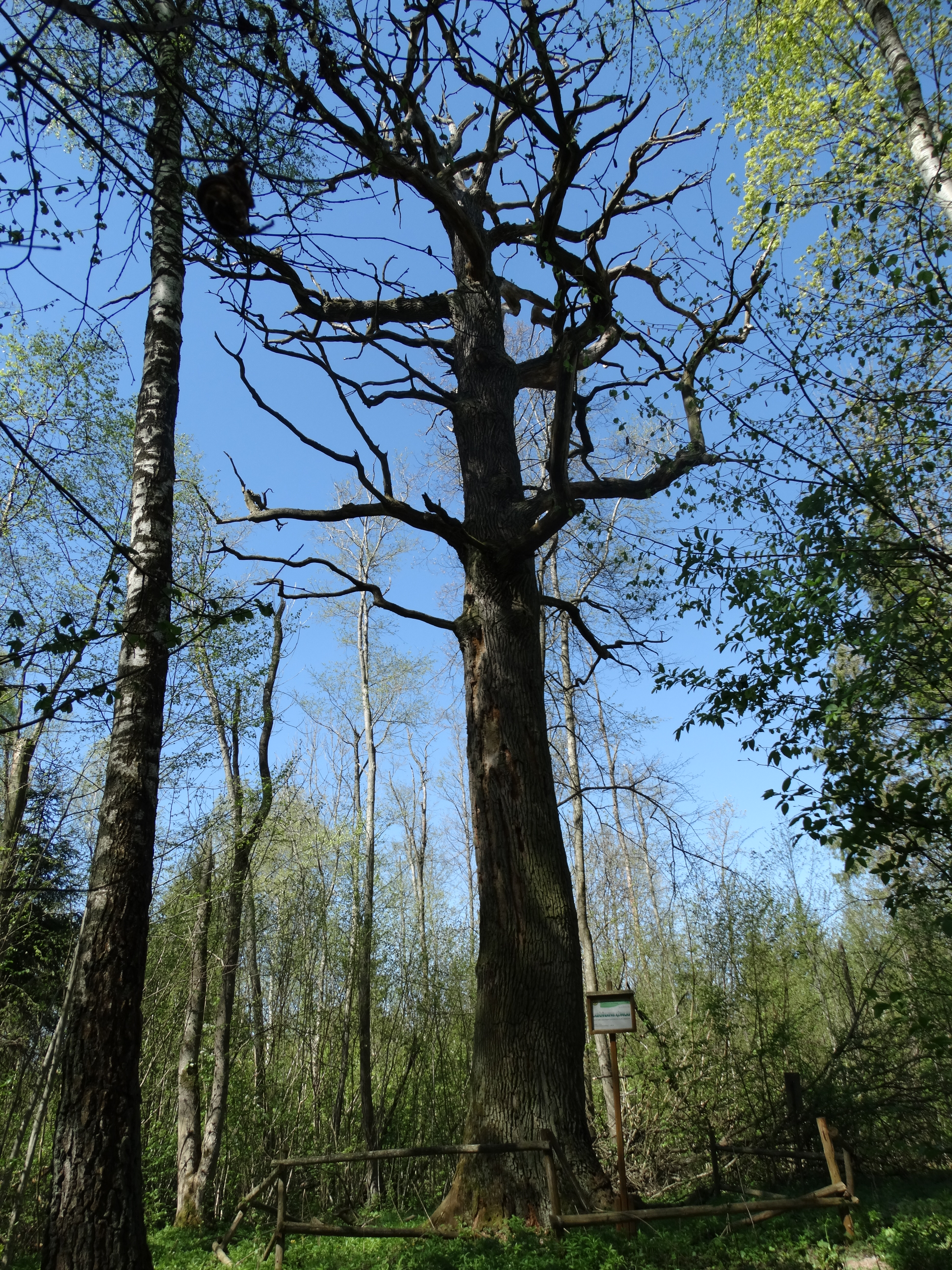
The Lančiūnava Oak Tree in 2014

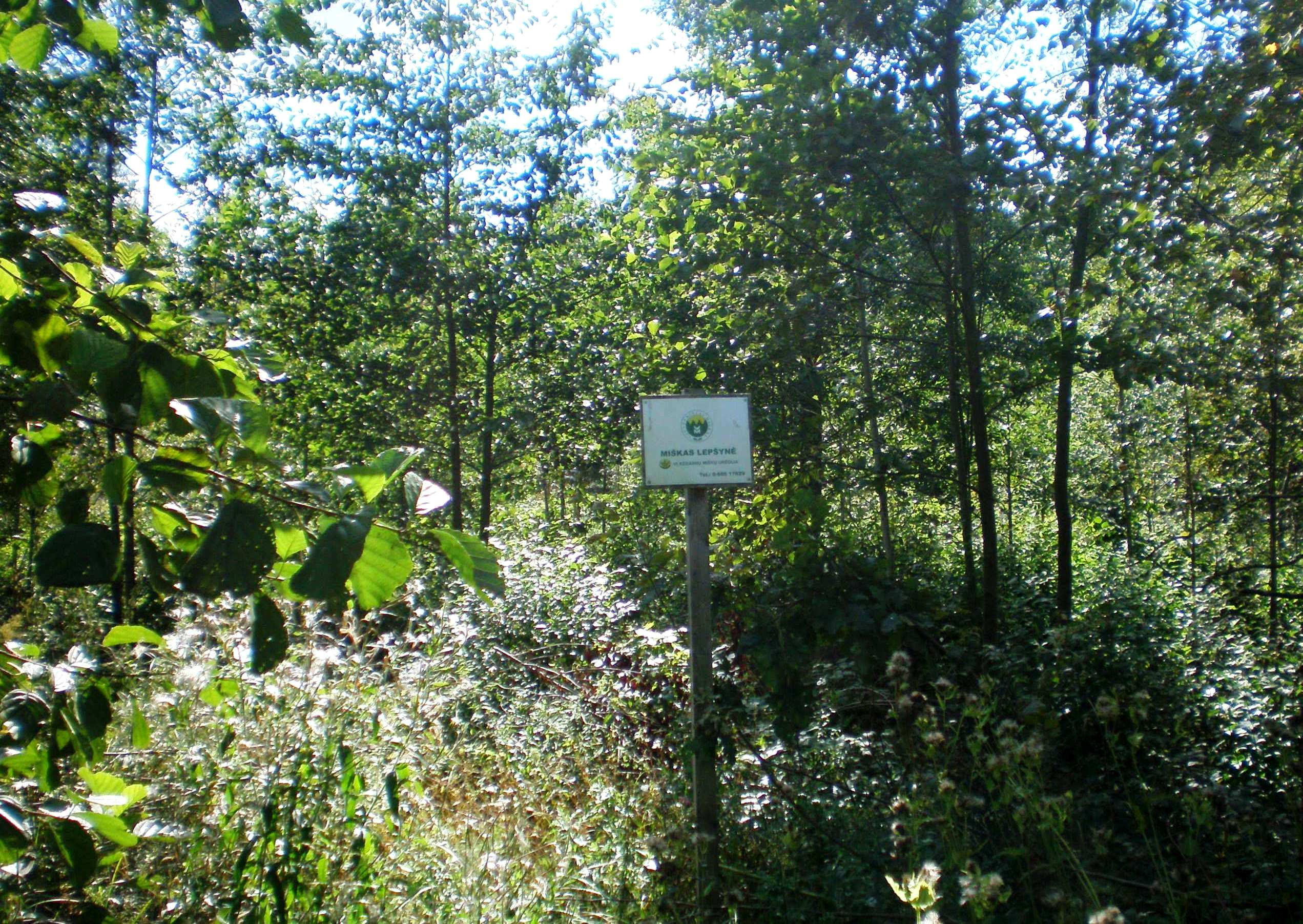
The Lepšynė Forest sign

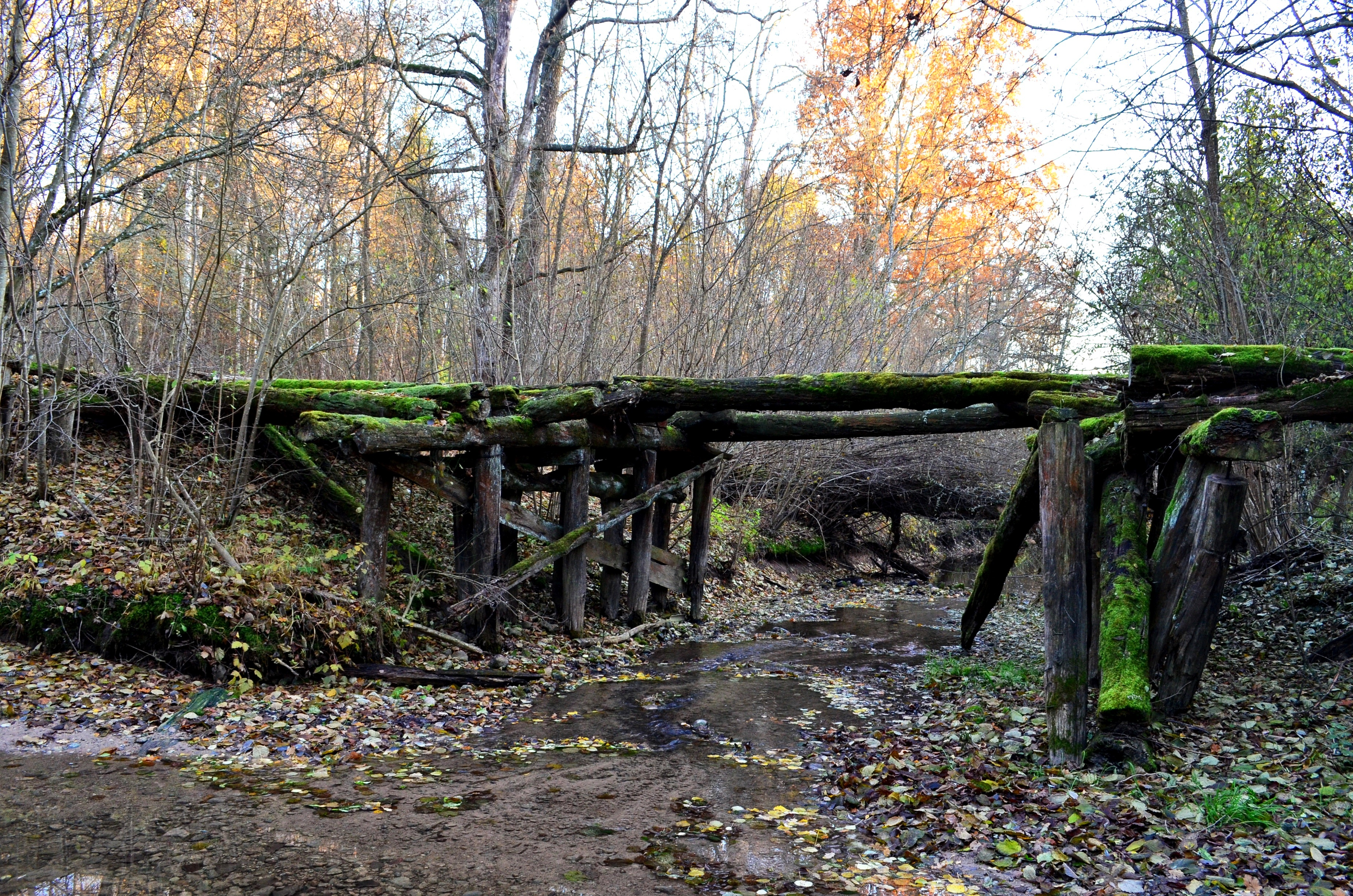
The Šumera river flowing through the Ilgatrakis Forest
