= Šumera =

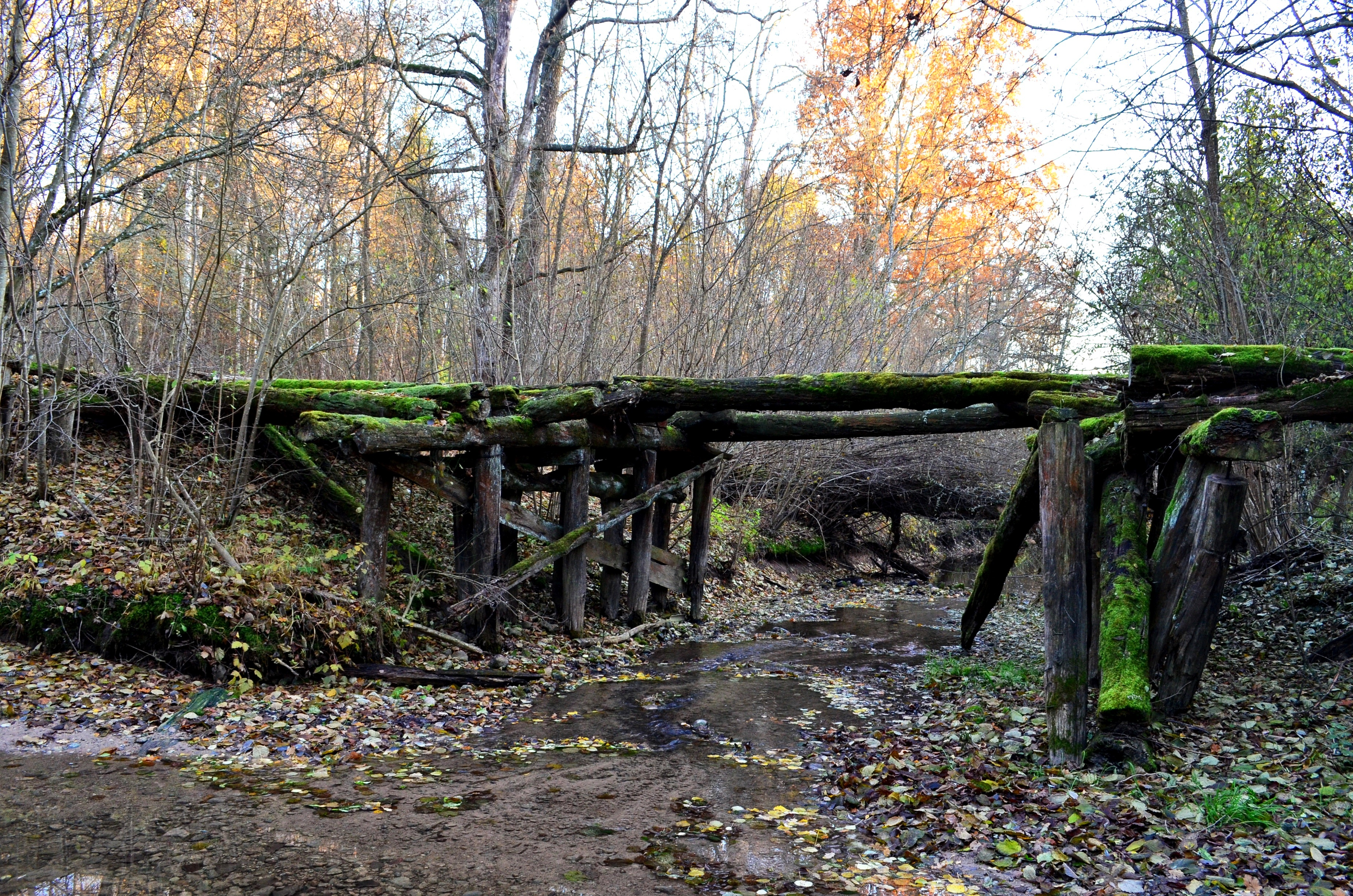
- Šumera in the Lančiūnava-Šventybrastis Forest

Location
- Country: Lithuania
- Region: Kėdainiai district municipality, Kaunas County

Physical characteristics
- Source
  - location: Dargužiai village surroundings
- Mouth: Obelis
  - coordinates: 55.2851°N 24.1886°E
- Length: 26.2 km (16.3 mi)
- Basin size: 89 km^{2} (34 sq mi)
- Discharge
  - average: 0.45 m³/s

Basin features
- Progression: Obelis→ Nevėžis→ Neman→ Baltic Sea
- Tributaries
  - left: Juodupis, Ringa

The Šumera is a river in the Kėdainiai district municipality, Kaunas County, central Lithuania. It flows for 26.2 kilometres (16.3 mi) and has a basin area of 89 km^{2} (34 sq mi). The river flows into the Obelis (from the right side), a tributary of the Nevėžis, which is in turn a tributary of the Neman.

The Šumera starts nearby former Dargužiai village and flows mostly southwards through agriculture lands and the Lančiūnava-Šventybrastis Forest. It meets the Obelis in Pašumerys village.

The name Šumera (or Šiumera) is of obscure origin, maybe derived from Lithuanian Germanism šiumas ('foam, decoction').
