= Bubliai Reservoir =

Reservoir in Lithuania

- Bublių tvenkinys (Lithuanian)
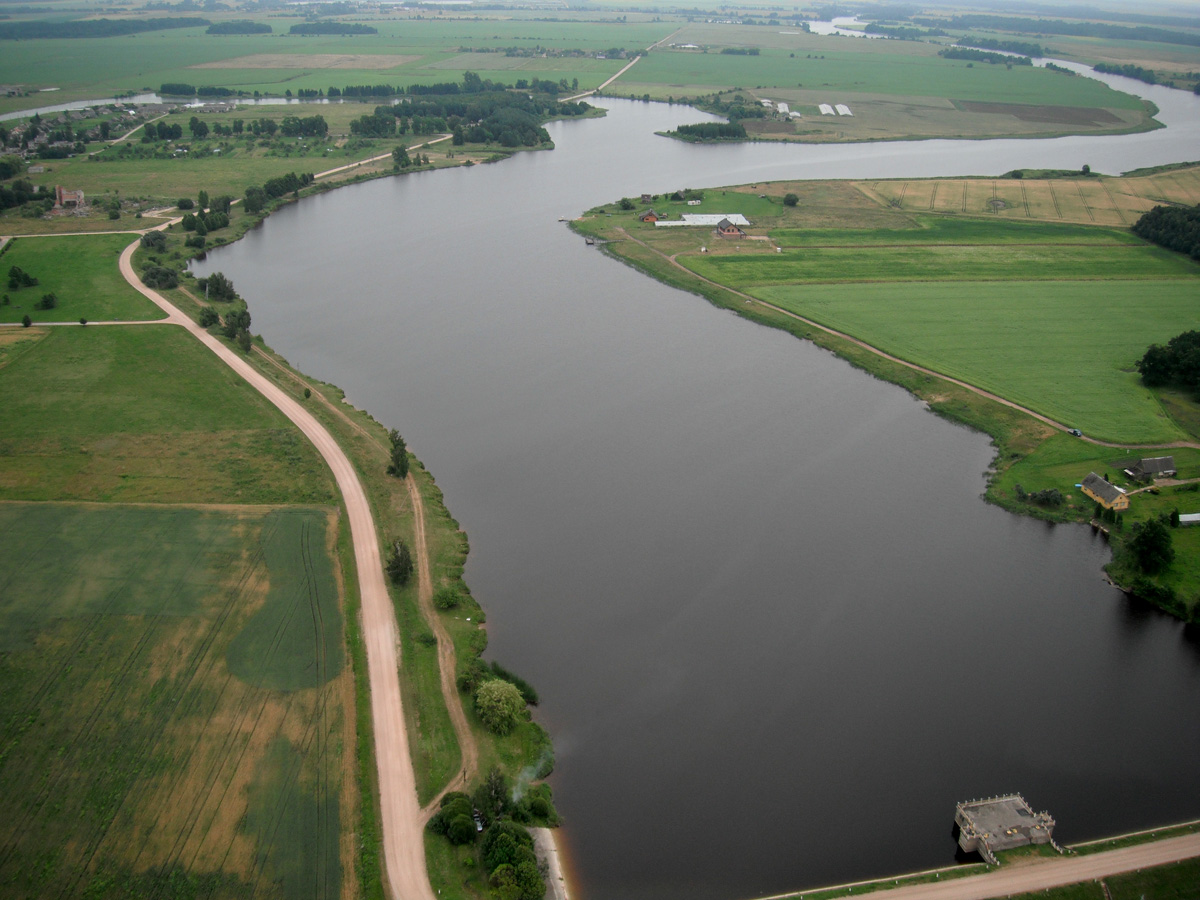
- Bubliai Reservoir next to Aristava

- Location within Lithuania Location within Kėdainiai District Municipality
- Location: Kėdainiai District Municipality, Lithuania
- Coordinates: 55°16′55″N 24°05′16″E
- Part of: Obelis→ Nevėžis→ Neman→ Baltic Sea
- Primary inflows: Lankesa, Obelis, Malčius II, Piltyna, Gegužinė, Aukupė, Aukupėnas
- Primary outflows: Obelis
- First flooded: 1980
- Max. length: 6.9 km (4.3 mi)
- Max. width: 0.27 km (0.17 mi)
- Surface area: 1.52 km^{2} (0.59 sq mi)
- Average depth: 4.2 m (14 ft)
- Max. depth: 13.2 m (43 ft)
- Water volume: 0.06438 km^{3} (0.01545 cu mi)
- Shore length^{1}: 39 km (24 mi)
- Surface elevation: 48.4 m (159 ft)
- Settlements: Aristava, Bubliai, Daukainiai, Aukštieji Kapliai
- ^{1} Shore length is not a well-defined measure.

The Bubliai Reservoir is an artificial lake in Kėdainiai District Municipality, central Lithuania. It is located 5 kilometres (3.1 mi) east from Kėdainiai, next to Aristava village. It was created in 1980, when a dam on the Obelis river had been built next to Bubliai village. In 2002, the dam was reconstructed and a small hydroelectric plant (of 160 kW) added.

The Bubliai Reservoir is used for irrigation, fishery, and hydroelectric energy production. The fish species inhabiting the reservoir are carp, pike, catfish, roach, and bream.

Shores of the reservoir are quite straight and low. The reservoir is surrounded mostly by agriculture lands. Some other smaller ponds and reservoirs (the Kapliai Reservoir, the Piltyna Reservoir, the Aristava Reservoir) empty into the Bubliai Reservoir.

The Bubliai Reservoir itself empties into the Juodkiškiai Reservoir. The dam uses siphon spillway.

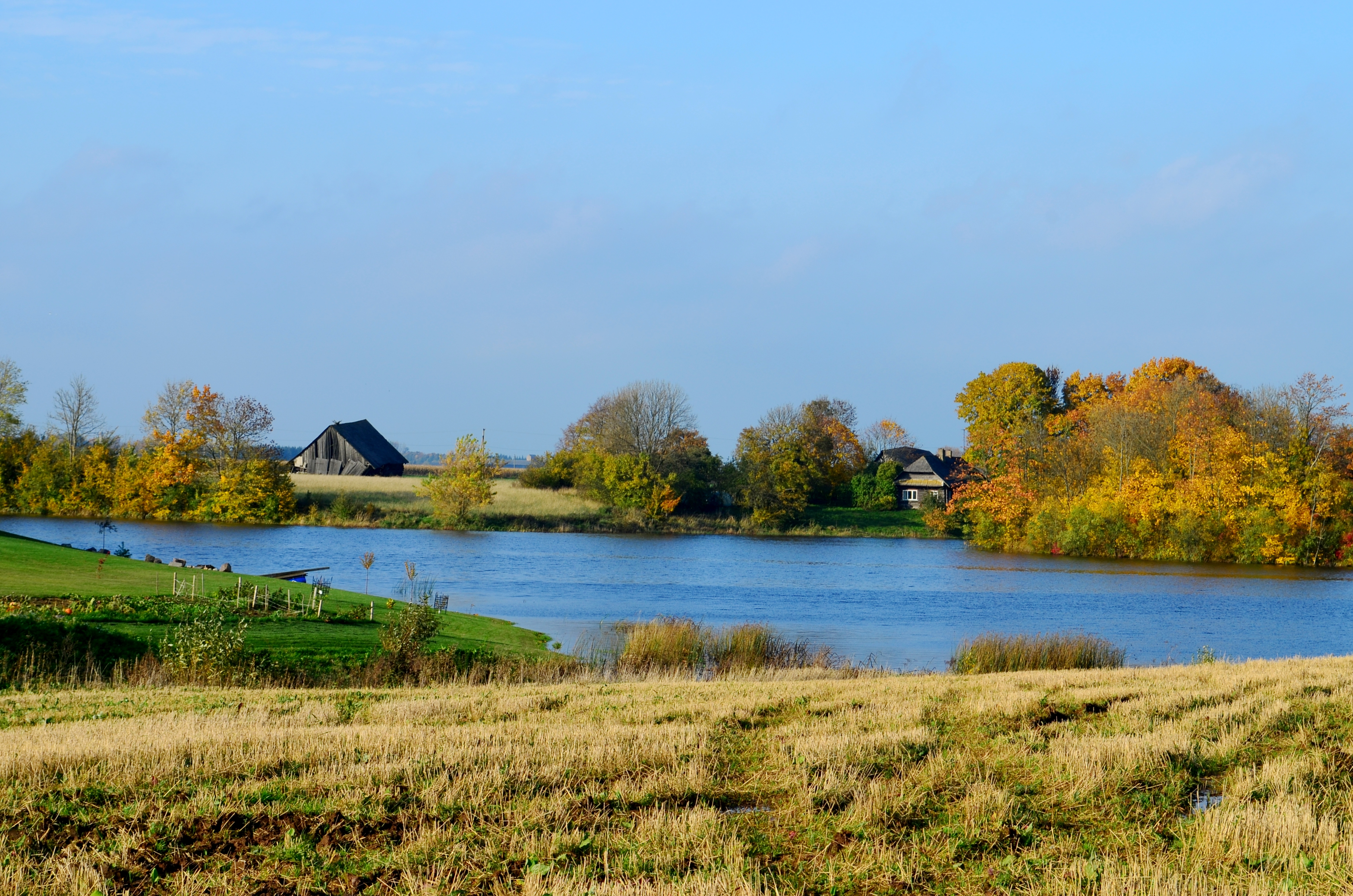
View to the Bubliai Reservoir in Daukainiai
