= Malčius =

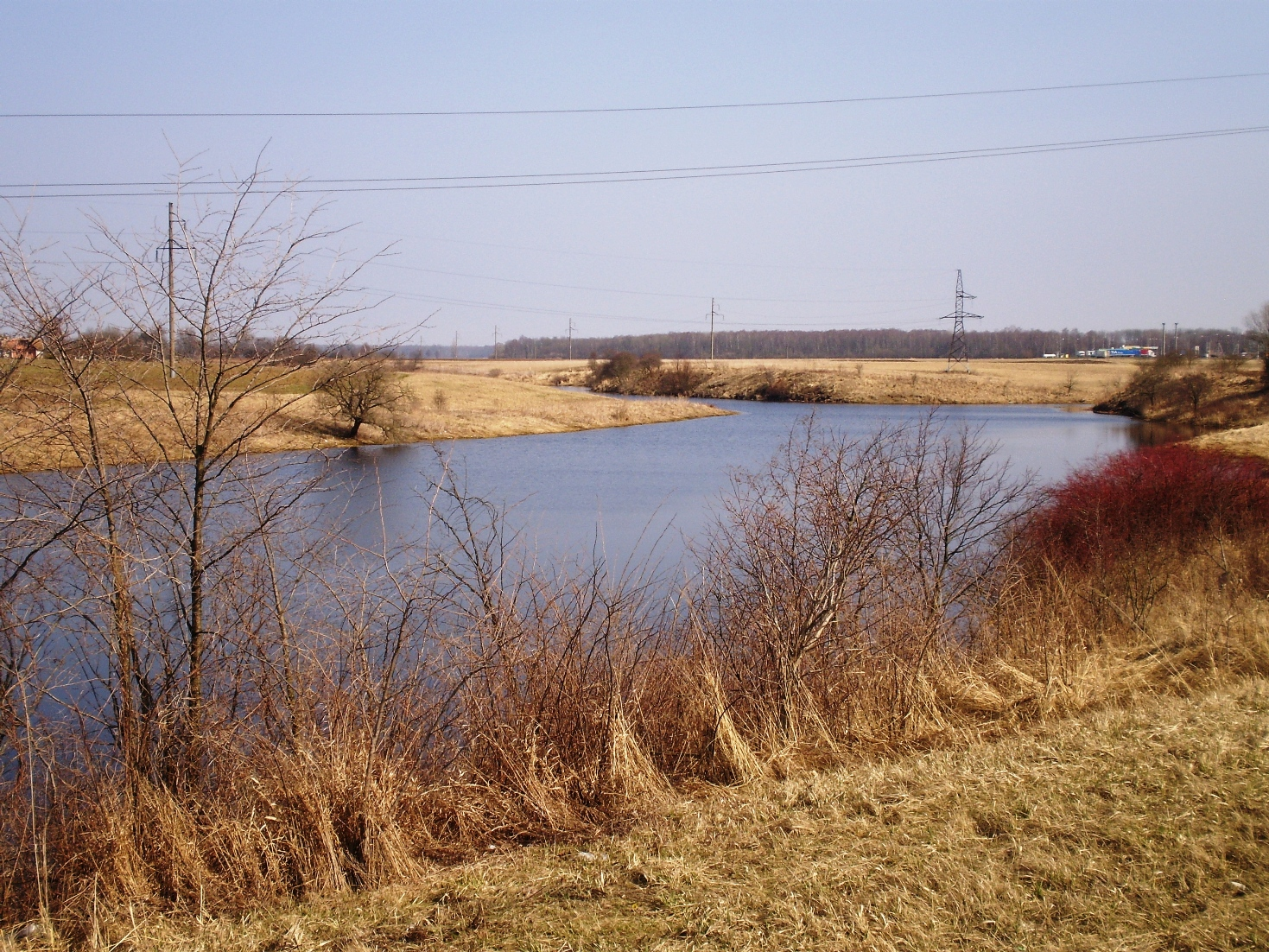
- The lower course of the Malčius (the Malčius Pond)

Location
- Country: Lithuania
- Region: Kėdainiai district municipality, Kaunas County

Physical characteristics
- Source
  - location: Lančiūnava-Šventybrastis Forest
- Mouth: Obelis (Juodkiškiai Reservoir) in Aristavėlė
  - coordinates: 55°17′25″N 24°3′21″E
- Length: 18.3 km (11.4 mi)
- Basin size: 51.3 km^{2} (19.8 sq mi)

Basin features
- Progression: Obelis→ Nevėžis→ Neman→ Baltic Sea
- Tributaries
  - left: Drigantas

The Malčius is a river of Kėdainiai district municipality, Kaunas County, central Lithuania. It flows for 18.3 kilometres (11.4 mi) and has a basin area of 51.3 square kilometres (19.8 sq mi). It starts in the Lančiūnava-Šventybrastis Forest and flows mostly southwards. It meets the Obelis river (from the right side) by Aristavėlė village.

The entire course is channelized. Malčius passes through the villages of Pliupai, Stebuliai, Katkai, Aristava and Aristavėlė. Several ponds (Malčius, Aristavėlė 1st, Aristavėlė 2nd) are on the Malčius river.

The hydronym derives from Lithuanian verbs malšyti, malšinti ('to still, to quieten'), malšti ('to become still, to relent').
