= Stebuliai, Kėdainiai =

Stebuliai
- Village
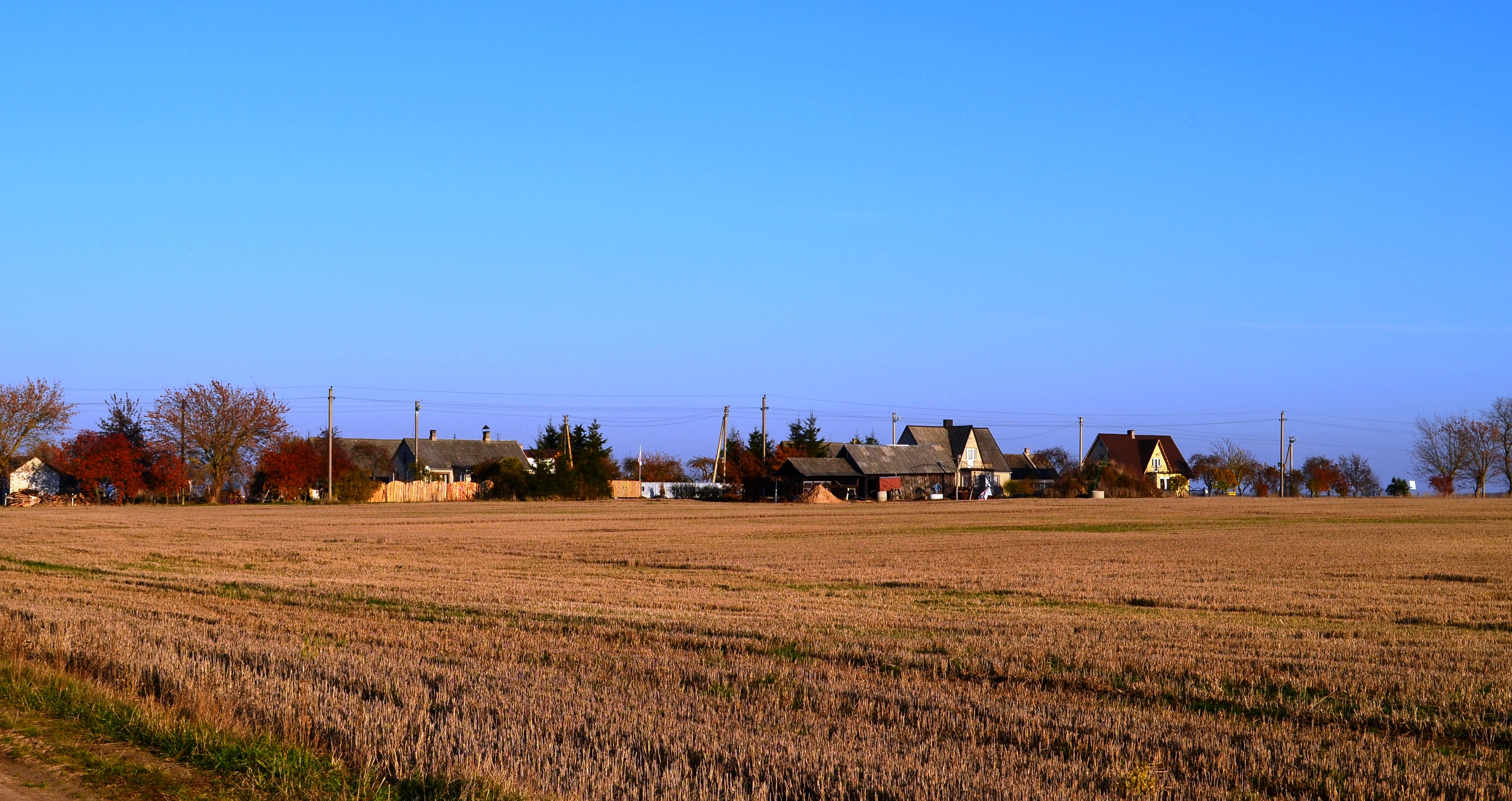

- Location in Lithuania Stebuliai (Lithuania)
- Coordinates: 55°19′08″N 24°06′29″E
- Country: Lithuania
- County: Kaunas County
- Municipality: Kėdainiai district municipality
- Eldership: Vilainiai Eldership

Population (2011)
  - Total: 35
- Time zone: UTC+2 (EET)
  - Summer (DST): UTC+3 (EEST)

Stebuliai (formerly Russian: Стебули) is a village in Kėdainiai district municipality, in Kaunas County, in central Lithuania. According to the 2011 census, the village had a population of 35 people. It is located 3 kilometres (1.9 mi) from Aristava, nearby the A8 highway and the Lančiūnava-Šventybrastis Forest.

It was a folwark till the mid-20th century.

== Demography ==
Historical population

Year	Pop.	±% p.a.
1902	27	—
1923	19	−1.66%
1959	50	+2.72%
1970	83	+4.72%

Year	Pop.	±% p.a.
1979	51	−5.27%
1989	32	−4.55%
2001	36	+0.99%
2011	35	−0.28%

Source: 1902, 1923, 1959 & 1970, 1979, 1989, 2001, 2011
