= Obelis =

River in Lithuania

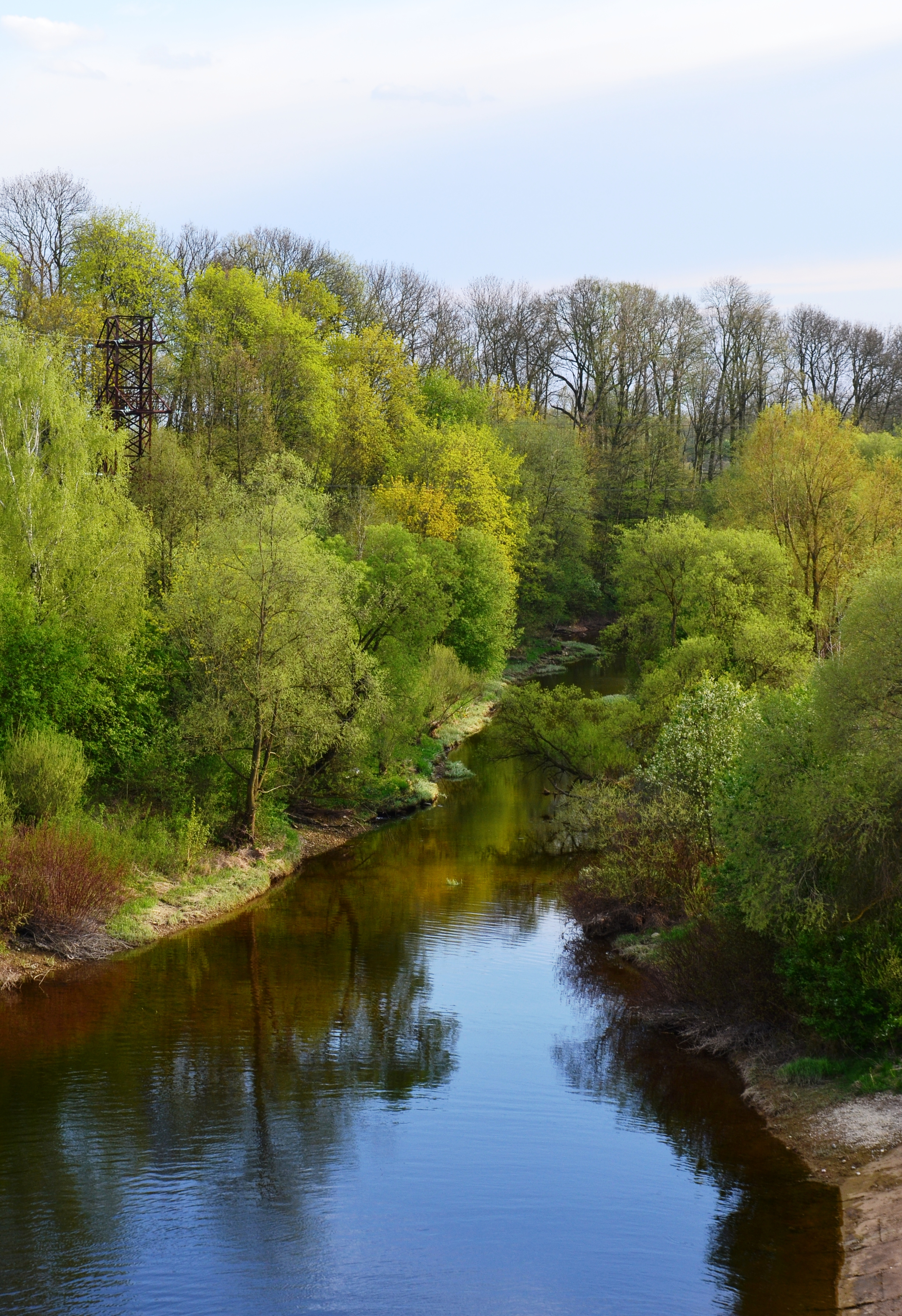
- Obelis near Juodkiškiai village

Location
- Country: Lithuania
- Region: Ukmergė district municipality, Kėdainiai district municipality

Physical characteristics
- Source
  - location: Near Siesikai
  - coordinates: 55.3231°N 24.4875°E
- Mouth: Nevėžis in Kėdainiai
  - coordinates: 55.2704°N 23.9582°E
- Length: 53.3 km (33.1 mi)
- Basin size: 673.8 km^{2} (260.2 sq mi)
- Discharge
  - average: 2.7 m³/s
  - minimum: 0.001 m³/s
  - maximum: 227 m³/s

Basin features
- Progression: Nevėžis→ Neman→ Baltic Sea
- Tributaries
  - left: Arvystas, Lankesa, Piltyna
  - right: Rudekšna, Indija, Šumera, Suleva, Malčius II, Malčius

The Obelis is a river in the Ukmergė district municipality and Kėdainiai district municipality in central Lithuania. It flows for 53.3 kilometres (33.1 mi) and has a basin area of 673.8 km^{2} (260.2 sq mi). It is a left tributary of the Nevėžis into which it flows near Kėdainiai.

The river valley is 200–220 m wide and 8–14 m high. The width of the river course is 5–12 m. The rapidness of the current is 0,2–0,3 meters per second. Kapliai Reservoir, Bubliai Reservoir and Juodkiškiai Reservoir dam the Obelis river. It flows through Paobelys, Šėta, Aukštieji Kapliai, Aristava, Paobelys, and meets the Nevėžis in Kėdainiai.

The river name Obelis derives from the Lithuanian word obelis ('apple tree').
