= Lančiūnava =

- Village
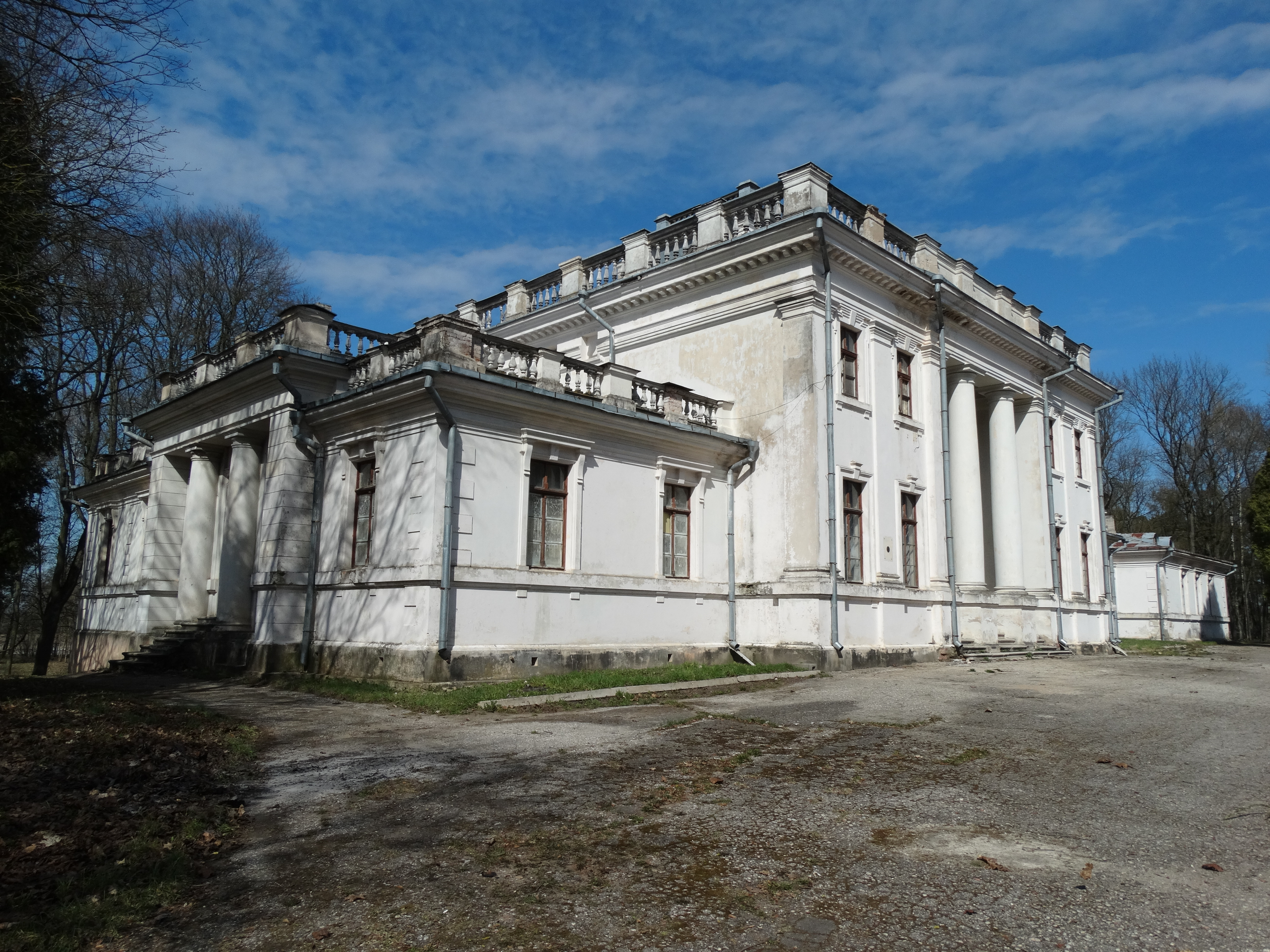

- Location in Lithuania Lančiūnava (Lithuania)
- Coordinates: 55°20′49″N 24°09′11″E
- Country: Lithuania
- County: Kaunas County
- Municipality: Kėdainiai district municipality
- Eldership: Vilainiai Eldership

Population (2011)
  - Total: 503
- Time zone: UTC+2 (EET)
  - Summer (DST): UTC+3 (EEST)

Lančiūnava (formerly Russian: Ланчуново, Polish: Łączynów, Łonczynów, Łanczanów, Łanczunowo) is a village in Kėdainiai district municipality, in Kaunas County, in central Lithuania. According to the 2011 census, the village had a population of 503 people. It is located 13 kilometres (8.1 mi) from Kėdainiai, by the A8 highway, surrounded by the Lančiūnava-Šventybrastis Forest. There is a school, a vocational school, a kindergarten, a library, a former manor with a park, and the Catholic church of St. Casimir (built in 1880).

== History ==
The Lančiūnava manor and village have been known since 1587. The manor was the property of the Kognowicki family, who were of Italian descent. At the beginning of the 20th century, a nobleman, Stanisław Kognowicki, rebuilt the palace. The Kognowickis were known for cruel oppression of serfs.

During the Soviet era, Lančiūnava developed as a sovkhoz with an agriculture and technology school (opened in 1940).

== Demography ==
Historical population

Year	Pop.	±% p.a.
1902	163	—
1923	172	+0.26%
1959	303	+1.59%
1966	526	+8.20%
1970	732	+8.61%
1978	937	+3.13%

Year	Pop.	±% p.a.
1979	514	−45.14%
1985	920	+10.19%
1989	918	−0.05%
2001	655	−2.77%
2006	635	−0.62%
2011	503	−4.55%

Source: 1902, 1923, 1959 & 1970, 1979, 1989, 2001, 2011

== Images ==
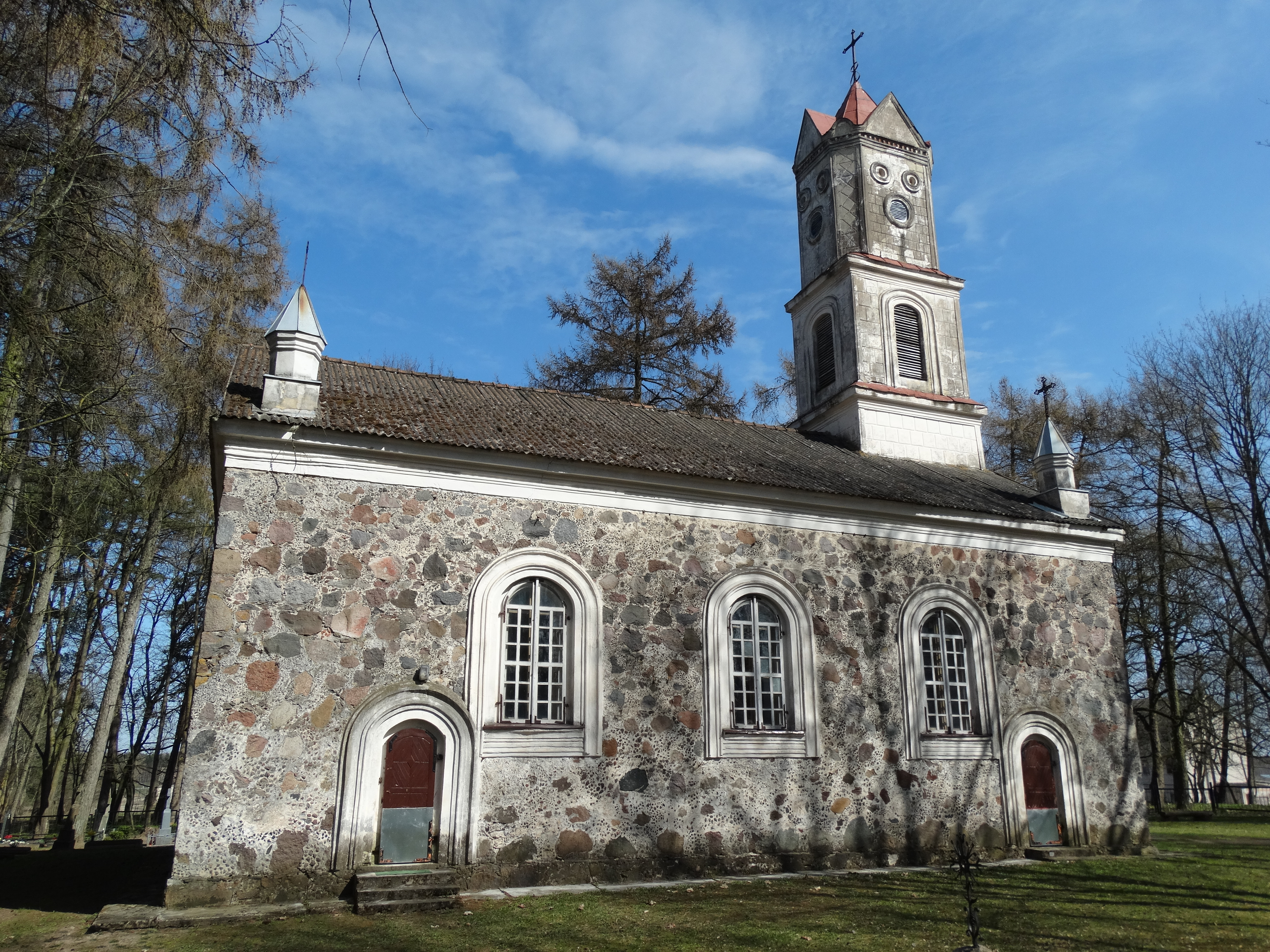
Lančiūnava church

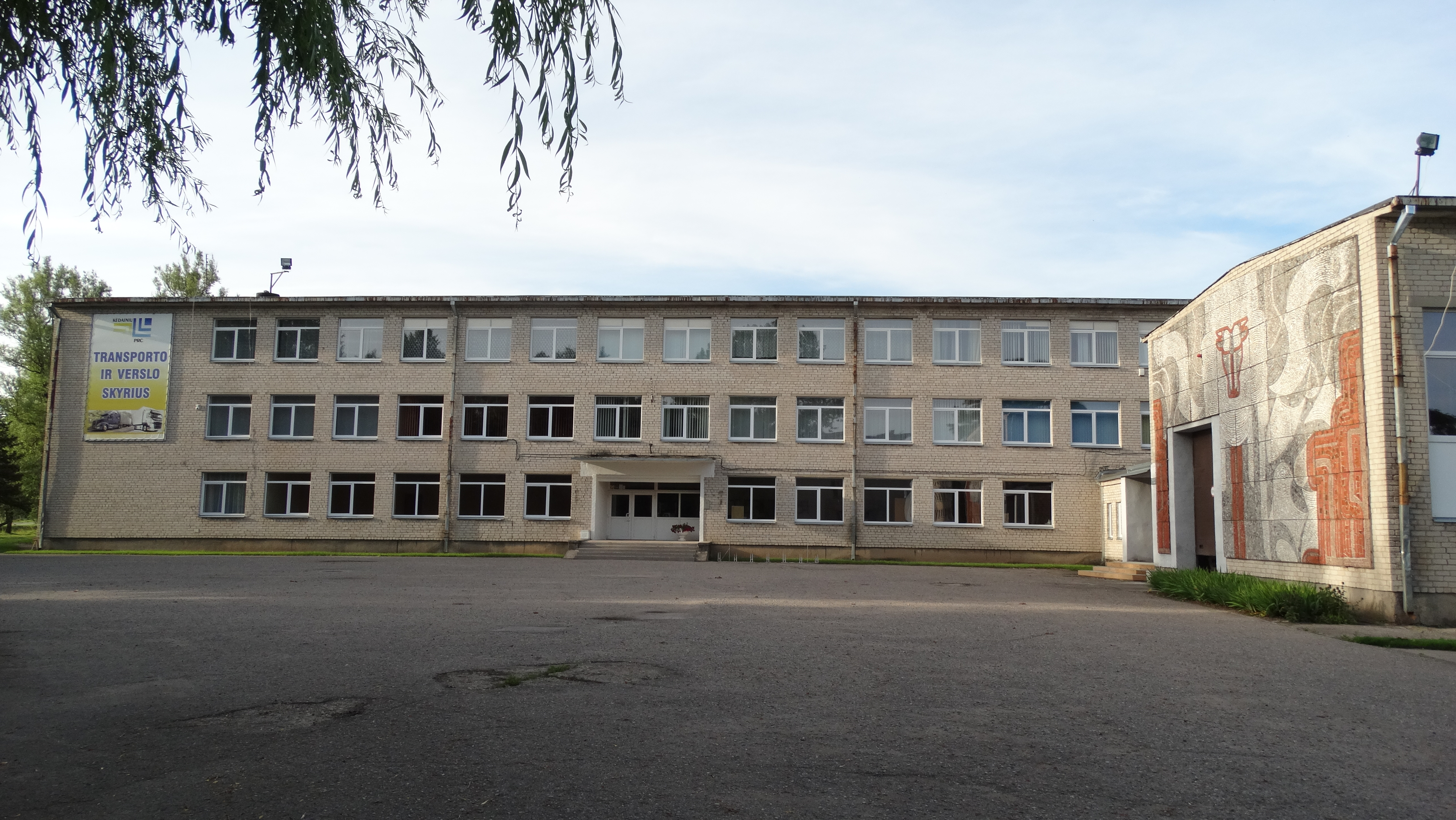
Lančiūnava vocational school (former agriculture school)

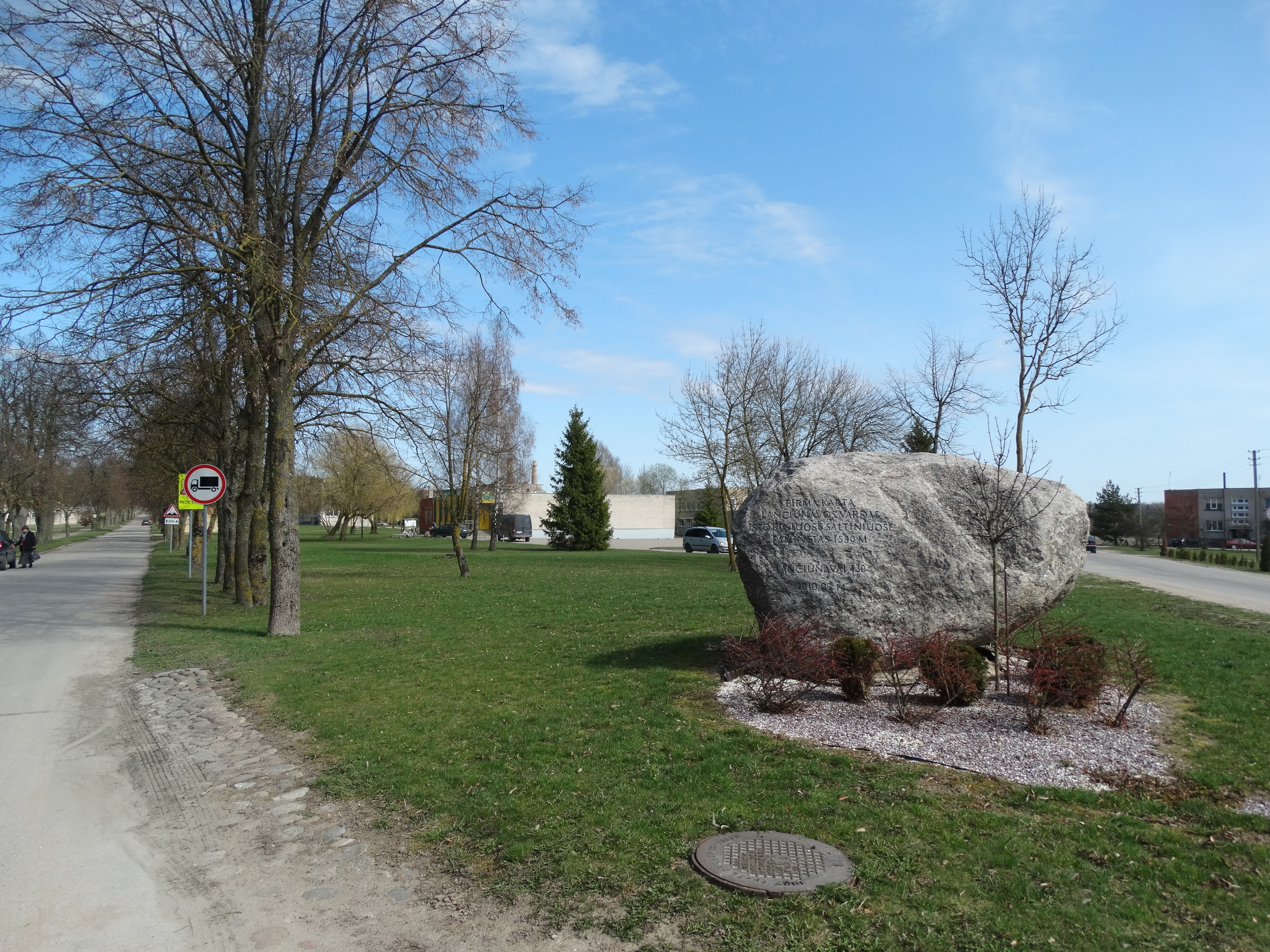
Lančiūnava entrance

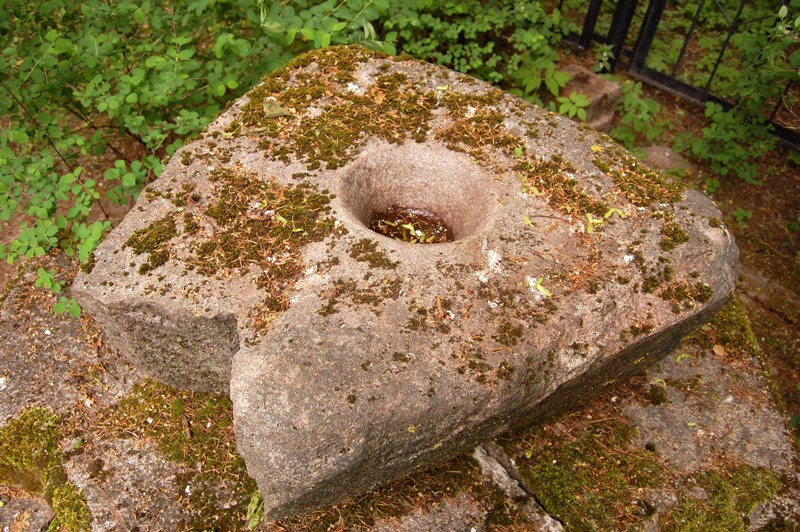
Lančiūnava sacred stone with engraved flat-bottomed bowl
