= Aristava =

- Village
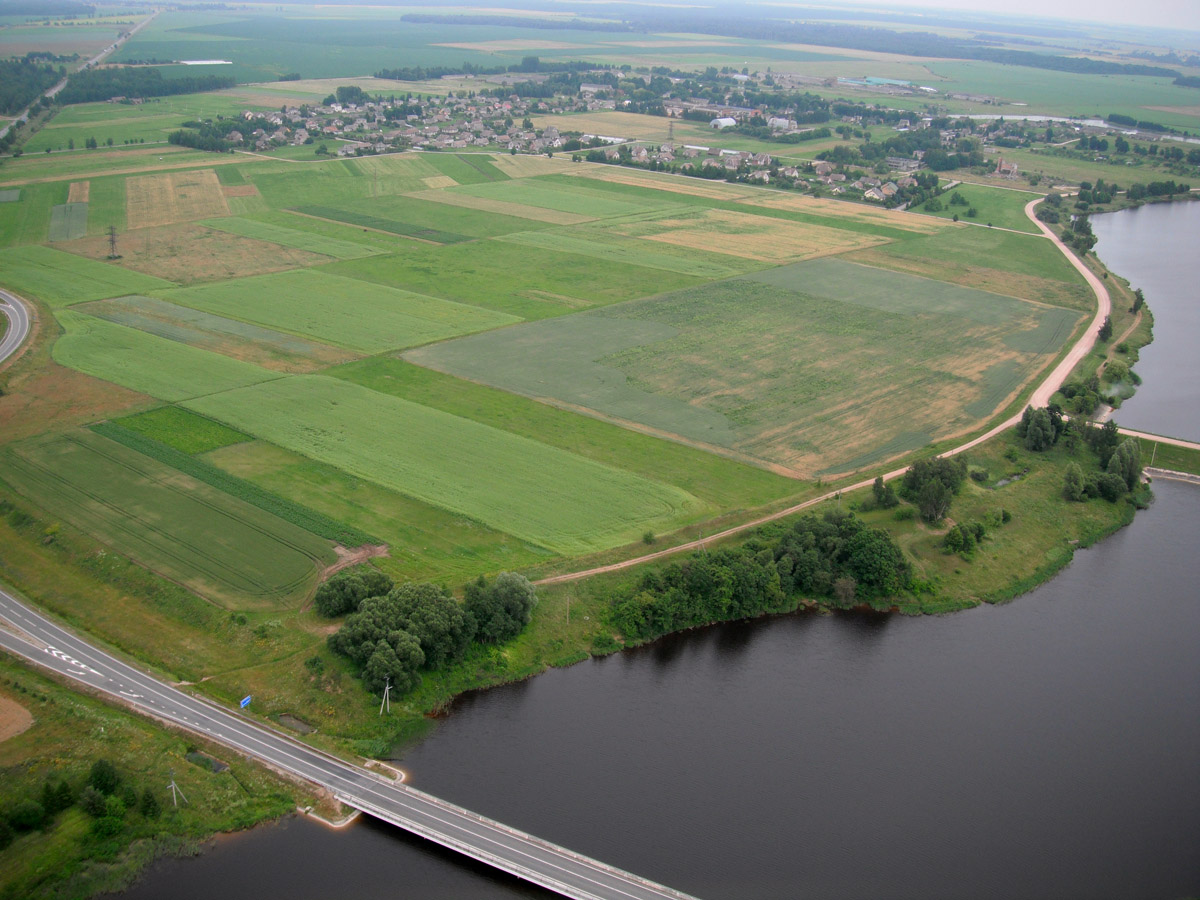
- Aerial photo of the village.

- Location in Lithuania Aristava (Lithuania)
- Coordinates: 55°17′31″N 24°05′20″E
- Country: Lithuania
- County: Kaunas County
- Municipality: Kėdainiai district municipality
- Eldership: Vilainiai Eldership

Population (2011)
  - Total: 489
- Time zone: UTC+2 (EET)
  - Summer (DST): UTC+3 (EEST)

Aristava (formerly Lukšiakaimis, Russian: Орвистово, Лукшакаймис, Polish: Orwistów) is a village in Kėdainiai district municipality, in Kaunas County, in central Lithuania. According to the 2011 census, the village had a population of 489 people. It is located 6 kilometres (3.7 mi) from Kėdainiai, next to the Bubliai Reservoir on the Obelis river, by the Malčius and the Malčius 2nd rivulets. There is a big road junction: the A8 highway, the road to Cinkiškiai via Kėdainiai (KK229), the road to Ukmergė (KK145). The village has a library, a former school, and a stock farm.

== History ==
The Aristava manor of duke Algimantas has been known since 1371 when it was mentioned by Hermann von Wartberge. The former manor had been located in Aristavėlė but the last palace building was transferred to the Museum of Lithuanian Folk Life.

During the Soviet era, Aristava developed as a central settlement of the "Antanas Sniečkus" kolkhoz. Aristava is home to a library (since 1947), and a culture house (since 1967). Several "Aristava" settlements (including Lukšiakiemis village) were merged into Aristava kolkhoz village on June 3, 1952.

== Demography ==
Historical population

Year	Pop.	±% p.a.
1923	197	—
1959	68	−2.91%
1970	104	+3.94%
1974	404	+40.39%
1979	588	+7.80%

Year	Pop.	±% p.a.
1984	593	+0.17%
1989	606	+0.43%
2001	643	+0.50%
2011	489	−2.70%

Source: 1902, 1923, 1959 & 1970, 1979, 1989, 2001, 2011

== Gallery ==
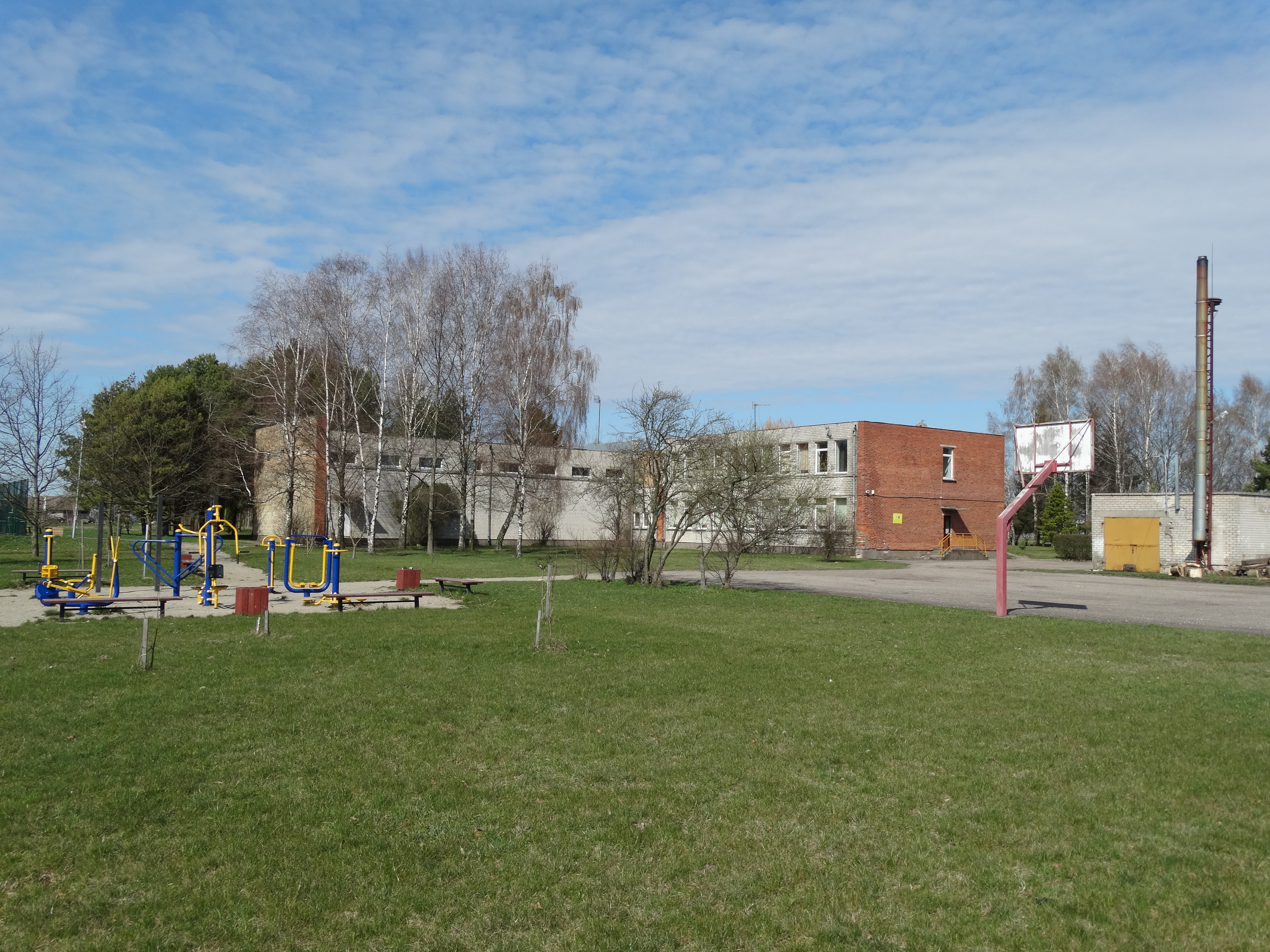
Aristava school

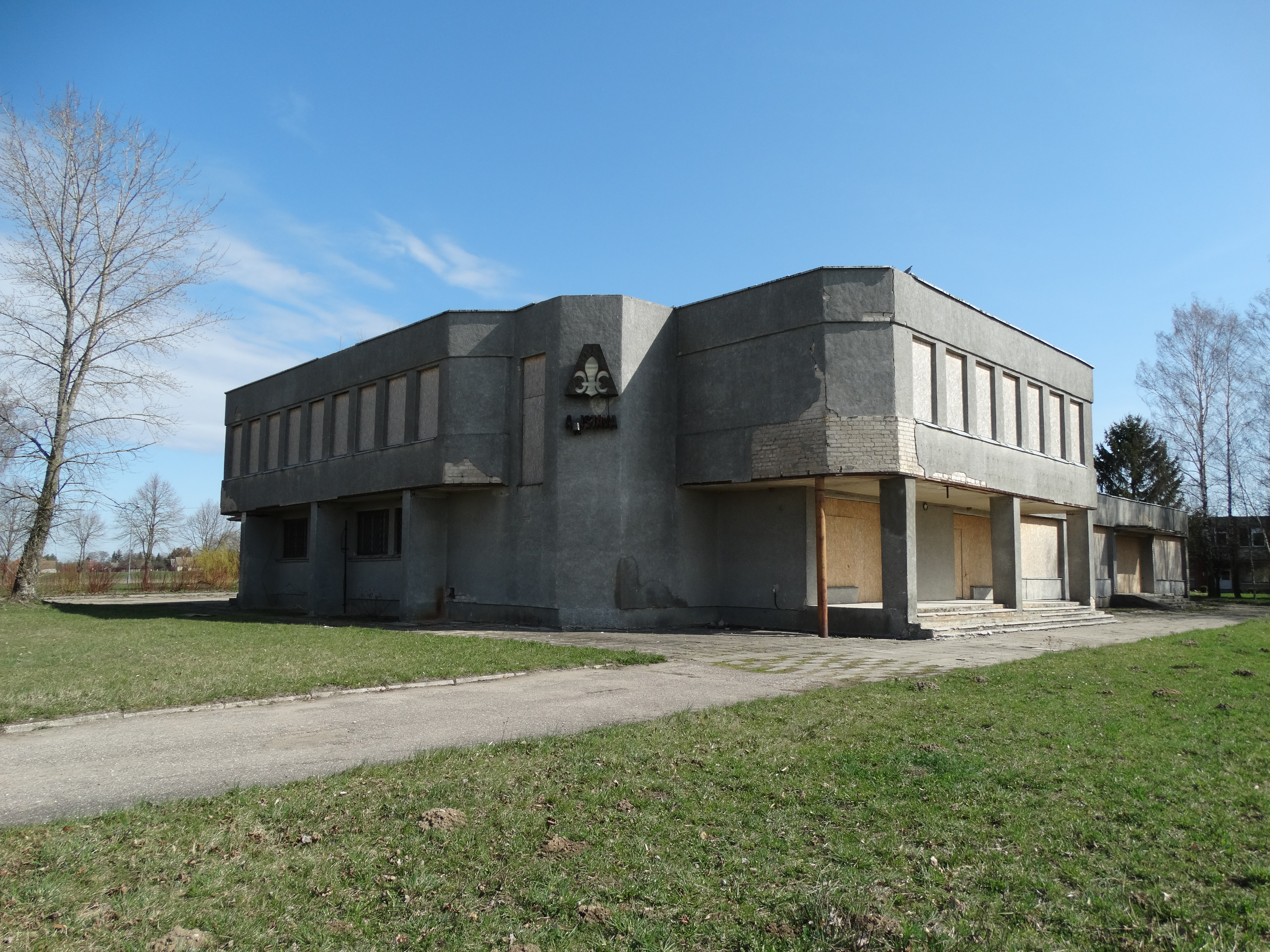
Former culture house

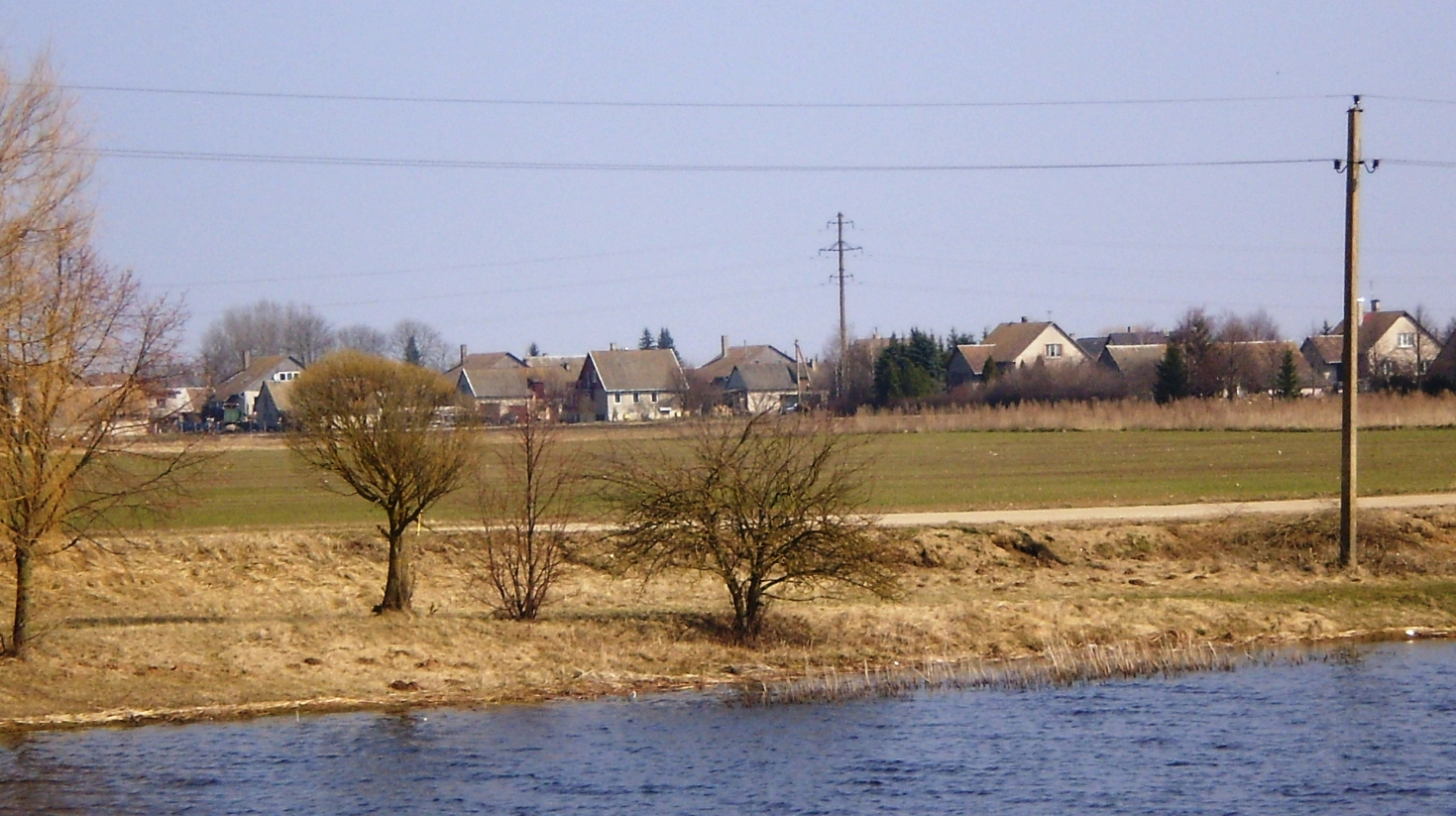
Aristava from the shore of the Bubliai Reservoir

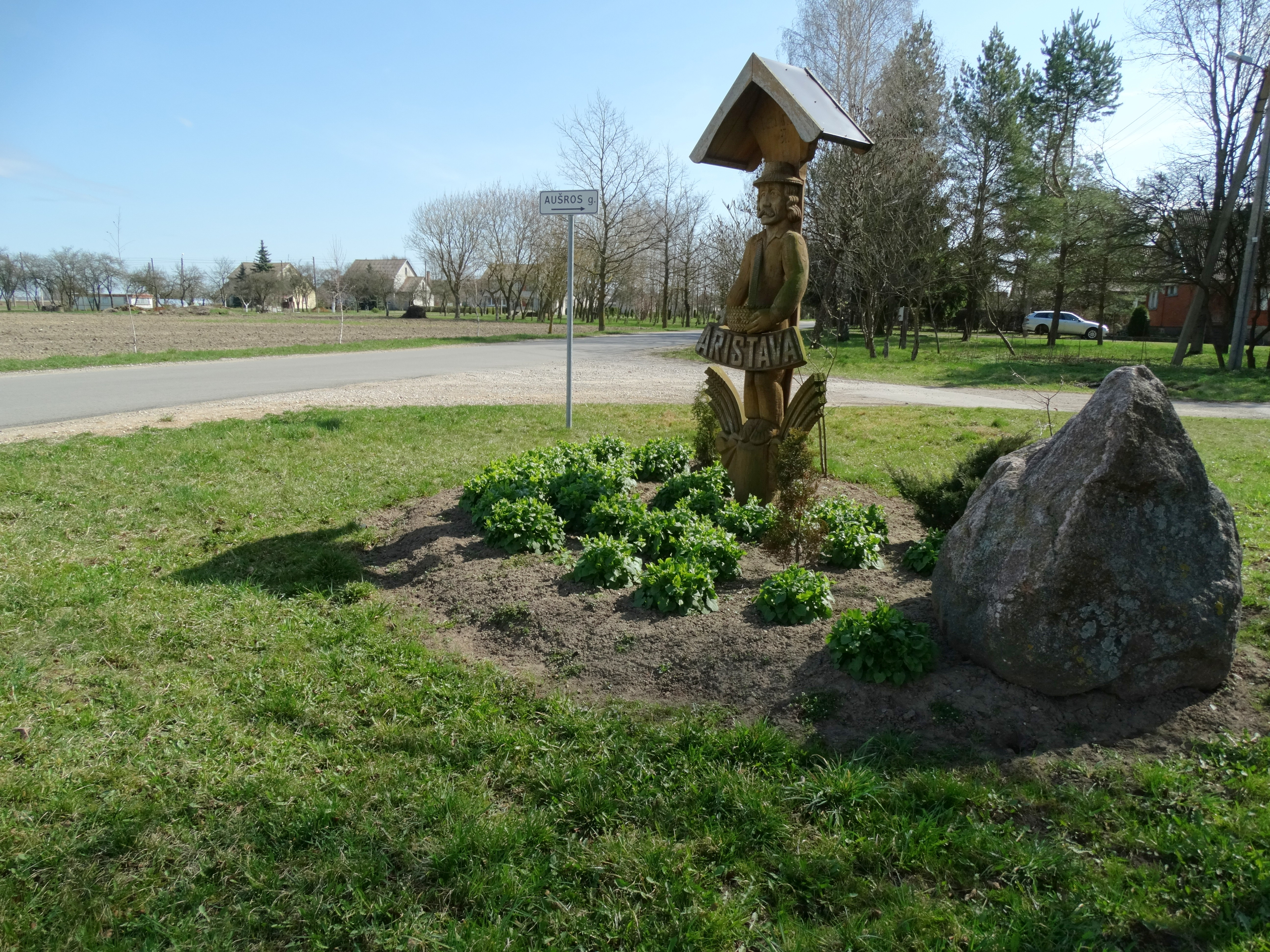
Aristava sign
