= Vainiūnai, Kėdainiai =

Vainiūnai
- Village
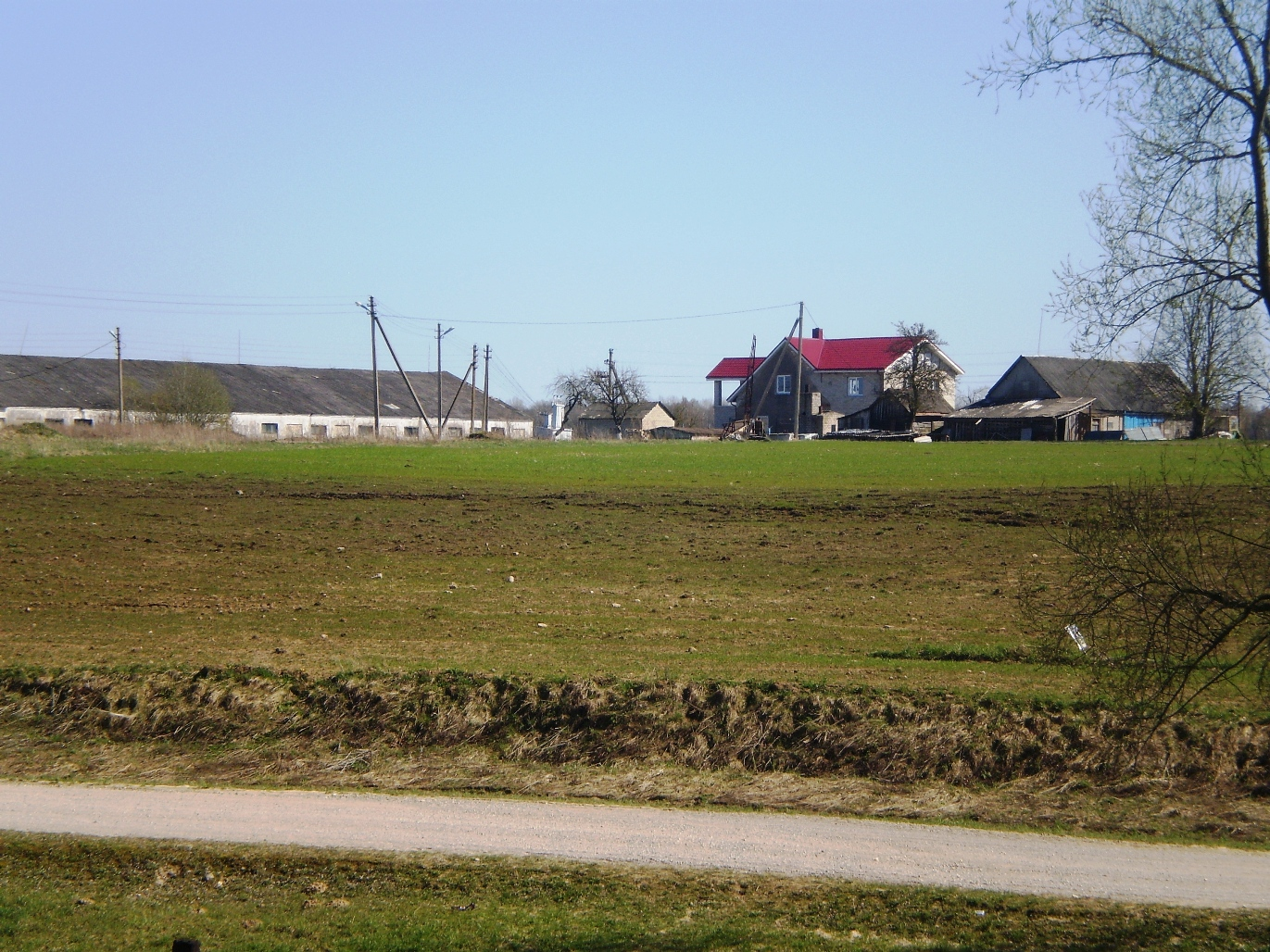

- Location in Lithuania Vainiūnai (Lithuania)
- Coordinates: 55°15′29″N 24°10′08″E
- Country: Lithuania
- County: Kaunas County
- Municipality: Kėdainiai district municipality
- Eldership: Pelėdnagiai Eldership

Population (2011)
  - Total: 14
- Time zone: UTC+2 (EET)
  - Summer (DST): UTC+3 (EEST)

Vainiūnai (formerly Russian: Войнюны) is a village in Kėdainiai district municipality, in Kaunas County, in central Lithuania. According to the 2011 census, the village had a population of 14 people. It is located 4.5 kilometres (2.8 mi) from Beinaičiai, by the Lankesa river and the Bubliai Reservoir. The road Šėta-Nociūnai runs nearby. There is a water tower and a farm.

== Demography ==
Historical population

Year	Pop.	±% p.a.
1902	51	—
1923	59	+0.70%
1959	43	−0.87%
1970	50	+1.38%

Year	Pop.	±% p.a.
1979	27	−6.62%
1989	22	−2.03%
2001	23	+0.37%
2011	14	−4.84%

Source: 1902, 1923, 1959 & 1970, 1979, 1989, 2001, 2011

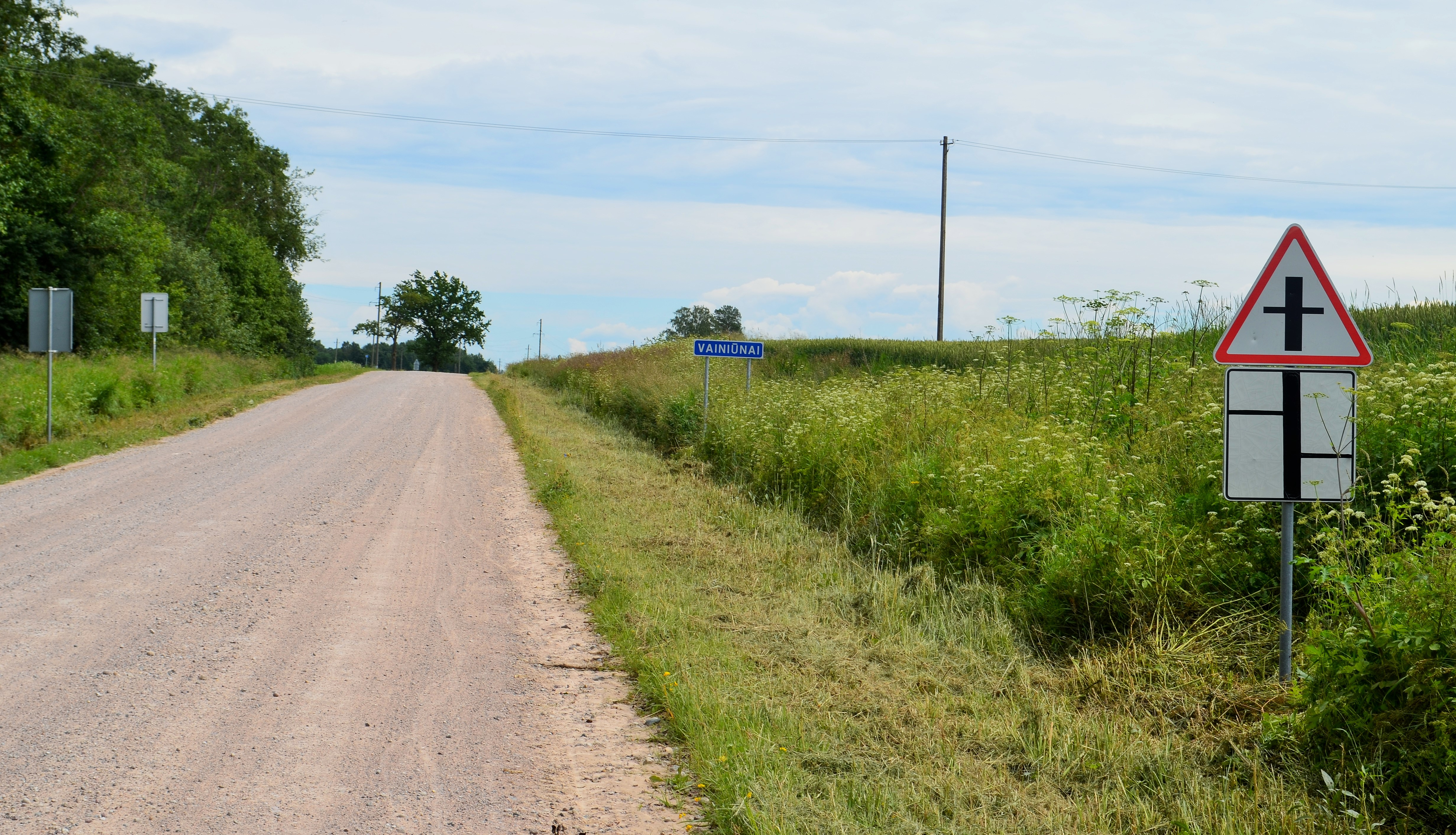
Vainiūnai road sign
