= Stašaičiai =

- Village
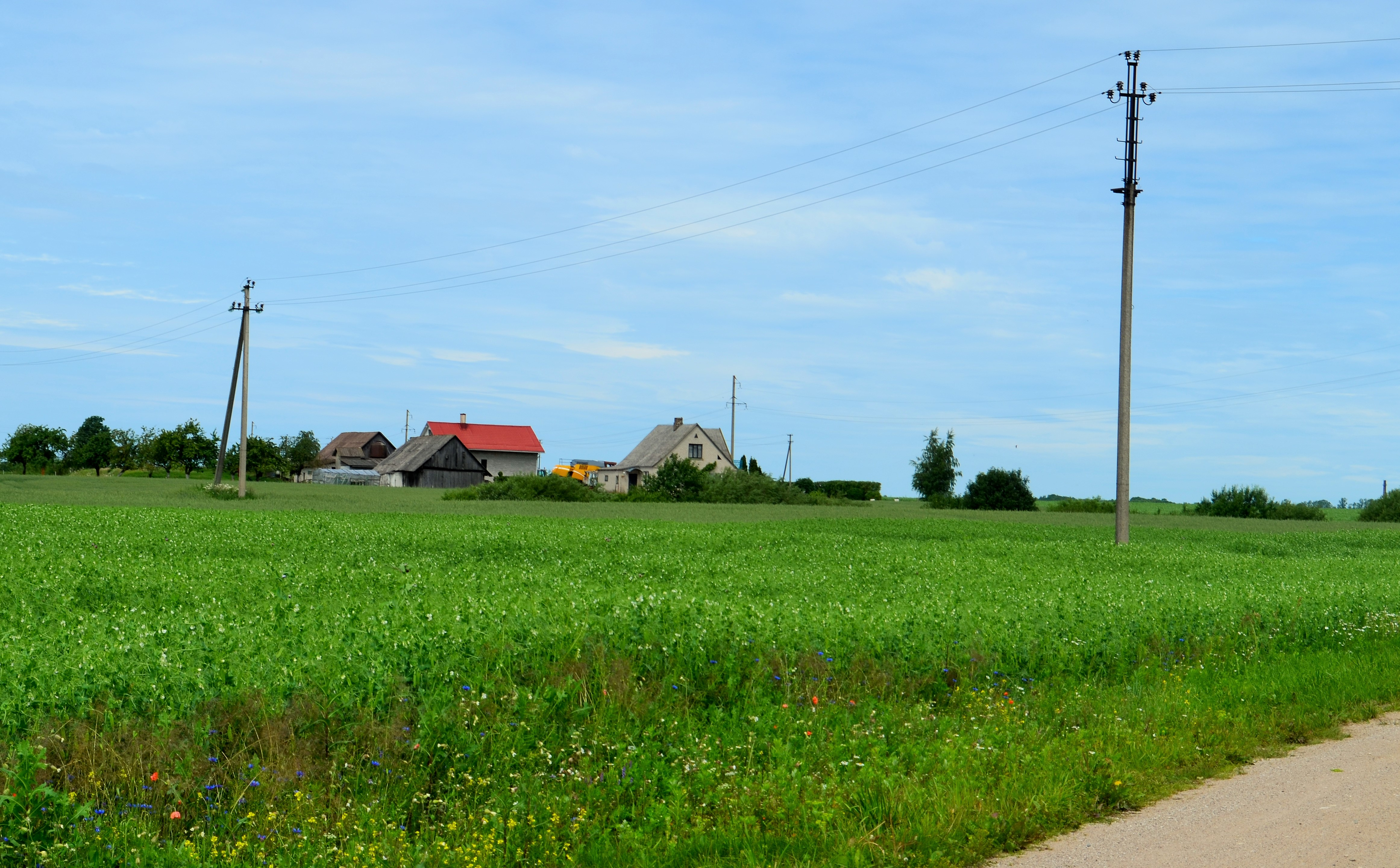

- Location in Lithuania Stašaičiai (Lithuania)
- Coordinates: 55°15′50″N 24°10′01″E
- Country: Lithuania
- County: Kaunas County
- Municipality: Kėdainiai district municipality
- Eldership: Pelėdnagiai Eldership

Population (2011)
  - Total: 11
- Time zone: UTC+2 (EET)
  - Summer (DST): UTC+3 (EEST)

Stašaičiai (formerly Russian: Сташайце, Polish: Staszajcie) is a village in Kėdainiai district municipality, in Kaunas County, in central Lithuania. According to the 2011 census, the village had a population of 11 people. It is located 3 kilometres (1.9 mi) from Aukštieji Kapliai, alongside the Nociūnai-Šėta road, by the confluence of the Obelis (now as the Bubliai Reservoir) and the Lankesa rivers. The Stašaičiai hillfort is located in the village.

== Demography ==
Historical population

Year	Pop.	±% p.a.
1902	85	—
1923	102	+0.87%
1959	71	−1.00%
1970	55	−2.29%

Year	Pop.	±% p.a.
1979	17	−12.23%
1989	18	+0.57%
2001	15	−1.51%
2011	11	−3.05%

Source: 1902, 1923, 1959 & 1970, 1979, 1989, 2001, 2011

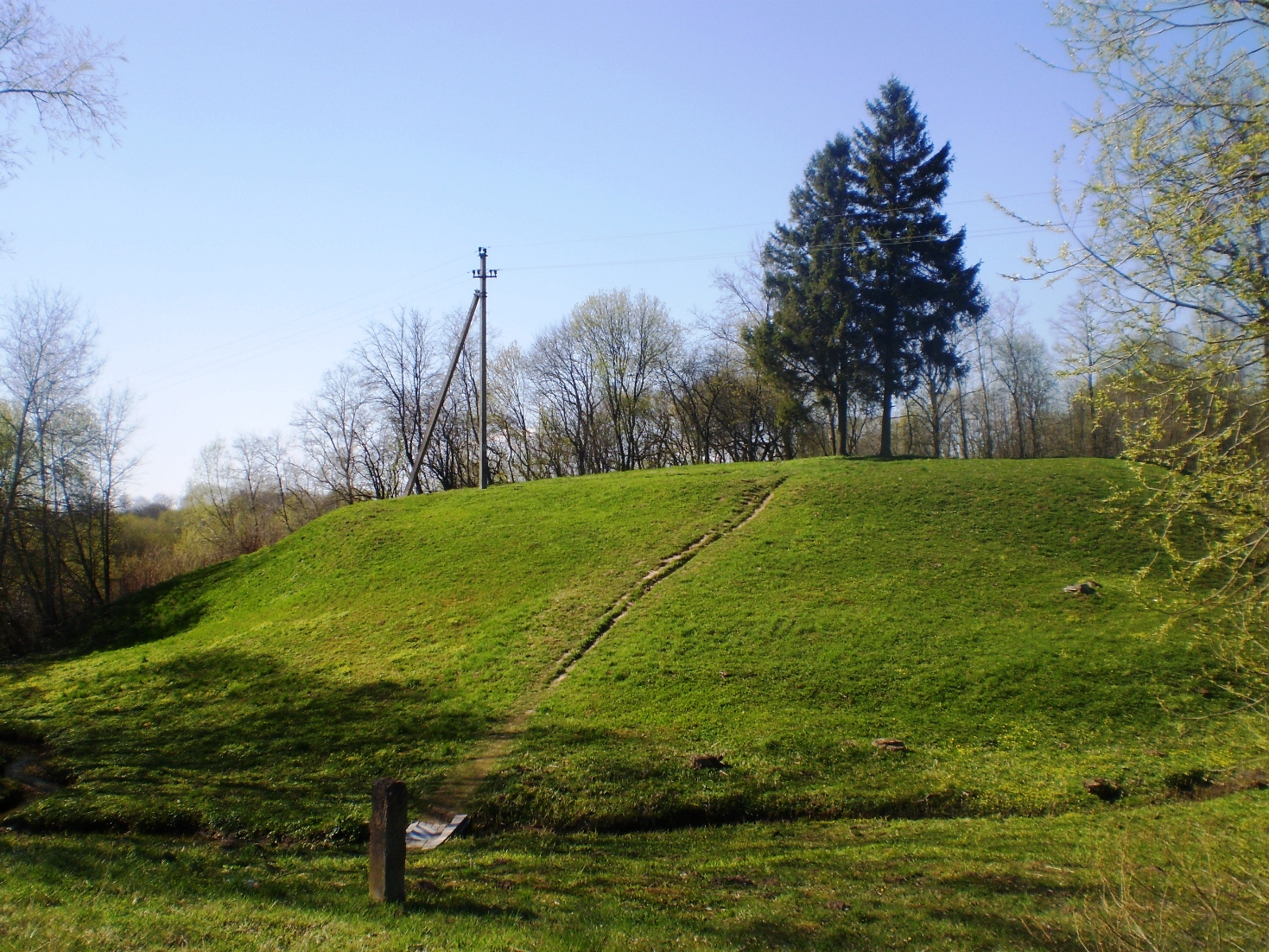
Stašaičiai hillfort
