= Polius =

Polius is a surname. Notable people with the surname include:

- Angelina Phera Polius, Saint Lucian politician
- Bruno Polius (born 1958), French singer
- Dalton Polius, (born 1990), Saint Lucian cricketer
- Rupert Polius (born 1944), Saint Lucian cricketer

== See also ==
- Pocius
