= Izidorius Pocius =

- Born: c. 1865 near Eržvilkas, Russian Empire
- Died: c. 1935 near Eržvilkas, Republic of Lithuania
- Occupation(s): vendor (publicly) book-carrier (clandestine)
- Spouse: not married
- Parent(s): Antanas Pocius and Veronika Povilaitytė

Izidorius Pocius (born c. 1865, Erzhvilkovskaya volost, Russian Empire – died c. 1935 near Eržvilkas; also known by his pseudonym Juzis) was a Lithuanian vendor and a book smuggler (knygnešys), mostly operating inside what is now Tauragė District and surrounding areas.

Izidorius Pocius was born into a poor peasants' family. His father was a village musician who would travel from one village to another. Izidorius spent most of his childhood in the village of Pagiriai (current Jurbarkas District Municipality), where the family finally moved and settled in the early 1870s. Izidorius's mother died while giving birth, when Izidorius was still small. All the younger brothers and sisters of Izidorius died in their childhood, already before the death of their mother. Izidorius's father, a widower, got married for the second time and had more children. Izidorius grew up with his father, step-mother and half-brothers and sisters.

Izidorius joined the Lithuanian book smugglers movement presumably after reaching adulthood. He collaborated with many book smugglers from Rossiyensky Uyezd, such as Jonas Švedas, Viktoras Alijošius, and Juozas Sakalauskas, among others. He helped Rev. Julijonas Jasienskis, the chief editor of the newspaper Cross (Kryžius) and a chaplain serving in Palanga Progymnasium, to deliver the manuscripts to the printing houses in Lithuania Minor. He also distributed other illegal books brought by the other book smugglers, bringing considerable amounts of literature from Lithuania Minor himself. He would then bind the books and distribute them inside Rossiyensky Uyezd.

After having become a skilled book smuggler he passed on his experience to the younger book smugglers. It is documented that Izidorius Pocius introduced Jonas Pakatinskas-Katiliukas, who later became a famous book smuggler, and his brother Kazimiras to the activities by taking them along to Tilsit in 1892.

In 1893, forty-six Lithuanian books were confiscated by the police in Panevėžys from Izidorius, while he was penalised with one month's confinement in police custody for a month on the orders of the governor-general of the Vilna Governorate. Five years later he was caught again, this time carrying nine books in Šiauliai and put in police custody for one month again in December 1898. He was arrested again in 1900 in Truskava. He was beaten by the police on the way from one confinement place to another. Izidorius consequently fell ill as a result of the beatings and poor conditions during the confinement and lost his sanity. He would reportedly spend the rest of his life wandering around, always carrying a leather basket used for transporting smuggled books on his shoulders and holding an eight-edged gnarled stick. Starting from 1928, he would receive a pension of 50 litas a month, designated for former Lithuanian book smugglers, but he would constantly run out of money, according to his contemporaries.

Izidorius passed away around 1935, presumably in Erzhvilkovskaya volost, Lithuania, even though the exact place and date are unknown.

His nephew Antanas Pocius was a Lithuanian organist and composer.
