= Šėta Eldership =

Šėta Eldership Šėtos seniūnija
- Eldership
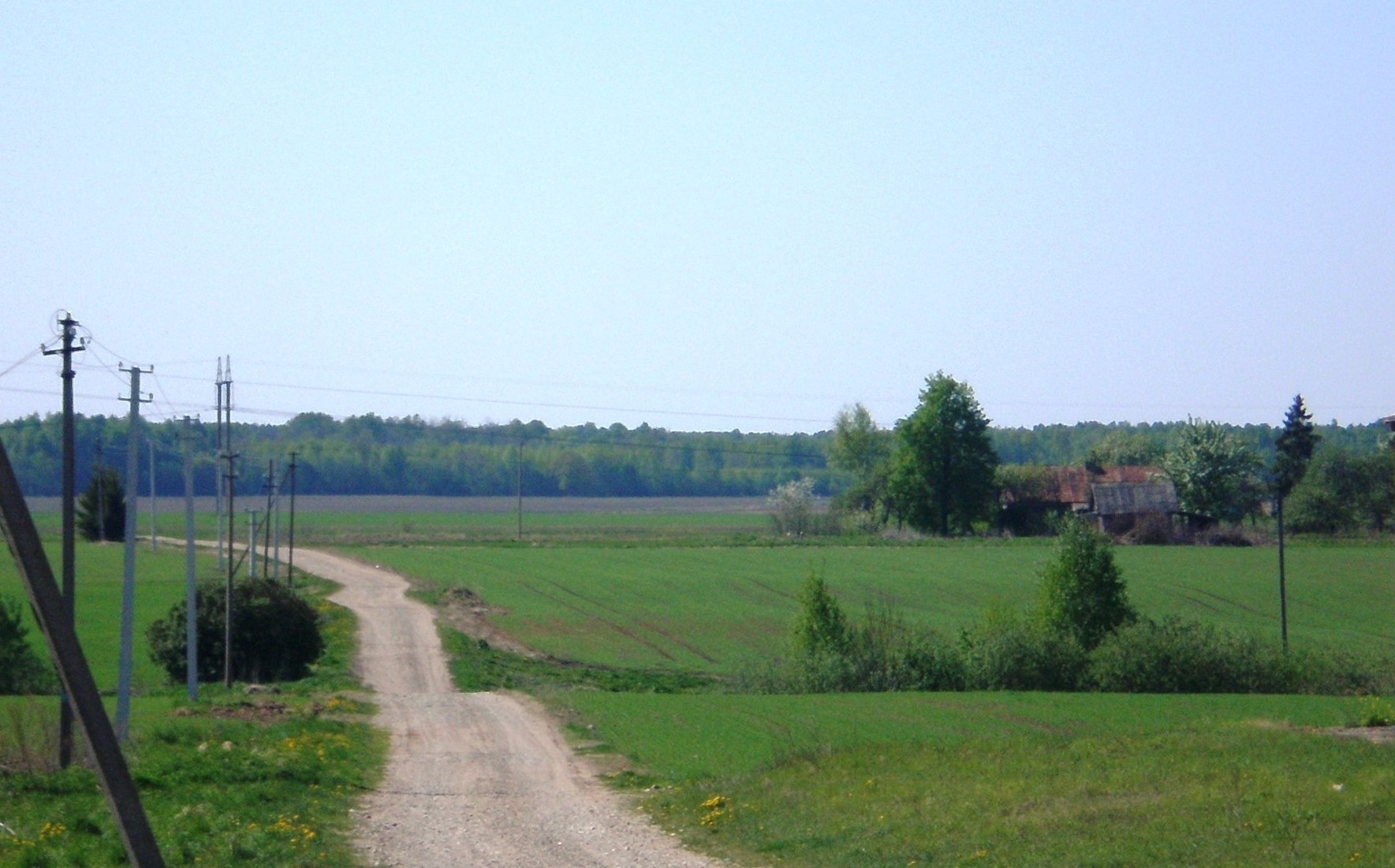
- Petraičiai village surroundings

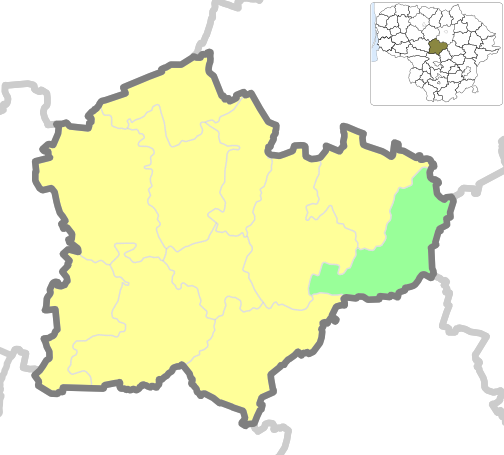
- Location of Vilainiai Eldership
- Country: Lithuania
- Ethnographic region: Aukštaitija
- County: Kaunas County
- Municipality: Kėdainiai District Municipality
- Administrative centre: Šėta

Area
  - Total: 130 km^{2} (50 sq mi)

Population (2011)
  - Total: 2,103
  - Density: 16/km^{2} (42/sq mi)
- Time zone: UTC+2 (EET)
  - Summer (DST): UTC+3 (EEST)

Šėta Eldership (Lithuanian: Šėtos seniūnija) is a Lithuanian eldership, located in the eastern part of Kėdainiai District Municipality.

== Geography ==
The territory of Šėta Eldership is located mostly in the Nevėžis Plain. Relief is mostly flat, cultivated as agriculture lands.

- Rivers: Obelis, Šumera, Rudekšna, Suleva, Indija, Arvystas.
- Lakes and ponds: Sangailis Lake, Bubliai Reservoir, Kapliai Reservoir, Šėta Reservoir.
- Forests: Pauslajys Forest, Siesikai Forest, Lančiūnava-Šventybrastis Forest.
- Protected areas: Šėta Botanical Sanctuary, Ilgatrakis Forest Botanical-Zoological Sanctuary, Runeikiai Forest Telmological Sanctuary.

== Places of interest ==
- Catholic churches in Šėta and Pagiriai
- Catholic chapels in Šėta and Pagiriai cemeteries
- Manors sites in Pašumerys and Vaiškoniai
- Sangailai and Stašaičiai hillforts
- Former watermill in Pakščiai
- Pašėtė burial site and shrine
- Soviet mosaic the "Man and Technics" in Aukštieji Kapliai

== Populated places ==
Following settlements are located in the Šėta Eldership (as for the 2011 census):

- Towns: Pagiriai · Šėta
- Villages: Aleksandriškis · Aukštieji Kapliai · Bebrikiai · Bladikiai · Čereliai · Dargužiai · Glaušiai · Griniškiai · Gumbiai · Jaskaičiai · Jokniai · Jovaišai · Kamėnai · Kezai · Kreiviai · Kuronys · Liliūnai · Lioliai · Lyviškiai · Margiai · Mauliai · Mitėniškiai · Norbutiškiai · Pagiriai· Paguiriai · Pakščiai · Papurviai · Pašėtė · Pašumeris · Petraičiai · Plankiai · Pručiai · Rikliškiai · Runeikiai · Sangailai · Simanonys · Stageliai · Stagiai · Steponava · Trakučiai · Vaiškoniai · Valakai · Vidnapolis · Vivonys · Zapranai · Žeguniai · Žeimeliai · Žemieji Kapliai · Žilionys
- Hamlets: Bernotiškis ·Bugumilava · Čeponiškiai · Daratava · Joniškiai · Kirdeikiai · Linksmavietė · Morkūnai · Ožiškiai · Sokai
- Former settlements: Pakšteliai · Pramislava
