= Lankesa =

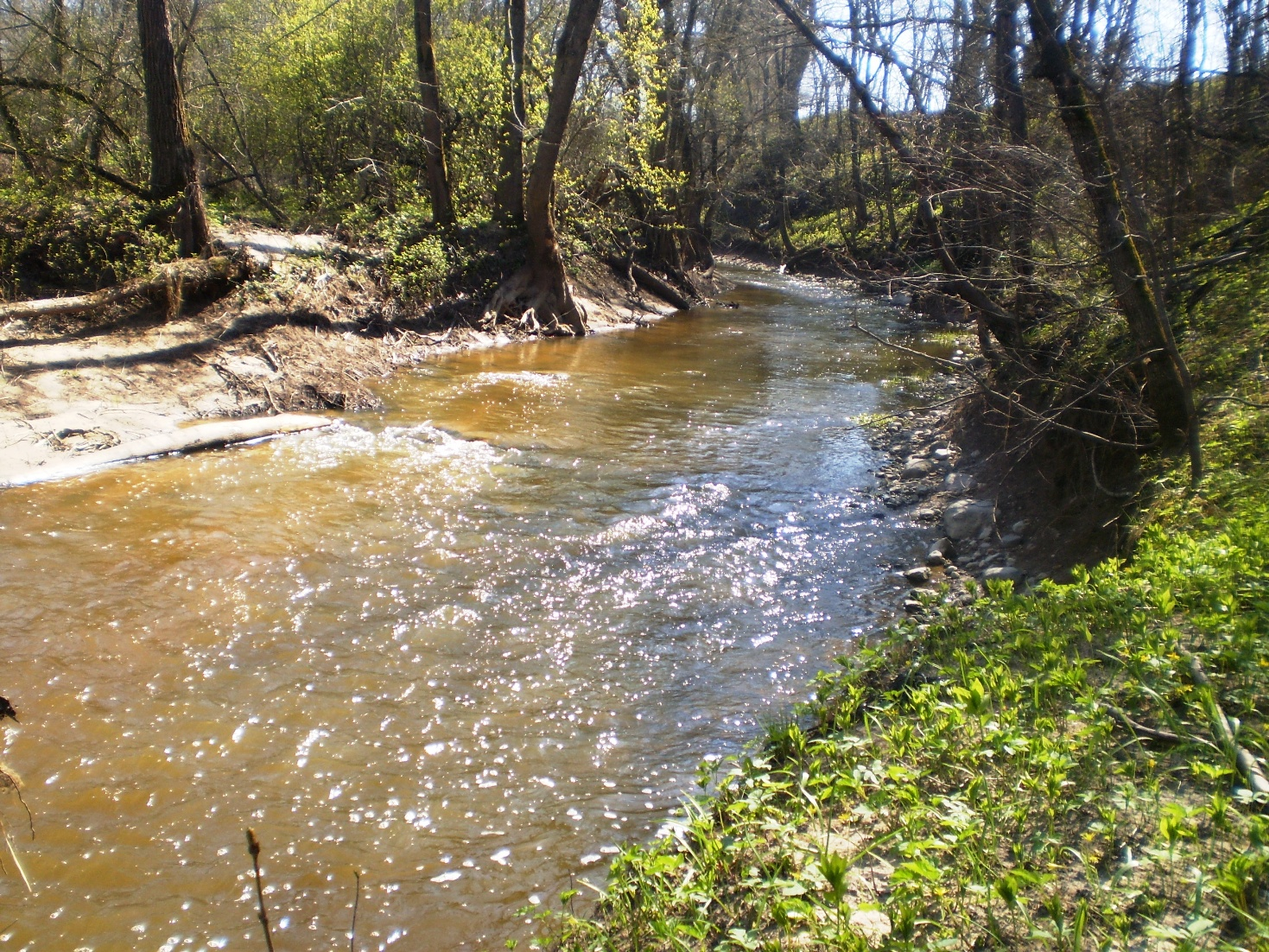
- Lankesa nearby Užkapiai village

Location
- Country: Lithuania
- Region: Vilnius County, Kaunas County

Physical characteristics
- Source
  - location: Reniūnai, Ukmergė District Municipality
- Mouth: Obelis in Valkaičiai
  - coordinates: 55.2697°N 24.1348°E
- Length: 54 km (34 mi)
- Basin size: 245 km^{2} (95 sq mi)
- Discharge
  - average: 1.23 m³/s

Basin features
- Progression: Obelis→ Nevėžis→ Neman→ Baltic Sea
- Tributaries
  - left: Srautas, Petrašiunka, Juodynė, Medukšna
  - right: Garanklė, Gramas

The Lankesa is a river in central Lithuania. It flows for 54 kilometres (34 mi) and has a basin area of 245 km^{2} (95 sq mi). It is a left tributary of the Obelis.

It begins nearby Reniūnai village in Ukmergė District Municipality, then flows to the south west through Jonava District Municipality. After a confluence with the Medukšna it turns to the north west and runs through Kėdainiai District Municipality till it meets the Obelis in Valkaičiai.

After bigger rains it often overflows own course. It often dries out during summers and freezes up to the bottom during winters.

Gaižūnai, Pasraučiai, Martyniškis, Žeimių GS, Palankesiai, Žeimiai, Užkapiai, Vainiūnai, Stašaičiai settlements are located on the banks of the Lankesa. At its confluence with the Obelis the Stašaičiai hillfort stands.

The hydronym Lankesa derives either from Lithuanian word lanka ('flood-meadow'), or from lankas, lankstas ('bend, crook').
