= Pocius =

Pocius is the masculine form of a Lithuanian family name. Its feminine forms are: Pocienė or Pociuvienė (married woman or widow) and Pociūtė (unmarried woman).

The surname may refer to:

- Algirdas Pocius (1930–2021), Lithuanian politician and writer
- Antanas Pocius (1913–1983), Lithuanian choirmaster, organist and composer
- Arvydas Pocius (born 1957), Lithuanian army officer and former chief of Defense
- Izidorius Pocius (1865–1935), Lithuanian book smuggler
- Martynas Pocius (born 1986), Lithuanian basketball player
- Remigijus Pocius (born 1968), Lithuanian football player.
