= Truskava Eldership =

Truskava Eldership Truskavos seniūnija
- Eldership
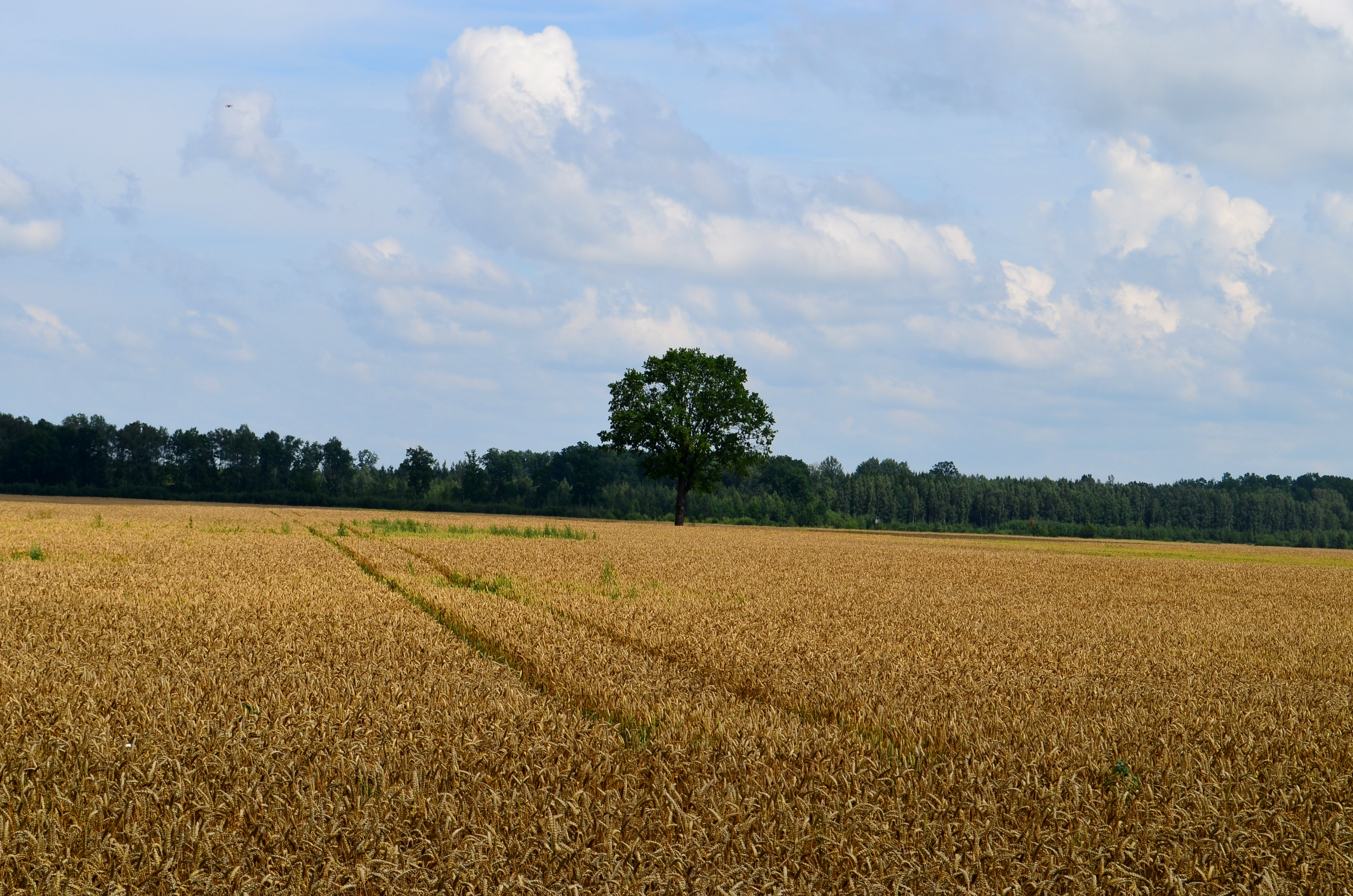
- Fields of former Lasongalis village

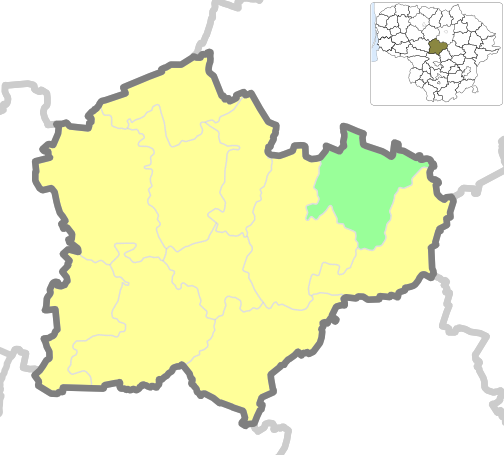
- Location of Truskava Eldership
- Country: Lithuania
- Ethnographic region: Aukštaitija
- County: Kaunas County
- Municipality: Kėdainiai District Municipality
- Administrative centre: Truskava

Area
  - Total: 120 km^{2} (46 sq mi)

Population (2011)
  - Total: 1,305
  - Density: 11/km^{2} (28/sq mi)
- Time zone: UTC+2 (EET)
  - Summer (DST): UTC+3 (EEST)

Truskava Eldership (Lithuanian: Truskavos seniūnija) is a Lithuanian eldership, located in the north eastern part of Kėdainiai District Municipality.

== Geography ==
The territory of Truskava Eldership is located mostly in the Nevėžis Plain. Relief is mostly flat, cultivated as agriculture lands.

- Rivers: Linkava, Žiežmojus.
- Lakes and ponds: Paežeriai Lake.
- Marches: Laukagalis March
- Forests: Pauslajys Forest, Lančiūnava-Šventybrastis Forest.
- Protected areas: Gaisai Botanical Zoological Sanctuary, Dovydai Forest Botanical Sanctuary, Pašilėliai Botanical Zoological Sanctuary, Skaistė Ornitological Sanctuary.

== Places of interest ==
- Church of the Holy Spirit of Truskava
- Church of St. Apostle Evangelist Matthew of Anciškis
- Pavermenys Manor
- Pauslajys manor site
- Šukioniai hillfort

== Populated places ==
Following settlements are located in the Truskava Eldership (as for the 2011 census):

- Towns: Truskava
- Villages: Anciškis · Bajoriškiai · Daugėliškis · Dvariškiai I · Dvariškiai II · Gaisai · Gerdvilai · Kievagalis · Kušleikiškis · Lalai · Lasongalis · Laukagalis · Likėnai · Naujasodė · Okainėliai · Okainiai · Osinauka · Oželiai · Padėgiai · Padvarninkai · Paežeriai · Pagilupys · Pašilėliai · Pauslajys · Pavermenys · Petkūnai · Piktagalis · Pročiūnai · Ramygolka · Ratlankstis · Rekšiai · Suradgalis · Ščiukiškis · Šnipiškis · Šukioniai · Taujankai · Taujėnai · Trakai · Užvalkiai · Užvermenė · Užžartėlė · Vaidilai · Vidulaukiai · Volungiškiai
