= Beinaičiai =

- Village
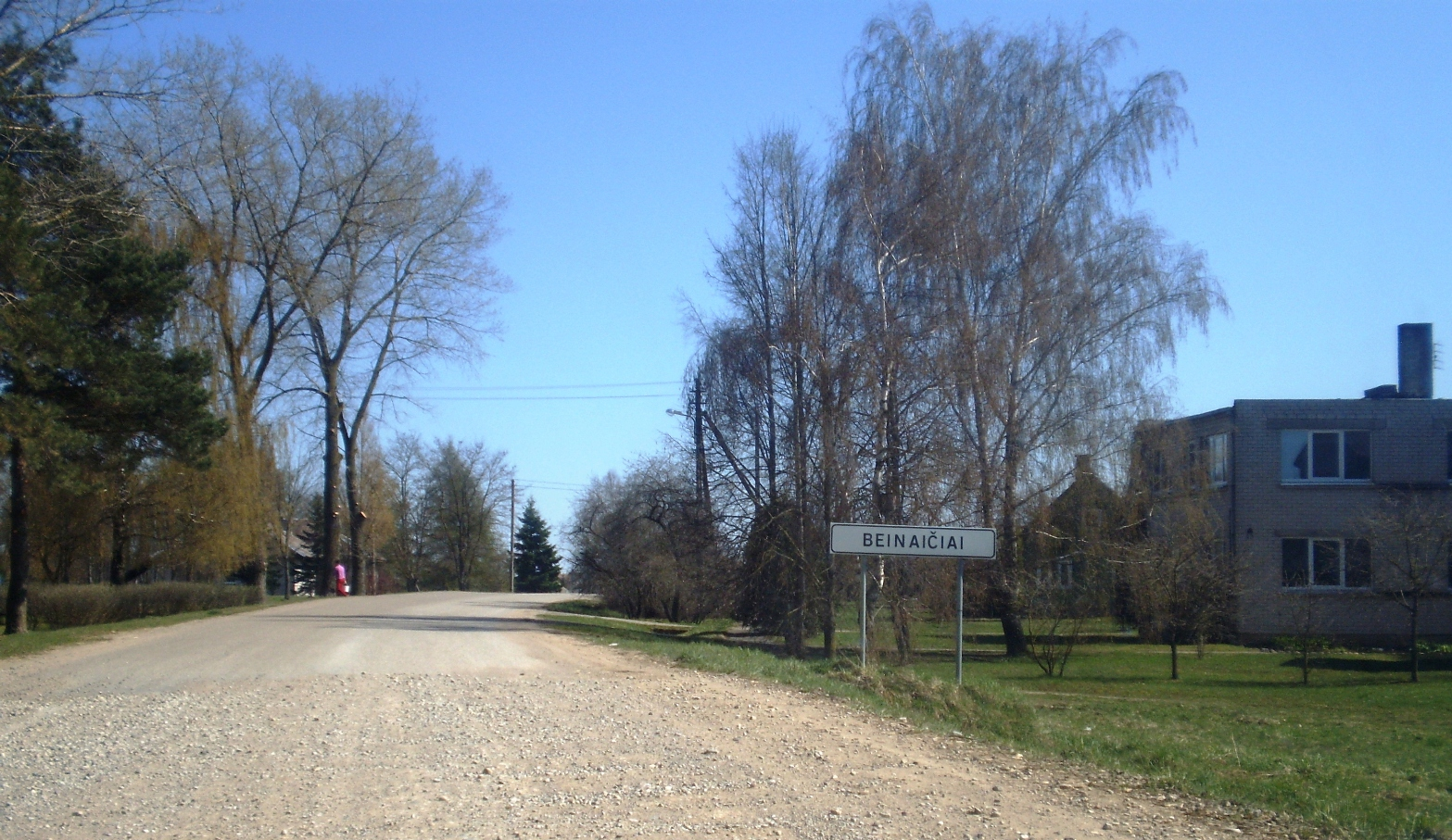

- Location in Lithuania Beinaičiai (Lithuania)
- Coordinates: 55°13′59″N 24°06′40″E
- Country: Lithuania
- County: Kaunas County
- Municipality: Kėdainiai district municipality
- Eldership: Pelėdnagiai Eldership

Population (2011)
  - Total: 267
- Time zone: UTC+2 (EET)
  - Summer (DST): UTC+3 (EEST)

Beinaičiai (formerly Russian: Бейнайце, Polish: Benajcie, Bejnajcie) is a village in Kėdainiai district municipality, in Kaunas County, in central Lithuania. According to the 2011 census, the village had a population of 267 people. It is located 11 kilometres (6.8 mi) from Kėdainiai, by the Šėta-Nociūnai road. There is a library and a former school.

== History ==
Beinaičiai village and folwark existed at the beginning of the 20th century.

During the Soviet times, Beinaičiai was a kolkhoz center.

== Demography ==
Historical population

| Year | Pop. | ±% p.a. |
|---|---|---|
| 1902 | 207 | — |
| 1923 | 172 | −0.88% |
| 1959 | 133 | −0.71% |
| 1970 | 128 | −0.35% |
| 1979 | 169 | +3.14% |

| Year | Pop. | ±% p.a. |
|---|---|---|
| 1984 | 173 | +0.47% |
| 1989 | 330 | +13.79% |
| 2001 | 325 | −0.13% |
| 2011 | 267 | −1.95% |

Source: 1902, 1923, 1959 & 1970, 1979, 1989, 2001, 2011
