= Valkaičiai =

- Village
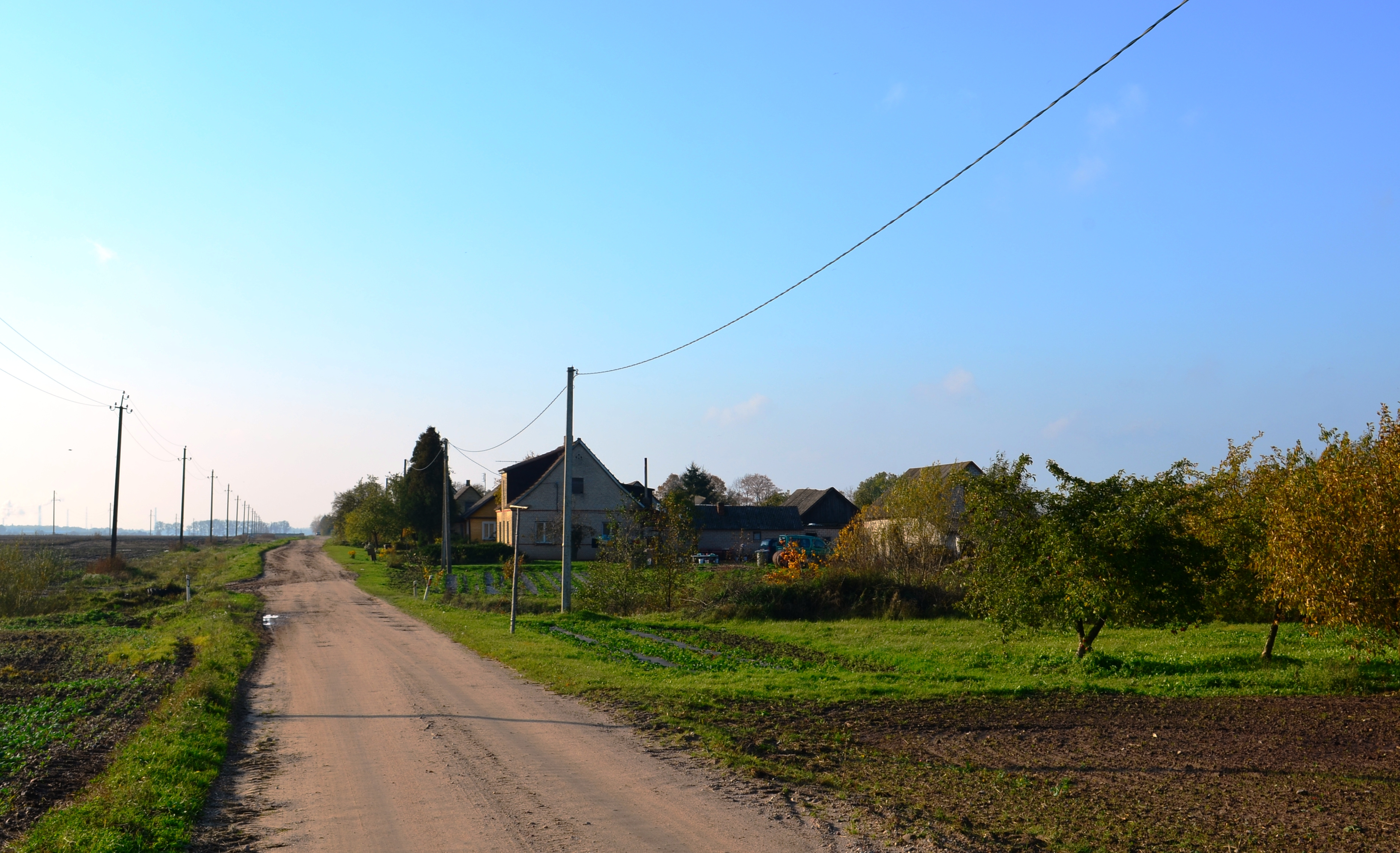

- Location in Lithuania Valkaičiai (Lithuania)
- Coordinates: 55°16′08″N 24°07′19″E
- Country: Lithuania
- County: Kaunas County
- Municipality: Kėdainiai district municipality
- Eldership: Vilainiai Eldership

Population (2011)
  - Total: 6
- Time zone: UTC+2 (EET)
  - Summer (DST): UTC+3 (EEST)

Valkaičiai (formerly Russian: Волкайце, Polish: Wołkajcie) is a village in Kėdainiai district municipality, in Kaunas County, in central Lithuania. According to the 2011 census, the village had a population of 6 people. It is located 3 kilometres (1.9 mi) from Aristava, on the shore of the Bubliai Reservoir.

Formerly it was a manor of the Strebeikai family. There was beer and spirit distilleries, a water mill.

== Demography ==
Historical population

Year	Pop.	±% p.a.
1902	35	—
1923	42	+0.87%
1959	47	+0.31%
1970	48	+0.19%

Year	Pop.	±% p.a.
1979	36	−3.15%
1989	10	−12.02%
2001	12	+1.53%
2011	6	−6.70%

Source: 1902, 1923, 1959 & 1970, 1979, 1989, 2001, 2011
