= Pagiriai =

- Town
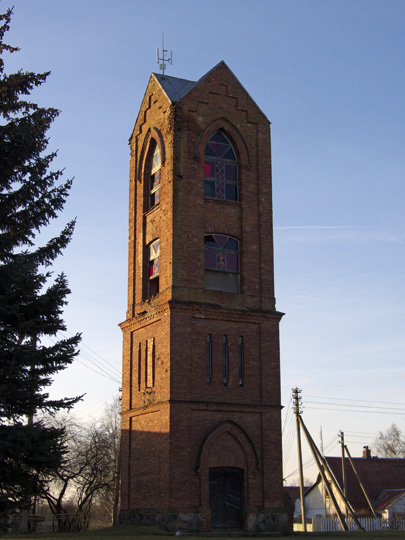
- Pagiriai tower

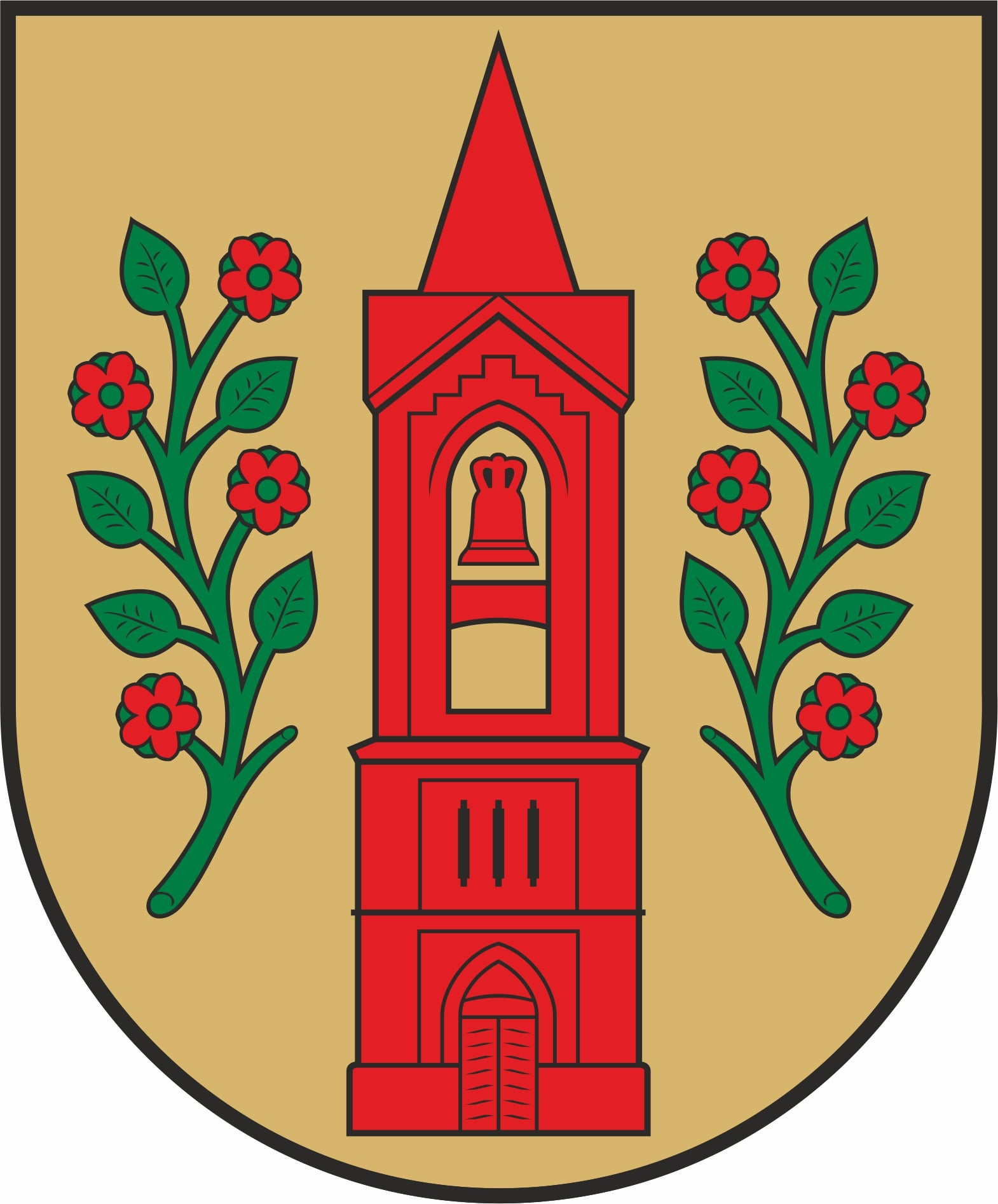
- Coat of arms

- Location in Lithuania
- Coordinates: 55°21′40″N 24°24′0″E
- Country: Lithuania
- Ethnographic region: Aukštaitija
- County: Kaunas County

Population (2011)
  - Total: 358
- Time zone: UTC+2 (EET)
  - Summer (DST): UTC+3 (EEST)

Pagiriai is a small town in northeast Kėdainiai district municipality, Kaunas County in central Lithuania. It is east of Kėdainiai and 18 km southeast of Ramygala. It forms the Pagiriai Eldership (seniūnaitija).

Since 1944, the town has housed the wooden Church of the Visitation of the Blessed Virgin Mary, and the Pagiriai Chapel in its cemetery. Local facilities include a medical station, the Pagiriai Adomas Jakštas multifunctional center of Šėta Gymnasium, a library, community center, and a post office (LT-58072).

Local industry includes wood processing ("Sagmeda" and "Dagmedis") and a bakery. A former horticultural center exists in the area, thought its orchards are now abandoned. There is also a monument dedicated to deportees and partisans (1990).

The town is surrounded by Pagiriai village, and the Rudekšna River flows through it. Roads connect Pagiriai to Šėta, Velžys, Ukmergė, and Vaiškoniai.

== Etymology ==
The place's name translates to "a settlement by the forrest" or "forest-side area".

== History ==
About 2 km southeast of Pagiriai, the Aneliava Treasure was discovered in 1908. It consisted of 13th-century silver ingots and bronze ornaments.

The Pagiriai Manor and village are mentioned at the end of the 16th century. The first church was built in 1626 by three brothers: Gabrielius, Kristupas, and Karolis Bialozarai. It was burned down during the Great Northern War. In 1742, the church was rebuilt through the efforts of priest Penkaševskis, and again reconstructed in 1876 by priest Šimkevičius. During World War II, in the summer of 1944, the church burned down once more; a temporary church was set up in the parish hall.

During the Great Northern War, the village was heavily destroyed. In 1750, it was granted the right to hold a weekly market, and from 1777 a parish school was established here. In the 19th century, Pagiriai was a small town and the administrative center of a rural district (volost) in the Ukmergė County.

In 1909, the first cooperative dairy in Lithuania was established here. The town was notable for the large number of Lithuanian Army founders and volunteers. On 23 April 1919, a partisan detachment of 30 men joined the Lithuanian Armed Forces.

In the interwar period, the settlement was referred to as Pagirys. A school was established in 1908 by Saulė Society, and from 1908 to 1914, a branch of the Lithuanian Catholic Temperance Society operated there. Pagiriai had a cooperative, a small credit bank, and a motorized mill. In 1944, the town was burned down again. On 9 September 1944, Lithuanian partisans killed a group of Soviet officials on the road from Pagiriai to Ukmergė.

During the Soviet period, Pagiriai prospered as the settlement of a state horticultural farm (sodininkystės tarybinis ūkis). In 2021, Pagiriai's coat of arms was officially approved.

== Demographics ==
In 2011 it had a population of 358.
