= Vilainiai =

- Village
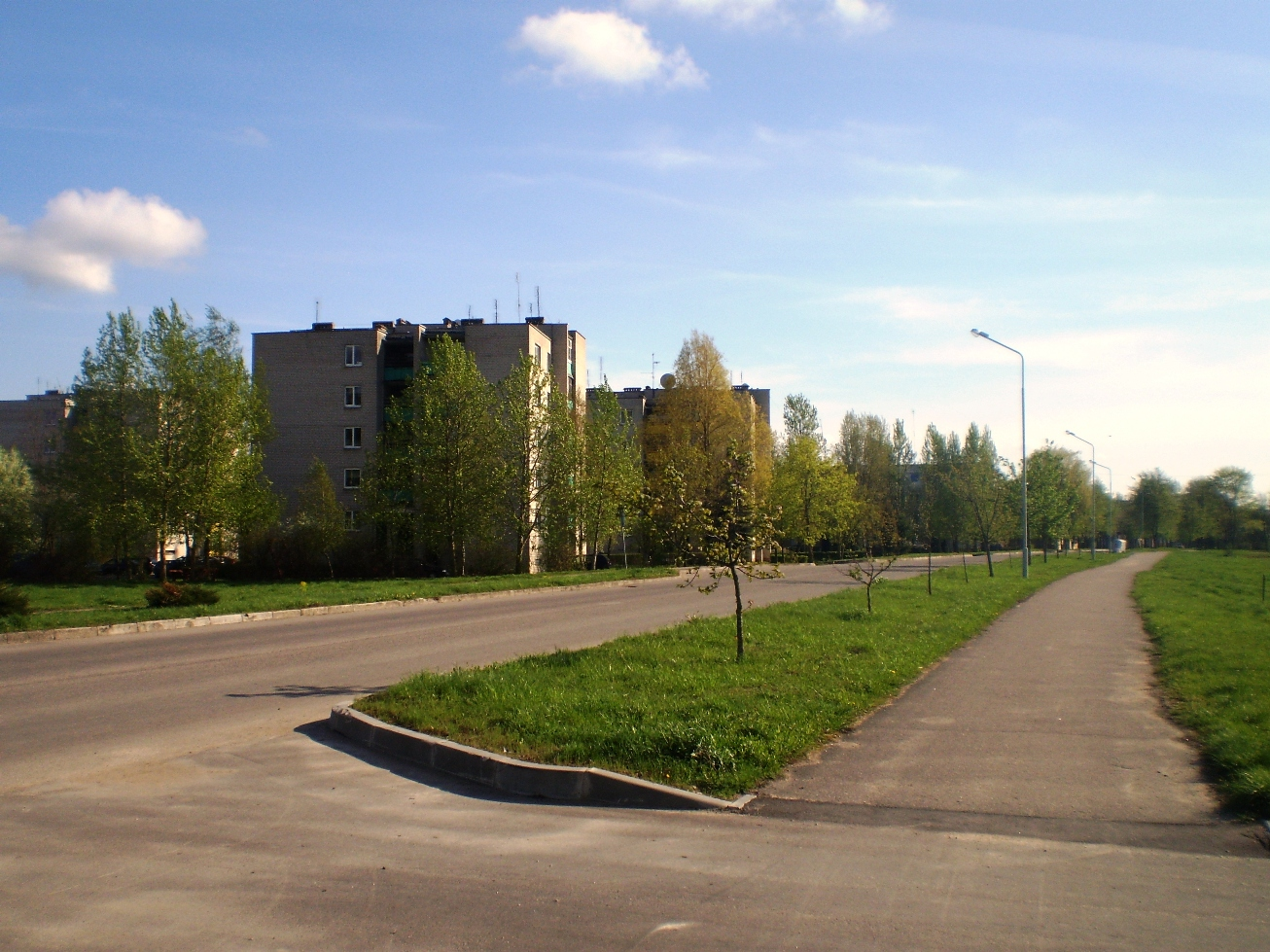

- Location in Lithuania Vilainiai (Lithuania)
- Coordinates: 55°18′00″N 24°00′11″E
- Country: Lithuania
- County: Kaunas County
- Municipality: Kėdainiai district municipality
- Eldership: Vilainiai Eldership
- Capital of: Vilainiai Eldership

Population (2021)
  - Total: 1,157
- Time zone: UTC+2 (EET)
  - Summer (DST): UTC+3 (EEST)

Vilainiai (formerly Russian: Вилайни, Polish: Wiłajnie) is a village in Kėdainiai district municipality, in Kaunas County, in central Lithuania. According to the 2021 census, the village had a population of 1157 people. It is located next to the north eastern edge of Kėdainiai, on the left bank of the Nevėžis river. There is a kindergarten, a library, a sports school, a culture house, Water Management Institute of Vytautas Magnus University Agriculture Academy.

== History ==
Vilainiai has been known since 1744. There was a manor and a watermill till the mid-20th century. It developed largely during the Soviet era as a settlement of Land Improvement Institute.

== Demography ==
Historical population

Year	Pop.	±% p.a.
1859	25	—
1902	79	+2.71%
1923	132	+2.47%
1959	239	+1.66%
1970	565	+8.14%
1979	1,414	+10.73%

Year	Pop.	±% p.a.
1987	1,691	+2.26%
1989	1,895	+5.86%
2001	1,490	−1.98%
2011	1,330	−1.13%
2021	1,157	−1.38%

Source: 1902, 1923, 1959 & 1970, 1979, 1989, 2001, 2011, 2021

== Images ==
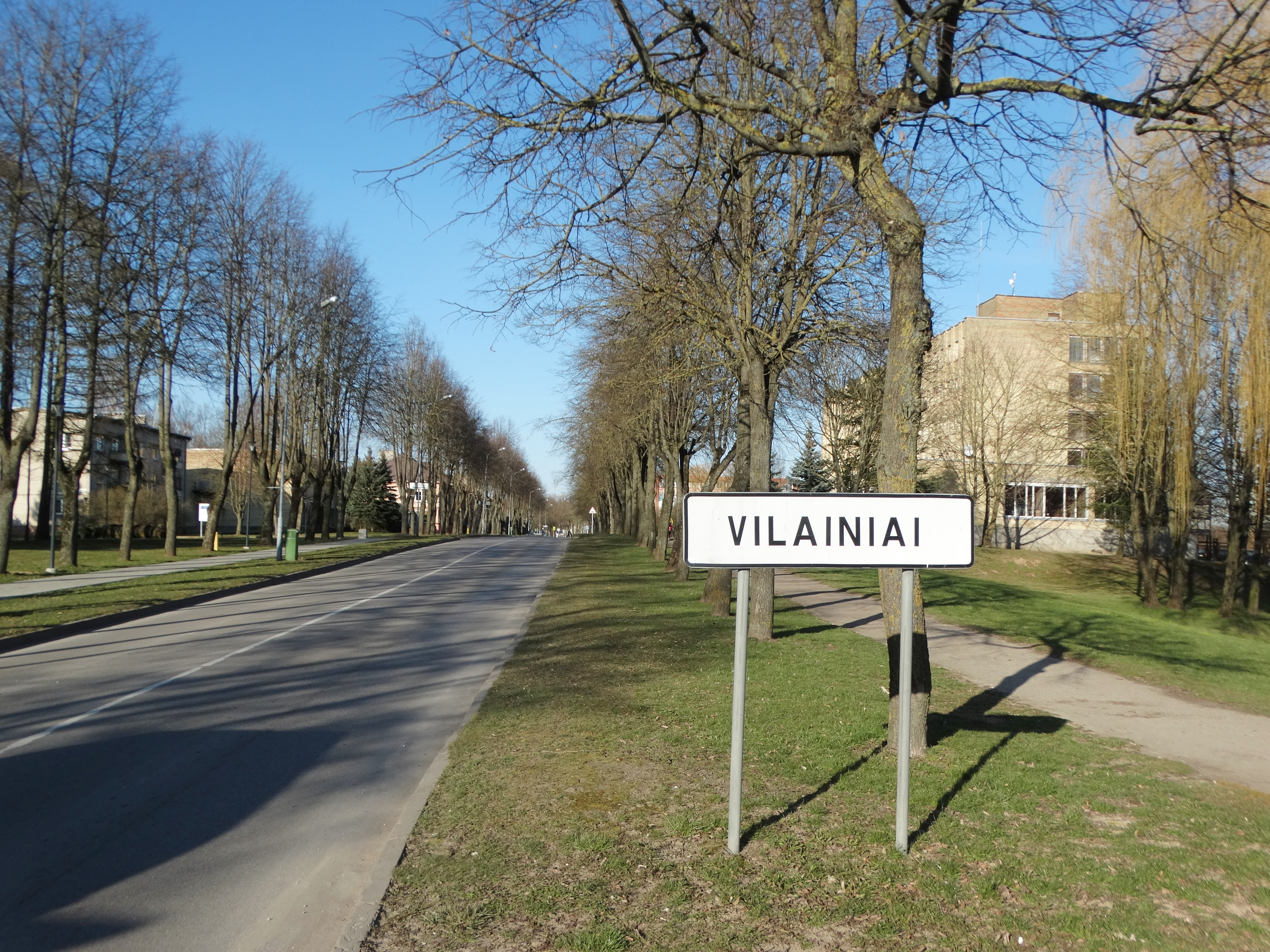
Vilainiai roadsign

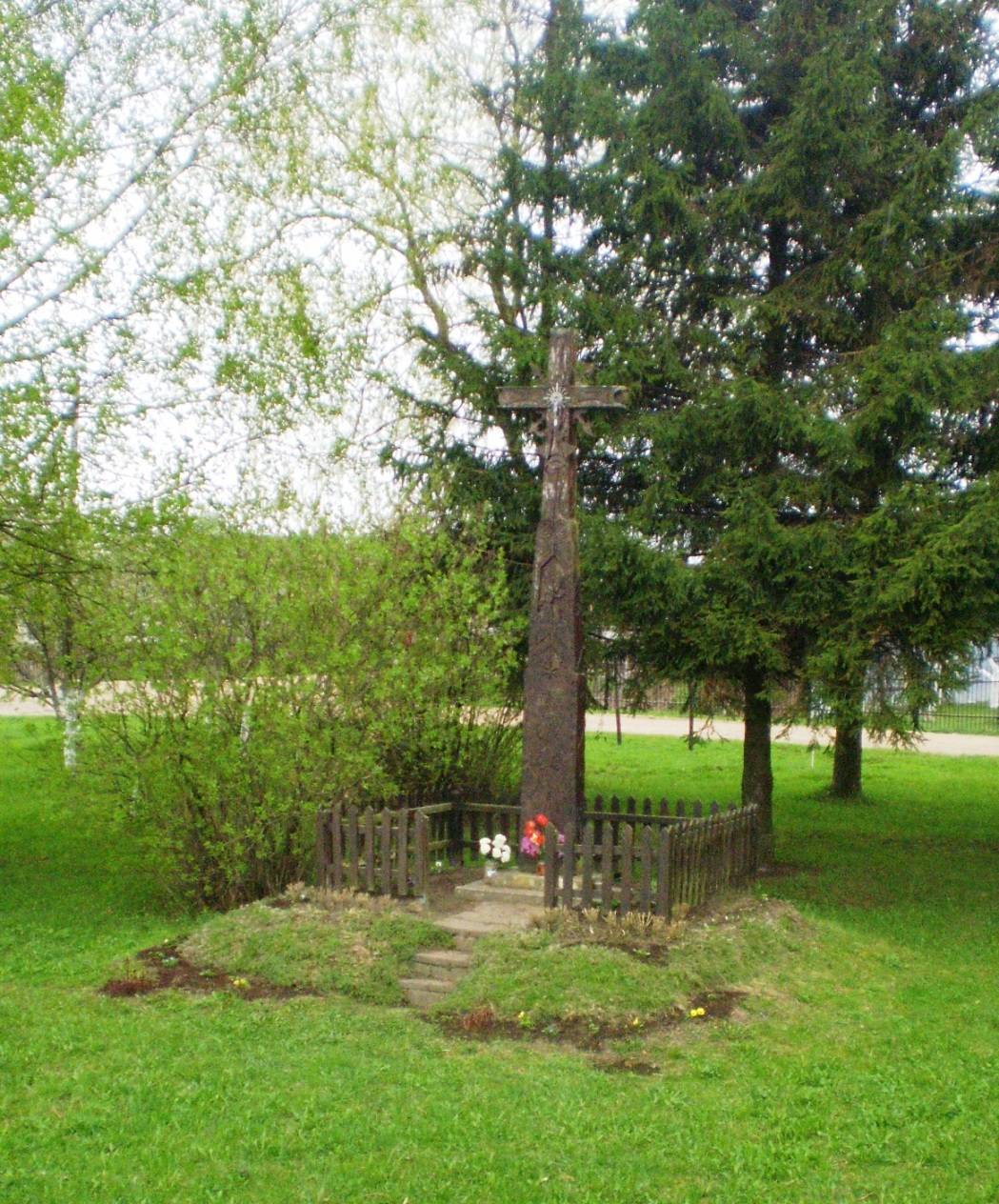
Wayside cross

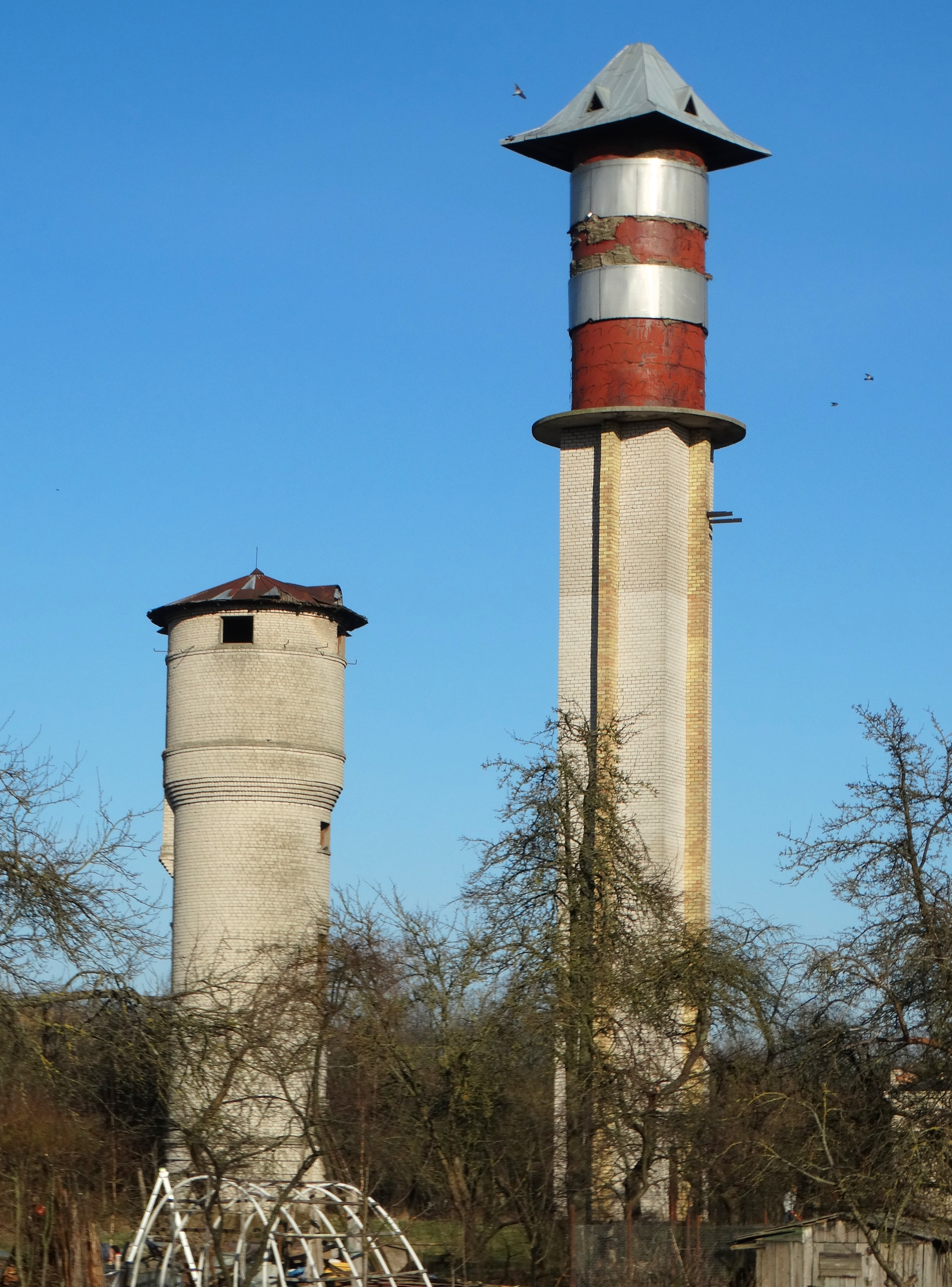
Water towers in Vilainiai

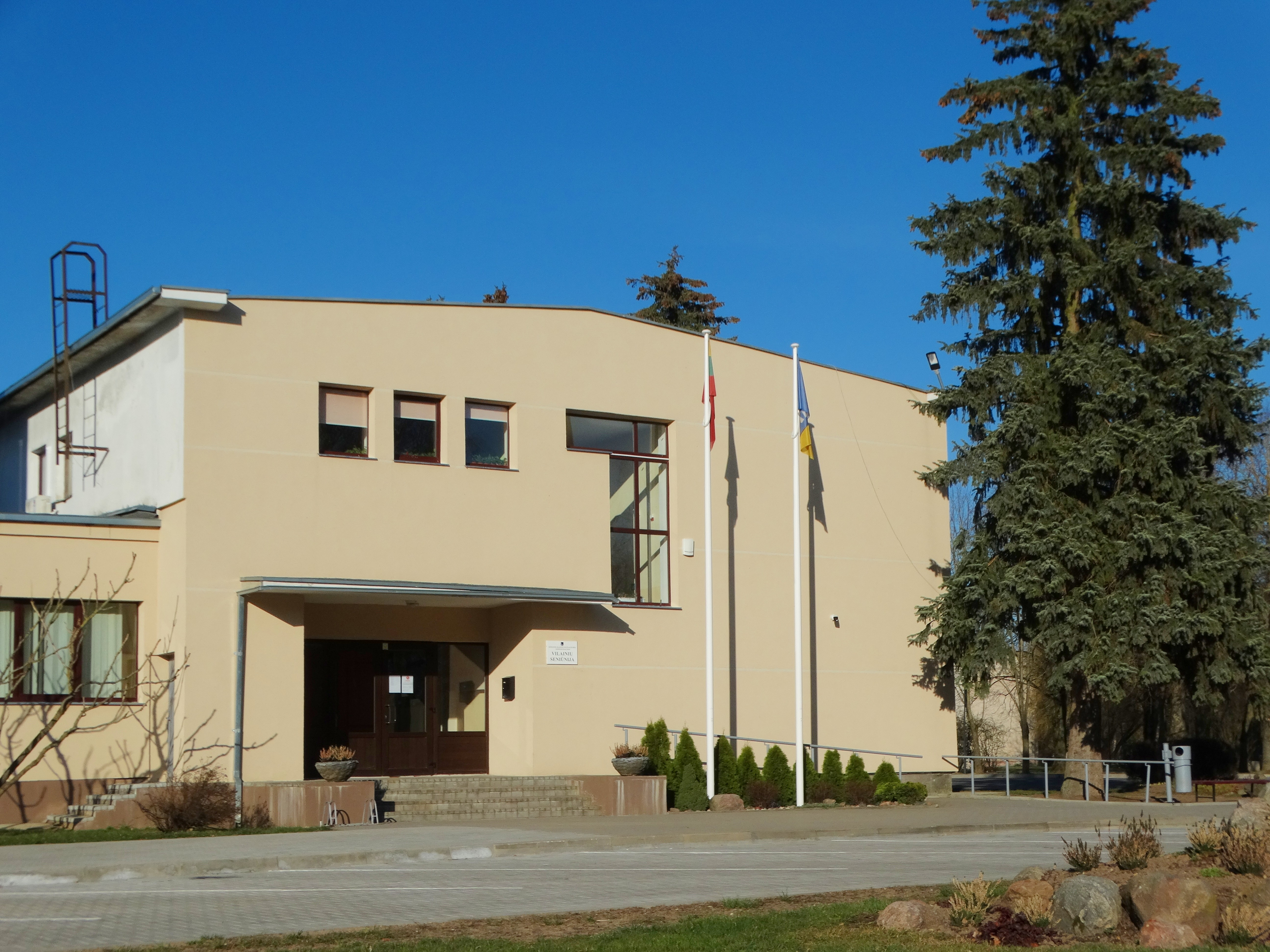
Eldership administration
