= Les Poppys =

French musical group composed of children

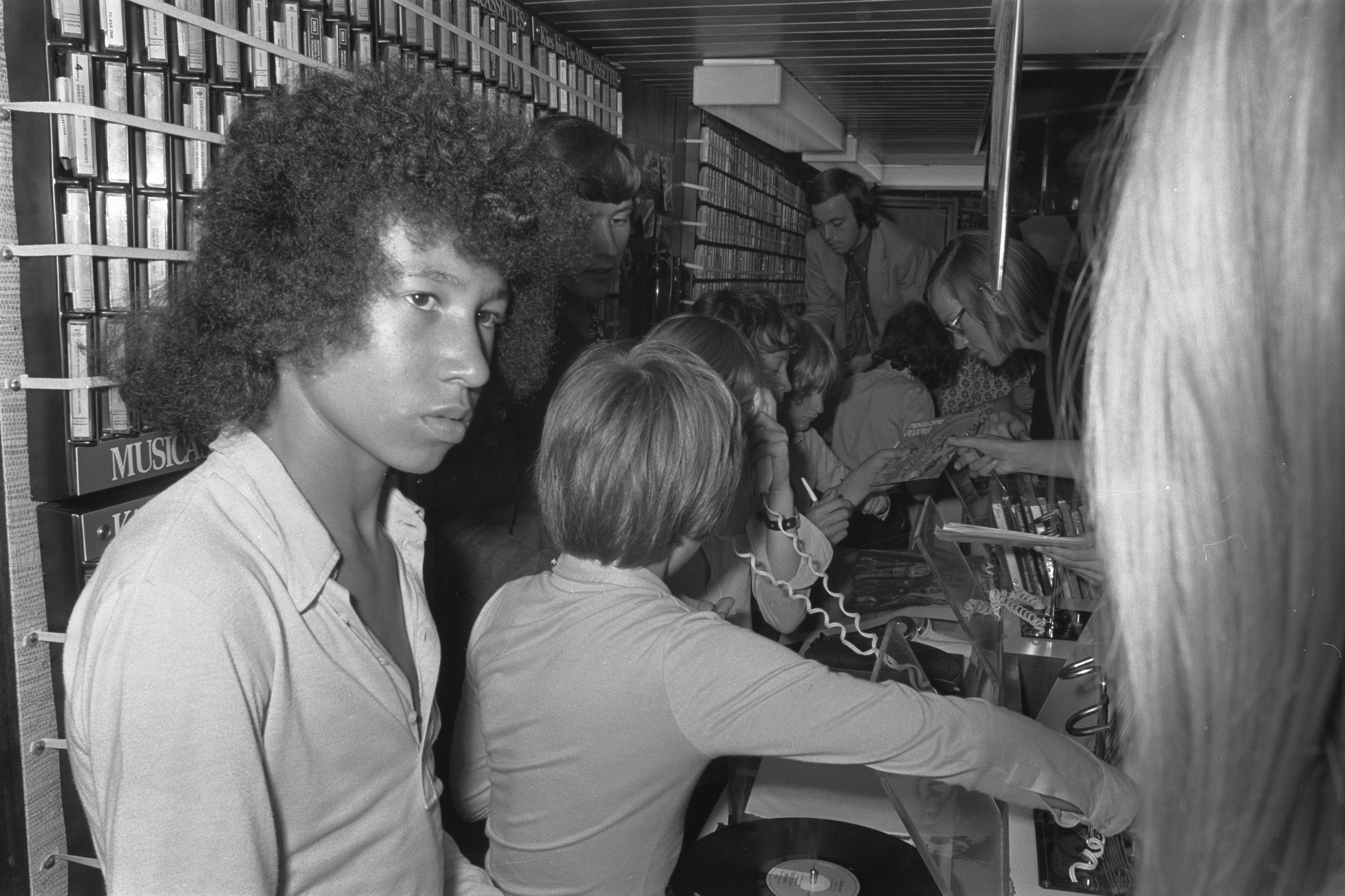
Bruno Polius & Les Poppys (1972)

Les Poppys is a French musical group of 17 children founded in 1946 in Asnières, France by Jean Amoureux as Les Petits Chanteurs d'Asnières and renamed to Les Poppys in 1970. Francois Bernheim, former singer of the group Les Roche-Martin and artistic director for the record company Barclay, discovered the singers in 1970 and decided to create a group called Les Poppys, named after the word 'Pop Music'.

Les Poppys originated from the Hippie movement and made songs against the Vietnam War. Seventeen boys from the choir were then selected and recorded their first single: 'Noel 70'. The success came very quickly and 600,000 copies were sold. This first single was then followed by other hits during the 70's: 'Isabelle, je t'aime' (500,000 copies sold). The most successful chanson was Non, non, rien n'a changé, for which Bruno Polius was the lead solo singer, and which sold 1,200,000 copies and was a number one hit in The Netherlands and stayed in the Dutch Top 40 for 25 weeks.

Les Poppys became the first child stars in French music history and were quickly invited by other countries to sing in galas, concerts and TV shows. In The Netherlands and in Germany, they even sold more records than the Beatles. In 4 years, Les Poppys sold more than 5 million records and produced four albums and 20 singles from 1970 to 1977. Their success inspired the New Poppys and other groups such as Mercredi Libre from members of Les Petits Chanteurs D'Asnières.

The small singers of Asnières, as they were, consisted of the first generation of Poppys: Bruno Polius, Harry Trowbridge, Philippe and Gabriel Képéklian, Thierry and Philippe Sellier, Philippe and Jean-Pierre Herman, Philippe Magnan, Jean-Jacques Gallard, Pascal Buffenoir, Pierre Puyhardy, Olivier Dubrez, Benoit Cabane, Christophe Normand, Bernard Carayon, Olivier Antignac. Some among them left since 1971 to yield to the second generation of Poppys which included Gérald Meunier, Pascal Oubrayrie, Alain Drexler, Pascal Réali and Daniel Danglard. The group ended in 1978 but Les Petits Chanteurs d'Asnières kept on recording, making backgrounds vocals for famous singers.

They also sang in 1983 for a TV musical covering songs by ABBA called Abbacadabra. Their 2 albums made were called: Abbacadabra and La Fusée de Noé. They also had a one off success with the song "Il faudra leur dire" sung with Francis Cabrel which went gold in 1987.

They have since tried a comeback firstly in the late eighties under the name The New Poppys and in 1992 as Mercredi Libre. Although these last recordings were not commercially successful the album La ballade des p'tits anges has become highly praised and sought after. Although it has been suggested that the singing is better on this CD it is most likely due to the new songs included on this CD. The music to Commandant de la Calypso, La ballade des p'tits anges, Je te demande pas and other popular songs from this album was written by Francois Bernheim. The Poppys still go on tour occasionally.

== Selected discography ==
- Noël 70 (Christmas 70) (1970)
- Non, je ne veux pas faire la guerre... (No, I don't want to make war... ) (1970)
- Non, non, rien n´a changé (No, no, nothing has changed) (1971)
- Des chansons pop (Pop songs) (1971)
- Love, lioubov, amour (Love, love, love) (1971)
- Non, ne criez pas... (No, don't shout...) (1971)
- Laissez entrer le soleil (Let the sunshine in) (1971)
- Des chansons pop (Pop songs) (1972)
- Jésus revolution (Jesus revolution) (1972)
- L'Enfant do (The child do) (1972)
- Liberté (Liberty) (1972)
- Pénélopie (Penelope) (1972)
- L´école est finie (School's out) (1972)
- Septembre noir, Decembre blanc (Black September, white December) (1972)
- Non, non rien n'a changé (No, no, nothing has changed) (1973)
- American Trilogie (American Trilogy) (1973)
- Au nom de l'amour (In the name of love) (1973)
- Isabelle, je t'aime (Isabelle, I love you) (1973)
- Isabelle, je t'aime (Isabelle, I love you) (1974)
- Des chansons pop (Pop songs) (1974)
- Glory Alleluia (Glory Glory Hallelujah) (1974)
- En l'an 300 000 000 (In the year 300,000,000) (1975)
- Il faut une fleur pour faire le monde (One needs a flower to make the world) (1976)
- Juste une question (Just one question) (1976)
- Demain c´est un autre jour (Tomorrow is another day) (1977)
- Quelqu´un viendra (Someone will come) (1977)
- Le mini minimum (The mini minimum) (1977)
- Non, non rien n'a changé (No, no, nothing has changed) (1977)
- Visite (Visit) (1980) with Lenny Kuhr
- Supercalifragilisticexpidelilicieux (Supercalifragilisticexpialidocious) (1981)
- Tous les enfants ont les yeux bleus (All the children have blue eyes) (1990)
- Si le monde appartenait au] (If the world belonged to) (1991)
- Les Années Barclay (The Barclay Years) (2000)
- Madame je t'aime (Madam I love you) (2002)
- Poppys:Master Serie (Poppys:Master Set) (2003)
- Bing-Bang (Bing-Bang) (2003)
- Les enfants (The children) (2003)
- La chanson de Gavroche (The song of Gavroche) (2003)
- Vous avez été des enfants (You were children) (2003)
- Le mendiant de l'amour (The beggar of love ) (2004)
- S'il suffisait d'aimer... (If loving was enough...) (2004)
- La planète amour (The love planet) (2004)
- Les trois cloches (All the Chapel Bells Were Ringing) (2005)
- L'oiseau (The Bird) (2005)
- Les jardins du ciel (Gardens of the sky) (2005)
- Non, non rien n'a changé (No, no, nothing has changed) (2005)
- Est-ce qu on sera chinois (Will we be Chinese) (2005)
- Il ' N'y a Plus D'etoiles de Mer (There are no more starfish) (2005)
- Gala 60 ans Petits Chanteurs d'Asnières (Extract of the 60 years official reception of the choral society of the Small Singers of Asnières) (2006)
- Pour fêter le 60ème anniversaire de la chorale, les chanteurs d'Asnières, connus sous le nom de "Poppys", vont... (Will celebrate the 60th birthday of the choral society, the singers of Asnières, known under the name of "Poppys"...) (2006)
- Il ' N'y a Plus D'etoiles de Mer (There are no more starfish) (2007)
