= Truskava =

- Town
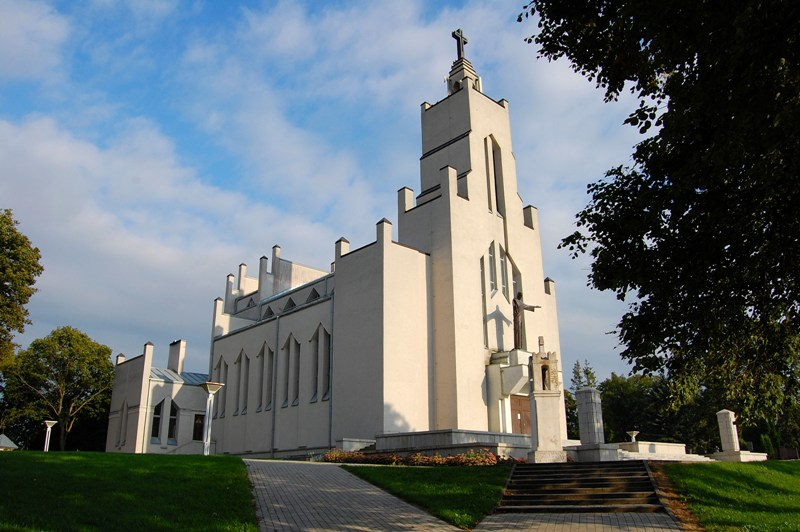
- Church of Truskava

- Location in Lithuania
- Coordinates: 55°25′50″N 24°13′40″E
- Country: Lithuania
- Ethnographic region: Aukštaitija
- County: Kaunas County

Population (2021)
  - Total: 92
- Time zone: UTC+2 (EET)
  - Summer (DST): UTC+3 (EEST)

Truskava is a small town in the northeastern part of the Kėdainiai District Municipality, located near the A8 (Panevėžys–Aristava–Sitkūnai) highway in central Lithuania. It is the centre of the Truskava eldership (seniūnaitija).

The town features the Church of the Holy Spirit of Truskava (built in 1998), the wooden Truskava cemetery chapel (dating from 1860), a cultural centre, the Truskava town cemetery, and retreat house. The Truskava Agricultural Cooperative (Truskavos ŽŪB) operates in the area. The Truskava Primary School, library, and post office are located in the nearby village of Pavermenys.

== Etymology ==
The town's name derives from the personal name Truskà, Truskáuskas, or Truskovskis (considered to be of Polish origin). It is a manorial toponym, originating from the surname of the Truskauskai (Truskovski) family, who owned the local estate in the 18th century.

== History ==
Until the 18th century, Truskava was in the centre of Pavermenys estate (Poniewieski poviat, hosting the Pavermenys Manor) and belonged to the Truskauskai family (nearby Truszkovski estate, then confiscated in 1831), from whose name the town is derived. Later, the estate came under the ownership of Baron Bruno.

In 1760, at the initiative of priest Prielgauskas, a chapel was built on an elongated hill, and in 1794 Jonas and Barbora Truskauskai constructed the first wooden Church of the Holy Spirit on the hilltop. The current brick church was completed and consecrated in 1998. On the western side stood the rectory, behind which, according to local history, there was once a deep pit. A local folktale recounts its origin:

"Once, the priest of Ramygala quarreled with some pious women and ordered the devil to take them away. The devil put them in a sack, carried them to the top of Truskava Hill, and struck the sack against the ground so hard that he left a pit behind."

In 1831, K. Truskovskis led insurgents in the November Uprising in the Upytė district; as punishment, Truskava was confiscated by the Russian authorities in 1832. The January Uprising of 1863 also affected Truskava; a member of the Truskauskas family reportedly participated and organized a local weapons workshop before being arrested and dying in exile. By the late 19th century, Truskava was recorded as a small town in Panevėžys County.

A parish school was mentioned in 1863, and from 1899 several clandestine village schools operated with the support of priest J. Karbauskas. An official state primary school was established in 1903, followed by a private Lithuanian-language school in 1906. In 1903, the town had 281 inhabitants.

A new primary school building was constructed in 1907, although during the Lithuanian press ban period, secret Lithuanian classes were already being held in and around Truskava. The book smugglers (knygnešiai) and a parish school, which was supervised by the local curate, helped supply Lithuanian books to the schools.

During World War II, Truskava suffered heavy damage: between 22 and 28 July 1944, part of the town and its church were burned down.

In the Soviet era, Truskava became a subsidiary settlement of a collective farm (kolkhoz).

Timeline of administrative-territorial control
Period	Former administrative unit	Higher division
19th-century – 1947	Ramygala volost	Panevėžys County
1947–1950	Central Truskava volost	Panevėžys County
1950–1962	Central Trusvkava rural district	Ramygala District
1962-1995	Central Trusvkava rural district	Kėdainiai District
Since 1995	Truskava Eldership	Kėdainiai District Municipality

== Demographics ==
In 2011 it had a population of 129.
