= Rudekšna =

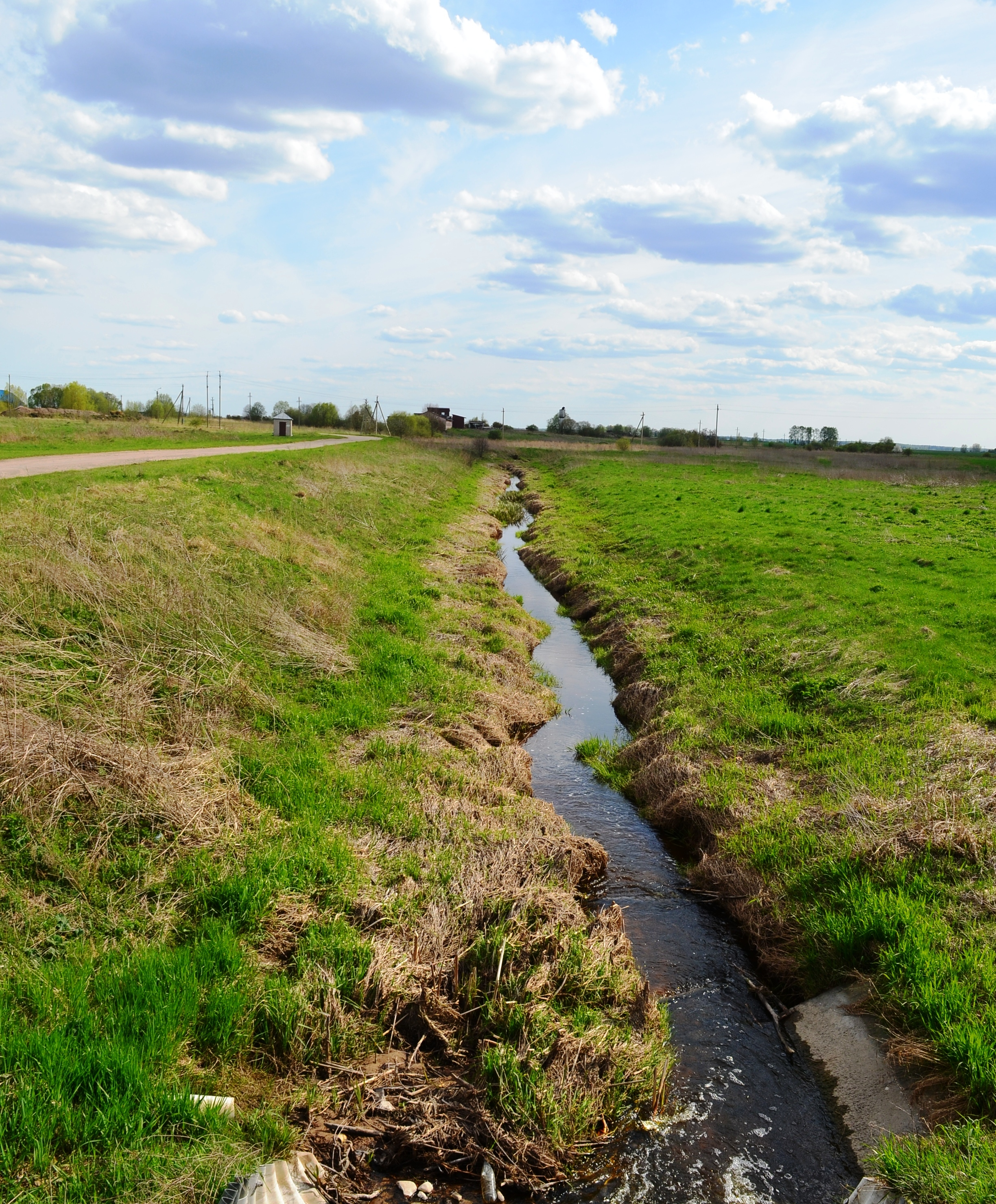
- Rudekšna in Pagiriai town

Location
- Country: Lithuania
- Region: Kėdainiai district municipality, Kaunas County

Physical characteristics
- Source
  - location: Gružai Forest
- Mouth: Obelis
  - coordinates: 55.3225°N 24.3698°E
- Length: 20.8 km (12.9 mi)
- Basin size: 41 km^{2} (16 sq mi)

Basin features
- Progression: Obelis→ Nevėžis→ Neman→ Baltic Sea
- Tributaries
  - left: Geležė

The Rudekšna is a river of Kėdainiai district municipality, Kaunas County, central Lithuania. It flows for 21 kilometres (13 mi) and has a basin area of 41 km^{2} (16 sq mi).

It starts nearby the Gružai Forest, on the Ukmergė District Municipality and Panevėžys District Municipality limits. The Rudekšna flows southwards and meets the Obelis river (from the right side) nearby Runeikiai village. Pagiriai town stands by the Rudekšna.

The name Rudekšna is derived from Lithuanian: rudas ('brown').
