= Bruno Polius =

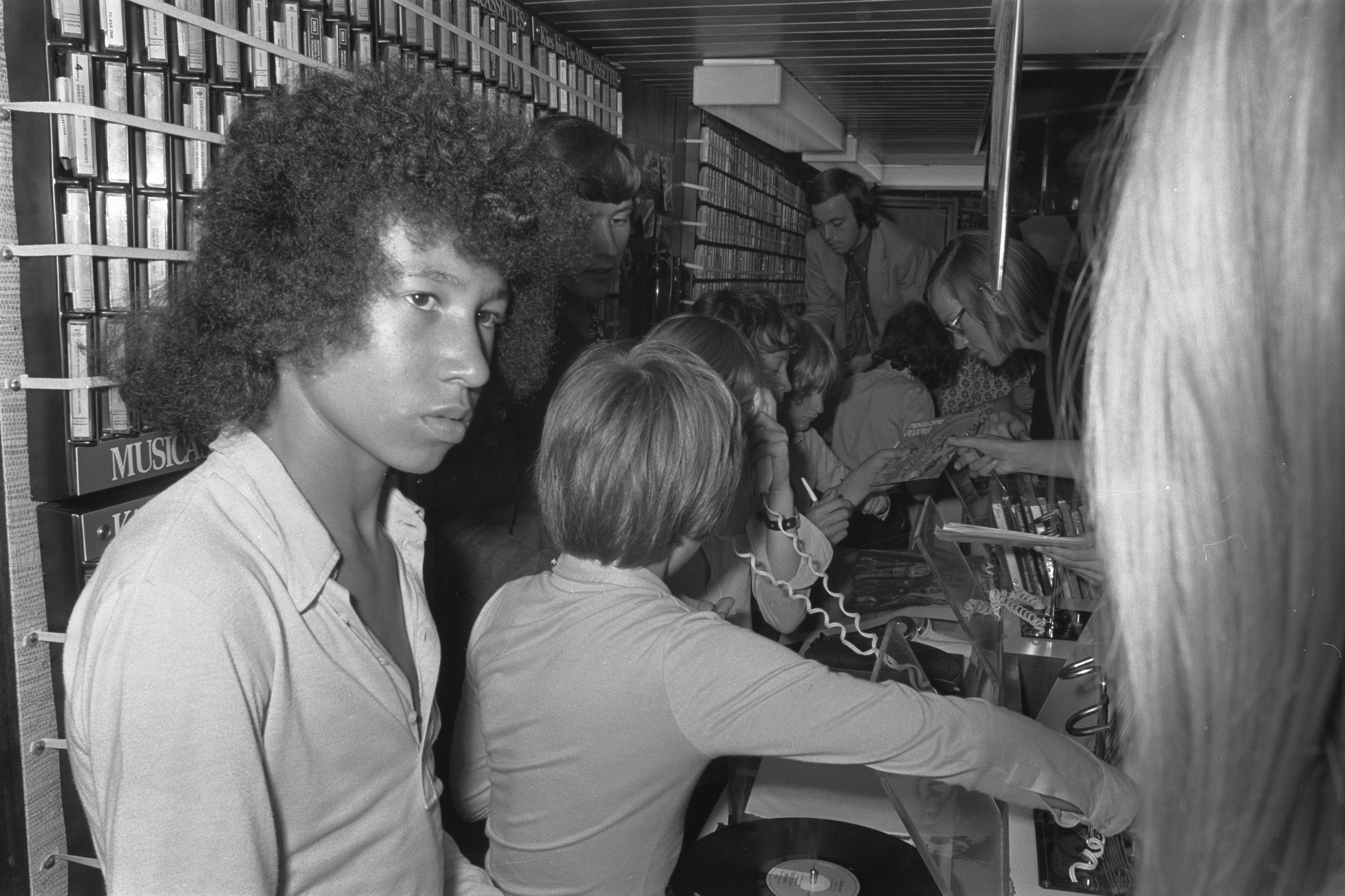
Bruno Polius (Amsterdam, 1972)

Bruno Polius (born 8 May 1958) or Bruno Polius-Victoire is a French singer. In the 1970s he was the lead singer/soloist of the boyband Les Poppys.

Although the lineup of Les Poppys changed several times, Bruno was the lead singer on the band's largest hit "Non-Non Rien n'a changé".

Bruno also recorded several records as solo artist, mainly during the same years as his membership of Les Poppys (see below).

== Records (selection) ==
As a solo artist he recorded the following singles

- Rosanna
- Hey l'Homme (1973)
- Au Revoir Mama / Il faut que tu reviennes (1974)
- Un Martiniquais, une Polonaise *1976)

=== Record selection Les Poppys ===
As main singer of the boyband Les Poppys, Bruno recorded the following singles

- Noël 70 (1970)
- Love, lioubov, amour (1970)
- Non, je ne veux pas faire la guerre... (1970)
- Isabelle, je t'aime (1970)
- Non, non, rien n'a changé (1971)
- Non, ne criez pas... (1971)
- Des chansons pop (1971)
- L'Enfant do (1972)
- Liberté (1972)
- Il faut une fleur pour faire le monde (1976)
- Visite (1980), with Lenny Kuhr
