= Pagiriai Eldership =

Pagiriai Eldership Pagirių seniūnija
- Eldership
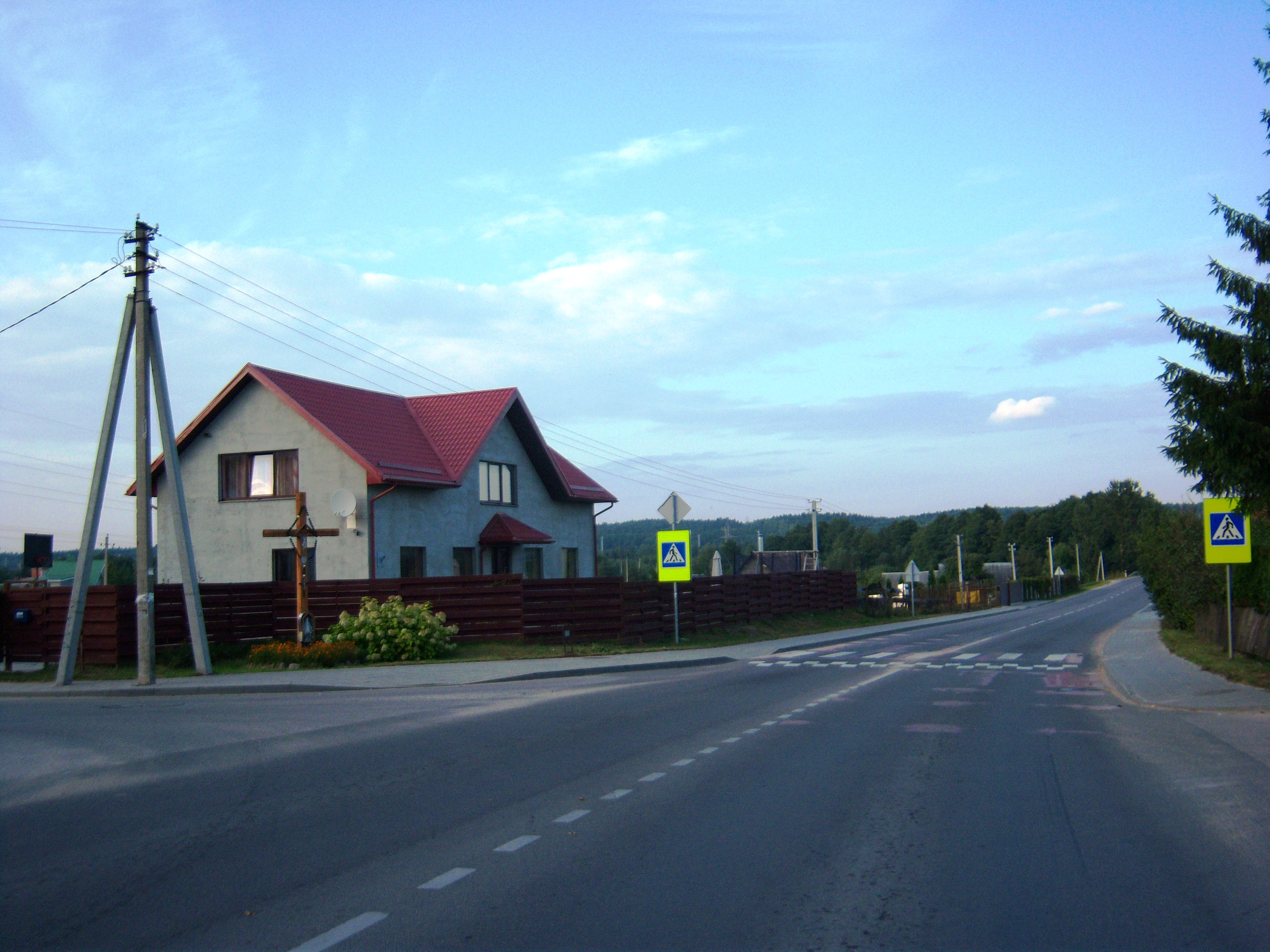
- Administration building

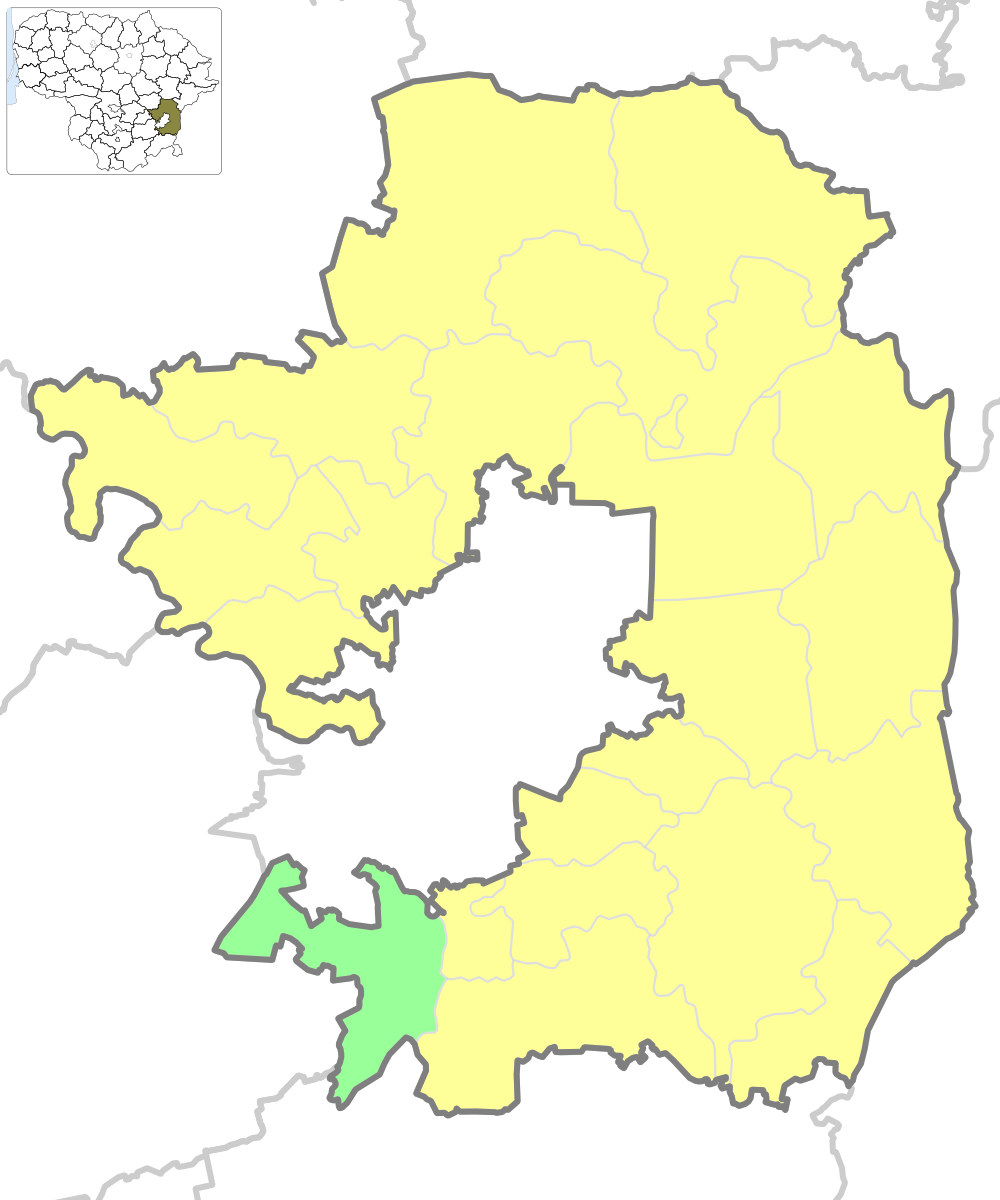
- Location of Zujūnai Eldership
- Country: Lithuania
- Ethnographic region: Dzūkija
- County: Vilnius County
- Municipality: Vilnius District Municipality
- Administrative centre: Pagiriai (Vilnius)

Area
  - Total: 87 km^{2} (34 sq mi)

Population
  - Total: 7,147
  - Density: 82/km^{2} (210/sq mi)
- Time zone: UTC+2 (EET)
  - Summer (DST): UTC+3 (EEST)
- Website: https://www.vrsa.lt

Pagiriai Eldership (Lithuanian: Pagirių seniūnija) is an eldership in Lithuania, located in Vilnius District Municipality, south of Vilnius.

== Ethnic composition ==
According to 2021 National Census data, the ethnic composition is as follows:

- Poles - 42,4%
- Lithuanians - 39,4%
- Russians - 7.8%
