= Pavermenys Manor =

Historical manor in Pavermenys, Lithuania

Coordinates: 55°25′10″N 24°14′16″E

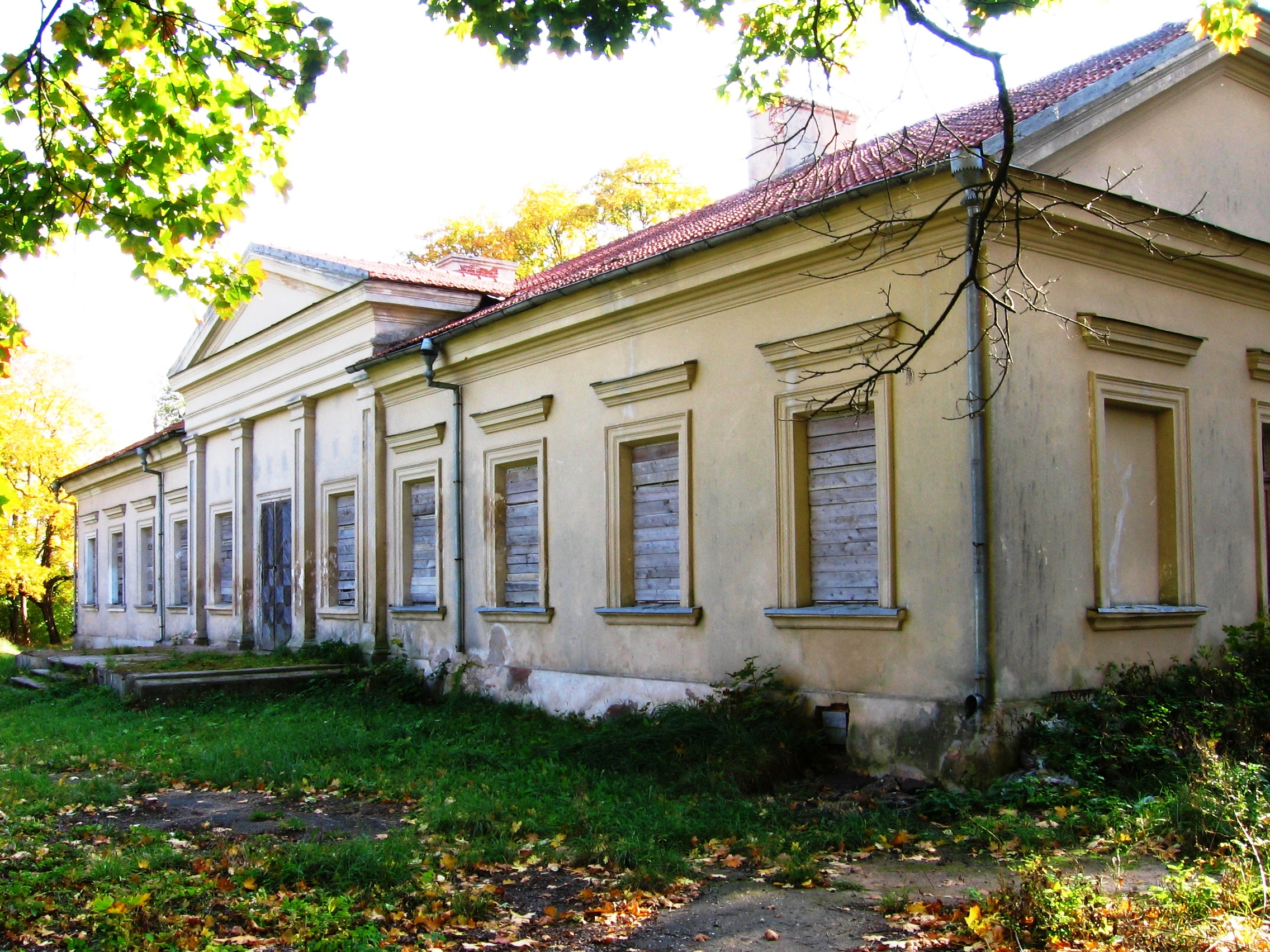
Pavermenis Manor (2008)

Pavermenys Manor (Lithuanian: Pavermenio dvaras) is a former residential manor in the village of Pavermenys, Kėdainiai District Municipality, Lithuania. Pavermenys Manor was established in 1585. The surviving ensemble includes two manor houses (one being a main manor building, dating from the 17th and 19th centuries), a granary, ice house, and park with old linden alley.

The main manor house is a two-storey Classical (Neoclassical) building with single-storey wings; the principal façade features a portico and the wall planes are articulated with pilasters. The manor is set within a landscaped park originating in the 18th century, where several notable and uncommon trees are recorded, including eastern white pine (Pinus strobus), large-leaved linden (Tilia platyphyllos), silver birch (Betula pendula) and yellow-flowering horse-chestnut (Aesculus flava).

== History ==
Pavermenys Manor was first mentioned in written sources from 1585. Over the centuries, it was owned by the Truskauskas, Brunov, Bružovskis, and Beriozov families.

Over time the estate was owned by several noble families, including the Truskauskai, Brunov (Brunovai/Brünnow), Bružovskiai and Beriozov families; the Brunov family, originally from Courland, took control of the estate in 1748 and at the end of the 18th century/beginning of the 19th century they erected the two current manor houses.

After World War II, the manor buildings were adapted for use as a school, which operated until 1983. Today, the manor complex is privately owned.

== Notable residents ==
- Stanislovas Brunovas (1859–1941) – Lithuanian baron and public figure.
