= Antanas Pocius =

Lithuanian choirmaster, organist and composer

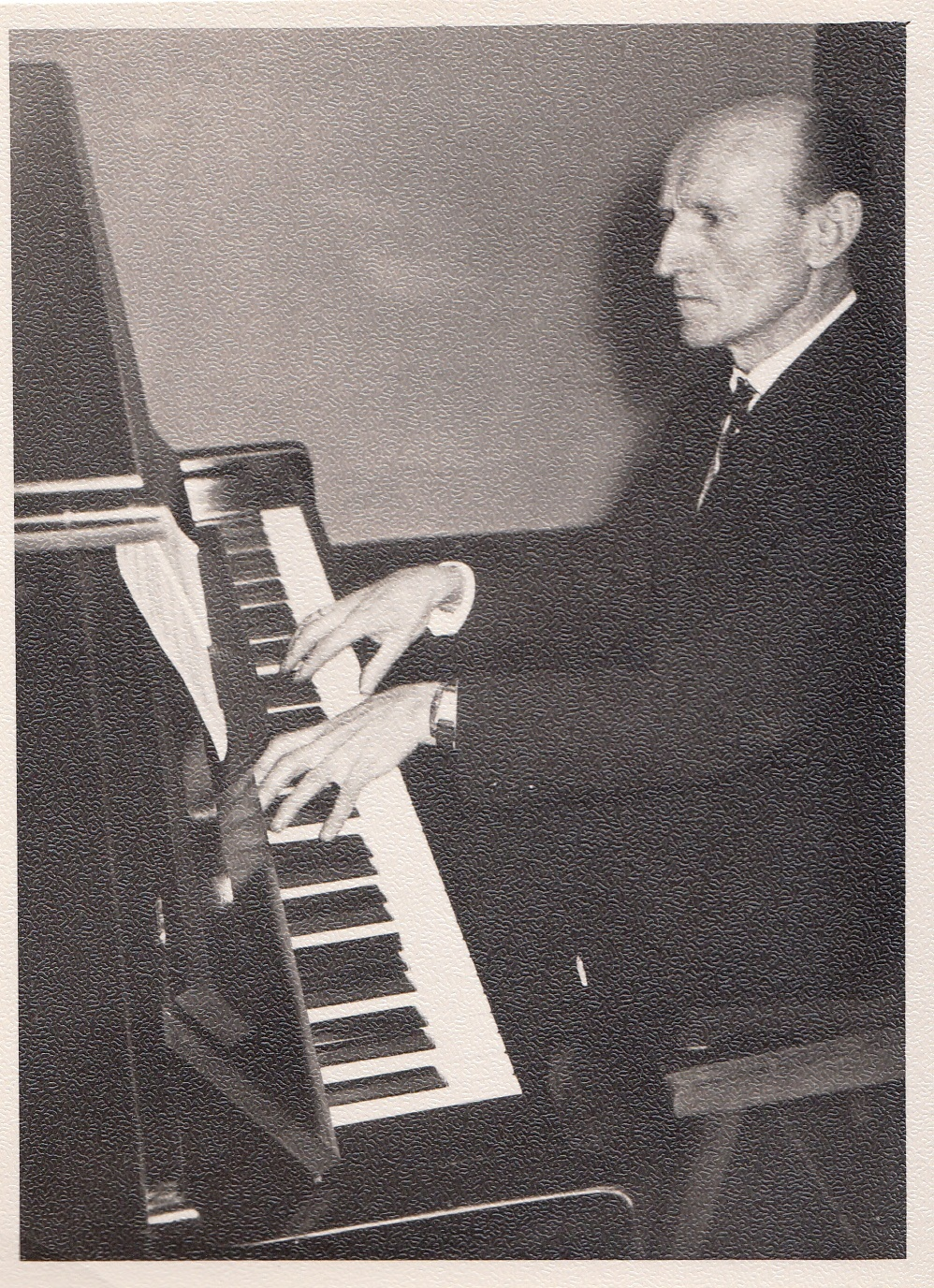
- Antanas Pocius, c. 1970
- Born: 19 August 1913; Pagiriai, Kovno Governorate, Russian Empire
- Died: 19 August 1983 (aged 70); Rietavas Hospital, Rietavas, Lithuanian SSR, Soviet Union
- Occupations: composer, choirmaster, organist, teacher
- Known for: Church music composer and lyricist
- Spouse: Laima Baltūsytė-Pocienė (1954-1983)
- Children: 1
- Parent(s): Petras Pocius and Rozalija Mockutė

Antanas Pocius (19 August 1913 – 1 April 1983) was a Lithuanian choirmaster, organist and composer.

== Early life and career ==
Antanas Pocius was born on 19 August 1913, in Pagiriai village, close to Tauragė in the Kovno Governorate of the Russian Empire (present-day Lithuania) in a very poor family and received the name of his grandfather, a village musician. A. Pocius was born very weak but survived infancy nevertheless and was the fifth child in the family. Due to challenging economic conditions, all the children would serve as shepherds, with A. Pocius starting at the age of four. Antanas' father Petras Pocius fought in the First World War and got his lungs injured, which resulted in the development of tuberculosis. He died when Antanas Pocius was only 12 years old, leaving the family in even tougher economic conditions.

After having finished three grades at the elementary school, Antanas Pocius started learning the trade of a tailor until he realised he would do better as an organist, as organs had been attracting his attention since an early age. He started taking classes with S. Batoras, an organist in Eržvilkas.

From 1940 to 1942, A. Pocius worked as an organist in Virbalis; in 1942, he started studying at the Kaunas Conservatory but could not finish it due to the war. From 1962 to 1966, he worked at the music school in Plungė as a teacher, and later, from 1966 to 1976, at the Plungė Academy of Music. He would then lead the Pensioners' choir from 1977 until 1981.

Antanas Pocius died on 1 April 1983, in the Rietavas hospital and was buried in Plungė.

== Pieces and songs ==
Antanas Pocius created many pieces of music and wrote lyrics to some of them, such as Sidabrinė jaunystė (Silver Youth) and Plungės parkas (Plungė Park), among others.
