= Šėta =

- Town
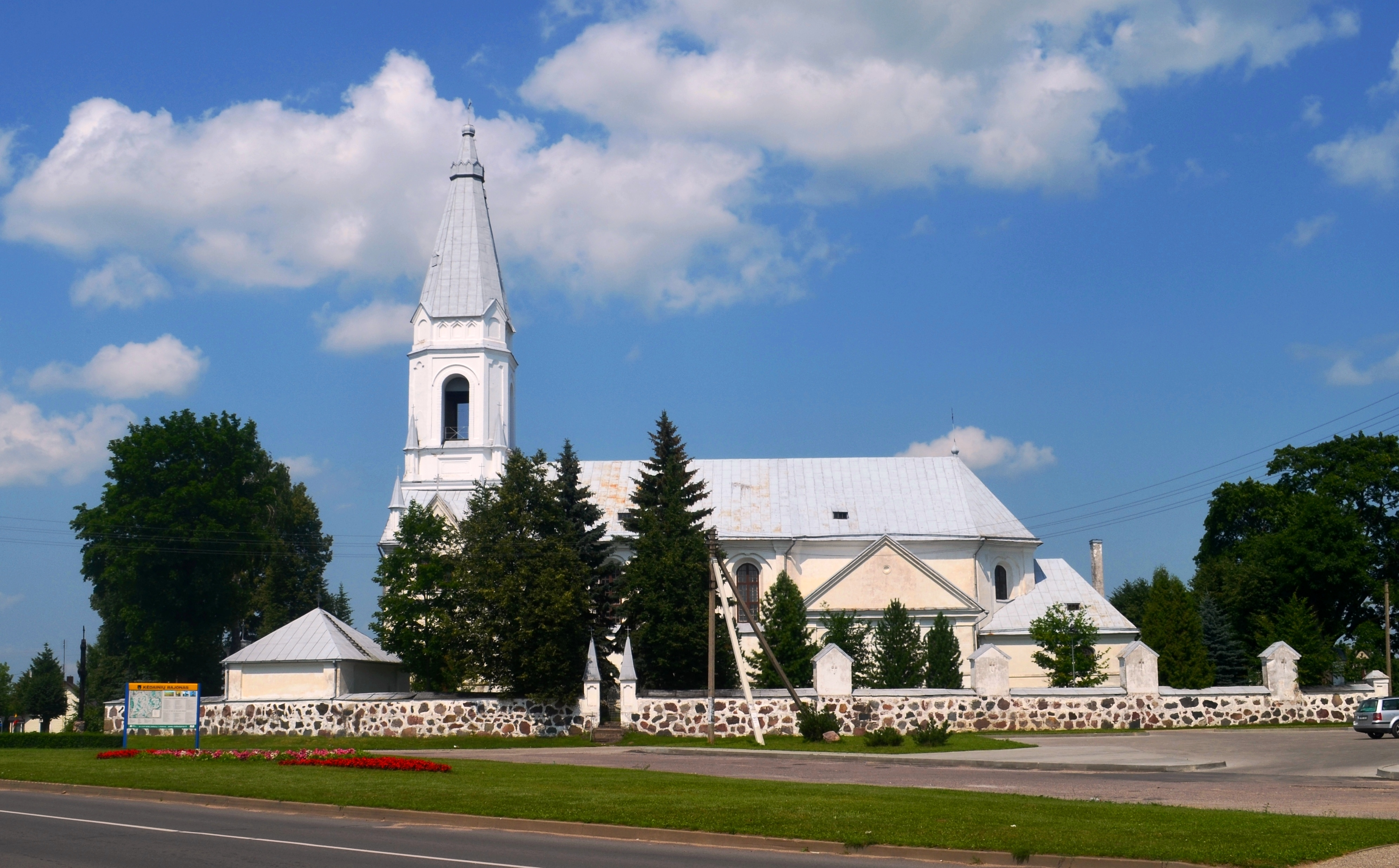

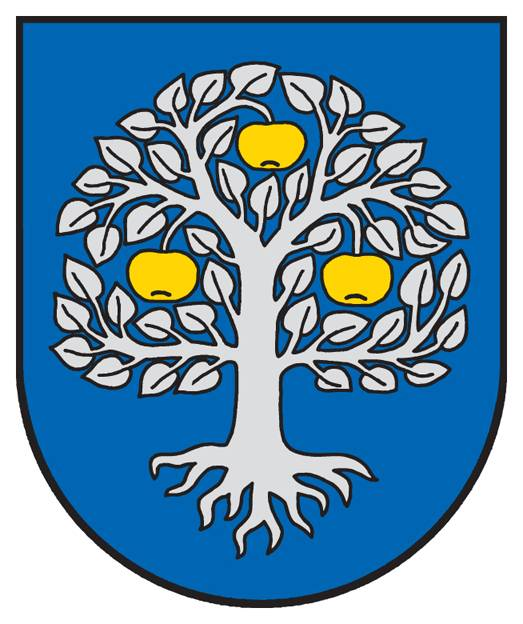
- Coat of arms

- Location in Lithuania
- Coordinates: 55°16′50″N 24°15′10″E
- Country: Lithuania
- Ethnographic region: Aukštaitija
- County: Kaunas County
- Municipality: Kėdainiai District Municipality
- Eldership: Šėta Eldership

Population (2011)
  - Total: 935
- Time zone: UTC+2 (EET)
  - Summer (DST): UTC+3 (EEST)

Šėta is a small town (miestelis) in Kėdainiai District Municipality, Kaunas County, central Lithuania. In 2011, it had a population of 935.

It is located by the Obelis river. The Vanga River flows into Obelis in the center of the town. A dam on Obelis creates the Šėta reservoir. There is the Šeta Botanical Reserve northeast the town.
