= Kėdainiai District Municipality =

Coordinates: 55°18′54″N 23°57′07″E

Kėdainiai District Municipality Kėdainių rajono savivaldybė
- Municipality
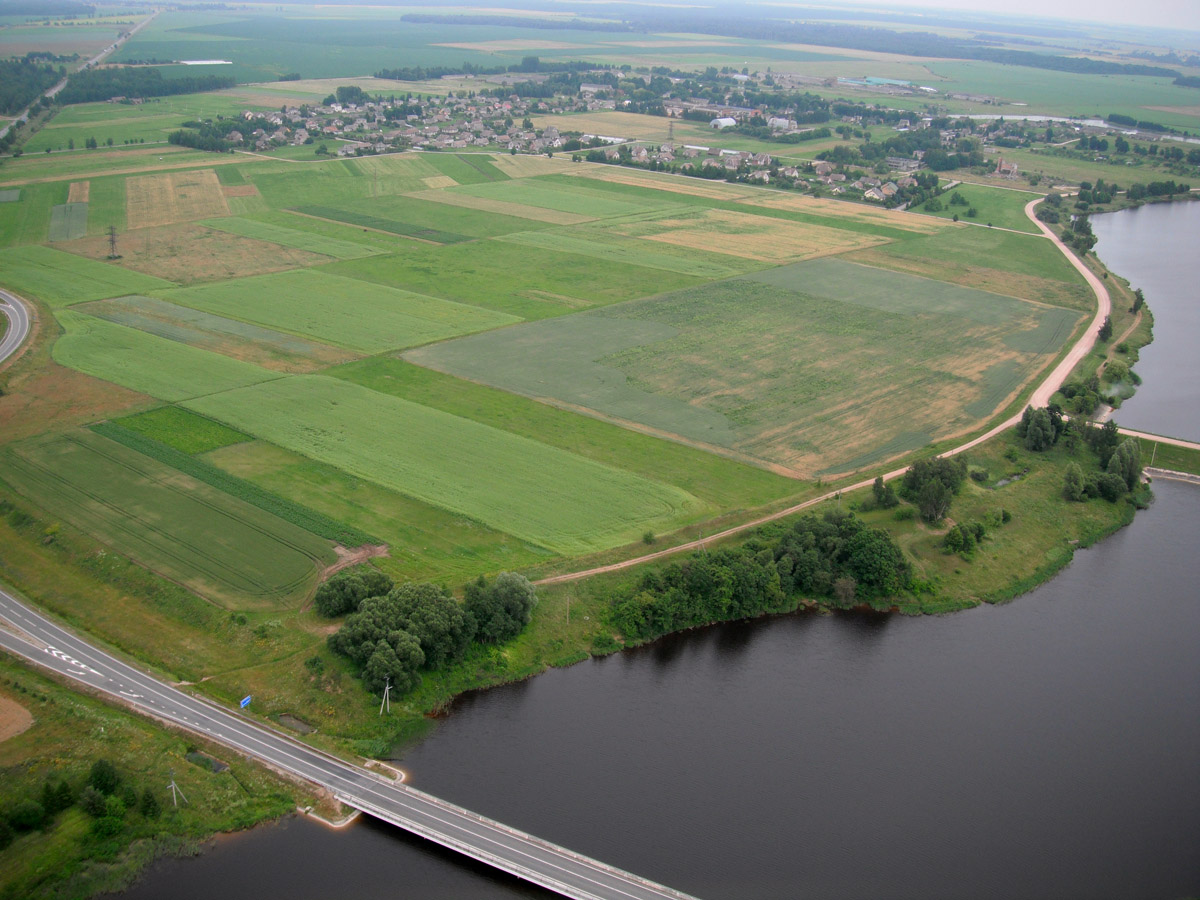
- Aerial photo of Aristava

- Coat of arms

- Location of Kėdainiai district municipality within Lithuania

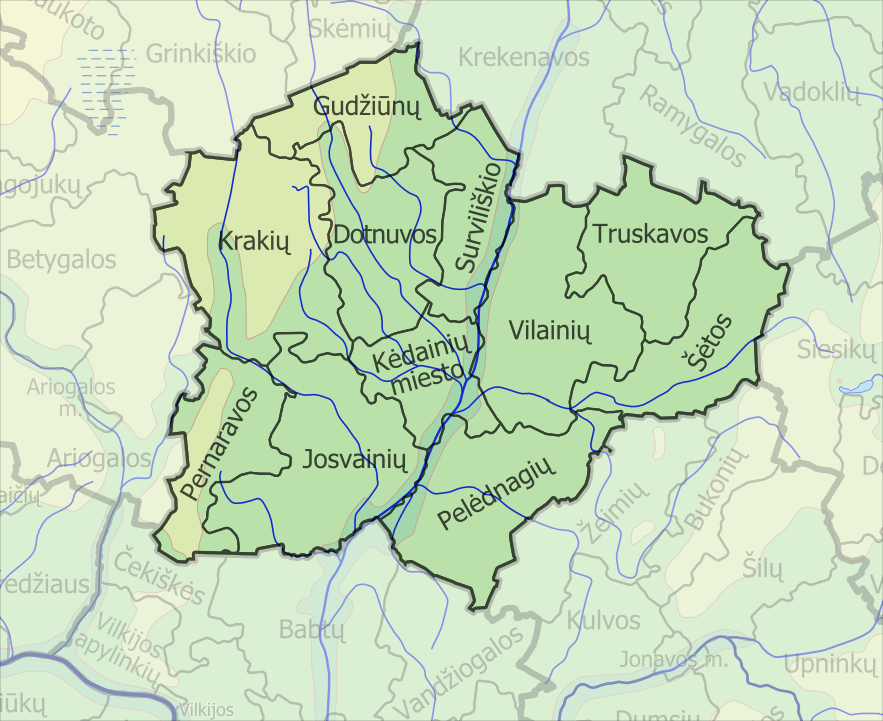
- Map of Kėdainiai district municipality
- Country: Lithuania
- Ethnographic region: Aukštaitija
- County: Kaunas County
- Capital: Kėdainiai
- Elderships: List: Dotnuva eldership; Gudžiūnai eldership; Josvainiai eldership; Kėdainiai City eldership; Krakės eldership; Pelėdnagiai eldership; Pernarava eldership; Surviliškis eldership; Šėta eldership; Truskava eldership; Vilainiai eldership

Government
  - Mayor: Valentinas Tamulis

Area
  - Total: 1,677 km^{2} (647 sq mi)
  - Water: 42 km^{2} (16 sq mi) 2.5%
  - Forest: 397 km^{2} (153 sq mi)

Population (2021)
  - Total: 46,382
  - Density: 27.66/km^{2} (71.63/sq mi)
- Time zone: UTC+2 (EET)
  - Summer (DST): UTC+3 (EEST)
- Telephone code: 347
- ISO 3166 code: LT-18
- Major settlements: Kėdainiai (pop. 22,677); Vilainiai (pop. 1,157); Josvainiai (pop. 1,122)
- Website: www.kedainiai.lt

Kėdainiai District Municipality (Lithuanian: Kėdainių rajono savivaldybė) is one of 60 municipalities in central Lithuania.

== Structure ==
Kėdainiai District Municipality is divided into:

- 1 city: Kėdainiai
- 10 towns: Akademija, Kėdainiai, Dotnuva, Gudžiūnai, Josvainiai, Krakės, Pagiriai, Pernarava, Surviliškis, Šėta and Truskava
- 11 elderships:

Coat of arms	Eldership	Administrative Center	Area	Population (2021)
	Dotnuva	Dotnuva	138 km^{2} (34,100.54 acres; 53.28 sq mi)	4,006
	Gudžiūnai	Gudžiūnai	93.5 km^{2} (23,104.35 acres; 36.10 sq mi)	1,292
	Josvainiai	Josvainiai	185 km^{2} (45,714.50 acres; 71.43 sq mi)	2,699
	Kedainiai City	Kėdainiai	44 km^{2} (10,872.64 acres; 16.99 sq mi)	24,547
	Krakės	Krakės	164 km^{2} (40,525.28 acres; 63.32 sq mi)	2,314
	Pelėdnagiai	Pelėdnagiai	141 km^{2} (34,841.86 acres; 54.44 sq mi)	3,467
	Pernarava	Pernarava	114.7 km^{2} (28,342.99 acres; 44.29 sq mi)	1,093
	Surviliškis	Surviliškis	83 km^{2} (20,509.75 acres; 32.05 sq mi)	1,277
	Šėta	Šėta	130 km^{2} (32,123.70 acres; 50.19 sq mi)	1,628
	Truskava	Pavermenys	130 km^{2} (32,123.70 acres; 50.19 sq mi)	969
	Vilainiai	Vilainiai	179 km^{2} (44,231.86 acres; 69.11 sq mi)	3,090

- 534 villages

== Population ==
=== Ethnic composition ===
Ethnic composition of Kėdainiai District Municipality according to the 2011 census:

- Lithuanians – 95.78% (51,777)
- Russians – 2.17% (1,171)
- Poles – 0.61% (329)
- Ukrainians – 0.28% (150)
- Belarusians – 0.26% (139)
- Romani – 0.07% (40)
- Germans – 0.03% (17)
- Others – 0.8% (434)

=== Largest settlements ===
Largest cities or towns in Kėdainiai District Municipality 2011 Lithuanian Census
Rank		Eldership	Pop.
1	Kėdainiai	Kėdainiai City Eldership	26648
2	Vilainiai	Vilainiai Eldership	1330
3	Josvainiai	Josvainiai Eldership	1057
4	Pelėdnagiai	Pelėdnagiai Eldership	1016
5	Šėta	Šėta Eldership	935
6	Vainotiškiai	Dotnuva Eldership	909
7	Krakės	Krakės Eldership	841
8	Akademija	Dotnuva Eldership	752
9	Labūnava	Pelėdnagiai Eldership	747
10	Dotnuva	Dotnuva Eldership	687
