= Židovice =

Židovice may refer to places in the Czech Republic:

- Židovice (Jičín District), a municipality and village in the Hradec Králové Region
- Židovice (Litoměřice District), a municipality and village in the Ústí nad Labem Region
- Židovice, a village and part of Libčeves in the Ústí nad Labem Region
