= Kėdainiai Bus Station =

Coach station in Kedainiai, Lithuania

Kėdainiai Bus Station Kėdainių autobusų stotis
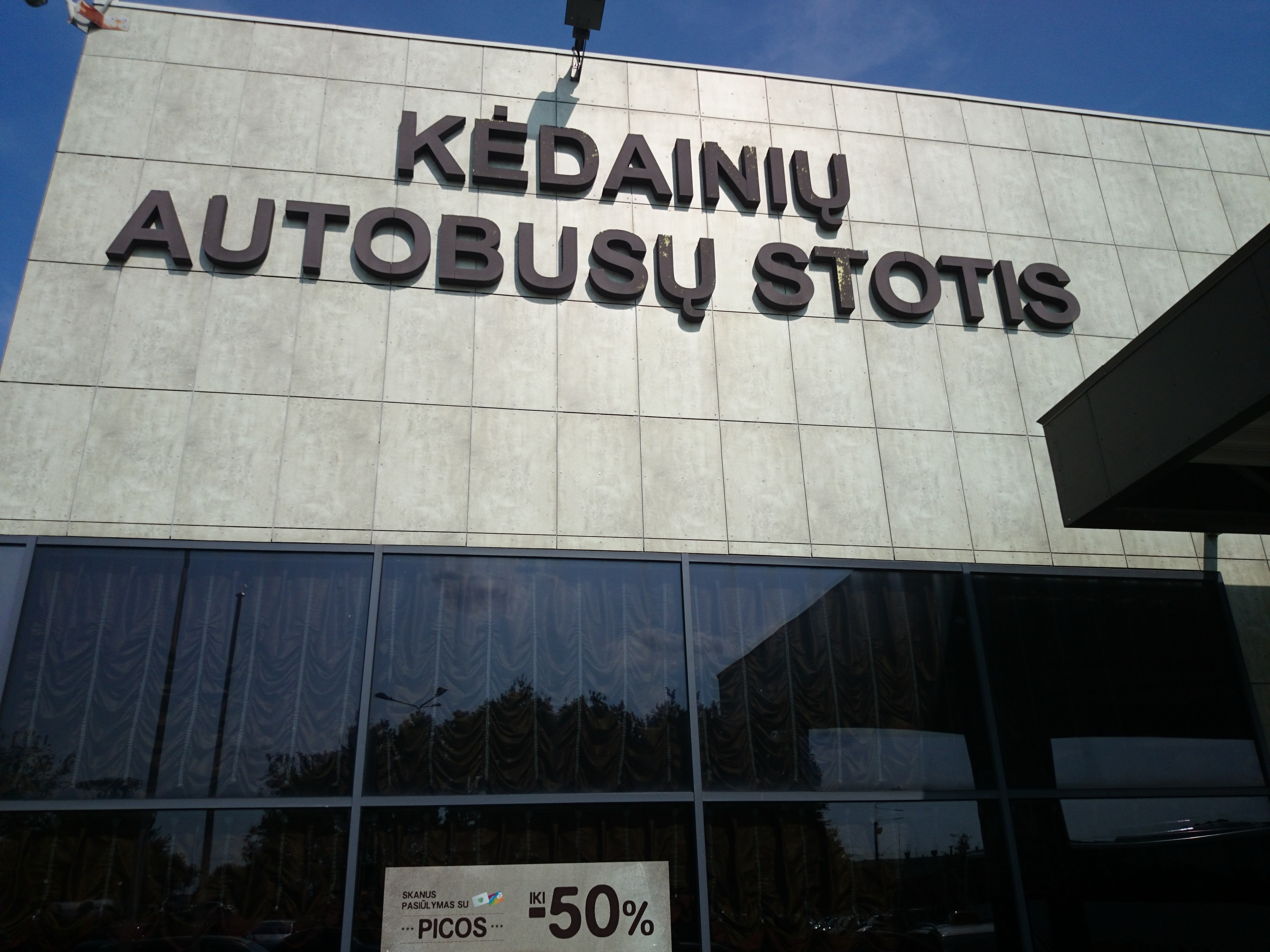

General information
- Location: J. Basanavičiaus g. 93; 57354 Kėdainiai; Lithuania
- Coordinates: 55°16′37″N 23°57′27″E
- Operator: Kedbusas
- Bus routes: 26
- Bus stands: 14
- Bus operators: Kedbusas; Kautra; Busturas; Panevėžio autobusai; Eurolines; Biržų autobusų parkas; Marijampolės autobusų parkas; Vilkaviškio autobusų parkas; Jonavos autobusai
- Connections: Bus interchange

Construction
- Parking: Yes
- Accessible: Yes

History
- Rebuilt: 2008

Key dates
- 1988: Relocated

Passengers
- 9,000 per day
Location

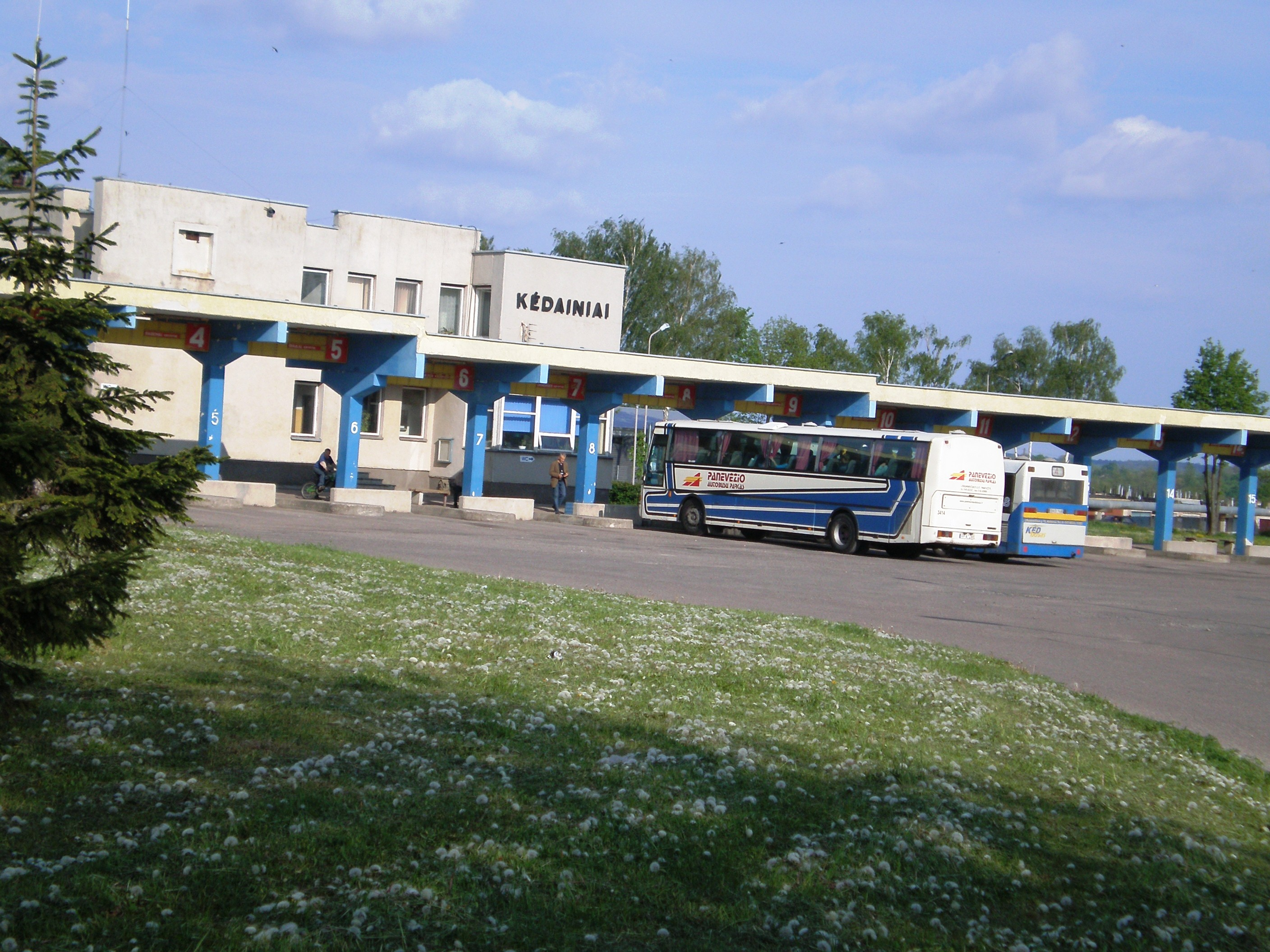
Station in 2006

Kėdainiai Bus Station is the central bus station in Kėdainiai, Lithuania. It serves as a terminal for suburban and national coach services.

== History ==
The first intercity bus station in Kėdainiai was located in the city centre. However, in 1988 it was moved to the outskirts of the city, where it remains today. Nearly 20 years later, it was completely rebuilt and reopened for service on 25 April 2008.

== Routes ==
^{Valid as of January 1, 2018}

=== Kaunas direction ===
- Alytus via Cinkiškiai, Kaunas
- Alytus via Nociūnai, Kaunas, Birštonas
- Alytus via Cinkiškiai, Babtai, Birštonas
- Druskininkai via Cinkiškiai, Kaunas
- Kaunas via Cinkiškiai, Babtai
- Kaunas via Labūnava
- Kaunas via Vandžiogala
- Marijampolė via Labūnava, Kaunas
- Marijampolė via Cinkiškiai, Kaunas
- Vilkaviškis via Vandžiogala
- Vilkaviškis via Cinkiškiai, Marijampolė

=== Raseiniai direction ===
- Panemunė via Kryžkalnis, Tauragė
- Palanga via Klaipėda (during summer only)

=== Ukmergė direction ===
- Vilnius via Šėta, Ukmergė

=== Šiauliai direction ===
- Joniškis via Šeduva, Šiauliai
- Joniškis via Linkuva, Pakruojis
- Mažeikiai via Šiauliai, Kuršėnai
- Akmenė via Šiauliai
- Palanga via Šiauliai, Telšiai, Klaipėda
- Žagarė via Šiauliai, Joniškis
- Šiauliai via Šeduva

=== Panevėžys direction ===
- Biržai via Panevėžys, Pasvalys
- Joniškėlis via Panevėžys
- Panevėžys via Ramygala
- Panevėžys via Šventybrastis, Upytė
- Panevėžys via Surviliškis, Upytė
- Riga with transfer at Panevėžys
