= Świętego Jana Street, Kraków =

Historic street in Kraków, Poland

Świętego Jana Street
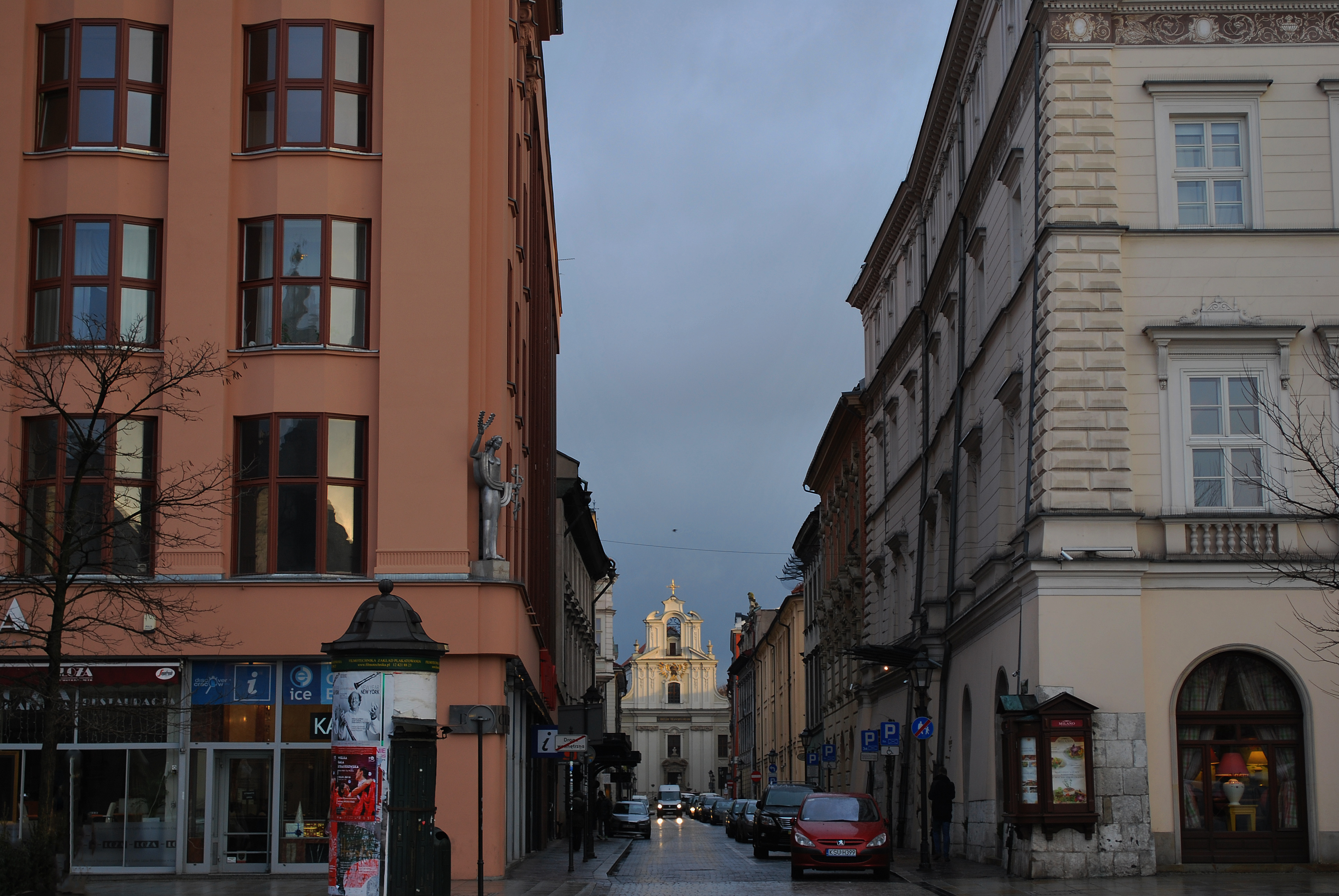
- View towards the north, with the Church of the Transfiguration of Jesus in the distance.

- Length: 285 m (935 ft)
- North end: Pijarska Street
- South end: Main Market Square

UNESCO World Heritage Site
- Type: Cultural
- Criteria: iv
- Designated: 1978
- Part of: Historic Centre of Kraków
- Reference no.: 29
- Region: Europe and North America

Historic Monument of Poland
- Designated: 1994-09-08
- Part of: Kraków historical city complex
- Reference no.: M.P. 1994 nr 50 poz. 418

Świętego Jana Street (Polish: ulica Świętego Jana, lit. St. John's Street) - a historic street in Old Town of Kraków, Poland.

The street begins in the south by the Main Square northwards to where it is closed off by the Church of the Transfiguration by Pijarska Street. The name of the street derives from the Church St. John the Baptist and St. John the Evangelist, first being recorded in the fourteenth century as platea S. Joannie Baptistae.

The street features several magnate palaces of the Czartoryski, Lubomirski, Popiel and Wodzicki szlachta families. The street is known for holding several funeral processions, inter alia of Józef Ignacy Kraszewski and Mikołaj Zyblikiewicz in 1887, and Stanisław Wyspiański in 1907.

== Features ==
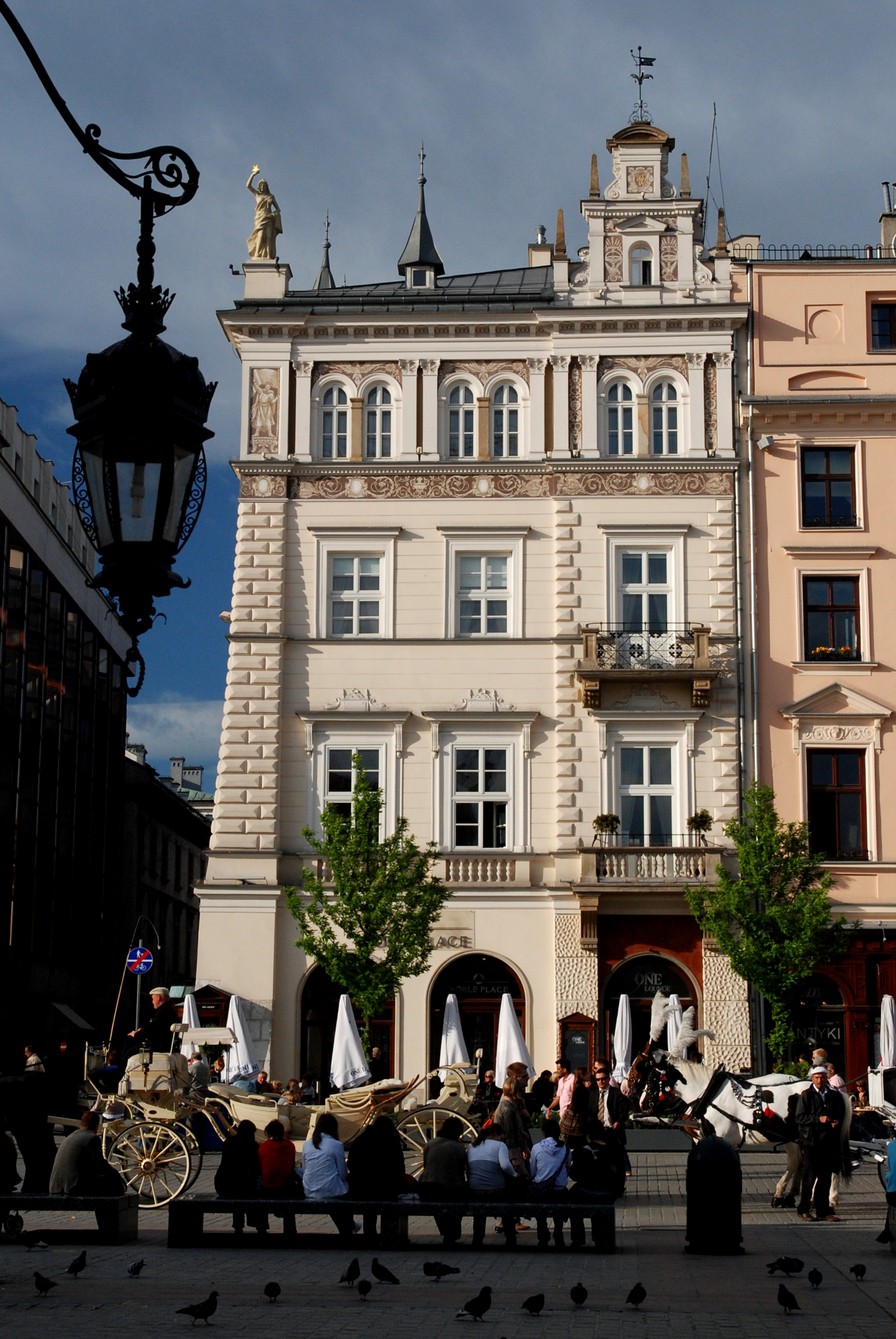
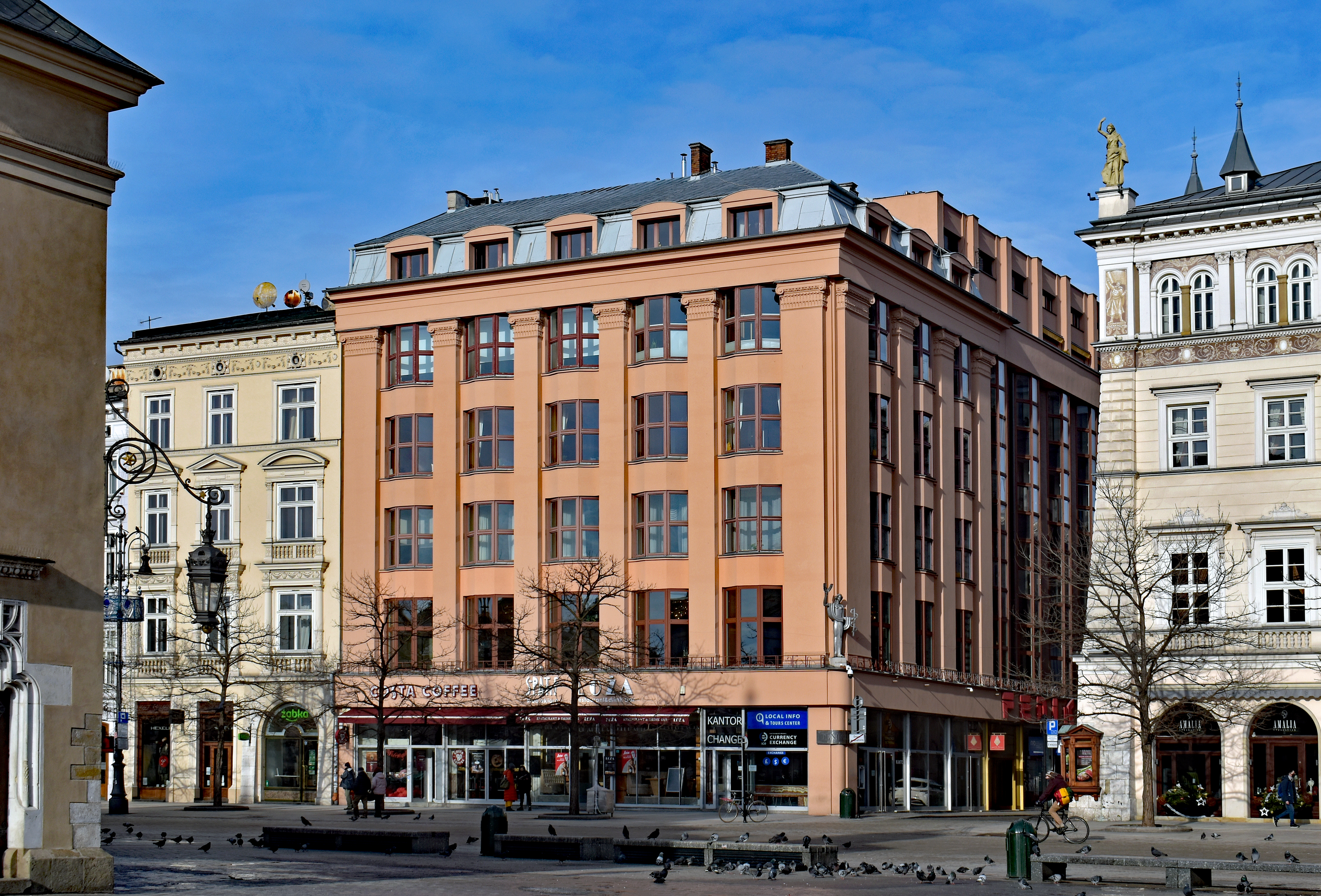
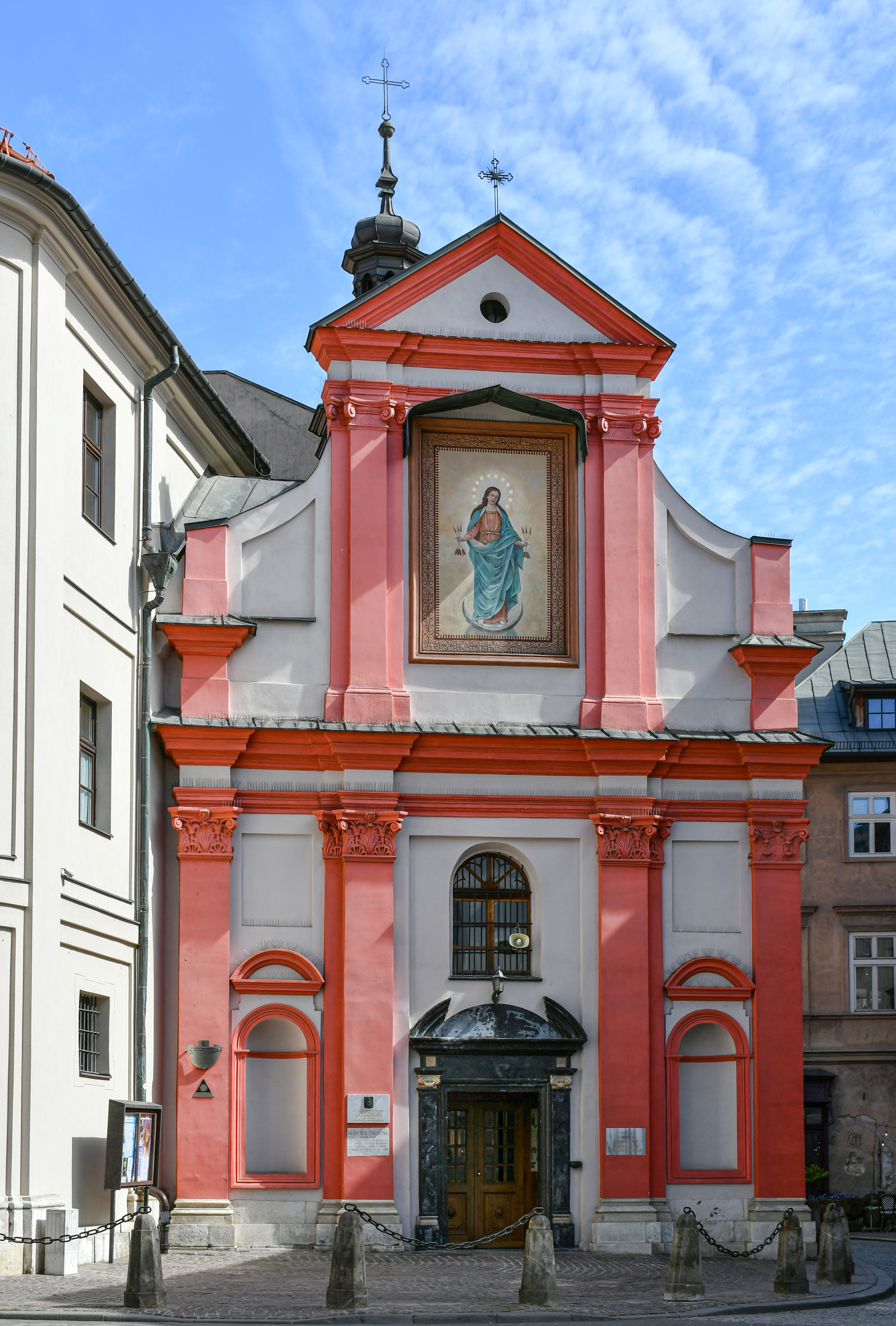
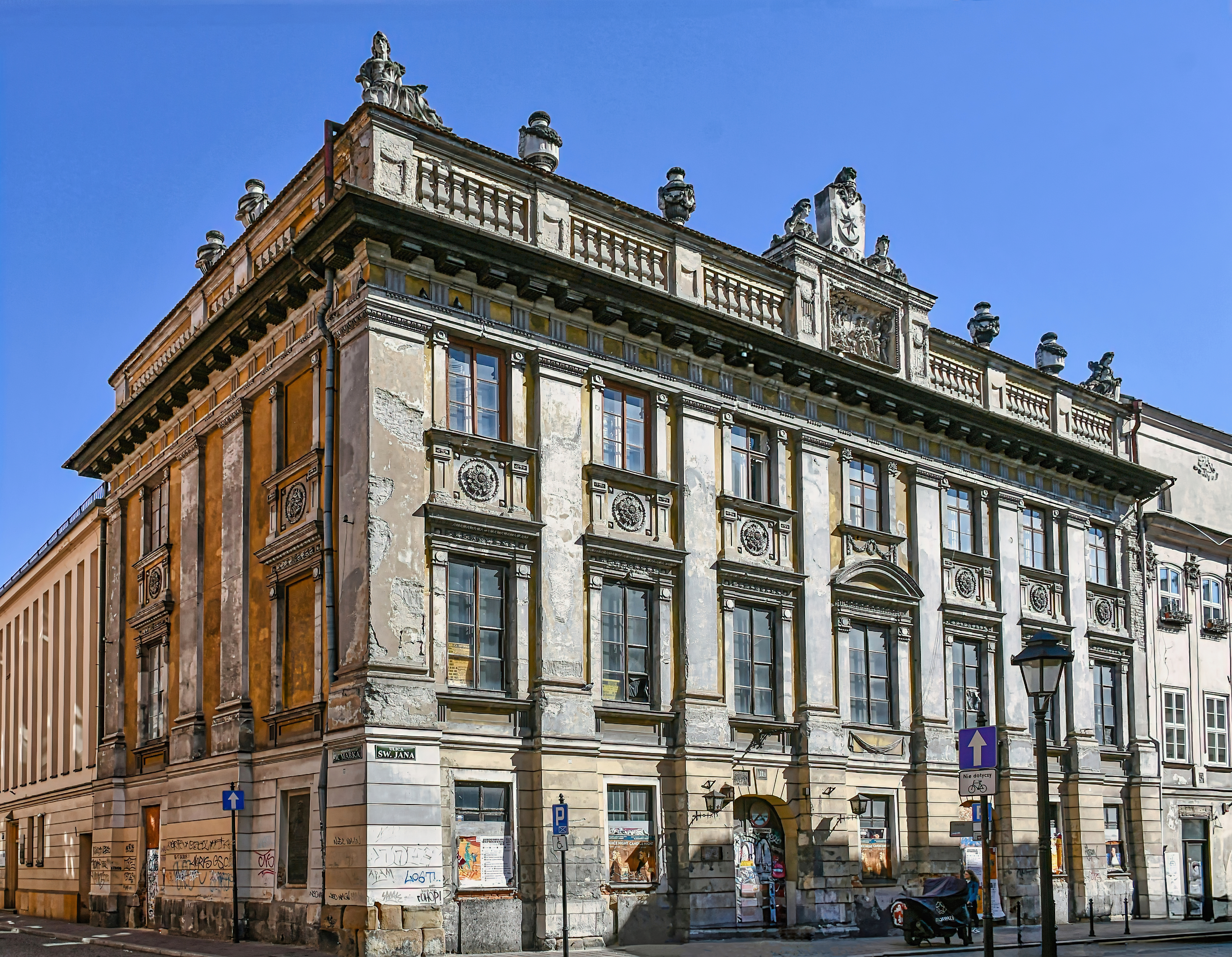
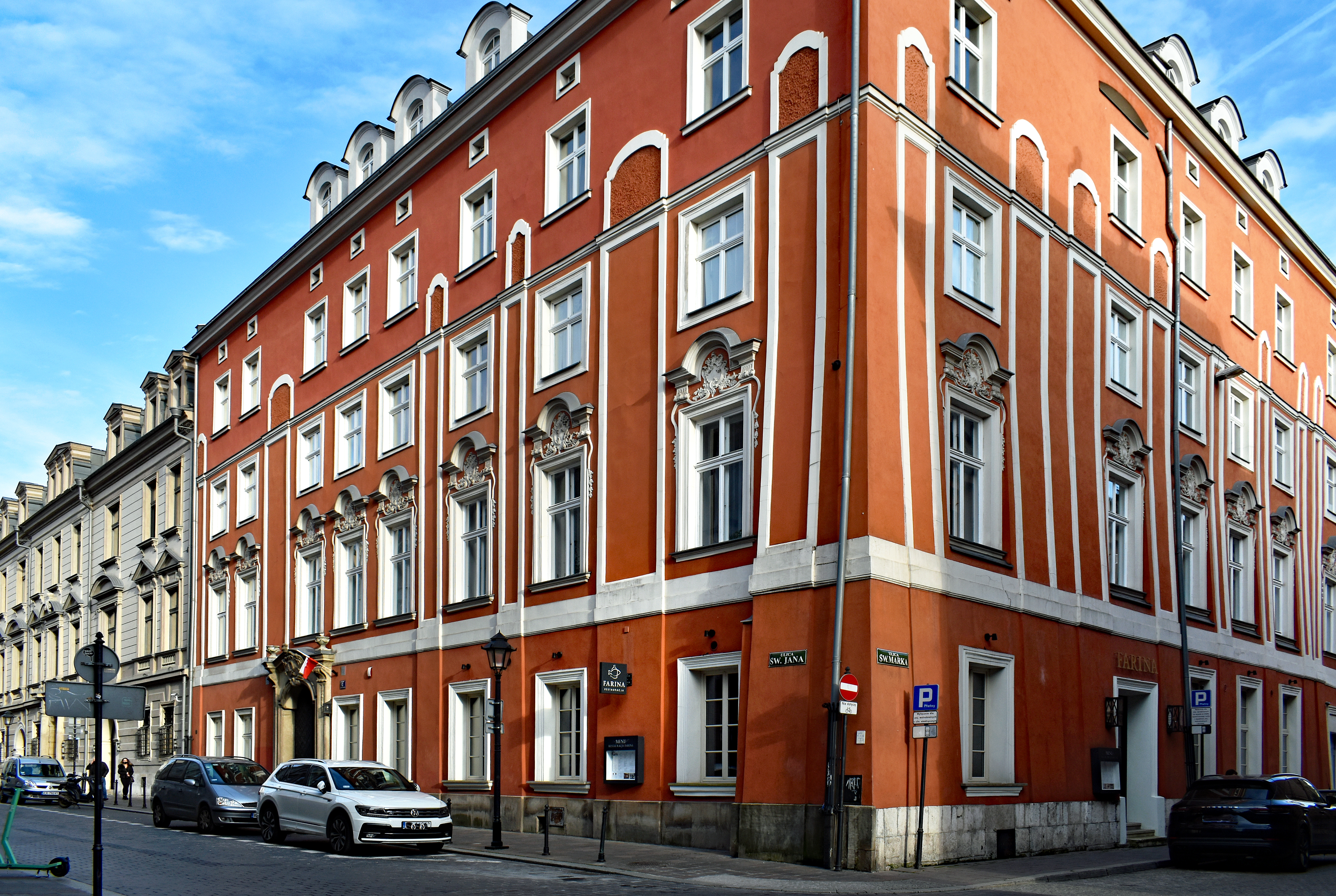
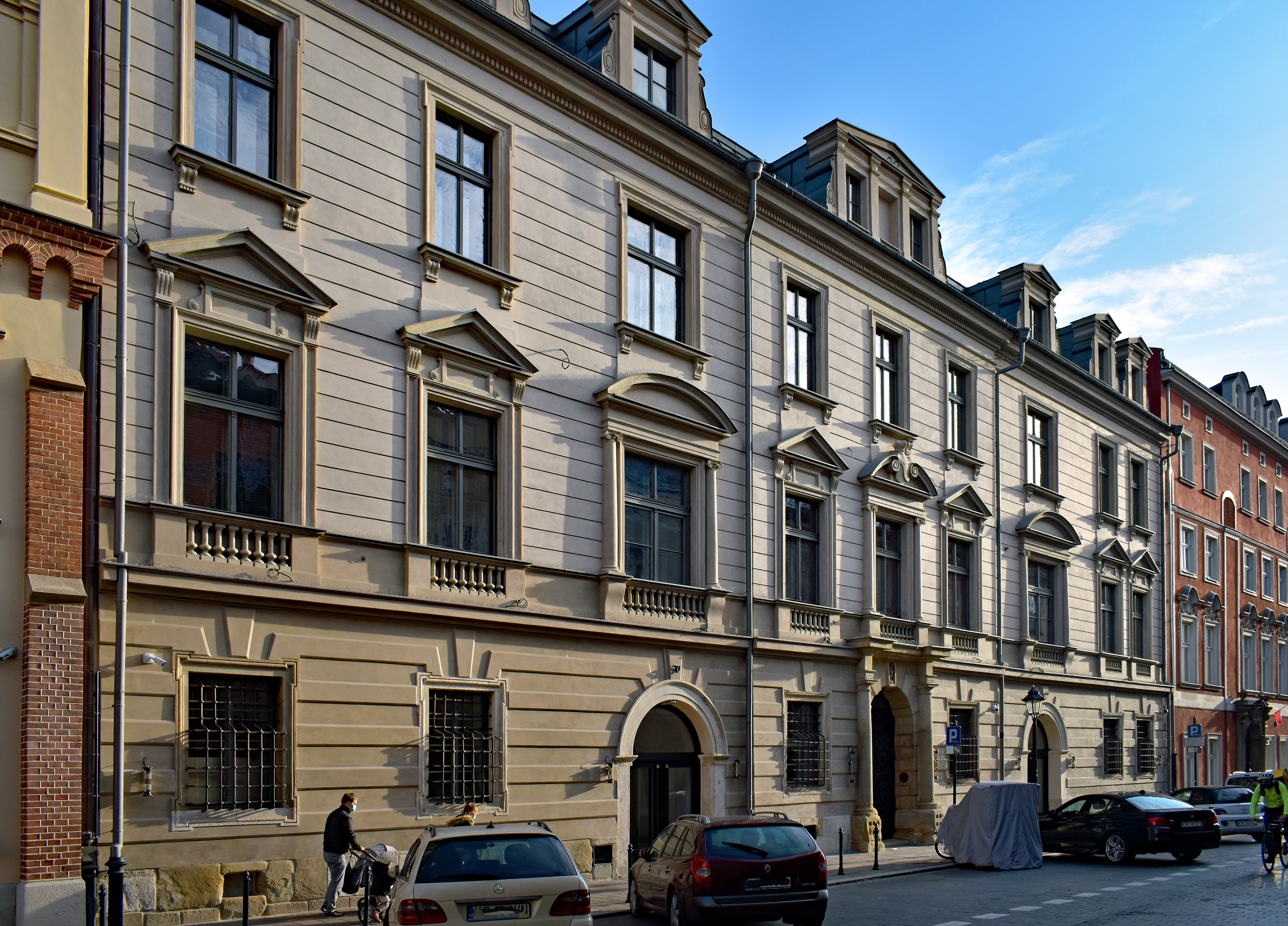
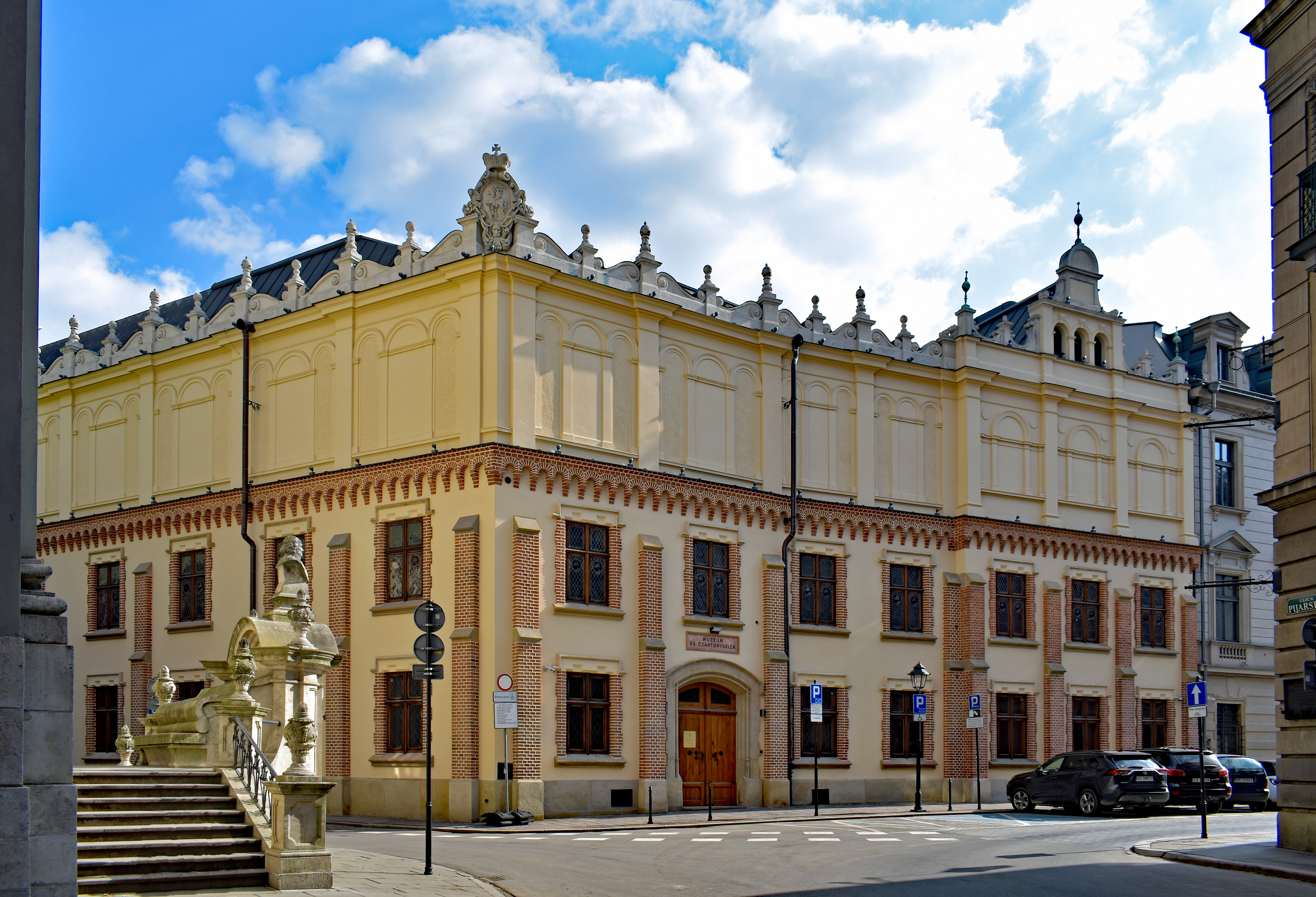
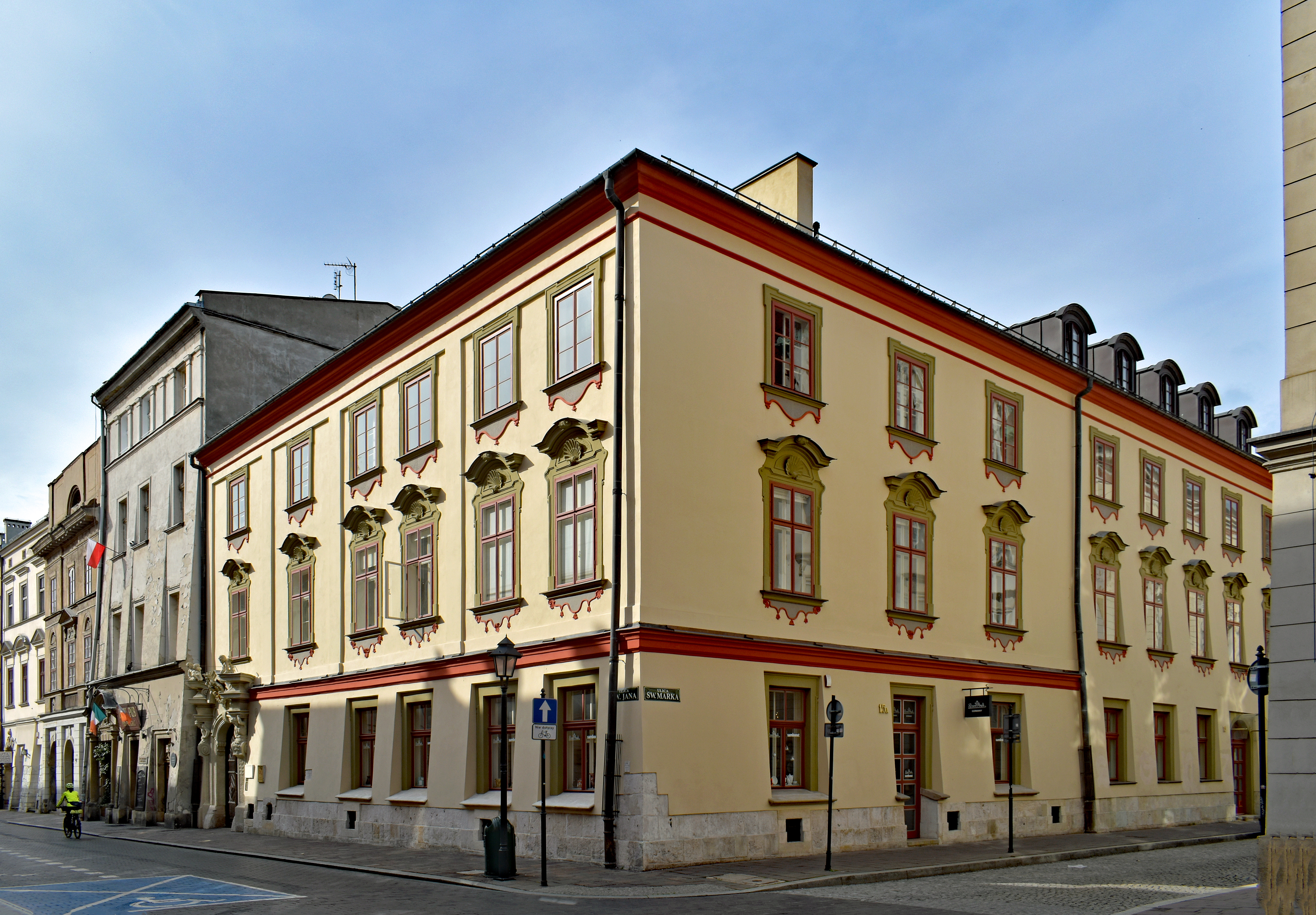
Street No.	Short description	Picture
1	Bonerowska Tenement House - built in the sixteenth century. The building is named after Jan Boner.
2	Feniks Tenement House - built between 1928 and 1932 in the art deco architectural style, designed by architect Adolf Szyszko-Bohusz. Presently, the building houses several businesses (ground floor) and apartments on its upper floors.
7	Church St. John the Baptist and St. John the Evangelist - a Roman Catholic church built in the twelfth century. The church is administered by the Prezentki female religious order.
11	Wodzicki Palace - constructed in the nineteenth century by adjoining two townhouses.
13	Przebendowski (Chwalibogowski) Palace - a historical palace built in the eighteenth-century according to architect Franciszek Placidi's designs. The late-Baroque portal contains the Nałęcz coat of arms, which the Przebendowski family.
15	Lubomirski Palace - a historic palace built in the nineteenth century.
17-19	Czartoryski Palace - the palace houses one of the oldest museums in Poland, opening in 1878. The museum's collections stem back from 1801, collected by Izabela Czartoryska, presented in her museum in Puławy.
20	Popiel (Kołłątajowski) Palace - the city palace, built around 1735 and 1744 designed by Francesco Placidi.
