= Andrzej Mleczko =

Polish illustrator (born 1949)

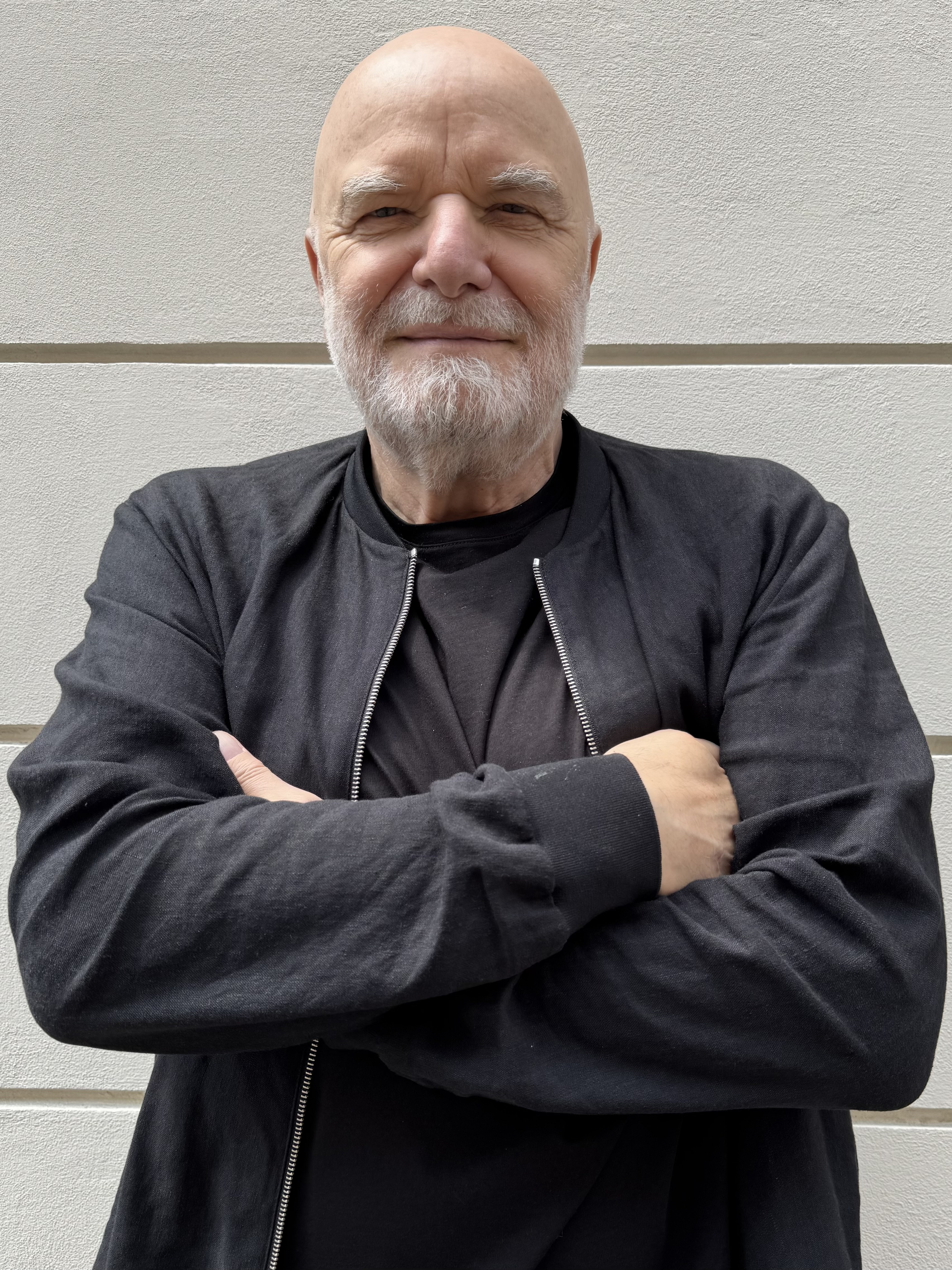
- Andrzej Mleczko in June 2025
- Born: Andrzej Mleczko; 5 January 1949 (age 77); Tarnobrzeg, Poland
- Known for: Satirical drawings

Andrzej Mleczko (born 5 January 1949) is a Polish illustrator, mostly known for his satirical activities. He is also connected with painting, book illustrations, adverts, scenography and posters. He has worked with Polish and foreign magazines, in which he has published more than 15,000 of his drawings.

He graduated from the Faculty of Architecture of Cracow University of Technology.

In 1982 in Kraków he opened his own art gallery at 14 św. Jana Street. He also opened his own gallery in 2002 in Warsaw.

In 2001 he co-hosted (with Paweł Pawlik) programme called Galeria Andrzeja Mleczki (Gallery of Andrzej Mleczko) on the radio station RMF FM . In 2003 he took part in Moja szkoła w Unii Europejskiej (My school in the European Union), a program promoting integration with the EU. He also received a Krakowska Książka Miesiąca (Cracovian Book of the Month) award in November 2008 for his book Seks, mydło i powidło.

He has made appearances in two of Olaf Lubaszenko's films: Chłopaki nie płaczą (Boys don't cry, 2000) and "E=mc²" (2002).

In 2021, he was awarded the honorary citizenship of Kraków.

Kraków Dragon trail, Dragon-Pilot in front of the terminal building at Kraków Balice International Airport, 2026 designed by Andrzej Mleczko and executed by sculptor Jan Tutaj.
