= Mleczko =

Mleczko ['mlɛt͡ʂ.kɔ] is a Polish surname. Mleczko is the diminutive of the Polish word for "milk" – mleko – and in a transferred sense is used to describe any whitish, viscous liquid. People with the name include:

- Allison Mleczko (born 1975), American ice hockey player
- Andrzej Mleczko (born 1949), Polish illustrator
- Miłosz Mleczko (born 1999), Polish footballer
- Wiktoryn Konstanty Mleczko (…–1679), Elder of Samogitia and Colonel of the Grand Ducal Lithuanian Army
