= Šventybrastis =

- Village
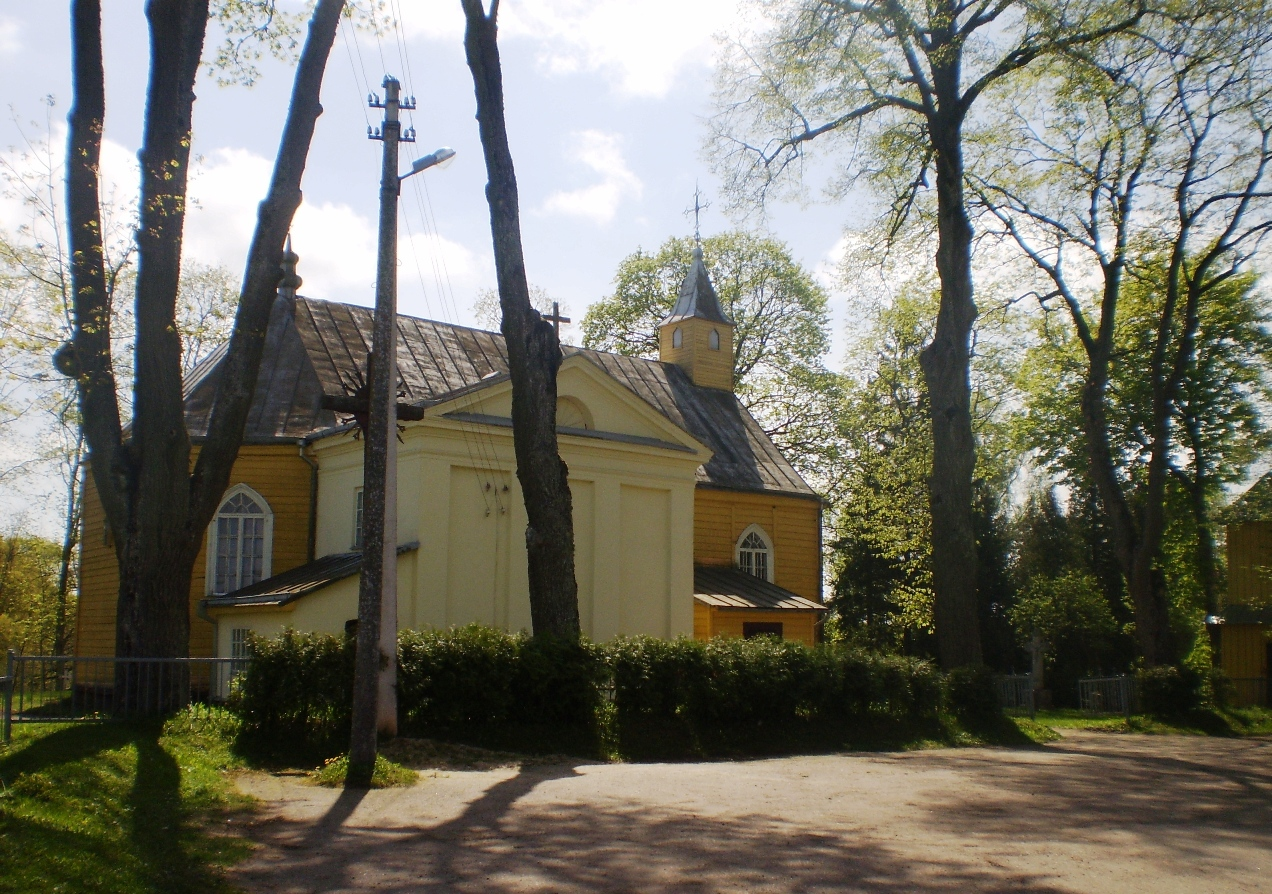

- Location in Lithuania Šventybrastis (Lithuania)
- Coordinates: 55°25′22″N 24°03′10″E
- Country: Lithuania
- County: Kaunas County
- Municipality: Kėdainiai district municipality
- Eldership: Vilainiai Eldership

Population (2011)
  - Total: 144
- Time zone: UTC+2 (EET)
  - Summer (DST): UTC+3 (EEST)

Šventybrastis ('sacred ford', formerly Russian: Свентобросць, Polish: Świętobrość) is a village in Kėdainiai district municipality, in Kaunas County, in central Lithuania. According to the 2011 census, the village has a population of 144 people. The village is located on the left bank of the Nevėžis river, by the Brasta rivulet. The village has a wooden church of the Transfiguration of Jesus (built in 1744), a monument for independence, four sacred oak trees (a nature monument), a cemetery, and a library. The Šventybrastis Landscape Sanctuary is located nearby, while the Lančiūnava-Šventybrastis Forest is some kilometres away from the village.

== History ==
From ancient times through the Christian Medieval period, Šventybrastis had a pagan shrine where eternal fire burnt. While most of the pagan holy groves were cut down during the era of Christian conversion, the Sacred Oaks at Šventybrastis are some of the few still standing from the pre-Christian era.

Šventybrastis once was a property of the Mleczko family but was transferred to the Zawisza family in the 17th century. In October 1863 the battle between the January Uprising rebels led by Antanas Mackevičius and Tsarist Army occurred in nearby Daniliškis village. 75 rebels were buried in Šventybrastis, by the Brasta rivulet.

Šventybrastis was a volost center but later it was transferred to Apytalaukis and then to Surviliškis. In 1919–1932 there was a school. During the early Soviet era it was a Nevėžis selsovet center.

== Demography ==
Historical population

Year	Pop.	±% p.a.
1902	63	—
1923	50	−1.09%
1959	61	+0.55%
1970	190	+10.88%
1979	232	+2.24%

Year	Pop.	±% p.a.
1987	240	+0.42%
1989	190	−11.02%
2001	169	−0.97%
2011	144	−1.59%

Source: 1902, 1923, 1959 & 1970, 1979, 1989, 2001, 2011

== Images ==
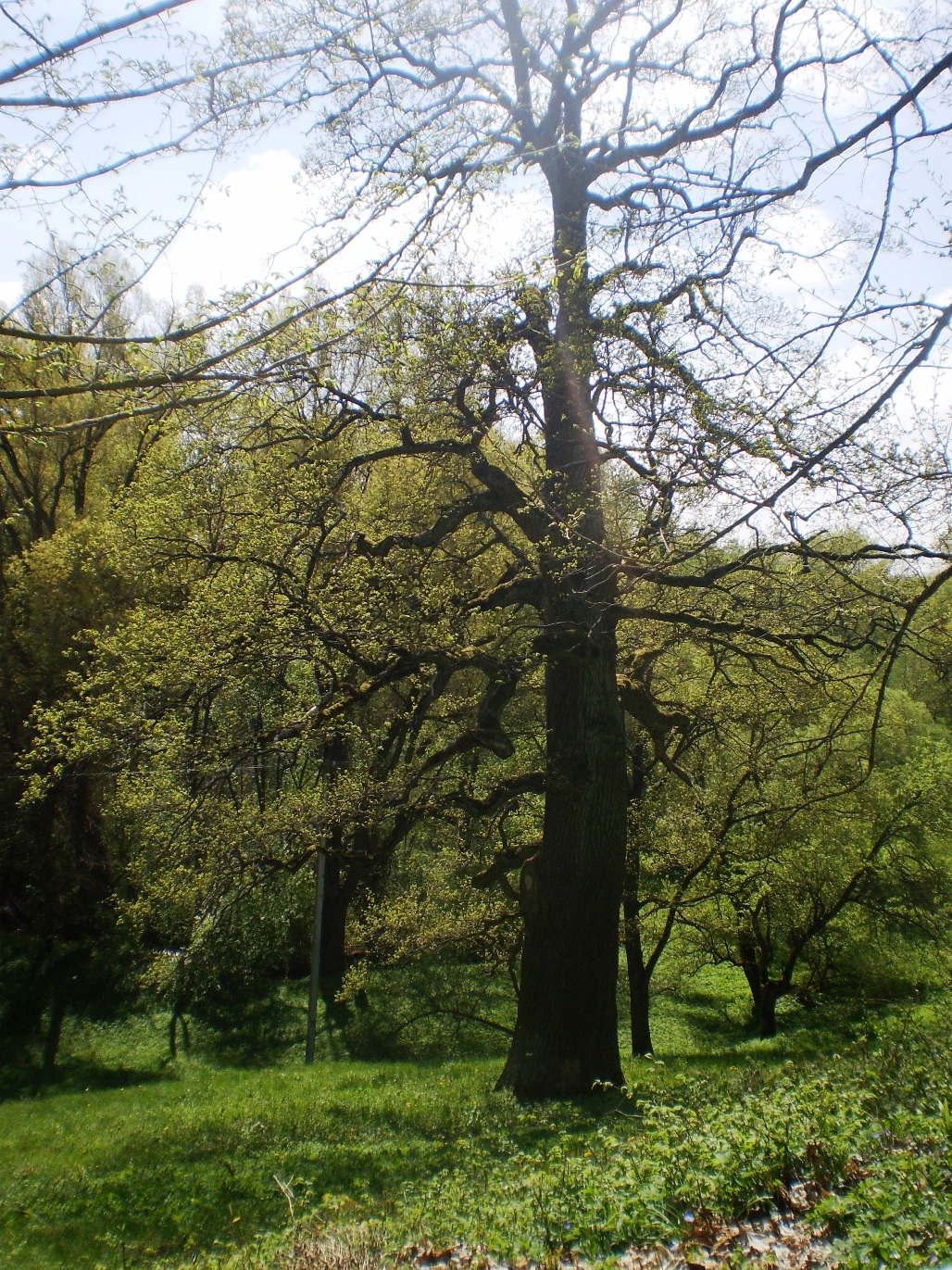
Sacred oaks

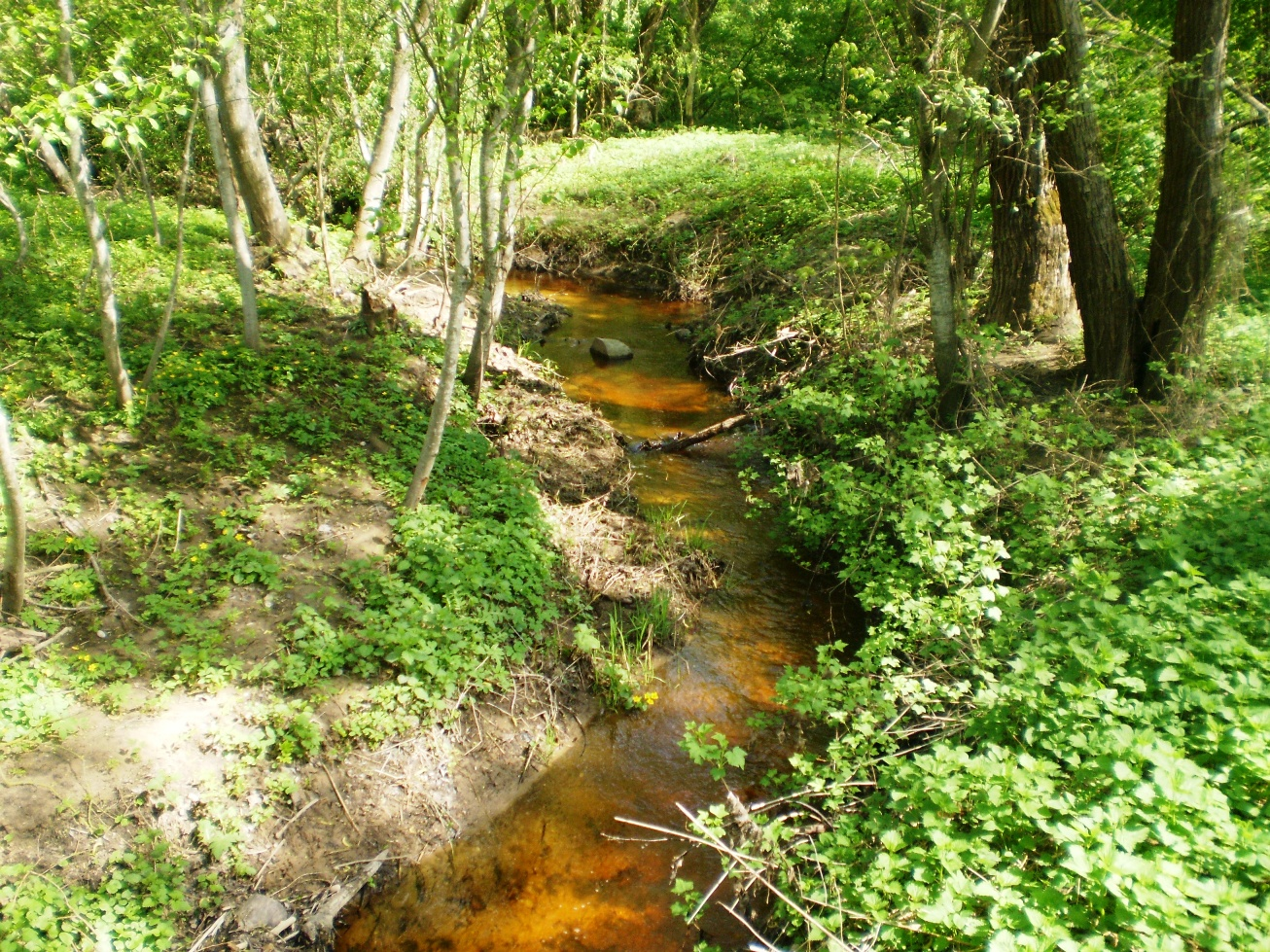
Brasta rivulet

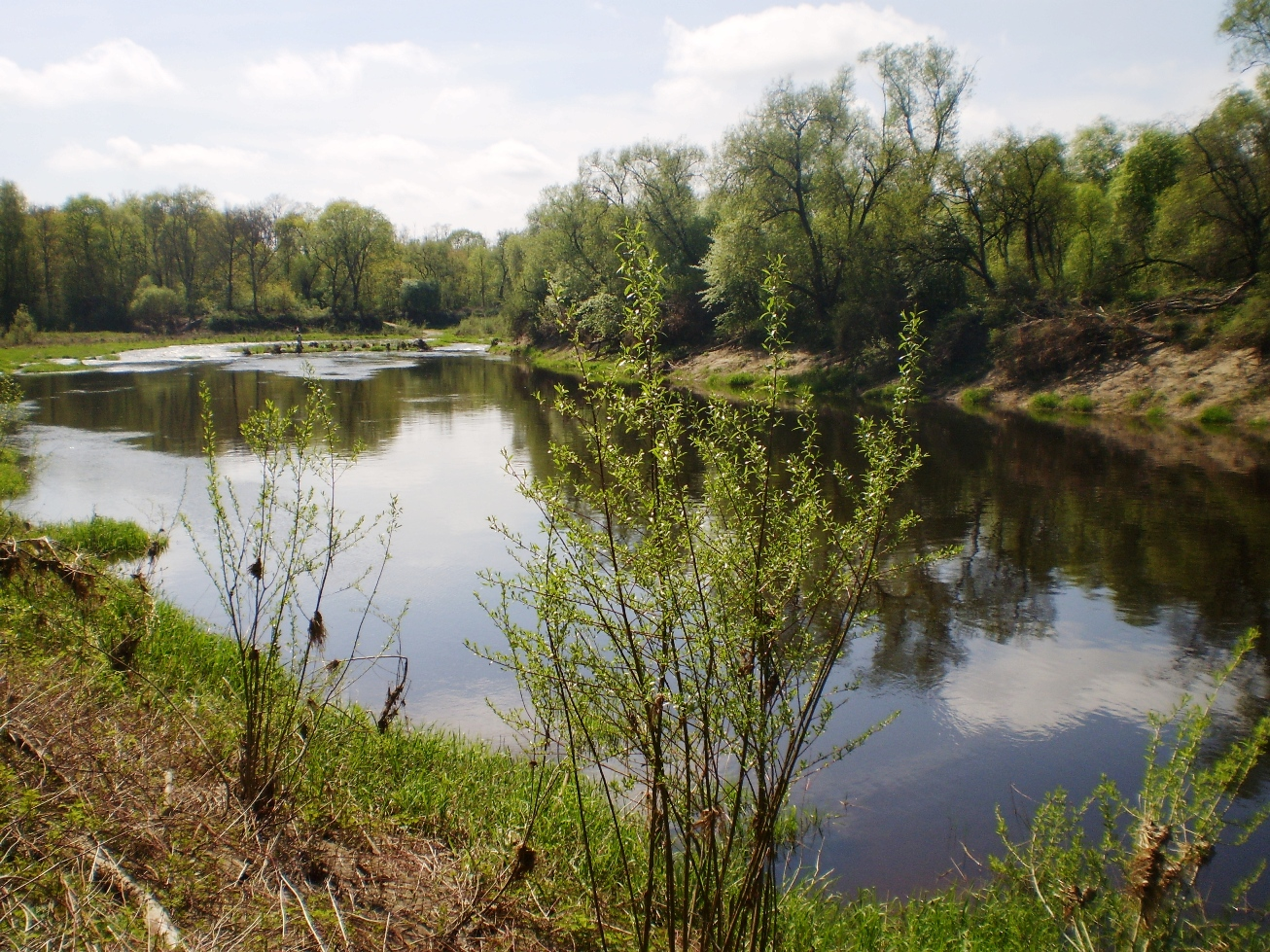
A ford in Nevėžis river next to Šventybrastis

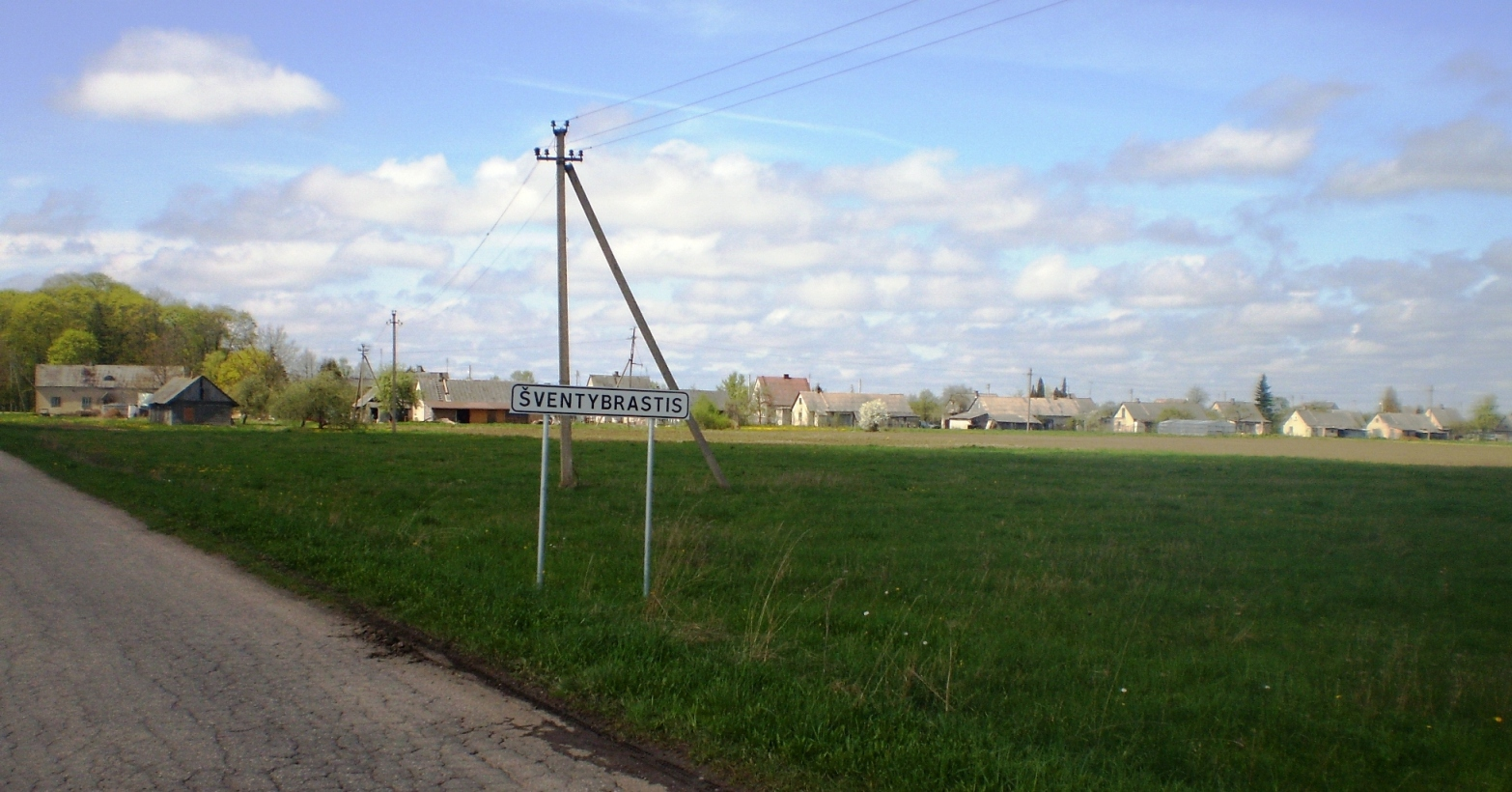
A roadsign
