= Church of St. John the Baptist and St. John the Evangelist, Kraków =

Roman Catholic church in Kraków, Poland

Church of St. John the Baptist and St. John the Evangelist
- Kościół św. Jana Chrzciciela i św. Jana Ewangelisty
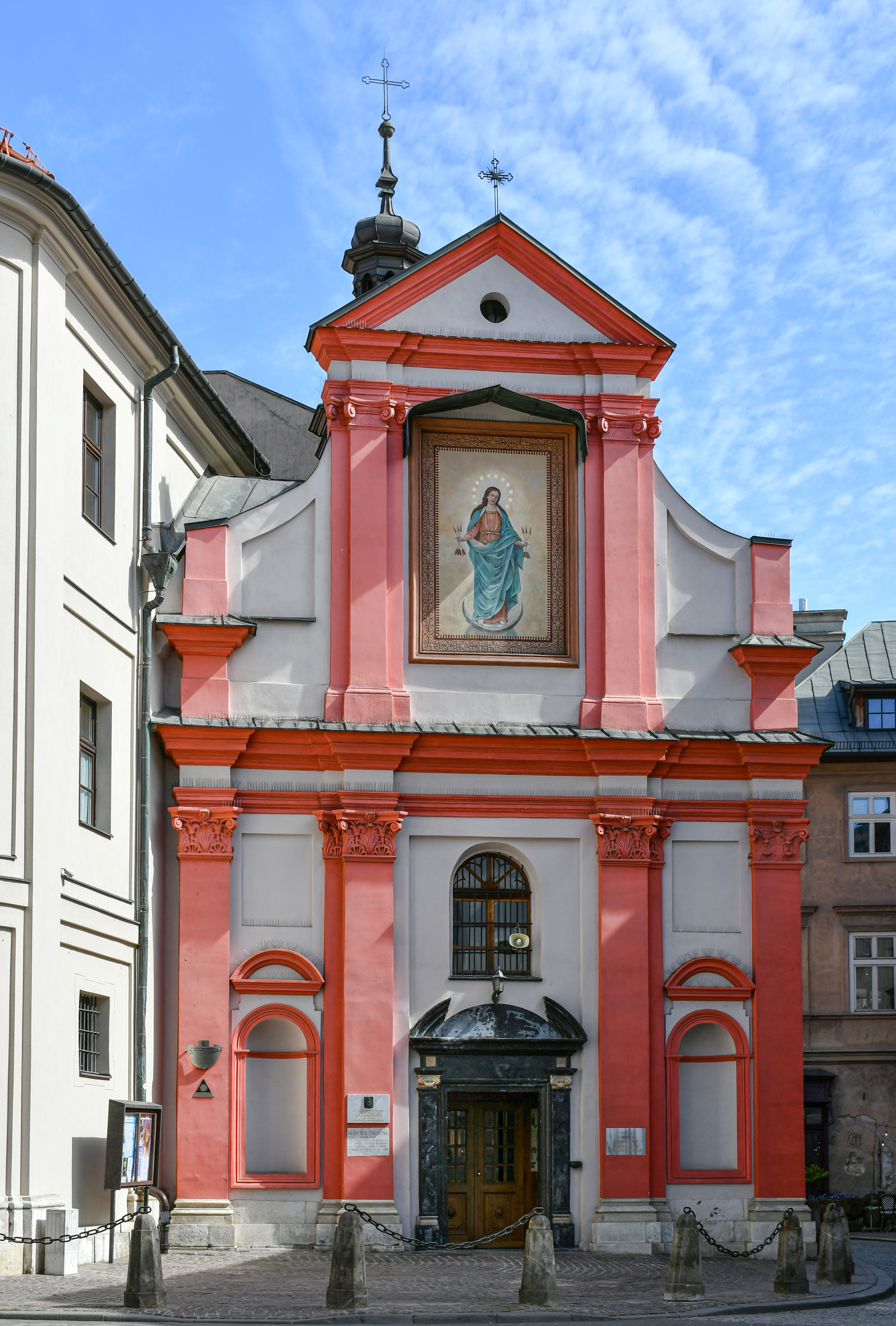
- The church façade with the painting of "Our Lady of Grace"
- Church of St. John the Baptist and St. John the Evangelist
- 50°03′47.3″N 19°56′20″E
- Location: Kraków
- Address: 7a św. Jana Street
- Country: Poland
- Denomination: Roman Catholic
- Website: https://siostryprezentki.pl/

UNESCO World Heritage Site
- Type: Cultural
- Criteria: iv
- Designated: 1978
- Part of: Historic Centre of Kraków
- Reference no.: 29
- Region: Europe and North America

Historic Monument of Poland
- Designated: 1994-09-08
- Part of: Kraków historical city complex
- Reference no.: M.P. 1994 nr 50 poz. 418

The Church of St. John the Baptist and St. John the Evangelist (Polish: Kościół św. Jana Chrzciciela i św. Jana Ewangelisty) known colloquially as the Presentation Sisters Church (Polish: Kościół prezentek) is a historic Roman Catholic conventual church of the Presentation Sisters located at 7a św. Jana Street in the Old Town of Kraków, Poland.

Founded by Piotr Włostowic in the 12th century. It has a late Baroque interior. The altar contains a 16th-century painting of "Our Lady of the Redemption of Slaves".

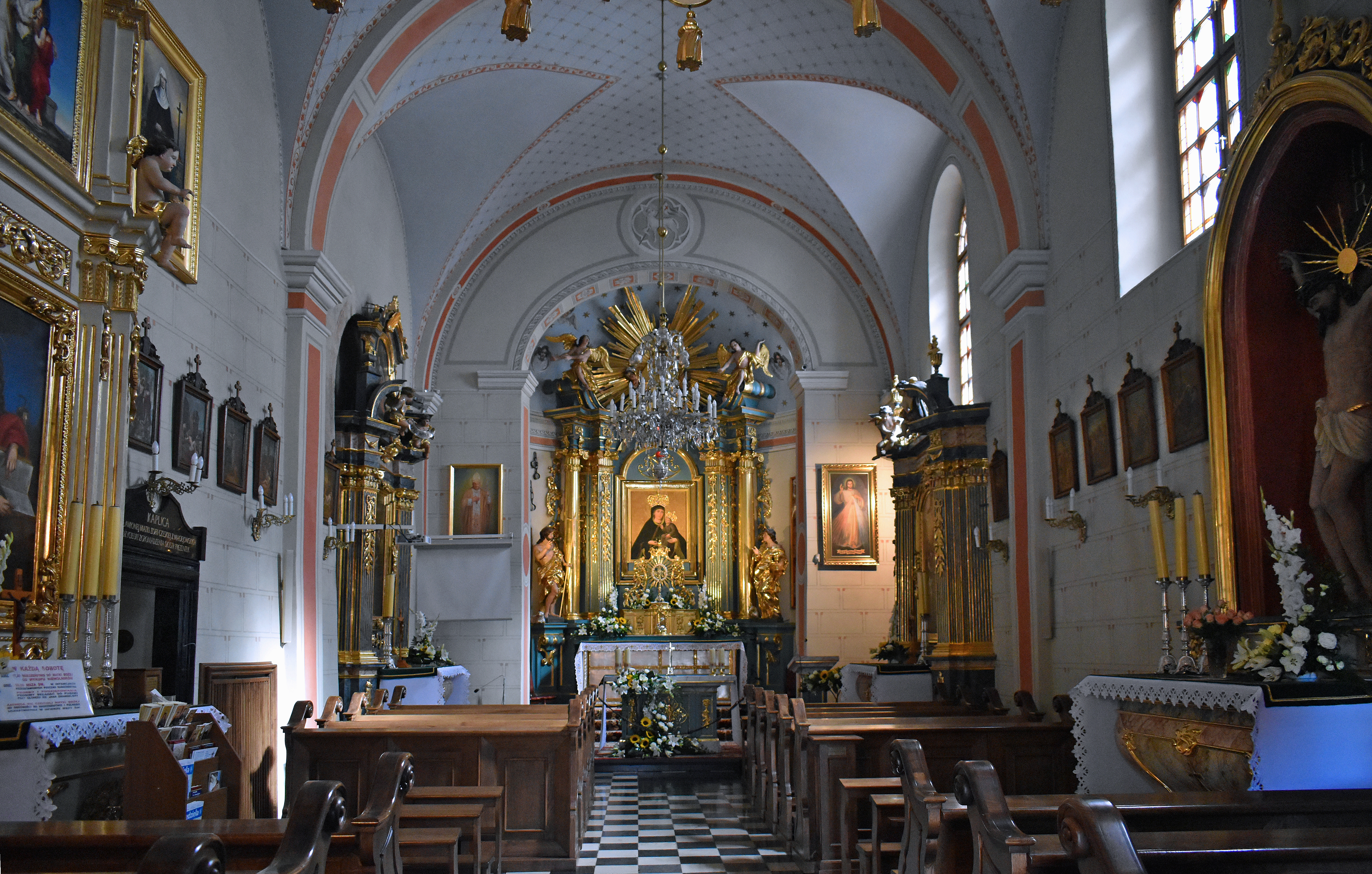
Interior of the church

== Bibliography ==
- (in Polish) * Michał Rożek, Barbara Gądkowa Leksykon kościołów Krakowa, Wydawnictwo Verso, Kraków 2003, ISBN 83-919281-0-1 page 59-60 (Lexicon of Krakow churches)
- (in Polish) * Praca zbiorowa Encyklopedia Krakowa, wydawca Biblioteka Kraków i Muzeum Krakowa, Kraków 2023, ISBN 978-83-66253-46-9 volume I page 745 (Encyclopedia of Krakow)
