= Church of the Transfiguration, Kraków =

Roman Catholic church in Krakow, Poland

Church of the Transfiguration and the Protection of Our Lady Queen of Poland
- Kościół Przemienienia Pańskiego i Opieki Matki Boskiej Królowej Polski
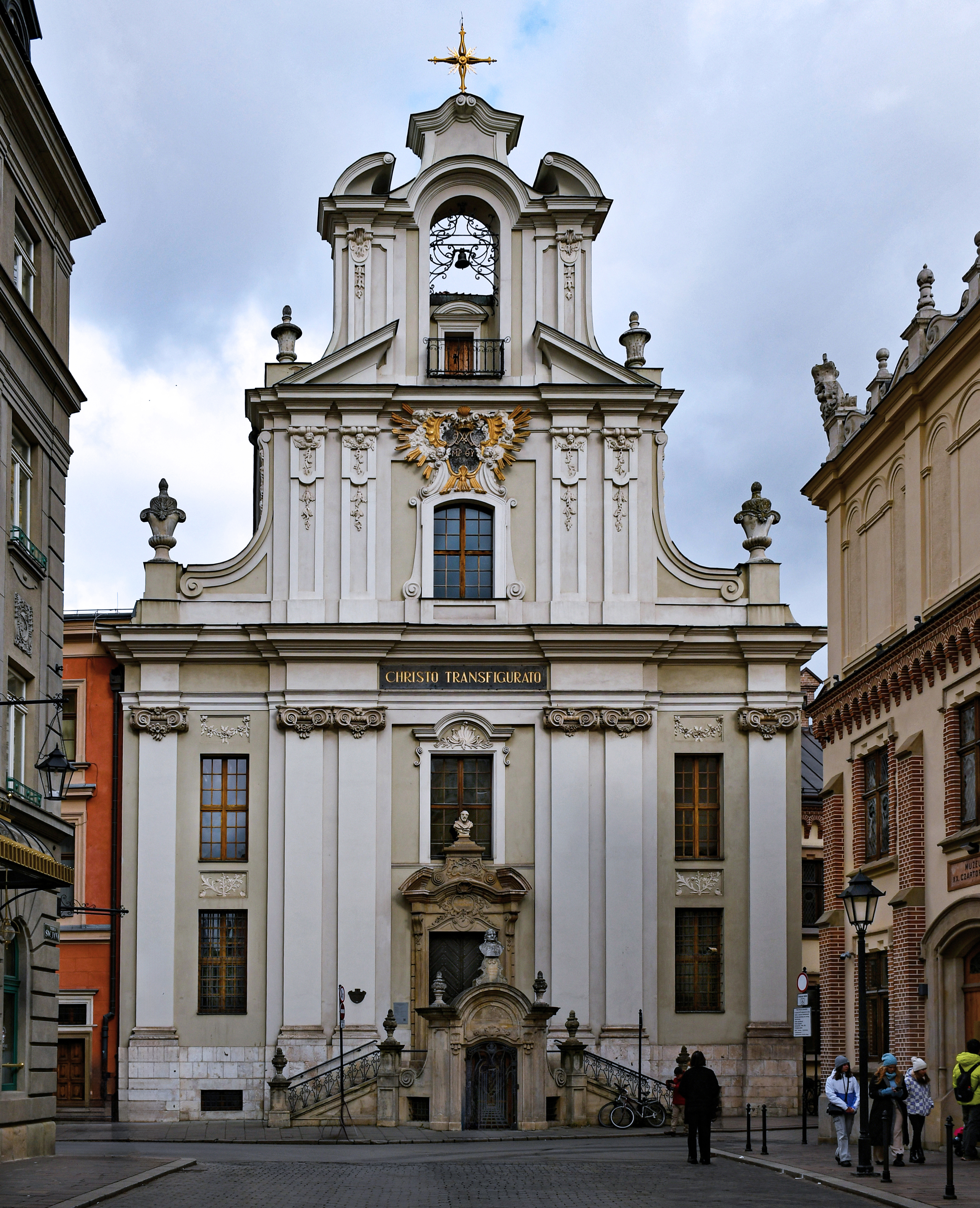
- View from the south
- Church of the Transfiguration and the Protection of Our Lady Queen of Poland
- 50°03′53.8″N 19°56′23.6″E
- Location: Kraków
- Address: 4 Pijarska Street
- Country: Poland
- Denomination: Roman Catholic
- Website: https://pijarska.pijarzy.pl/

UNESCO World Heritage Site
- Type: Cultural
- Criteria: iv
- Designated: 1978
- Part of: Historic Centre of Kraków
- Reference no.: 29
- Region: Europe and North America

Historic Monument of Poland
- Designated: 1994-09-08
- Part of: Kraków historical city complex
- Reference no.: M.P. 1994 nr 50 poz. 418

The Church of the Transfiguration and the Protection of Our Lady Queen of Poland (Polish: Kościół Przemienienia Pańskiego i Opieki Matki Boskiej Królowej Polski) colloquially the Piarist Church (Polish: Kościół pijarów) and Transfiguration Church (Polish: Kościół Przemienienia Pańskiego) is a Roman Catholic Piarist conventual church located at 4 Pijarska Street in the Old Town of Kraków, Poland.

It was founded by the Piarist Order, and built between 1718 and 1728 by Kacper Bażanka. The façade designed by Francesco Placidi was built between 1759 and 1761. Illusionistic decorations of the vault over the nave date back to the 18th century. The fresco are the work of artists from Moravia: Franz Gregor Ignaz Eckstein and Joseph Piltz.

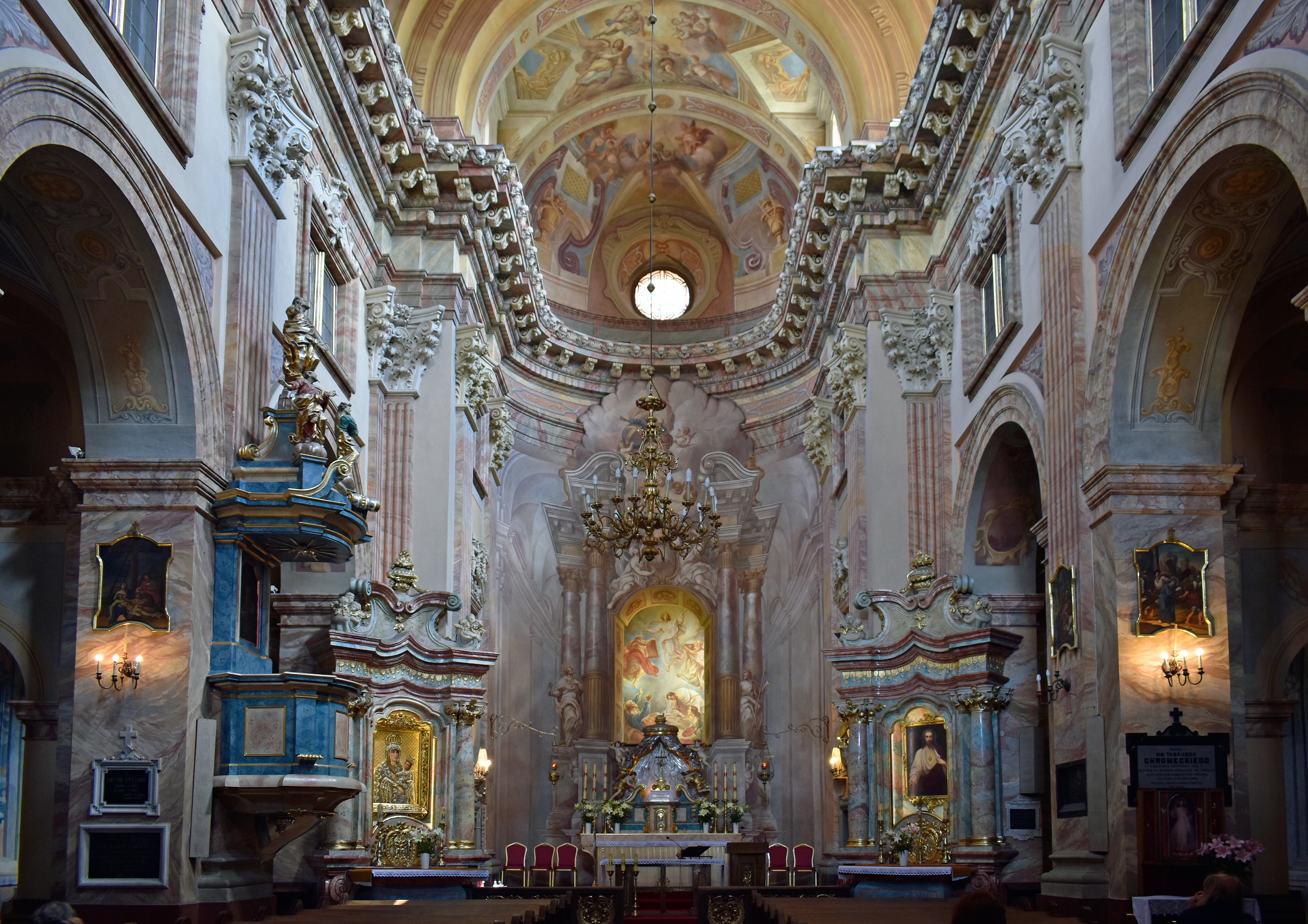
Nave

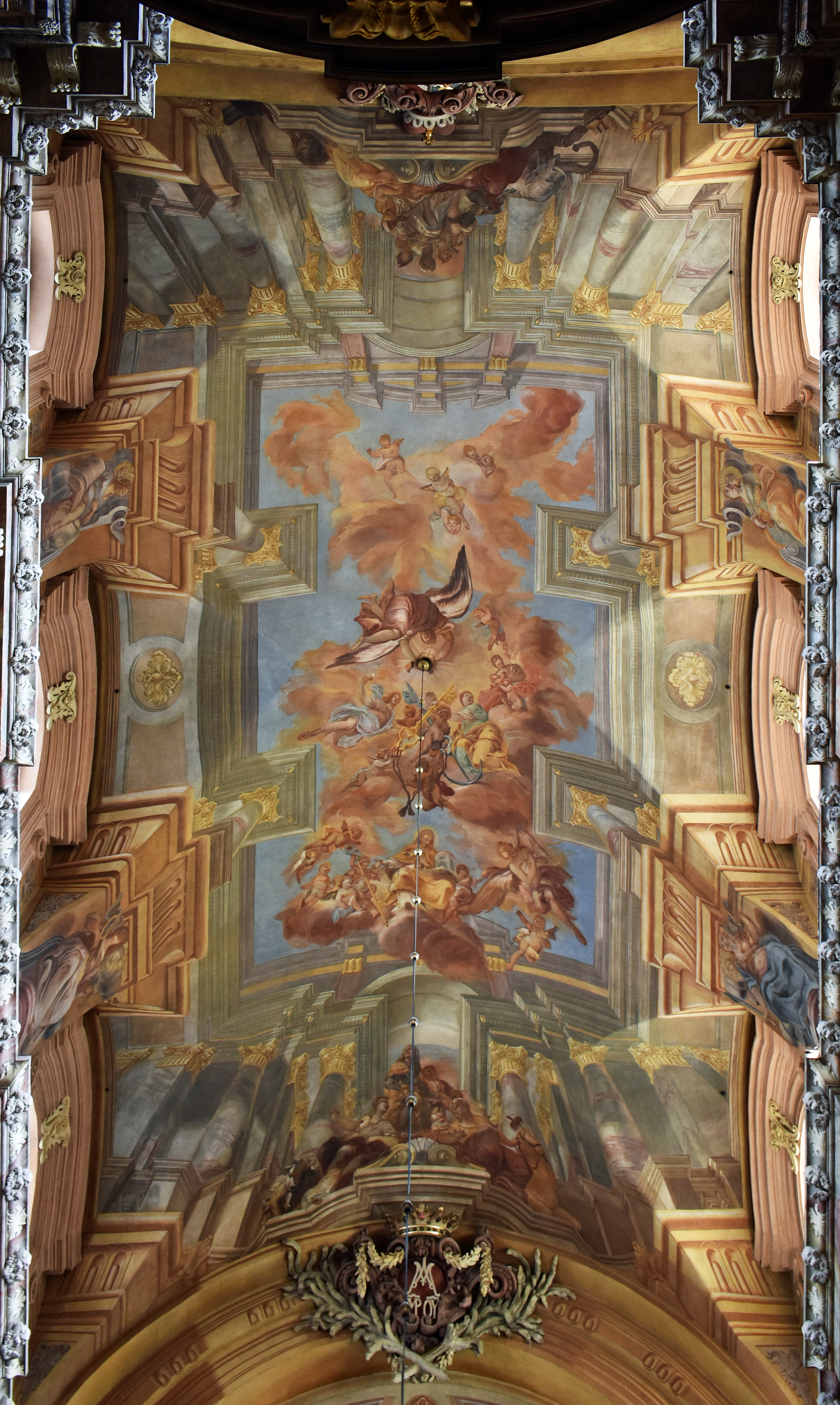
Vault

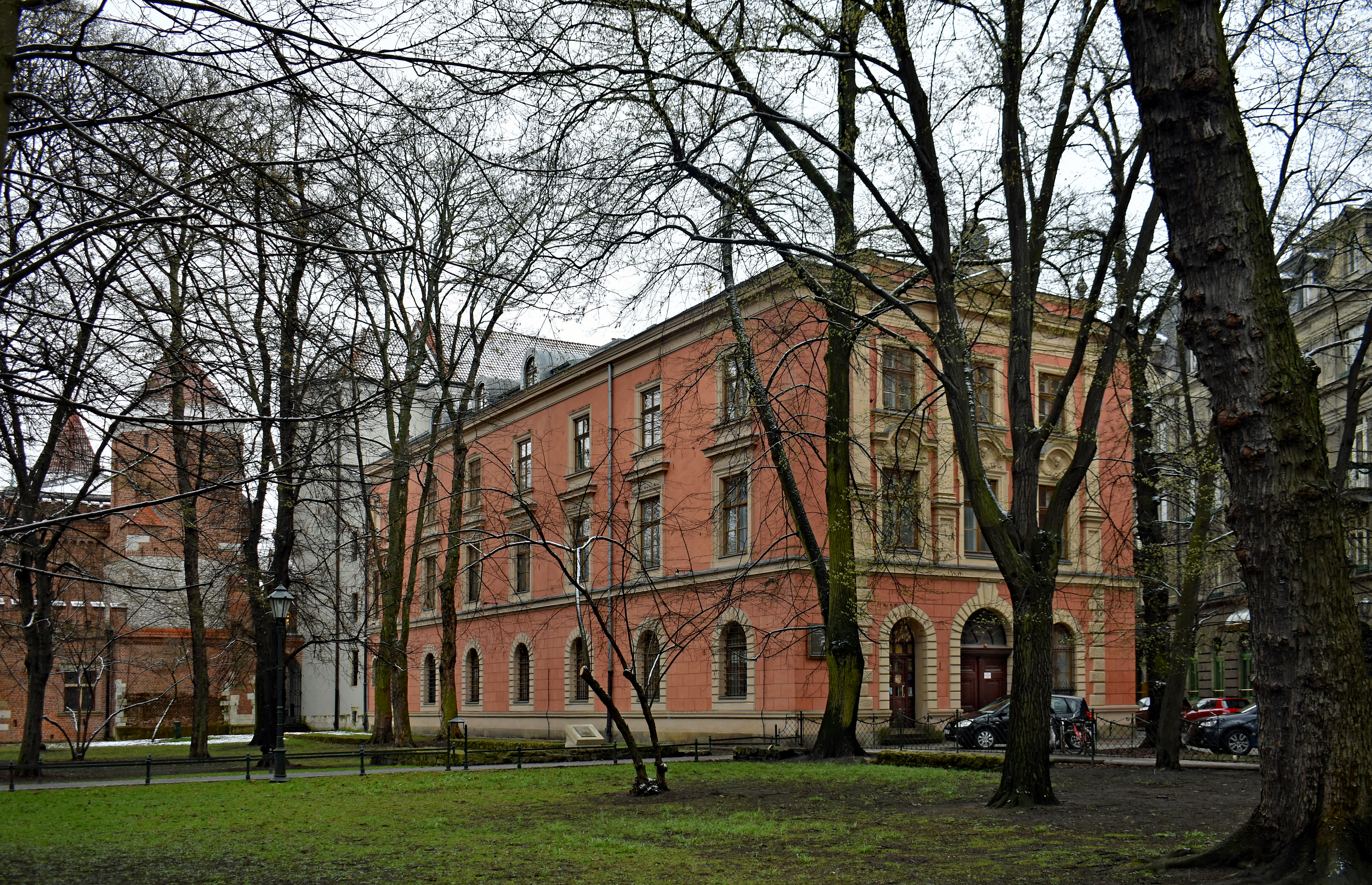
2 Pijarska Street
Piarist Convent

== Bibliography ==
- (in Polish) Michał Rożek, Barbara Gądkowa Leksykon kościołów Krakowa, Wydawnictwo Verso, Kraków 2003, ISBN 83-919281-0-1 page 158 (Lexicon of Krakow churches)
- (in Polish) Praca zbiorowa Encyklopedia Krakowa, wydawca Biblioteka Kraków i Muzeum Krakowa, Kraków 2023, ISBN 978-83-66253-46-9 volume I page 736-737 (Encyclopedia of Krakow)
