= Židovice (Jičín District) =

- Municipality
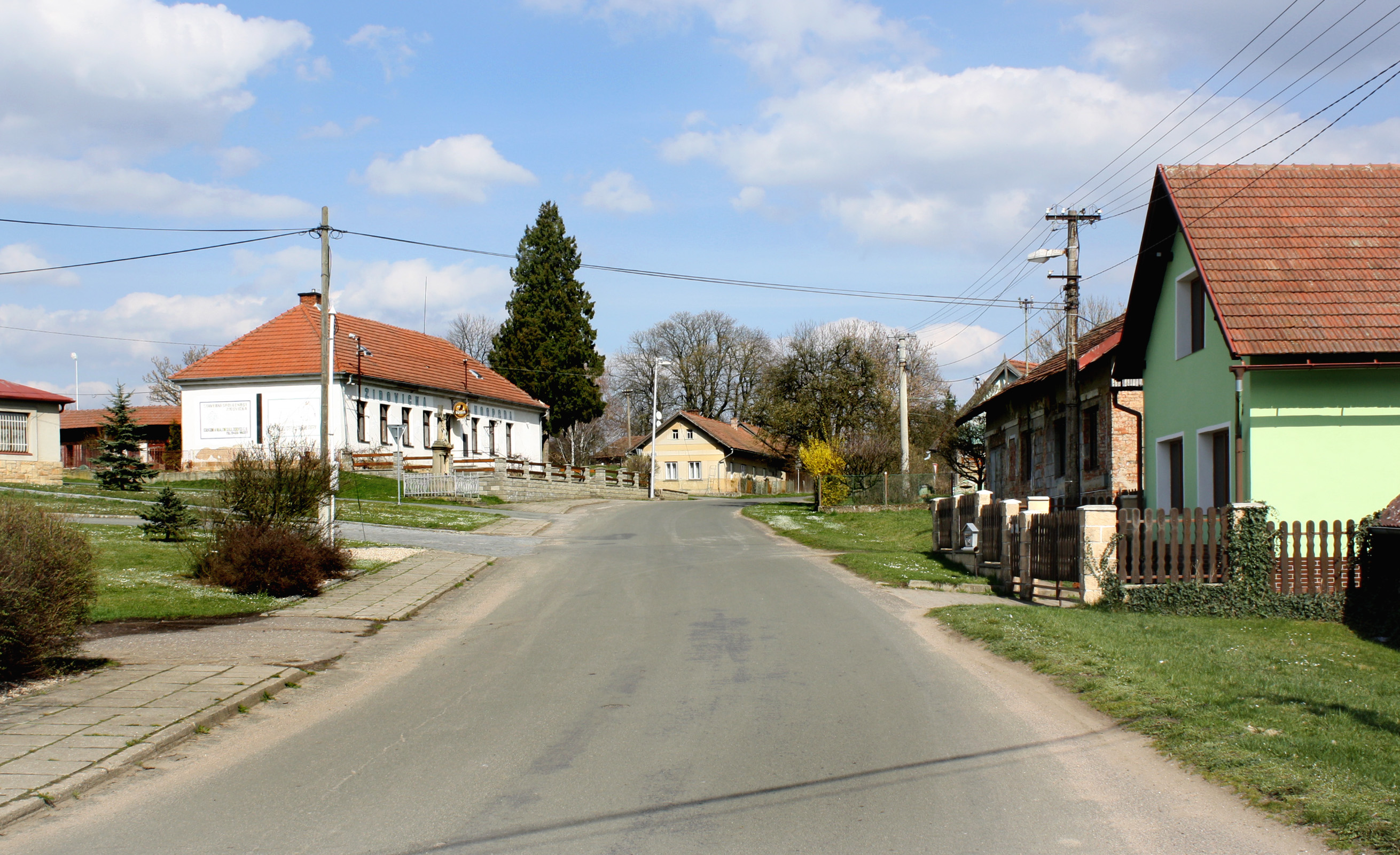
- Eastern part of Židovice

- Location in the Czech Republic
- Coordinates: 50°17′44″N 15°19′14″E
- Country: Czech Republic
- Region: Hradec Králové
- District: Jičín
- First mentioned: 1361

Area
  - Total: 3.33 km^{2} (1.29 sq mi)
- Elevation: 237 m (778 ft)

Population (2026-01-01)
  - Total: 101
  - Density: 30.3/km^{2} (78.6/sq mi)
- Time zone: UTC+1 (CET)
  - Summer (DST): UTC+2 (CEST)
- Postal code: 507 32
- Website: www.obeczidovice.cz

Židovice is a municipality and village in Jičín District in the Hradec Králové Region of the Czech Republic. It has about 100 inhabitants.

== Geography ==
Židovice is located about 15 kilometres (9 mi) south of Jičín and 61 km (38 mi) northeast of Prague. It lies in the Central Elbe Table. The highest point is at 265 m (869 ft) above sea level.

== Demographics ==
Historical population
| Year | Pop. | ±% |
|---|---|---|
| 1869 | 287 | — |
| 1880 | 280 | −2.4% |
| 1890 | 253 | −9.6% |
| 1900 | 293 | +15.8% |
| 1910 | 300 | +2.4% |
| 1921 | 272 | −9.3% |
| 1930 | 296 | +8.8% |
| 1950 | 217 | −26.7% |
| 1961 | 220 | +1.4% |
| 1970 | 194 | −11.8% |
| 1980 | 159 | −18.0% |
| 1991 | 126 | −20.8% |
| 2001 | 131 | +4.0% |
| 2011 | 112 | −14.5% |
| 2021 | 95 | −15.2% |
Source: Censuses
