= Franz Gregor Ignaz Eckstein =

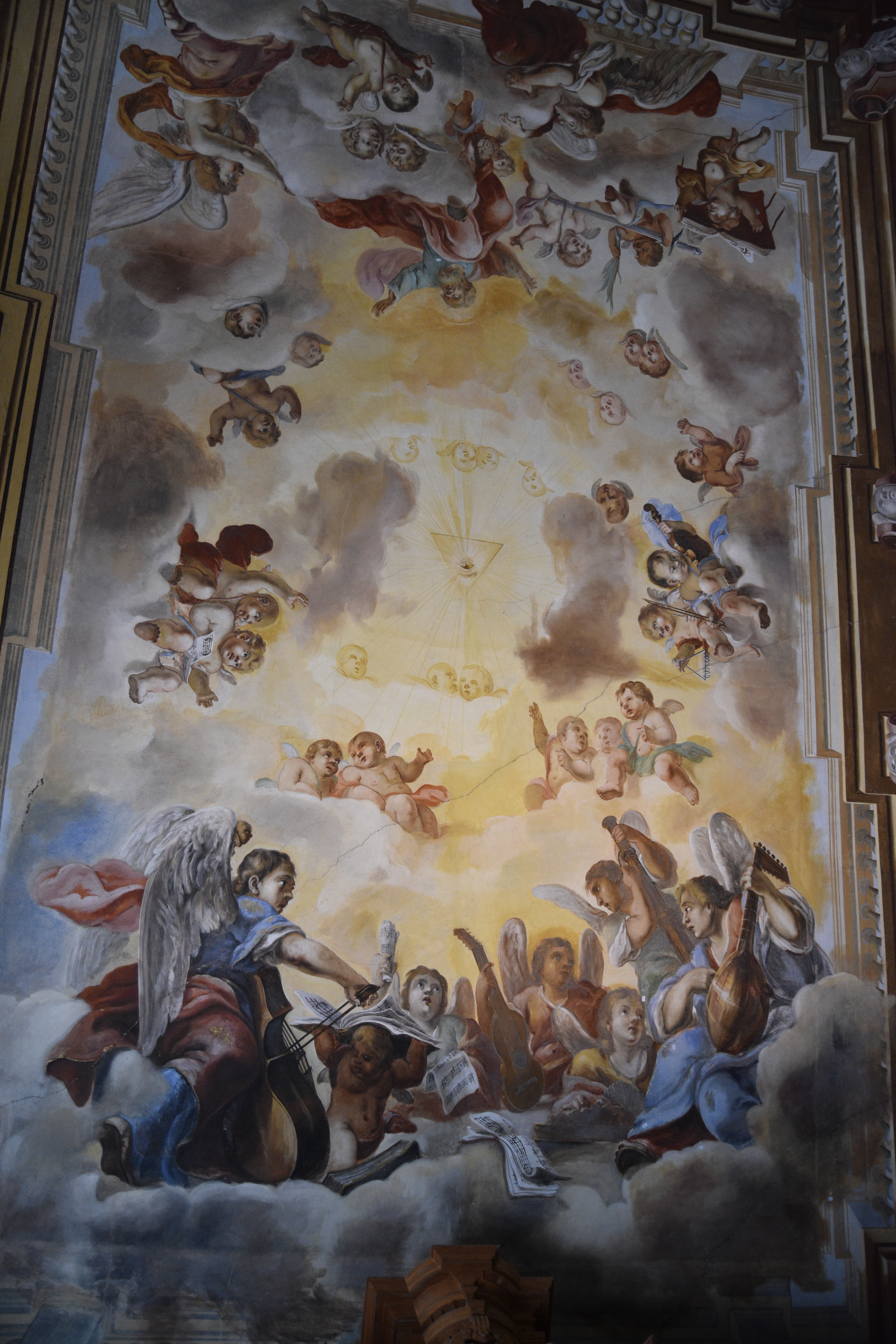
Ceiling of the Chapel; Bernstein Castle

Franz Gregor Ignaz Eckstein (Czech: František Řehoř Ignác Eckstein, Polish: Franciszek Grzegorz Ignacy Eckstein) (c. 1689 – 1741) was an Austrian fresco painter of Czech ancestry. He worked in Bohemia, Silesia, and Galicia.

== Life and work ==
Eckstein was born in c. 1689 in Židovice (today part of Libčeves, Czech Republic). Before 1709, he was a student of Michael Wenzel Halbax. He may also have studied in Rome. His first frescoes were modelled on the complex works of the Italian master, Andrea Pozzo. In addition to frescoes, he painted altarpieces.

In 1711, he was married in Brno, where he took up residence, although he accepted commissions from many other places, and travelled frequently. From 1727 to 1733, he lived and worked in Kraków. His final two years were spent in Lemberg, where he died in 1741.

His most important works include frescoes in the Loretokapelle of the Minorite monastery in Brno, Milotitz Castle, Bernstein Castle, the Piarist Church in Kraków, and the Jesuit church in Lemberg.

The painter and engraver Gottfried Bernhard Göz was one of his best known students.

== Sources ==
- Anna Lewicka-Morawska, Marek Machowski, Maria Anna Rudzka: Słownik malarzy polskich. Warsaw, Wydawnictwo Arkady, 2003, ISBN 83-213-3856-9
- Helena Lukešová: František Řehoř Ignác Eckstein (1689?–1741), K východiskům jeho freskařsé tvorby, Master's thesis, Brno, 2009 (Online)
