= Židovice (Litoměřice District) =

- Municipality
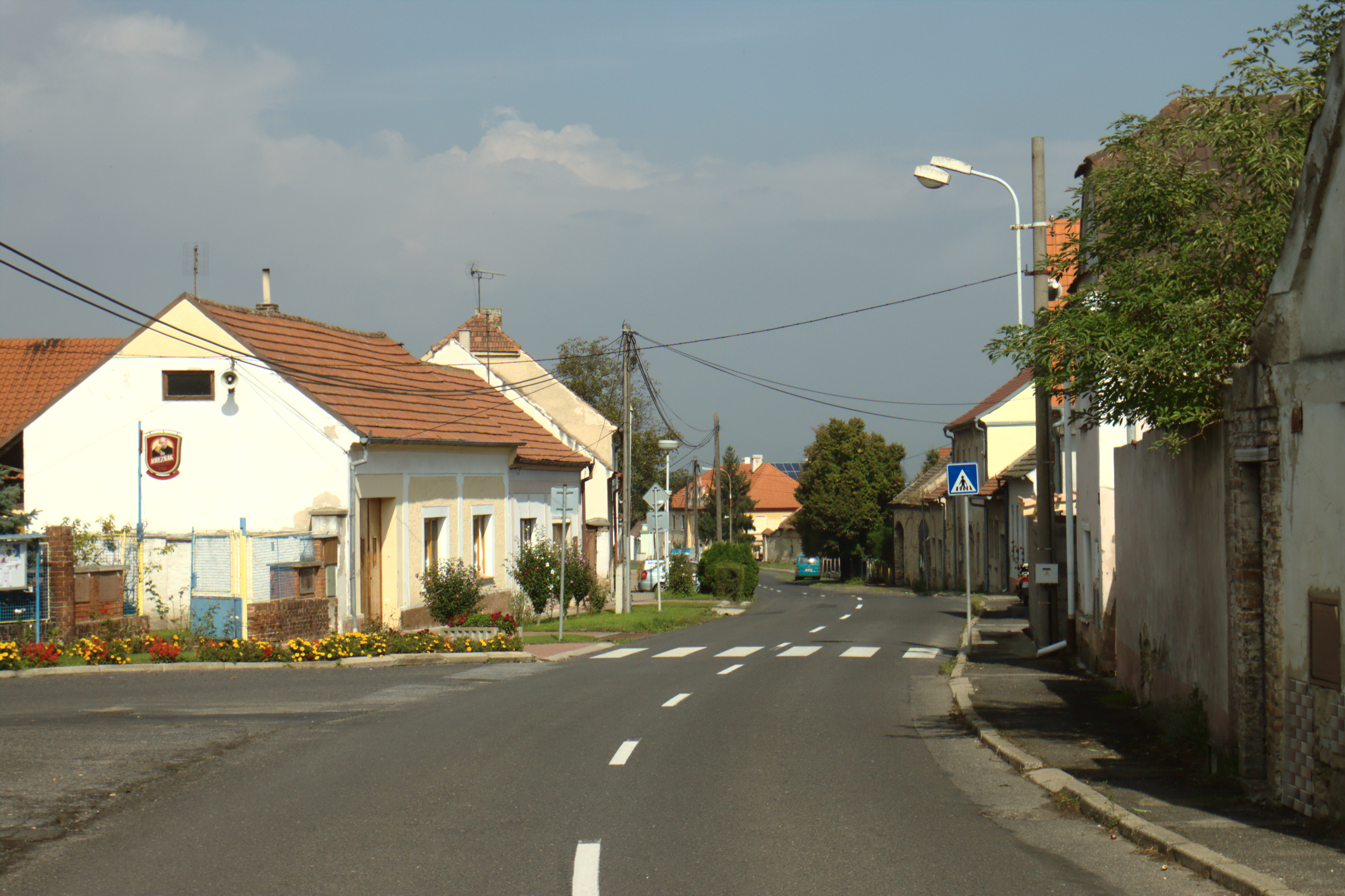
- Main road

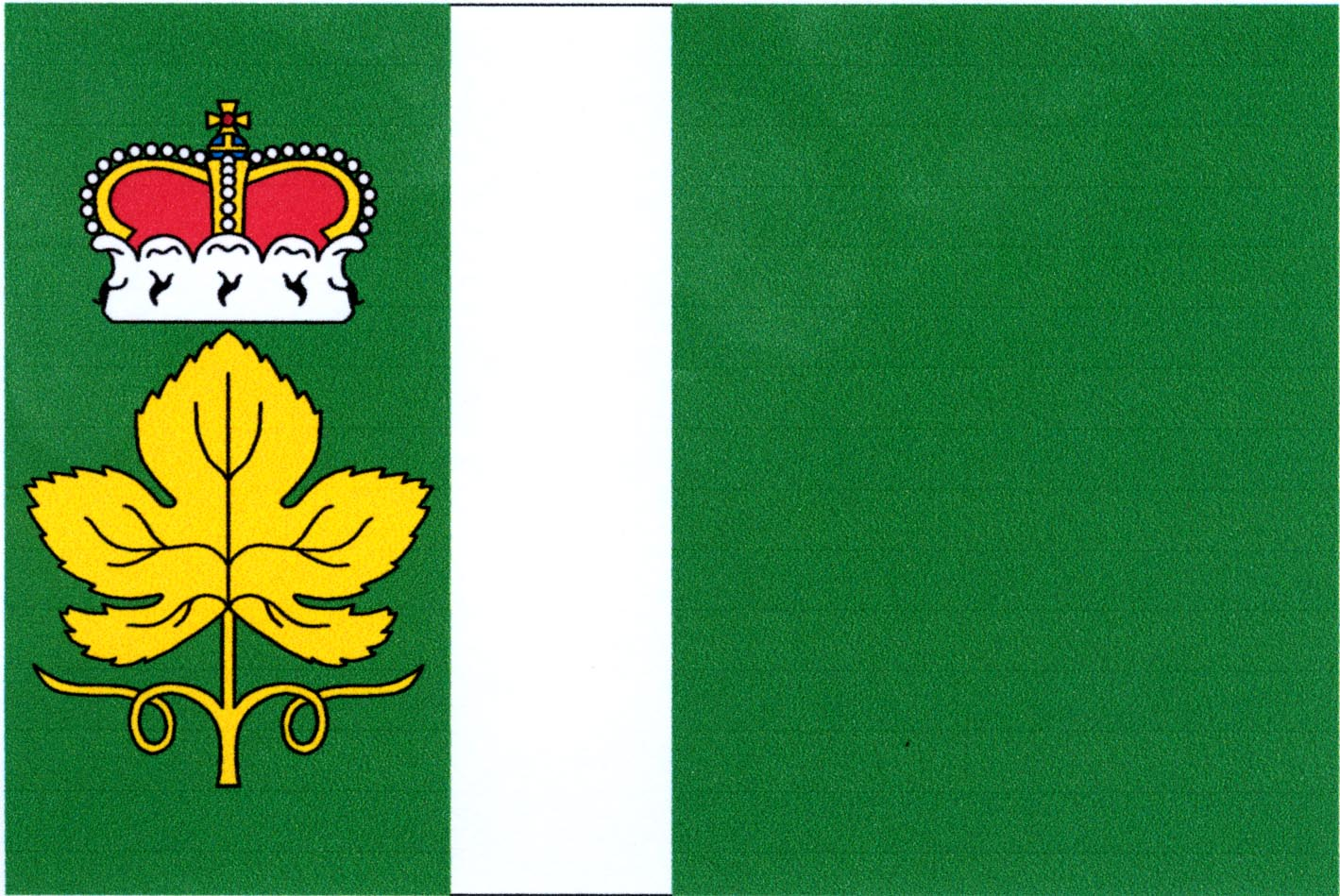
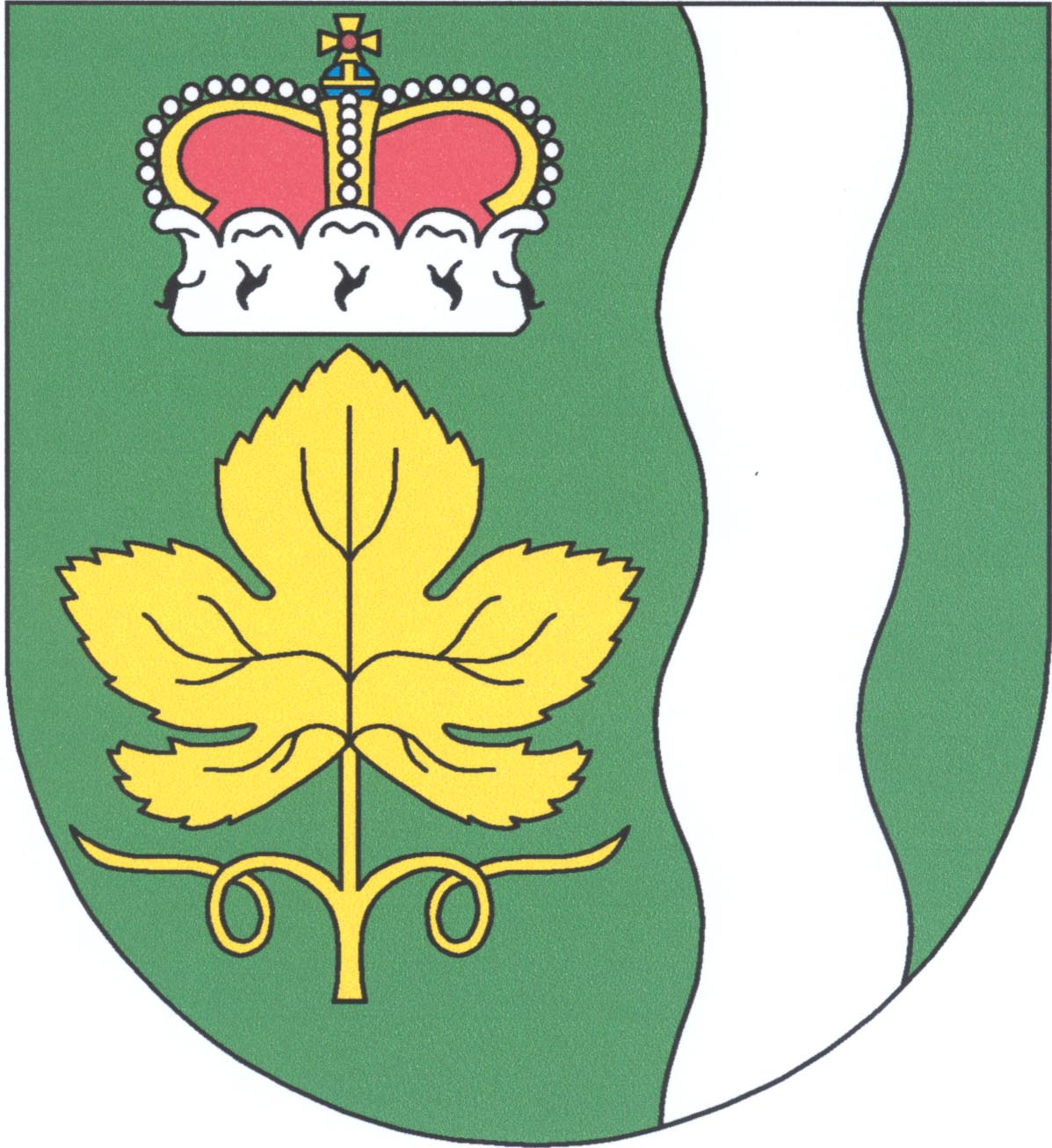
- Flag Coat of arms

- Location in the Czech Republic
- Coordinates: 50°26′47″N 14°13′59″E
- Country: Czech Republic
- Region: Ústí nad Labem
- District: Litoměřice
- First mentioned: 1390

Area
  - Total: 3.56 km^{2} (1.37 sq mi)
- Elevation: 156 m (512 ft)

Population (2026-01-01)
  - Total: 385
  - Density: 108/km^{2} (280/sq mi)
- Time zone: UTC+1 (CET)
  - Summer (DST): UTC+2 (CEST)
- Postal code: 411 83
- Website: www.zidovice.cz

Židovice is a municipality and village in Litoměřice District in the Ústí nad Labem Region of the Czech Republic. It has about 400 inhabitants.

Židovice lies approximately 13 kilometres (8 mi) south-east of Litoměřice, 27 km (17 mi) south-east of Ústí nad Labem, and 43 km (27 mi) north of Prague.

== Demographics ==
Historical population
Year	Pop.	±%
1869	255	—
1880	433	+69.8%
1890	417	−3.7%
1900	478	+14.6%
1910	529	+10.7%
1921	487	−7.9%
1930	522	+7.2%
1950	342	−34.5%
1961	395	+15.5%
1970	414	+4.8%
1980	371	−10.4%
1991	287	−22.6%
2001	299	+4.2%
2011	365	+22.1%
2021	402	+10.1%
Source: Censuses
