= Libčeves =

- Municipality
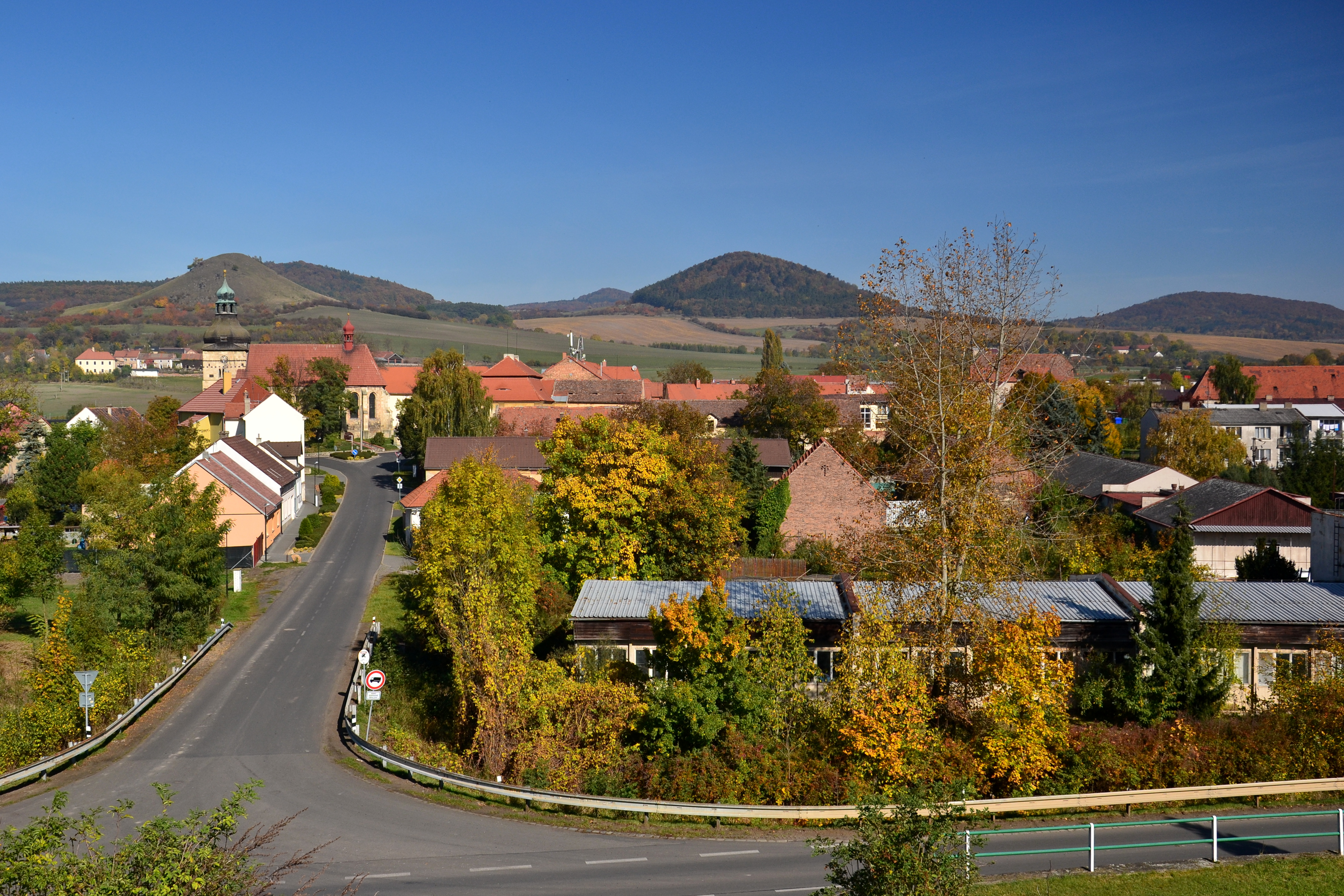
- View from the south

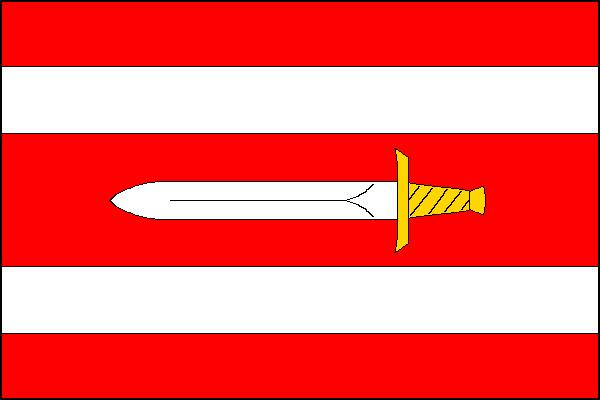
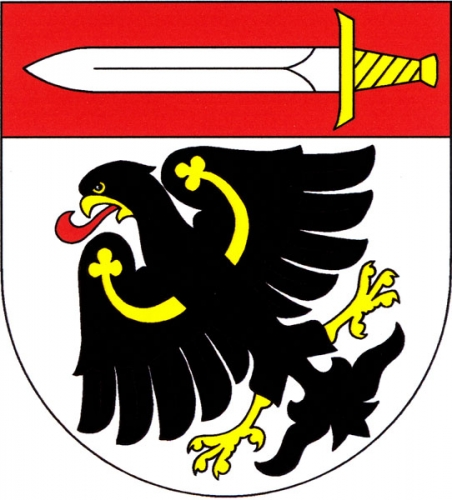
- Flag Coat of arms

- Location in the Czech Republic
- Coordinates: 50°27′9″N 13°50′18″E
- Country: Czech Republic
- Region: Ústí nad Labem
- District: Louny
- First mentioned: 1295

Area
  - Total: 34.72 km^{2} (13.41 sq mi)
- Elevation: 300 m (980 ft)

Population (2026-01-01)
  - Total: 952
  - Density: 27.4/km^{2} (71.0/sq mi)
- Time zone: UTC+1 (CET)
  - Summer (DST): UTC+2 (CEST)
- Postal codes: 439 26, 440 01
- Website: www.libceves.cz

Libčeves (German: Liebshausen) is a municipality and village in Louny District in the Ústí nad Labem Region of the Czech Republic. It has about 1,000 inhabitants.

Libčeves lies approximately 11 kilometres (7 mi) north of Louny, 28 km (17 mi) south-west of Ústí nad Labem and 58 km (36 mi) north-west of Prague.

== Administrative division ==
Libčeves consists of 11 municipal parts (in brackets population according to the 2021 census):

- Libčeves (511)
- Charvatce (55)
- Hnojnice (97)
- Hořenec (41)
- Jablonec (36)
- Lahovice (12)
- Mnichov (17)
- Řisuty (54)
- Sinutec (13)
- Všechlapy (20)
- Židovice (49)

== Demographics ==
Historical population
Year	Pop.	±%
1869	2,120	—
1880	2,360	+11.3%
1890	2,186	−7.4%
1900	2,150	−1.6%
1910	2,032	−5.5%
1921	1,908	−6.1%
1930	2,022	+6.0%
1950	1,255	−37.9%
1961	1,112	−11.4%
1970	1,011	−9.1%
1980	976	−3.5%
1991	912	−6.6%
2001	858	−5.9%
2011	925	+7.8%
2021	905	−2.2%
Source: Censuses

== Notable people ==
- Franz Gregor Ignaz Eckstein (c. 1689 – 1741), Austrian painter
